= List of Wait Wait... Don't Tell Me! episodes (1999) =

The following is a list of episodes of Wait Wait... Don't Tell Me!, NPR's news panel game, that aired during 1999. The episodes, unless otherwise indicated, were hosted by Peter Sagal, with Carl Kasell serving as announcer and scorekeeper. Dates indicated are the episodes' original Saturday air dates. Job titles and backgrounds of the guests reflect their status at the time of their appearance.

== January ==
Date	Guest	Panelists
January 2	Best Of Wait Wait Episode	
January 9	Laura Lorson, All Things Considered swing editor Sara Sarasohn, NPR associate producer Rob Robinson, NPR senior librarian	Roy Blount, Jr., Charlie Pierce, Roxanne Roberts
January 16	Frank Tavares, the voice of NPR's funding credits	Roy Blount, Jr., Roxanne Roberts, Adam Felber
January 23	NPR newscaster Ann Taylor	Charlie Pierce, Roxanne Roberts, Andrea Michaels
January 30	Music producer and Performance Today host Martin Goldsmith	Roy Blount, Jr., Charlie Pierce, Roxanne Roberts

== February ==
Date	Guest	Panelists	Notes
February 6	Edward Lifson, NPR Berlin-based correspondent	Roy Blount, Jr., Adam Felber, Margo Kaufman	
February 13	Morning Edition host Bob Edwards	Adam Felber, Charlie Pierce, Roxanne Roberts	
February 20	Weekend All Things Considered host Daniel Zwerdling	Adam Felber, Roxanne Roberts, Sue Ellicott	
February 27	NPR Senate correspondent Peter Kenyon	Roy Blount, Jr., Adam Felber, Roxanne Roberts	First show with Panelist Predictions

== March ==
Date	Guest	Panelists
March 6	NPR newscaster Korva Coleman	Adam Felber, Charlie Pierce, Roxanne Roberts
March 13	NPR religion correspondent Lynn Neary	Charlie Pierce, Roxanne Roberts, Margo Kaufman
March 20	Jeffrey Dvorkin, NPR's vice-president of news & information	Adam Felber, Charlie Pierce, Roxanne Roberts
March 27	NPR correspondent Joe Palca	Roy Blount, Jr., Adam Felber, Claudia Perry

== April ==
Date	Guest	Panelists
April 3	NPR correspondent John Burnett	Roy Blount, Jr., Adam Felber, Roxanne Roberts
April 10	NPR economics reporter John Ydstie	Roxanne Roberts, Andrea Michaels, Charlie Pierce
April 17	NPR senior news analyst Daniel Schorr	Roy Blount, Jr., Charlie Pierce, Roxanne Roberts
April 24	NPR Congressional correspondent Brian Naylor	Roy Blount, Jr., Adam Felber, Margo Kaufman

== May ==
Date	Guest	Panelists	Notes
May 1	Author and Only a Game host Bill Littlefield	Adam Felber, Charlie Pierce, Roxanne Roberts	
May 8	All Things Considered senior producer Sean Collins	Adam Felber, Roxanne Roberts, Roy Blount, Jr.	Guest hosted by Susan Stamberg, first show to have a guest host
May 15	NPR environment correspondent John Nielsen	Adam Felber, Charlie Pierce, Roxanne Roberts	
May 22	Tom and Ray Magliozzi, hosts of NPR's Car Talk	Roy Blount, Jr., Adam Felber, Roxanne Roberts	
May 29	NPR newscaster Jean Cochran	Roy Blount, Jr., Adam Felber, Sue Ellicott	

== June ==
Date	Guest	Panelists
June 5	This American Life host Ira Glass	Margo Kaufman, Charlie Pierce, Roxanne Roberts
June 12	NPR business correspondent Jack Speer	Roxanne Roberts, Roy Blount, Jr., Adam Felber
June 19	NPR business correspondent Jim Zarroli	Adam Felber, Charlie Pierce, Roxanne Roberts
June 26	NPR Los Angeles bureau engineer Leo Del Aguila	Roy Blount, Jr., Charlie Pierce, Sue Ellicott

== July ==
Date	Guest	Panelists
July 3	NPR All Things Considered host Robert Siegel	Adam Felber, Charlie Pierce, Roxanne Roberts
July 10	NPR Southwest correspondent Wade Goodwyn	Adam Felber, Charlie Pierce, Roxanne Roberts
July 17	NPR Chicago correspondent David Welna	Adam Felber, Charlie Pierce, Sue Ellicott
July 24	NPR newscaster Corey Flintoff	Sue Ellicott, Charlie Pierce, Roxanne Roberts
July 31	NPR correspondent Alex Chadwick	Adam Felber, Roxanne Roberts, Roy Blount, Jr.

== August ==
Date	Guest	Panelists
August 7	Manoli Wetherell, chief engineer of NPR's New York City bureau	Roy Blount, Jr., Adam Felber, Margo Kaufman
August 14	NPR food & culture contributor Vertamae Grosvenor	Roy Blount, Jr., Charlie Pierce, Roxanne Roberts
August 21	WBEZ/Chicago personality Jim Nayder	Charlie Pierce, Roxanne Roberts, Sue Ellicott
August 28	NPR cultural reporter and Anthem host Rick Karr	Roy Blount, Jr., Adam Felber, Roxanne Roberts

== September ==
Date	Guest	Panelists	Notes
September 4	NPR science reporter David Baron	Roy Blount, Jr., Adam Felber, Roxanne Roberts	
September 11	NPR national desk reporter Snigda Prakash	Roy Blount, Jr., Roxanne Roberts, Charlie Pierce	Guest announcer/scorekeeper Jean Cochran
September 18	Bill Radke, Host of NPR and KUOW-FM/Seattle's Rewind	Charlie Pierce, Roxanne Roberts, Sue Ellicott	Guest announcer/scorekeeper Corey Flintoff
September 25	NPR Weekend Edition Saturday host Scott Simon	Adam Felber, Charlie Pierce, Roxanne Roberts	

== October ==
Date	Guest	Panelists
October 2	NPR Detroit correspondent Don Gonyea	Roy Blount, Jr., Adam Felber, Roxanne Roberts
October 9	NPR reporter Adam Hochberg	Adam Felber, Roxanne Roberts, Sue Ellicott
October 16	NPR White House correspondent Mara Liasson	Sue Ellicott, Adam Felber, Charlie Pierce
October 23	NPR Talk of the Nation host Melinda Penkava	Sue Ellicott, Adam Felber, Roxanne Roberts
October 30	Voiceover artist and Word Jazz host Ken Nordine	Roy Blount, Jr., Charlie Pierce, Roxanne Roberts

== November ==
Date	Guest	Panelists	Notes
November 6	NPR correspondent Mike Shuster	Adam Felber, Charlie Pierce, Roxanne Roberts	
November 13	Rachel Basofin, Erica Reid, and Hershal Shevade, staffers at NPR Audience Services	Roxanne Roberts, Roy Blount, Jr., Claudia Perry	
November 20	NPR Los Angeles correspondent Ina Jaffe	Roy Blount, Jr., Adam Felber, Sue Ellicott	
November 27	Writer and broadcaster Studs Terkel	Adam Felber, Roxanne Roberts, Charlie Pierce	Special "Wait Wait Are You Nuts?" edition with "Blunders, Bloopers and Bad Ideas"

== December ==
Date	Guest	Panelists
December 4	NPR senior European correspondent Sylvia Poggioli	Adam Felber, Charlie Pierce, Roxanne Roberts
December 11	NPR political editor Ken Rudin	Roxanne Roberts, Sue Ellicott, Adam Felber
December 18	NPR All Things Considered host Linda Wertheimer	Charlie Pierce, Roy Blount, Jr., Sue Ellicott
December 25	NPR Weekend Edition Sunday host Liane Hansen	Roy Blount, Jr., Charlie Pierce, Roxanne Roberts
