= List of Wait Wait... Don't Tell Me! episodes (2000) =

The following is a list of episodes of Wait Wait... Don't Tell Me!, NPR's news panel game, that aired during 2000. The episodes, unless otherwise indicated, were hosted by Peter Sagal, with Carl Kasell serving as announcer and scorekeeper. Dates indicated are the episodes' original Saturday air dates. Job titles and backgrounds of the guests reflect their status at the time of their appearance.

== January ==
Date	Guest	Panelists	Notes
January 1	Murray Horwitz, NPR's vice-president of cultural programming	Adam Felber, Charlie Pierce, Roxanne Roberts	
January 8	NPR All Things Considered film critic Bob Mondello	Charlie Pierce, Roxanne Roberts, Roy Blount, Jr.	
January 15	NPR Middle East correspondent Jennifer Ludden	Adam Felber, Charlie Pierce, Sue Ellicott	
January 22	NPR correspondent Debbie Elliott	Adam Felber, Charlie Pierce, Roxanne Roberts	
January 29	Howard Berkes, NPR Salt Lake City-based correspondent	Roy Blount, Jr., Charlie Pierce, Roxanne Roberts	Show recorded in Salt Lake City, UT; Wait Wait's first show before a live audience

== February ==
Date	Guest	Panelists
February 5	NPR science reporter David Kestenbaum	Sue Ellicott, Adam Felber, Charlie Pierce
February 12	Wall Street Journal reporter and All Things Considered sports commentator Stefan Fatsis	Charlie Pierce, Claudia Perry, Roxanne Roberts
February 19	Washington Post London bureau chief T.R. Reid	Sue Ellicott, Adam Felber, Roy Blount, Jr.
February 26	NPR National Desk reporter Mary Ann Akers	Roy Blount, Jr., Charlie Pierce, Roxanne Roberts

== March ==
Date	Guest	Panelists
March 4	NPR Talk of the Nation host Juan Williams	Adam Felber, Charlie Pierce, Roxanne Roberts
March 11	NPR Los Angeles reporter Andy Bowers	Charlie Pierce, Roy Blount, Jr., Sue Ellicott
March 18	David Brancaccio, host of PRI's Marketplace	Adam Felber, Roy Blount, Jr., Roxanne Roberts
March 25	Bob Boilen, director of All Things Considered	Roy Blount, Jr., Sue Ellicott, Adam Felber

== April ==
Date	Guest	Panelists
April 1	Madeleine Brand, NPR's acting London correspondent	Roy Blount, Jr., Sue Ellicott, Adam Felber
April 8	Chicago Sun Times sports columnist and Weekend Edition Saturday commentator Ron Rappaport	Adam Felber, Charlie Pierce, Roxanne Roberts
April 15	NPR reference librarians Kee Malesky and Alphonse Vinh	Roy Blount, Jr., Charlie Pierce, Roxanne Roberts
April 22	NPR Pentagon correspondent Steve Inskeep	Roy Blount, Jr., Sue Ellicott, Adam Felber
April 29	Mystery writer Sara Paretsky	Roy Blount, Jr., Charlie Pierce, Roxanne Roberts

== May ==
Date	Guest	Panelists	Notes
May 6	NPR Morning Edition anchor Bob Edwards	Roy Blount, Jr., Sue Ellicott, Adam Felber	
May 13	NPR New York correspondent Melissa Block	Adam Felber, Charlie Pierce, Roxanne Roberts	Guest host Robert Siegel
May 20	This American Life host Ira Glass	Adam Felber, Roxanne Roberts, Ken Rudin	
May 27	NPR legal correspondent Nina Totenberg	Sue Ellicott, Adam Felber, Charlie Pierce	

== June ==
Date	Guest	Panelists	Notes
June 3	Ira Flatow, host of Talk of the Nation's Science Friday	Roy Blount, Jr., Charlie Pierce, Roxanne Roberts	Guest announcer/scorekeeper Jean Cochran
June 10	NPR London correspondent Julie McCarthy	Sue Ellicott, Adam Felber, Ken Rudin	
June 17	NPR host Lisa Simeone	Roy Blount, Jr., Sue Ellicott, Charlie Pierce	
June 24	NPR host Diane Rehm	Roy Blount, Jr., Adam Felber, Roxanne Roberts	

== July ==
Date	Guest	Panelists	Notes
July 1	NPR technology correspondent John McChesney	Adam Felber, Charlie Pierce, Roxanne Roberts	
July 8	NPR Weekend Edition Sunday host Liane Hansen	Adam Felber, Charlie Pierce, Patt Morrison	
July 15	NPR All Things Considered host Linda Wertheimer	Adam Felber, Roy Blount, Jr., Sue Ellicott	
July 22	NPR Weekend Edition Saturday host Scott Simon	Sue Ellicott, Charlie Pierce, Roxanne Roberts	
July 29	Rick Karr, New York-based cultural reporter for NPR	Roy Blount, Jr., Charlie Pierce, Roxanne Roberts	Guest announcer/scorekeeper Corey Flintoff

== August ==
Date	Guest	Panelists	Notes
August 5	NPR correspondent/host Guy Raz	Roy Blount, Jr., Adam Felber, Roxanne Roberts	
August 12	NPR sports correspondent Tom Goldman	Adam Felber, Sue Ellicott, Charlie Pierce	Guest host Susan Stamberg
August 19	NPR environmental correspondent John Nielsen	Roy Blount, Jr, Charlie Pierce, Roxanne Roberts	Guest host Adam Felber
August 26	Maria Hinojosa, CNN Correspondent and host of NPR's Latino USA	Roy Blount, Jr, Charlie Pierce, Roxanne Roberts	

== September ==
Date	Guest	Panelists
September 2	Actress Martha Plimpton	Sue Ellicott, Adam Felber, Patt Morrison
September 9	Voice actress Nancy Cartwright	Adam Felber, Charlie Pierce, Roxanne Roberts
September 16	NPR health care correspondent Jon Hamilton	Adam Felber, Patt Morrison, Charlie Pierce
September 23	U.S. Senator John McCain of Arizona	Charlie Pierce, Roxanne Roberts, Roy Blount, Jr.
September 30	Brooke Gladstone, host of NPR's On The Media	Roy Blount, Jr., Sue Ellicott, Charlie Pierce

== October ==
Date	Guest	Panelists	Notes
October 7	NPR economics correspondent John Ydstie	Adam Felber, Charlie Pierce, Roxanne Roberts	Guest announcer/scorekeeper Jean Cochran
October 14	Rear Admiral Lewis Crenshaw of the United States Navy's 6th Carrier Group	Adam Felber, Roxanne Roberts, Roy Blount, Jr.	Guest announcer/scorekeeper Corey Flintoff
October 21	WBEZ/Chicago personality Jim Nayder	Adam Felber, Roxanne Roberts, Sue Ellicott	
October 28	NPR New York correspondent Margo Adler	Roy Blount, Jr., Charlie Pierce, Roxanne Roberts	

== November ==
Date	Guest	Panelists
November 4	White House economic advisor Gene Sperling	Adam Felber, Patt Morrison, Roxanne Roberts
November 11	Writer Armistead Maupin	Roy Blount, Jr., Sue Ellicott, Charlie Pierce
November 18	Editorial cartoonist Kevin "KAL" Kallaugher	Roy Blount, Jr., Adam Felber, Roxanne Roberts
November 25	Encore of 1/1/2000 episode featuring NPR VP/cultural programming Murray Horwitz	

== December ==
Date	Guest	Panelists
December 2	Radio host Michael Feldman	Adam Felber, Charlie Pierce, Roxanne Roberts
December 9	Food & travel writers Jane and Michael Stern	Adam Felber, Charlie Pierce, Sue Ellicott
December 16	Sports author and Morning Edition commentator John Feinstein	Sue Ellicott, Adam Felber, Roy Blount, Jr.
December 23	Washington Post London bureau chief T.R. Reid	Charlie Pierce, Roxanne Roberts, Patt Morrison
December 30	NPR All Things Considered host Robert Siegel	Roy Blount, Jr., Adam Felber, Roxanne Roberts
