= List of Wait Wait... Don't Tell Me! episodes (2009) =

The following is a list of episodes of Wait Wait... Don't Tell Me!, NPR's news quiz program, that aired during 2009. All episodes, unless otherwise indicated, were hosted by Peter Sagal and announcer/scorekeeper Carl Kassell, and originated at Chicago's Chase Theater. Dates indicated are the episodes' original Saturday air dates. Job titles of the guests reflect their job position or status at the time of their appearance.

== January ==
Date	Guest	Panelists	Notes
January 3	"Best of 'Not My Job,'" featuring actor/director Leonard Nimoy, former U.S. Senator George McGovern, former baseball star Moose Skowron, author/radio personality Garrison Keillor, and the Blind Boys of Alabama's Jimmy Carter		
January 10	CNN news anchor Campbell Brown	Adam Felber, Roxanne Roberts, Mo Rocca	
January 17	Composer Burt Bacharach	Amy Dickinson, Charlie Pierce, Paula Poundstone	
January 24	Glamour editor in chief Cynthia Leive	Tom Bodett, Kyrie O'Connor, P. J. O'Rourke	
January 31	Actress and author Carrie Fisher	Roy Blount, Jr., Paul Provenza, Alison Stewart	

== February ==
Date	Guest	Panelists	Notes
February 7	High wire artist Philippe Petit	Adam Felber, Kyrie O'Connor, Charlie Pierce	
February 14	Comedy-themed "Best of 'Not My Job,'" featuring John Hodgman, Amy Sedaris, Drew Carey, Julia Sweeney, and Denis Leary		
February 21	Opera diva Frederica von Stade	Tom Bodett, Paula Poundstone, Mo Rocca	Show recorded at Zellerbach Hall in Berkeley, CA
February 28	Actor Bruce Campbell	Roy Blount, Jr., Paul Provenza, Roxanne Roberts	

== March ==
Date	Guest	Panelists	Notes
March 7	Pro wrestler and actor John Cena	Tom Bodett, Roxanne Roberts, Mo Rocca	
March 14	NBC News White House correspondent Chuck Todd	Kyrie O'Connor, P. J. O'Rourke, Paula Poundstone	
March 21	New York Times business correspondent Joe Nocera	Tom Bodett, Kyrie O'Connor, Paul Provenza	
March 28	Singer/songwriter Kim Deal	Roy Blount, Jr., Amy Dickinson, Charlie Pierce	Show recorded at Victoria Theatre in Dayton, OH

== April ==
Date	Guest	Panelists	Notes
April 4	Journalist and food writer Michael Pollan	Tom Bodett, Paula Poundstone, Mo Rocca	Show recorded at Zellerbach Hall in Berkeley, CA; Episode theme: Technology
April 11	Actor William H. Macy	Paula Poundstone, Mo Rocca, Adam Felber	
April 18	TV personality and restaurateur Paula Deen	Tom Bodett, Adam Felber, Roxanne Roberts	
April 25	Former tennis player Monica Seles	Tom Bodett, Roy Blount, Jr., Kyrie O'Connor	

== May ==
Date	Guest	Panelists	Notes
May 2	Actor Liev Schreiber	Amy Dickinson, Charlie Pierce, Paul Provenza	
May 9	Supreme Court reporter Dahlia Lithwick	Amy Dickinson, Paul Provenza, Paula Poundstone	
May 16	White House senior advisor David Axelrod	Paula Poundstone, Roxanne Roberts, Mo Rocca	Show recorded at Lisner Auditorium in Washington, D.C.
May 23	Diva-themed "Best of 'Not My Job,'" featuring Paula Deen, Mavis Staples, Carrie Fisher, and Frederica von Stade		
May 30	Singer/songwriter Robert Earl Keen	Roy Blount, Jr., Kyrie O'Connor, Charlie Pierce	Show recorded at Bass Concert Hall in Austin, TX

== June ==
Date	Guest	Panelists	Notes
June 6	Actor and comedian Ed Helms	Tom Bodett, Paula Poundstone, Julia Sweeney	
June 13	Chicago blues musician Lil' Ed Williams	Amy Dickinson, Charlie Pierce, Paul Provenza	Show recorded at the Jay Pritzker Pavilion in Chicago's Millennium Park
June 20	Author and activist Elizabeth Edwards	Roy Blount, Jr., Kyrie O'Connor, Mo Rocca	Show recorded at Memorial Hall in Chapel Hill, NC
June 27	New York Times columnist Frank Rich	Tom Bodett, Adam Felber, Roxanne Roberts	

== July ==
Date	Guest	Panelists	Notes
July 4	Encore of museum-themed 11/26/2005 episode featuring author Clyde Edgerton		
July 11	Singer/songwriter Neko Case	Adam Felber, Paula Poundstone, Julia Sweeney	
July 18	Comedian/actor and talk show host Jimmy Fallon	Roy Blount, Jr., Charlie Pierce, Roxanne Roberts	
July 25	Former Major League Baseball player Doug Glanville	Tom Bodett, Kyrie O'Connor, Mo Rocca	

== August ==
Date	Guest	Panelists	Notes
August 1	Game show producer Chuck Barris	Amy Dickinson, P. J. O'Rourke, Charlie Pierce	
August 8	Filmmaker Judd Apatow	Tom Bodett, Paula Poundstone, Roxanne Roberts	
August 15	U.S. Representative Aaron Schock of Illinois	Amy Dickinson, Charlie Pierce, Roy Blount, Jr.	
August 22	Animal-themed "Best of" episode, featuring veterinarian Kevin Fitzgerald and animal expert Bob Freer		
August 29	Listener-selected "Best of" episode, featuring writer Michael Pollan and comedian/talk show host Craig Ferguson		

== September ==
Date	Guest	Panelists	Notes
September 5	Rapper Joseph "Rev Run" Simmons of Run-D.M.C.	Adam Felber, Roxanne Roberts, Mo Rocca	Guest announcer/scorekeeper Korva Coleman
September 12	U.S. Representative Henry Waxman of California	Kyrie O'Connor, P. J. O'Rourke, Charlie Pierce	Guest announcer/scorekeeper Korva Coleman
September 19	Surfer Kelly Slater	Mo Rocca, Roy Blount, Jr., Amy Dickinson	Guest announcer/scorekeeper Corey Flintoff
September 26	Meteorologist and storm chaser Reed Timmer	Tom Bodett, Paula Poundstone, Paul Provenza	

== October ==
Date	Guest	Panelists	Notes
October 3	U.S. Senator Claire McCaskill of Missouri	Kyrie O'Connor, P. J. O'Rourke, Charlie Pierce	
October 10	Actress Ashley Judd	Charlie Pierce, Tom Bodett, Roxanne Roberts	
October 17	Comedian/actress Susie Essman	Roy Blount, Jr., Mo Rocca, Faith Salie	
October 24	NBC News anchor Brian Williams	Mo Rocca, Adam Felber, Paula Poundstone	
October 31	Horror film director George A. Romero	Luke Burbank, Amy Dickinson, Julia Sweeney	

== November ==
Date	Guest	Panelists	Notes
November 7	Professional skateboarder Tony Hawk	Adam Felber, Roxanne Roberts, Mo Rocca	
November 14	Singer/songwriter Rufus Wainwright	Tom Bodett, Kyrie O'Connor, Paul Provenza	
November 21	Actor Jason Schwartzman	Roy Blount, Jr., Paula Poundstone, Faith Salie	
November 28	"Manly Men"-themed "Best of 'Not My Job,'" featuring Philippe Petit, John Cena, Jimmy Fallon, Bruce Campbell, and Robert Earl Keen		

== December ==
Date	Guest	Panelists	Notes
December 5	Animated film director and Pixar executive Pete Docter	Adam Felber, P. J. O'Rourke, Julia Sweeney	
December 12	CNN news anchor Rick Sanchez	Roy Blount, Jr., Amy Dickinson, Charlie Pierce	Show recorded at Cobb Energy Performing Arts Centre in Cumberland, GA
December 19	Singer Andy Williams	Tom Bodett, Paula Poundstone, Roxanne Roberts	
December 26	Actor and activist George Takei	Adam Felber, Roxanne Roberts, Mo Rocca	Episode theme: Family
