= List of Wait Wait... Don't Tell Me! episodes (2006) =

The following is a list of episodes of Wait Wait... Don't Tell Me!, NPR's news panel game, that aired during 2005. All episodes, unless otherwise noted, feature Peter Sagal as host and Carl Kasell as announcer/scorekeeper, and originate from the Chase Bank Auditorium in Chicago. Dates indicated are the episodes' original Saturday air dates. Job titles and backgrounds of the guests reflect their status at the time of their appearance.

== January ==
| Date | Guest | Panelists | Notes |
|---|---|---|---|
| January 7 | "Best of" episode featuring Iraq-stationed U.S. Army major Robert Bateman | | |
| January 14 | Poet and commentator Andrei Codrescu | Sue Ellicott, P. J. O'Rourke, Paula Poundstone | |
| January 21 | Magician Penn Jillette | Roy Blount, Jr., Kyrie O'Connor, Charlie Pierce | |
| January 28 | Actor Tim Meadows | Adam Felber, Roxanne Roberts, Mo Rocca | First Wait Wait episode to be made available as a podcast |

== February ==
| Date | Guest | Panelists | Notes |
|---|---|---|---|
| February 4 | Former U.S. Senator Gary Hart | Tom Bodett, Sue Ellicott, Charlie Pierce | Guest announcer/scorekeeper Korva Coleman |
| February 11 | Talk show host Sally Jesse Raphael | Adam Felber, Kyrie O'Connor, Roxanne Roberts | Guest announcer/scorekeeper Korva Coleman |
| February 18 | Blues harmonica player Corky Siegel | Charlie Pierce, Roy Blount, Jr., Amy Dickinson | |
| February 25 | Author and former Jeopardy! champion Ken Jennings | Adam Felber, Paula Poundstone, Mo Rocca | Show recorded at Kingsbury Hall on the campus of University of Utah in Salt Lake City |

== March ==
| Date | Guest | Panelists |
|---|---|---|
| March 4 | Columnist Peggy Noonan | Adam Felber, Charlie Pierce, Roxanne Roberts |
| March 11 | NPR Weekend Edition Saturday host Scott Simon | Adam Felber, Roy Blount, Jr., Kyrie O'Connor |
| March 18 | Actor Elliott Gould | Adam Felber, Sue Ellicott, Paula Poundstone |
| March 25 | Humorist Fran Lebowitz | Roy Blount, Jr., Amy Dickinson, Mo Rocca |

== April ==
| Date | Guest | Panelists | Notes |
|---|---|---|---|
| April 1 | Author Rusty DeWees | P. J. O'Rourke, Charlie Pierce, Roxanne Roberts | Sow recorded at Lebanon Opera House in Lebanon, NH |
| April 8 | Actor/comedian Sarah Silverman | Amy Dickinson, Adam Felber, Mo Rocca | |
| April 15 | Author Anne Lamott | Adam Felber, Tom Bodett, Kyrie O'Connor | Show recorded at Van Duzer Theatre in Arcata, CA |
| April 22 | Singer and spoken-word artist Henry Rollins | Roy Blount, Jr., Aamer Haleem, Paula Poundstone | |
| April 29 | Actor/comedian Billy Connolly | Adam Felber, Charlie Pierce, Sue Ellicott | |

== May ==
| Date | Guest | Panelists | Notes |
|---|---|---|---|
| May 6 | Washington, DC mayor Anthony Williams | Tom Bodett, Charlie Pierce, Roxanne Roberts | Show recorded at Lisner Auditorium in Washington, DC |
| May 13 | Actor Tom Hanks | Roy Blount, Jr., Adam Felber, Paula Poundstone | |
| May 20 | Comedian Elayne Boosler | Roy Blount, Jr., Kyrie O'Connor, Mo Rocca | |
| May 27 | Soccer analyst and radio host Steven Cohen | Adam Felber, Roxanne Roberts, P. J. O'Rourke | |

== June ==
| Date | Guest | Panelists | Notes |
|---|---|---|---|
| June 3 | Comedian and late night TV host Craig Ferguson | Tom Bodett, Sue Ellicott, Charlie Pierce | |
| June 10 | Comedian Paul Provenza | Adam Felber, Paula Poundstone, Roxanne Roberts | Guest announcer/scorekeeper Corey Flintoff |
| June 17 | Humorist Calvin Trillin | Roy Blount, Jr., Amy Dickinson, Mo Rocca | Show recorded at Folly Theater in Kansas City, MO; Guest announcer/scorekeeper Corey Flintoff |
| June 24 | NBC Nightly News anchor Brian Williams | Sue Ellicott, Charlie Pierce, Aamer Haleem | Guest announcer/scorekeeper Korva Coleman |

== July ==
| Date | Guest | Panelists | Notes |
|---|---|---|---|
| July 1 | PBS journalist Gwen Ifill | Luke Burbank, Paula Poundstone, Mo Rocca | |
| July 8 | "Best of" episode featuring Iraq-stationed U.S. Army major Robert Bateman | | |
| July 15 | Comedian/actress Janeane Garofalo | Paula Poundstone, Roy Blount, Jr., Richard Roeper | |
| July 22 | Humpy Wheeler, former NASCAR driver and president/GM of Lowe's Motor Speedway | Paula Poundstone, Mo Rocca, Kyrie O'Connor | Show recorded at Belk Theatre in Charlotte, NC |
| July 29 | Actor Romany Malco | Luke Burbank, Charlie Pierce, Roxanne Roberts | |

== August ==
| Date | Guest | Panelists | Notes |
|---|---|---|---|
| August 5 | "Best of" episode featuring US Senator Barack Obama, actor Tom Hanks, NPR personality Terry Gross, and game show champ Ken Jennings | | |
| August 12 | Comedian/actor Tommy Chong | Sue Ellicott, Aamer Haleem, Charlie Pierce | Guest host Luke Burbank |
| August 19 | CNN anchor Soledad O'Brien | Roy Blount, Jr., Tom Bodett, Paula Poundstone | Guest host Luke Burbank |
| August 26 | Comedian Rita Rudner | Charlie Pierce, Amy Dickinson, Adam Felber | Guest host Luke Burbank |

== September ==
| Date | Guest | Panelists | Notes |
|---|---|---|---|
| September 2 | "Best of" episode featuring Washington, DC mayor Anthony Williams | | |
| September 9 | Actor Alan Alda | Roy Blount, Jr., Amy Dickinson Paula Poundstone | |
| September 16 | Fashion designer Isaac Mizrahi | Tom Bodett, Kyrie O'Connor, Mo Rocca | Show recorded at John Lyman Center in New Haven, CT |
| September 23 | The View co-host Joy Behar | Paula Poundstone, Paul Provenza, Roxanne Roberts | |
| September 30 | Sesame Street puppeteer Kevin Clash and Elmo | Tom Bodett, Sue Ellicott, Charlie Pierce | |

== October ==
| Date | Guest | Panelists |
|---|---|---|
| October 7 | Author and former Jeopardy! champion Ken Jennings | Tom Bodett, Kyrie O'Connor, Roxanne Roberts |
| October 14 | "Best of 'Not My Job'" featuring news anchor Brian Williams, actors Janeane Garofalo and Alan Alda, writer Anne Lamott, and magician Penn Jillette | |
| October 21 | Humorist Dave Barry | Roy Blount, Jr., Sue Ellicott, Mo Rocca |
| October 28 | TV host Tom Bergeron | Tom Bodett, Amy Dickinson, Angela Nissel |

== November ==
| Date | Guest | Panelists | Notes |
|---|---|---|---|
| November 4 | Wikipedia co-founder Jimmy Wales | P. J. O'Rourke, Paula Poundstone, Roxanne Roberts | Show recorded at Van Wezel Performing Arts Hall in Sarasota, FL |
| November 11 | Satirist Andy Borowitz | Tom Bodett, Aamer Haleem, Kyrie O'Connor | |
| November 18 | Actor and novelist Harry Shearer | Paula Poundstone, Roy Blount, Jr., Paul Provenza | |
| November 25 | "Best of" episode | | |

== December ==
| Date | Guest | Panelists |
|---|---|---|
| December 2 | Comedic actress & writer Amy Sedaris | Amy Dickinson, Charlie Pierce, Mo Rocca |
| December 9 | Actress/writer Tina Fey | Tom Bodett, Angela Nissel, Paula Poundstone |
| December 16 | Astronaut Pam Melroy | Mo Rocca, Adam Felber, Kyrie O'Connor |
| December 23 | Jazz musician Branford Marsalis | Charlie Pierce, Roy Blount, Jr., Roxanne Roberts |
| December 30 | "Best of" episode featuring Washington, DC mayor Anthony Williams | |
