= List of Wait Wait... Don't Tell Me! episodes (2012) =

The following is a list of episodes of Wait Wait... Don't Tell Me!, NPR's news panel game, during 2012. Job titles and lines of work reflect the position of individuals at the time of the appearance. All shows, unless otherwise indicated, are hosted by Peter Sagal with announcer/scorekeeper Carl Kassel, and originated at Chicago's Chase Auditorium.

== January ==
Date	Guest	Panelists	Notes
January 7	Director Paul Feig	Roy Blount, Jr., Amy Dickinson, Adam Felber	
January 14	Comedian David Cross	Kyrie O'Connor, Brian Babylon, Paula Poundstone	
January 21	Singer Duke Fakir Of The Four Tops	Mo Rocca, Tom Bodett, Faith Salie	Show recorded in Detroit, MI
January 28	Children's author Jack Gantos	Peter Grosz, Roxanne Roberts, Brian Babylon	

== February ==
Date	Guest	Panelists	Notes
February 4	Actor Gary Oldman	Faith Salie, Charlie Pierce, P. J. O'Rourke	
February 11	Jazz singer Kurt Elling	Roxanne Roberts, Tom Bodett, Paula Poundstone	
February 18	Speedskater Nick Pearson	Peter Grosz, Kyrie O'Connor, Mo Rocca	Show recorded in Salt Lake City, UT
February 25	Actor-themed "Best of" episode, featuring Kevin Bacon, Lisa Kudrow, Pee-wee Herman, Lucy Lawless and John Leguizamo		

== March ==
Date	Guest	Panelists	Notes
March 3	Actor Alec Baldwin	Alonzo Bodden, Luke Burbank, Roxanne Roberts	
March 10	Chef Rick Bayless	Brian Babylon, Tom Bodett, Amy Dickinson	
March 17	Musician Joey Burns of Calexico	Charlie Pierce, Faith Salie, Roy Blount, Jr.	Show recorded in Tucson, AZ
March 24	Actress Ana Gasteyer	Mo Rocca, Jessi Klein, Tom Bodett	
March 31	Writer and musician Carrie Brownstein	Maz Jobrani, Brian Babylon, Paula Poundstone	

== April ==
Date	Guest	Panelists	Notes
April 7	Comedian Rachel Dratch	Roxanne Roberts, Adam Felber, Roy Blount, Jr.	
April 14	Author and former baseball pitcher Jim Bouton	Alonzo Bodden, Jessi Klein, Mo Rocca	Show recorded in Boston, MA
April 21	Writer-themed "Best of" episode, featuring Jack Gantos, Tom Robbins, Susan Orlean, Mary Roach, and Carl Hiaasen		
April 28	Director Barry Sonnenfeld	Paula Poundstone, Tom Bodett, Amy Dickinson	

== May ==
Date	Guest	Panelists	Notes
May 5	Former talk show host Dick Cavett	Charlie Pierce, Kyrie O'Connor, Roy Blount, Jr.	Show recorded in Lincoln, NE
May 12	Comedian Bobcat Goldthwait	Amy Dickinson, Mo Rocca, Tom Bodett	
May 19	Kyle Gass and Jack Black Of Tenacious D	Brian Babylon, Roxanne Roberts, Charlie Pierce	
May 26	Folk singer Bonnie 'Prince' Billy	P. J. O'Rourke, Luke Burbank, Paula Poundstone	

== June ==
Date	Guest	Panelists	Notes
June 2	"Best of" episode featuring actor Gary Oldman, actor Simon Pegg and baseball legend Cal Ripken		
June 9	White House chef Sam Kass	Roxanne Roberts, Mo Rocca, P. J. O'Rourke	Show recorded in North Bethesda, MD
June 16	Novelist John Irving	Maz Jobrani, Amy Dickinson, Roy Blount, Jr.	
June 23	Director Rob Reiner	Brian Babylon, Paula Poundstone, Luke Burbank	Guest host Peter Grosz
June 30	Comedian Drew Carey	Alonzo Bodden, Kyrie O'Connor, Mo Rocca	Show recorded in Cleveland, OH

== July ==
Date	Guest	Panelists	Notes
July 7	"Best of" episode, featuring rapper/actor Ice-T, actor Tony Shalhoub, and former US President Bill Clinton		
July 14	Actress Brooke Shields	Peter Grosz, Roxanne Roberts, Bobcat Goldthwait	
July 21	Author Norton Juster	Jessi Klein, Paula Poundstone, Brian Babylon	
July 28	Economist Paul Krugman	Mo Rocca, Kyrie O'Connor, Simon Amstell	

== August ==
Date	Guest	Panelists	Notes
August 4	Actors Dax Shepard and Kristen Bell	Paula Pell, Charlie Pierce, Adam Felber	
August 11	NASA engineers Bobak Ferdowsi and Adam Steltzner	Tom Bodett, Amy Dickinson, Roy Blount, Jr.	Show recorded in Portland, ME
August 18	Comedian Mike Birbiglia	Luke Burbank, Faith Salie, Paula Poundstone	Guest announcer/scorekeeper Bill Kurtis
August 25	British ambassador to the US Peter Westmacott	Charlie Pierce, Jessi Klein, Tom Bodett	Political-themed episode Show recorded in North Bethesda, MD

== September ==
Date	Guest	Panelists	Notes
September 1	"Best of" episode, featuring former Major League Baseball pitcher Jim Bouton, director Barry Sonnenfeld, and rock band Tenacious D		
September 8	Singer and songwriter Bonnie Raitt	Jessi Klein, Tom Bodett, Paula Poundstone	Guest announcer/scorekeeper Bill Kurtis
September 15	Author George R.R. Martin	Charlie Pierce, Roxanne Roberts, P. J. O'Rourke	Guest announcer/scorekeeper Bill Kurtis
September 22	Centers for Disease Control and Prevention director Thomas Frieden	Mo Rocca, Faith Salie, Roy Blount, Jr.	Show recorded in Atlanta, GA
September 29	Minnesota Vikings punter Chris Kluwe	Brian Babylon, Kyrie O'Connor, Adam Felber	Guest host Peter Grosz

== October ==
Date	Guest	Panelists	Notes
October 6	Musician Ben Folds	Amy Dickinson, Maz Jobrani, Paula Poundstone	
October 13	"Best Of" episode, featuring actor Tom Hanks, puppeteer Kevin Clash, actress Carrie Fisher, singer Linda Ronstadt, and voiceover artist Don LaFontaine		
October 20	Congresswoman and House Minority Leader Nancy Pelosi of California	Faith Salie, Luke Burbank, Charlie Pierce	
October 27	United States women's national soccer team member Abby Wambach	Brian Babylon, Kyrie O'Connor, Tom Bodett	Guest host Drew Carey

== November ==
Date	Guest	Panelists	Notes
November 3	Smithsonian Institution secretary Dr. Wayne Clough	Paula Poundstone, Luke Burbank, Firoozeh Dumas	
November 10	TV host and author Martha Stewart	Alonzo Bodden, Roxanne Roberts, P. J. O'Rourke	
November 17	Beer maker and Sprecher Brewery owner Randy Sprecher	Faith Salie, Charlie Pierce, Mo Rocca	Show recorded in Milwaukee, WI
November 24	Science-themed "best of," featuring NASA engineers Bobak Ferdowsi & Adam Steltzner, astrophysicist Neil DeGrasse Tyson, astrophysicist Adam Riess, and economist Paul Krugman		

== December ==
Date	Guest	Panelists	Notes
December 1	ABC News journalist Jake Tapper	Brian Babylon, Amy Dickinson, Adam Felber	
December 8	Actor Hugh Bonneville	Adam Felber, Paula Poundstone, Maz Jobrani	Show recorded in Los Angeles, CA
December 15	National Institutes of Health director Francis Collins	Luke Burbank, Jessi Klein, Tom Bodett	
December 22	Actor and comedian Fred Armisen	Brian Babylon, Roxanne Roberts, Bobcat Goldthwait	
December 29	Reprisal of political-themed 8/25/2012 episode featuring British ambassador to the US Peter Westmacott		
