= List of Wait Wait... Don't Tell Me! episodes (2014) =

The following is a list of episodes of Wait Wait... Don't Tell Me!, NPR's news panel game, during 2014. Job titles of guests reflect the individuals' position at the time of their appearance. All shows, unless otherwise indicated, are taped at Chicago's Chase Auditorium, with Peter Sagal serving as host and Carl Kasell (thru May 17) and Bill Kurtis serving as announcer/scorekeeper.

== January ==
Date	Guest	Panelists	Notes
January 4	Comedian-themed "Best of" episode, featuring Jeff Garlin, John Hodgman, Amy Sedaris, Tig Notaro and Jim Gaffigan		
January 11	Political Consultant Mary Matalin	Adam Felber, Paula Poundstone, Charlie Pierce	
January 18	Historian Doris Kearns Goodwin	P. J. O'Rourke, Amy Dickinson, Luke Burbank	
January 25	Television personality and former hedge fund manager Jim Cramer	Brian Babylon, Jessi Klein, Hannibal Buress	

== February ==
Date	Guest	Panelists	Notes
February 1	Paleontologist Paul Sereno	Mo Rocca, Tom Bodett, Faith Salie	Show recorded at University of Chicago's Mandel Hall
February 8	Music historian Peter Guralnick	Roxanne Roberts, Tom Bodett, Paula Poundstone	
February 15	US Senator Jeff Flake of Arizona	Brian Babylon, Kyrie O'Connor, Maz Jobrani	Show recorded in Phoenix, Arizona
February 22	US Senator Mark Warner of Virginia	Alonzo Bodden, Faith Salie, Roy Blount, Jr.	

== March ==
Date	Guest	Panelists	Notes
March 1	"Best of" episode featuring former New York Yankees pitcher Jim Bouton, director Barry Sonnenfeld, rock band Tenacious D		
March 8	Drummer Stewart Copeland	Adam Felber, Faith Salie, Mike Birbiglia	
March 15	Wingsuit flyer Joby Ogwyn	Paula Poundstone, Charlie Pierce, Cindy Chupack	
March 22	Actor and former NFL player Terry Crews	Brian Babylon, Amy Dickinson, Bobcat Goldthwaite	Show recorded in Kalamazoo, Michigan
March 29	Violinist Itzhak Perlman	Roy Blount, Jr., Kyrie O'Connor, Tom Bodett	Guest host Mike Pesca

== April ==
Date	Guest	Panelists	Notes
April 5	Comedian Amy Schumer	Paula Poundstone, Roxanne Roberts, P. J. O'Rourke	
April 12	Filmmaker Errol Morris	Luke Burbank, Amy Dickinson, Charlie Pierce	
April 19	"Best of" episode featuring pianist Emanuel Ax, historian Doris Kearns Goodwin and Arizona Senator Jeff Flake		
April 26	Ballerina Misty Copeland	Brian Babylon, Kyrie O'Connor, Roy Blount, Jr.	

== May ==
Date	Guest	Panelists	Notes
May 3	San Diego Zoo animal ambassador Rick Schwartz	Adam Felber, Paula Poundstone, Alonzo Bodden	Show recorded in San Diego, California
May 10	Actor Rob Lowe	Brian Babylon, Jessi Klein, Tom Bodett	
May 17	Political adviser John Podesta	Mo Rocca, Paula Poundstone, Roxanne Roberts	Show recorded in Washington, D.C. Carl Kassel's last show before becoming Wait Wait's "scorekeeper emeritus"
May 24	Singer Toni Braxton	Charlie Pierce, Kyrie O'Connor, Roy Blount, Jr.	Bill Kurtis' first show as Wait Wait's regular announcer/scorekeeper
May 31	Actor Alicia Silverstone	Amy Dickinson, Adam Felber, Rosie Perez	

== June ==
Date	Guest	Panelists	Notes
June 7	Fashion consultant Tim Gunn	Mo Rocca, Peter Grosz, Jessi Klein	Show recorded in New York, NY
June 14	Author Mary Higgins Clark	Tom Bodett, Brian Babylon, Ophira Eisenberg	
June 21	University of Wisconsin—Madison professor and Up Series participant Nick Hitchon	P. J. O'Rourke, Kyrie O'Connor, Maz Jobrani	Show recorded in Madison, Wisconsin
June 28	Actress Scarlett Johansson	Roxanne Roberts, Luke Burbank, Shelby Fero	

== July ==
Date	Guest	Panelists	Notes
July 5	"Best of" episode featuring actors Terry Crews & Tony Shalhoub and poet Billy Collins		
July 12	Skier Mikaela Shiffrin	Brian Babylon, Paula Poundstone, Tom Bodett	Show recorded at Red Rocks Amphitheatre in Morrison, Colorado
July 19	Chef Thomas Keller	Roxanne Roberts, Roy Blount, Jr., Bobcat Goldthwait	Shows recorded in San Francisco, California
July 26	Actor, emcee, filmmaker, and drag performer Peaches Christ	Luke Burbank, Amy Dickinson, Brian Babylon	Shows recorded in San Francisco, California

== August ==
Date	Guest	Panelists	Notes
August 2	Author Amy Tan	Alonzo Bodden, Paula Poundstone, Maz Jobrani	Show recorded in San Francisco, California
August 9	"Best of" episode featuring former New York Yankees pitcher Jim Bouton, Randy Sprecher of Sprecher Brewery, author Gillian Flynn, filmmaker John Waters, and singer Rosanne Cash		
August 16	"Best of" episode featuring pickpocket Apollo Robbins, singer Mavis Staples, singer Alice Cooper, Google chairman Eric Schmidt, and fashion guru Tim Gunn		
August 23	Animal-themed "Best of" episode featuring veterinarian Kevin Fitzgerald and San Diego Zoo animal ambassador Rick Schwartz		
August 30	Governor Deval Patrick of Massachusetts	Adam Felber, Paula Poundstone, Roy Blount, Jr.	Show recorded at Tanglewood in Lenox, Massachusetts; Special "Listener Limerick Challenge" appearance by Carl Kassel

== September ==
Date	Guest	Panelists	Notes
September 6	Singer songwriter Loudon Wainwright III	Adam Felber, Faith Salie, Mike Birbiglia	
September 13	Comedian Richard Lewis	Brian Babylon, Roxanne Roberts, Moshe Kasher	
September 20	Travel Guru Rick Steves	Maz Jobrani, Paula Poundstone, Luke Burbank	Show recorded in Seattle, Washington
September 27	Author Elizabeth Gilbert	Shelby Fero, Tom Bodett, Kyrie O'Connor	

== October ==
Date	Guest	Panelists	Notes
October 4	United States Secretary of Energy Ernest Moniz	Faith Salie, Charlie Pierce, Paula Poundstone	
October 11	"Best of" episode featuring novelist Amy Tan, ballerina Misty Copeland, actor Rob Lowe, skier Mikaela Shiffrin and director Baz Luhrmann		
October 18	Actor Jeff Goldblum	Tom Bodett, Roxanne Roberts, Faith Salie	Show recorded in Pittsburgh, Pennsylvania
October 25	Actress Florence Henderson	Brian Babylon, Amy Dickinson, Roy Blount, Jr.	

== November ==
Date	Guest	Panelists	Notes
November 1	Actor Daniel Radcliffe	Luke Burbank, Kyrie O'Connor, Alonzo Bodden	
November 8	Country singer Dale Watson	Bobcat Goldthwait, Faith Salie, Tom Bodett	Show recorded in Austin, Texas
November 15	Actor Ron Perlman	Alonzo Bodden, Roxanne Roberts, Maz Jobrani	
November 22	TV personality and producer Andy Cohen	Amy Dickinson, P. J. O'Rourke, Paula Poundstone	
November 29	"Best of" episode featuring violinist Itzhak Perlman and comedian Amy Schumer		

== December ==
Date	Guest	Panelists	Notes
December 6	Drummer Max Weinberg	Mo Rocca, Faith Salie, Adam Felber	Show recorded in Newark, New Jersey
December 13	Actor Patrick Stewart	Shelby Fero, Charlie Pierce, Tom Bodett	
December 20	Comedian Jenny Slate	Roxanne Roberts, Maz Jobrani, Paula Poundstone	
December 27	"Best of 2014" episode		
