= List of Wait Wait... Don't Tell Me! episodes (2010) =

The following is a list of episodes of Wait Wait... Don't Tell Me!, NPR's news panel game, that aired during 2010. All episodes, unless otherwise indicated, are hosted by Peter Sagal with announcer/scorekeeper Carl Kassell, and originated at Chicago's Chase Auditorium. Job titles and backgrounds of the guests reflect their status at the time of their appearance.

== January ==
Date	Guest	Panelists	Notes
January 2	"Best of" episode featuring NBC news anchor Brian Williams		
January 9	Actress Lucy Lawless	Kyrie O'Connor, Paul Provenza, Paula Poundstone	
January 16	John Flansburgh and John Linnell of the alternative rock group They Might Be Giants	Faith Salie, Charlie Pierce, Mo Rocca	
January 23	Author Mark Halperin	Amy Dickinson, Adam Felber, P. J. O'Rourke	
January 30	Pop singer Neil Sedaka	Roxanne Roberts, Luke Burbank, Tom Bodett	

== February ==
Date	Guest	Panelists	Notes
February 6	United States Secretary of Energy Steven Chu	Adam Felber, Mo Rocca, Julia Sweeney	
February 13	Houston mayor Annise Parker	Kyrie O'Connor, Tom Bodett, Paula Poundstone	Show recorded at Wortham Center in Houston, TX
February 20	Best of "Not My Job," featuring actors Ed Helms and Ashley Judd, skateboarder Tony Hawk, comedian Susie Essman, and storm chaser Reed Timmer		
February 27	Good Morning America co-anchor George Stephanopoulos	Roy Blount, Jr., Charlie Pierce, Roxanne Roberts	Guest announcer/scorekeeper Jean Cochran

== March ==
Date	Guest	Panelists	Notes
March 6	Actor Tony Shalhoub	Luke Burbank, Kyrie O'Connor, Paula Poundstone	
March 13	Bassist George Porter Jr. of The Meters	Roy Blount, Jr., Amy Dickinson, Mo Rocca	Show recorded in New Orleans, LA
March 20	Musician Paddy Moloney of The Chieftains	Charlie Pierce, Paul Provenza, Faith Salie	
March 27	Author Michael Lewis	Tom Bodett, Keegan-Michael Key, Roxanne Roberts	

== April ==
Date	Guest	Panelists	Notes
April 3	Musicians Dusty Hill and Billy Gibbons of ZZ Top	Tom Bodett, Kyrie O'Connor, Paula Poundstone	Money and finance-themed episode Show recorded at Wortham Center in Houston, TX
April 10	Singers Felipe Rose and David Hodo of The Village People	Luke Burbank, Adam Felber, Kyrie O'Connor	
April 17	Former pro football quarterback Kurt Warner	Charlie Pierce, Roxanne Roberts, Mo Rocca	Show recorded at Powell Symphony Hall in St. Louis, MO
April 24	ESPN baseball writer Buster Olney	Tom Bodett, P. J. O'Rourke, Paula Poundstone	

== May ==
Date	Guest	Panelists	Notes
May 1	Film producer Jerry Weintraub	Roy Blount, Jr., Amy Dickinson, Keegan-Michael Key	
May 8	Lieutenant General Michael C. Gould, superintendent of the U.S. Air Force Academy	Tom Bodett, Paul Provenza, Faith Salie	Show recorded at Pikes Peak Center in Colorado Springs, CO
May 15	Rapper and actor Ice-T	Roy Blount, Jr., Amy Dickinson, Paula Poundstone	
May 22	Music-themed "Best of" episode, featuring They Might Be Giants, George Porter Jr., Branford Marsalis, Neil Sedaka, and Joseph "Rev. Run" Simmons		
May 29	Soul singer Bettye LaVette	Charlie Pierce, Roxanne Roberts, Mo Rocca	

== June ==
Date	Guest	Panelists	Notes
June 5	Novelist Tom Robbins	Tom Bodett, Luke Burbank, Paula Poundstone	Show recorded at Paramount Theatre in Seattle, WA
June 12	Comedian Robert Klein	Charlie Pierce, Paula Poundstone, Roxanne Roberts	
June 19	CNN correspondent Sanjay Gupta	Tom Bodett, Amy Dickinson, Peter Grosz	
June 26	Explorer Ann Bancroft	Adam Felber, Kyrie O'Connor, Mo Rocca	Show recorded at State Theatre in Minneapolis, MN

== July ==
Date	Guest	Panelists	Notes
July 3	Actress Molly Ringwald	P. J. O'Rourke, Paula Poundstone, Julia Sweeney	
July 10	"Best of" episode featuring food expert Michael Pollan and comedian and TV host Craig Ferguson		
July 17	Seattle Seahawks head coach Pete Carroll	Charlie Pierce, Kyrie O'Connor, Mo Rocca	
July 24	Singer Craig Finn of The Hold Steady	Adam Felber, Keegan-Michael Key, Roxanne Roberts	
July 31	Comedian Maz Jobrani	Roy Blount, Jr., Amy Dickinson, Paul Provenza	

== August ==
Date	Guest	Panelists	Notes
August 7	Caressa Cameron, Miss America 2010	Luke Burbank, Adam Felber, Faith Salie	
August 14	Comedian Kristen Schaal	Roy Blount, Jr., Charlie Pierce, Paula Poundstone	Guest host Peter Grosz
August 21	Encore of money-themed 4/3/2010 episode recorded in Houston, TX and featuring ZZ Top's Billy Gibbons & Dusty Hill		
August 28	Listener-requested "Best of" episode, featuring rappers Ice-T and Sir Mix-A-Lot, actor Tony Shalhoub, and author Tom Robbins		

== September ==
Date	Guest	Panelists	Notes
September 4	Political personality Meghan McCain	Adam Felber, Maz Jobrani, Roxanne Roberts	Guest announcer/scorekeeper Korva Coleman
September 11	Comedian Lisa Lampanelli	Tom Bodett, Peter Grosz, Faith Salie	
September 18	Science writer Mary Roach	Luke Burbank, Paula Poundstone, Paul Provenza	
September 25	Rodeo personality Delmar Smith	Mo Rocca, Kyrie O'Connor, Charlie Pierce	Show recorded at the Oklahoma City Civic Center

== October ==
Date	Guest	Panelists	Notes
October 2	Mac McCaughan of the rock band Superchunk	Alonzo Bodden, Amy Dickinson, Roy Blount, Jr.	
October 9	New York City Mayor Michael Bloomberg	Charlie Pierce, Roxanne Roberts, Tom Bodett	Show recorded at New York's Carnegie Hall
October 16	Encore of family-themed 12/26/2009 episode recorded in Pasadena, CA and featuring actor George Takei		
October 23	Actor Dick Van Dyke	Peter Grosz, Kyrie O'Connor, Mo Rocca	
October 30	Musician Bobby McFerrin	Tom Bodett, Amy Dickinson, P. J. O'Rourke	Show recorded at Academy of Music in Philadelphia, Pennsylvania

== November ==
Date	Guest	Panelists	Notes
November 6	Singer/songwriter Elvis Costello	Mo Rocca, Roxanne Roberts, Charlie Pierce	
November 13	Soap opera actress Tina Sloan	Alonzo Bodden, Tom Bodett, Kyrie O'Connor	
November 20	Singer/entertainer Wayne Newton	Faith Salie, Adam Felber, Paula Poundstone	Show recorded at Paris Casino in Las Vegas, NV
November 27	Animal-themed "Best of" episode, featuring veterinarian Kevin Fitzgerald and animal expert Bob Freer		

== December ==
Date	Guest	Panelists	Notes
December 4	TV personality Mike Rowe	Paula Poundstone, Roxanne Roberts, Luke Burbank	
December 11	Steve Wozniak, co-founder of Apple Inc.	Roy Blount, Jr., Amy Dickinson, Maz Jobrani	
December 18	Composer Alan Menken	Peter Grosz, Kyrie O'Connor, Adam Felber	
December 25	Best of "Not My Job" featuring actors Dick Van Dyke and Tony Shalhoub, comedians Denis Leary and Amy Sedaris, and humorist John Hodgman		
