= List of Wait Wait... Don't Tell Me! episodes (2004) =

The following is a list of episodes of Wait Wait... Don't Tell Me!, NPR's news panel game, that aired during 2004. All episodes, unless otherwise indicated, feature host Peter Sagal and announcer/scorekeeper Carl Kasell, and originated from the studios of WBEZ/Chicago. Dates indicated are the episodes' original Saturday air dates. Job titles and backgrounds of the guests reflect their status at the time of their appearance.

== January ==
Date	Guests	Panelists	Notes
January 3	This American Life host Ira Glass	Charlie Pierce, Roxanne Roberts, Mo Rocca	Show recorded at Chicago's Bank One Auditorium; Episode theme: Historical facts and legends
January 10	Songwriters Barry Mann and Cynthia Weil	Roy Blount, Jr., Adam Felber, Paula Poundstone	
January 17	Patrick Smith, writer of Salon.com's "Ask the Pilot" column	Roy Blount, Jr., Sue Ellicott, P.J. O'Rourke	
January 24	MTV News reporter Gideon Yago	Adam Felber, Charlie Pierce, Roxanne Roberts	
January 31	AutoWeek columnist and former race car driver Denise McCluggage	Roy Blount, Jr., Charlie Pierce, Paula Poundstone	

== February ==
Date	Guest	Panelists	Notes
February 7	Comedian/actress Aisha Tyler	Roy Blount, Jr., Sue Ellicott, Adam Felber	Guest announcer/scorekeeper Jean Cochran
February 14	Science expert Bill Nye	Charlie Pierce, Roxanne Roberts, Mo Rocca	
February 21	Soul singer Sam Moore	Adam Felber, Charlie Pierce, Roxanne Roberts	Show recorded at in Phoenix, Arizona, (Arizona Biltmore Hotel)
February 28	Comedian Omid Djalili	Roy Blount, Jr., Sue Ellicott, Adam Felber	Show recorded at Chicago's Bank One Auditorium

== March ==
Date	Guest	Panelists	Notes
March 6	Writer/teacher/actress Anna Deavere Smith	Charlie Pierce, Roxanne Roberts, Mo Rocca	
March 13	Actor Jon Favreau	Mo Rocca, Sue Ellicott, Paula Poundstone	Show recorded in Pasadena, California, (Beckman Auditorium)
March 20	CNN reporter Jeff Greenfield	Roxanne Roberts, Adam Felber, P.J. O'Rourke	
March 27	New York Times ombudsman Daniel Okrent	Adam Felber, Roy Blount, Jr., Karen Grigsby Bates	

== April ==
Date	Guest	Panelists	Notes
April 3	Restaurateur and PBS host Rick Bayless	P.J. O'Rourke, Charlie Pierce, Paula Poundstone	Show recorded at Chicago's Bank One Auditorium
April 10	Actor Cary Elwes	Charlie Pierce, Roy Blount, Jr., Sue Ellicott	
April 17	NPR correspondent Don Gonyea	Charlie Pierce, Adam Felber, Roxanne Roberts	
April 24	Chicago Cubs President/CEO Andy MacPhail	Roy Blount, Jr., Adam Felber, Roxanne Roberts	Show recorded at Chicago's Bank One Auditorium

== May ==
Date	Guest	Panelists	Notes
May 1	Author Lynne Truss	Adam Felber, Karen Grigsby Bates, Charlie Pierce	
May 8	NPR legal affairs correspondent Nina Totenberg	Adam Felber, Charlie Pierce, Sue Ellicott	
May 15	NPR All Things Considered news analysts David Brooks and EJ Dionne	P.J. O'Rourke, Roxanne Roberts, Mo Rocca	Show recorded in Washington, D.C. (Lincoln Theatre)
May 22	Thoroughbred horse trainer John Servis	Adam Felber, Roxanne Roberts, Roy Blount, Jr.	
May 29	Former NPR Morning Edition host Bob Edwards	Sue Ellicott, P.J. O'Rourke, Paula Poundstone	

== June ==
Date	Guests	Panelists	Notes
June 5	Evelyn and Monica Brady, co-founders of The Golden Trailer Awards	Roy Blount, Jr., Charlie Pierce, Roxanne Roberts	
June 12	Comedian Dylan Moran	Roy Blount, Jr., Roxanne Roberts, Adam Felber	Guest announcer/scorekeeper Jean Cochran
June 19	Political consultant and Harvard University professor Donna Brazile	Adam Felber, Charlie Pierce, Sue Ellicott	Guest announcer/scorekeeper Corey Flintoff
June 26	Culinary writer Steven Raichlen	Sue Ellicott, P.J. O'Rourke, Mo Rocca	Guest announcer/scorekeeper Corey Flintoff

== July ==
Date	Guest	Panelists
July 3	Encore of history-themed 1/3/2004 episode from Chicago's Bank One Auditorium and featuring This American Life host Ira Glass	
July 10	Activist and former politician Tom Hayden	Adam Felber, Charlie Pierce, Paula Poundstone
July 17	Hearst Newspapers columnist and White House reporter Helen Thomas	Charlie Pierce, Roy Blount, Jr., Roxanne Roberts
July 24	Former Texas governor Ann Richards	Charlie Pierce, Sue Ellicott, Mo Rocca
July 31	Newsday columnist Jimmy Breslin	Roy Blount, Jr., Roxanne Roberts, P.J. O'Rourke

== August ==
Date	Guest	Panelists	Notes
August 7	Author Scott Turow	Roy Blount, Jr., Sue Ellicott, Richard Roeper	Show recorded in Chicago's Millennium Park (Jay Pritzker Pavilion)
August 14	Republican National Committee chairman Ed Gillespie	Adam Felber, P.J. O'Rourke, Roxanne Roberts	Guest host Richard Sher
August 21	Cartoonist Tony Cochrane	Roxanne Roberts, Adam Felber, Mo Rocca	Show recorded in Columbus, Ohio, (Ohio Theatre)
August 28	Sex & relationship expert Dr. Ruth Westheimer	Roy Blount, Jr., Sue Ellicott, Charlie Pierce	

== September ==
Date	Guest	Panelists	Notes
September 4	Newsday columnist Jimmy Breslin	Roy Blount, Jr., Roxanne Roberts, Richard Roeper	
September 11	Beach volleyball star Kerri Walsh	Roy Blount, Jr., Paula Poundstone, Mo Rocca	
September 18	Syracuse Orange men's basketball head coach Jim Boeheim	Mo Rocca, Sue Ellicott, Charlie Pierce	Show recorded in Syracuse, New York, (Mulroy Civic Center)
September 25	Connecticut governor Jodi Rell	Sue Ellicott, Charlie Pierce, P.J. O'Rourke	Show recorded in New Haven, Connecticut, (John Lyman Center at Southern Connecticut State University)

== October ==
Date	Guest	Panelists	Notes
October 2	no guest	Sue Ellicott, Adam Felber, Paula Poundstone	
October 9	Greg Marinak, executive director of the Ansari X Prize	Adam Felber, Roy Blount, Jr., Roxanne Roberts	
October 16	Actor/comedian Ricky Gervais	Paula Poundstone, Kyrie O'Connor, Charlie Pierce	
October 23	no guest	Roy Blount, Jr., Charlie Pierce, Roxanne Roberts	
October 30	Mystery writer Laura Lippman	Adam Felber, Charlie Pierce, Roxanne Roberts	Show recorded in Towson, Maryland, (Kraushaar Auditorium at Goucher College)

== November ==
Date	Guest	Panelists	Notes
November 6	Author James Ellroy	Sue Ellicott, Adam Felber, Richard Roeper	
November 13	TV host Phil Keoghan	Roy Blount, Jr., Paula Poundstone, Mo Rocca	
November 20	Musician and producer Michael Nesmith	Sue Ellicott, Adam Felber, Kyrie O'Connor	Show recorded in Pacific Grove, California, (Merrill Hall at Asilomar Conference Grounds)
November 27	Encore of political history-themed 11/29/2003 episode recorded in Durham, North Carolina, and featuring Durham Bulls PA announcer Bill Law		

== December ==
Date	Guest	Panelists	Notes
December 4	Tony Magaldi, general manager of South Beach's News Cafe	Charlie Pierce, Paula Poundstone, Roxanne Roberts	Show recorded in Fort Lauderdale, Florida, (Parker Playhouse)
December 11	Ruth Reichl, editor-in-chief of Gourmet magazine	Adam Felber, Kyrie O'Connor, P.J. O'Rourke	
December 18	NPR Morning Edition hosts Steve Inskeep and Renée Montagne	Adam Felber, Roy Blount, Jr., Sue Ellicott	
December 25	Encores of various segments, including an interview with This American Life host Ira Glass		
