= List of Wait Wait... Don't Tell Me! episodes (2008) =

This is a list of Wait Wait... Don't Tell Me! guests for 2008. Data is taken from the Wait Wait... Don't Tell Me! Archives. Job titles reflect the position of individuals at the time of the appearance. All shows, unless otherwise indicated, are hosted by Peter Sagal with announcer/scorekeeper Carl Kassell and are taped at Chicago's Chase Auditorium.

== January ==
Date	Guest	Panelists	Notes
January 5	Singer Linda Ronstadt	Paula Poundstone, Adam Felber, Sue Ellicott	Encore from April 2007
January 12	Democratic political consultant and commentator Paul Begala	Adam Felber, Amy Dickinson, Tom Bodett	
January 19	Animator, Writer and Director Brad Bird	Kyrie O'Connor, Roy Blount Jr., Mo Rocca	
January 26	Singer Melissa Etheridge	Charlie Pierce, Paul Provenza, Roxanne Roberts	

== February ==
Date	Guest	Panelists	Notes
February 2	Atlanta Falcons Quarterback Joey Harrington	Adam Felber, Paula Poundstone, Luke Burbank	
February 9	Arizona Governor Janet Napolitano	Kyrie O'Connor, Adam Felber, Paul Provenza	Show recorded in Mesa, AZ (Ikeda Theater)
February 16	Ultimate Fighting Championship star Chuck "The Iceman" Liddell	Roxanne Roberts, Tom Bodett, P. J. O'Rourke	
February 23	Actor and comedian Drew Carey	Paula Poundstone, Luke Burbank, Mo Rocca	Guest scorekeeper Korva Coleman

== March ==
Date	Guest	Panelists	Notes
March 1	Lead singer of The Blind Boys of Alabama Jimmy Carter	Charlie Pierce, Roy Blount Jr., Paula Poundstone	Show recorded in Birmingham, AL (Samford University Wright Center)
March 8	U.S. Secretary of Education Margaret Spellings	Amy Dickinson, Paul Provenza, Roy Blount Jr.	
March 15	Governor of Pennsylvania Ed Rendell	Roxanne Roberts, Tom Bodett, Mo Rocca	Show recorded in Pittsburgh, PA (Byham Theater)
March 22	Columnist for the New York Times, Maureen Dowd	Kyrie O'Connor, P. J. O'Rourke, Charlie Pierce	
March 29	Author and actress Fannie Flagg	Kyrie O'Connor, Paul Provenza, Paula Poundstone	Show recorded in Santa Barbara, CA (UC Santa Barbara Arts & Lectures)

== April ==
Date	Guest	Panelists	Notes
April 5	Actor Neil Patrick Harris	Kyrie O'Connor, Tom Bodett, Mo Rocca	
April 12	Actress Kim Cattrall	Roxanne Roberts, Tom Bodett, Paula Poundstone	
April 19	Actress Jane Curtin	Roy Blount Jr., Roxanne Roberts, Tom Bodett	Show recorded in Hartford, CT (The Bushnell Center for the Performing Arts)
April 26	Musician and songwriter Moby	Charlie Pierce, Kyrie O'Connor, Drew Carey	Guest scorekeeper Korva Coleman

== May ==
Date	Guest	Panelists	Notes
May 3	Author Stephen King	Adam Felber, Roy Blount Jr., Paula Poundstone	
May 10	Co-host of MythBusters, Adam Savage	Charlie Pierce, Amy Dickinson, Mo Rocca	Show recorded in Schenectady, NY (Proctor's Theatre)
May 17	Former Minnesota governor and professional wrestler Jesse Ventura	P. J. O'Rourke, Roy Blount Jr., Amy Dickinson	
May 24	Author and former New York Times columnist William Safire	Adam Felber, Kyrie O'Connor, Tom Bodett	
May 31	"Clip show," featuring Stephen Breyer, Elizabeth Edwards, Barack Obama, and Al Michaels		

== June ==
Date	Guest	Panelists	Notes
June 7	U.S. Senator from Virginia, Jim Webb	Tom Bodett, Roxanne Roberts, P. J. O'Rourke	Show recorded in Virginia Beach, VA (Sandler Center for the Performing Arts)
June 14	Former White House Press Secretary Scott McClellan	Roy Blount Jr., Charlie Pierce, Amy Dickinson	
June 21	U.S. Senator from Illinois, Dick Durbin	Kyrie O'Connor, Mo Rocca, Paul Provenza	
June 28	Sub Pop Records Founder Jonathan Poneman	Adam Felber, Paul Provenza, Paula Poundstone	Show recorded in Seattle, WA (Paramount Theatre)

== July ==
Date	Guest	Panelists	Notes
July 5	"Clip show," featuring Craig Ferguson, Dave Barry, Gwen Ifill, Calvin Trillin, and Kevin Clash		
July 12	NBC News Correspondent Andrea Mitchell	Roxanne Roberts, Charlie Pierce, Tom Bodett	
July 19	Cult film director John Waters	Charlie Pierce, Amy Dickinson, Paul Provenza	Guest host Adam Felber
July 26	Film director and actor Peter Bogdanovich	Paul Provenza, Kyrie O'Connor, Mo Rocca	Guest host Adam Felber

== August ==
Date	Guest	Panelists	Notes
August 2	CNN correspondent Jeanne Moos	Roy Blount Jr., Paula Poundstone, Alison Stewart	
August 9	Actress Debra Winger	Charlie Pierce, Roxanne Roberts, Paula Poundstone	Guest scorekeeper Corey Flintoff
August 16	Comedian Lewis Black	Kyrie O'Connor, Adam Felber, Mo Rocca	Guest scorekeeper Korva Coleman
August 23	U.S. Attorney Patrick Fitzgerald	Adam Felber, Roxanne Roberts, Roy Blount Jr.	Encore from July 2007
August 30	Olympic Gold Medal gymnast Nastia Liukin	Roy Blount Jr., Alison Stewart, Tom Bodett	

== September ==
Date	Guest	Panelists	Notes
September 6	Retired baseball player Bill "Moose" Skowron	Tom Bodett, Paula Poundstone, Mo Rocca	Show recorded in Millennium Park (Jay Pritzker Pavilion)
September 13	Sportswriter Stefan Fatsis	Paul Provenza, Roy Blount Jr., Amy Dickinson	
September 20	Actor Leonard Nimoy	Charlie Pierce, Roxanne Roberts, Paula Poundstone	
September 27	Former U.S. Senator George McGovern	Tom Bodett, Kyrie O'Connor, Mo Rocca	Show recorded in Sioux Falls, SD (Orpheum Theater Center)

== October ==
Date	Guest	Panelists	Notes
October 4	TV host "Dr. Phil" McGraw	Roxanne Roberts, Mo Rocca, Paul Provenza	
October 11	Writer and host of A Prairie Home Companion, Garrison Keillor	Roy Blount Jr., Tom Bodett, Alison Stewart	
October 18	"Clip show," featuring Neil Patrick Harris, Stephen King, William Safire, Fannie Flagg, and Scott McClellan		
October 25	Author and columnist Christopher Buckley	Kyrie O'Connor, Tom Bodett, Charlie Pierce	Show recorded in New Haven, CT (John Lyman Center at Southern Connecticut State University)

== November ==
Date	Guest	Panelists	Notes
November 1	Author and humorist John Hodgman	Paul Provenza, Paula Poundstone, Amy Dickinson	
November 8	U.S. Congressman Barney Frank	Amy Dickisnon, Charlie Pierce, Mo Rocca	Show recorded in Boston, MA (Wang Theatre)
November 15	Journalist and news anchor Tom Brokaw	P. J. O'Rourke, Kyrie O'Connor, Tom Bodett	
November 22	Former football player Tiki Barber	Roxanne Roberts, Adam Felber, Paula Poundstone	
November 29	"Clip show," featuring Chris Paul, Valerie Plame Wilson, Michael Moore, and Robert Lutz		

== December ==
Date	Guest	Panelists
December 6	Actor and comedian Denis Leary	Adam Felber, Mo Rocca, Kyrie O'Connor
December 13	Director of the CIA, Michael Hayden	Roxanne Roberts, Paula Poundstone, Tom Bodett
December 20	Singer Mavis Staples	Roy Blount Jr., Charlie Pierce, Amy Dickinson
December 27	"Clip show," featuring Dana Perino, Chris Dodd, Tom Tancredo, Tommy Thompson, Hillary Clinton, Mike Huckabee, and Barack Obama	
