= List of Wait Wait... Don't Tell Me! episodes (2001) =

The following is a list of episodes of Wait Wait... Don't Tell Me!, NPR's news panel game, that aired during 2001. The episodes, unless otherwise indicated, were hosted by Peter Sagal, with Carl Kasell serving as announcer and scorekeeper. Dates indicated are the episodes' original Saturday air dates. Job titles and backgrounds of the guests reflect their status at the time of their appearance.

== January ==
Date	Guest	Panelists
January 6	Singer/songwriter Dan Bern	Sue Ellicott, Adam Felber, Charlie Pierce
January 13	NPR New York correspondent Melissa Block	Adam Felber, Charlie Pierce, Roxanne Roberts
January 20	Robert Siegel, the editor-in-chief of the satirical magazine the Onion	Sue Ellicott, Adam Felber, Patt Morrison
January 27	Singer Loudon Wainwright III	Sue Ellicott, Charlie Pierce, Roxanne Roberts

== February ==
Date	Guest	Panelists	Notes
February 3	Ambassador and former U.S. Senator George McGovern	Roy Blount, Jr., Adam Felber, Roxanne Roberts	
February 10	NPR White House correspondent Don Gonyea	Adam Felber, Sue Ellicott, Charlie Pierce	Guest announcer/scorekeeper Corey Flintoff
February 17	Writer and Morning Edition sports commentator Frank DeFord	Charlie Pierce, Roxanne Roberts, Paula Poundstone	Guest announcer/scorekeeper Corey Flintoff
February 24	Amy Reiter, people columnist for Salon.com	Adam Felber, Charlie Pierce, Roxanne Roberts	Guest announcer/scorekeeper Corey Flintoff

== March ==
Date	Guest	Panelists
March 3	Author Simon Winchester	Sue Ellicott, Adam Felber, Charlie Pierce
March 10	NPR Car Talk hosts Tom and Ray Magliozzi	Sue Ellicott, Charlie Pierce, Roy Blount, Jr.
March 17	NPR Performance Today host Fred Child	Adam Felber, Patt Morrison, Roxanne Roberts
March 24	Lloyd Kaufman, president of Troma Films	Adam Felber, Charlie Pierce, Paula Poundstone
March 31	Author and NPR commentator Gwen Macsai	Sue Ellicott, Adam Felber, Roxanne Roberts

== April ==
Date	Guest	Panelists
April 7	Impressionist Jim Morris	Adam Felber, Charlie Pierce, Roxanne Roberts
April 14	Actor/comedian Fred Willard	Adam Felber, Charlie Pierce, Patt Morrison
April 21	NPR On the Media co-host Bob Garfield	Adam Felber, Roxanne Roberts, Sue Ellicott
April 28	Comedienne and author Margaret Cho	Sue Ellicott, Charlie Pierce, Roy Blount, Jr.

== May ==
Date	Guest	Panelists
May 5	NPR All Things Considered host Linda Wertheimer	Adam Felber, Charlie Pierce, Roxanne Roberts
May 12	Columnist and pundit Andrew Sullivan	Adam Felber, Charlie Pierce, Paula Poundstone
May 19	Columnist and author Dan Savage	Adam Felber, Roy Blount, Jr., Sue Ellicott
May 26	Commentator and author Sandra Tsing Loh	Adam Felber, Charlie Pierce, Roxanne Roberts

== June ==
Date	Guest	Panelists
June 2	Actress Amy Carlson	Adam Felber, Paula Poundstone, Roxanne Roberts
June 9	Actor Dan Castellaneta	Adam Felber, Patt Morrison, Charlie Pierce
June 16	Will Shortz, New York Times crossword editor and NPR Weekend Edition Sunday puzzle expert	Adam Felber, Charlie Pierce, Roxanne Roberts
June 23	Author Martin Amis	Adam Felber, Roy Blount, Jr., Sue Ellicott
June 30	Actor John Mahoney	Roy Blount, Jr., Charlie Pierce, Roxanne Roberts

== July ==
Date	Guest	Panelists	Notes
July 7	Encore of 5/27/2000 episode featuring NPR legal affairs correspondent Nina Totenberg		
July 14	Author Sherman Alexie	Sue Ellicott, Patt Morrison, Charlie Pierce	
July 21	Rock musician and producer Steve Albini	Roy Blount, Jr., Adam Felber, Roxanne Roberts	
July 28	Jane editor/publisher Jane Pratt	Patt Morrison, Charlie Pierce, Roxanne Roberts	Guest announcer/scorekeeper Jean Cochran

== August ==
Date	Guest	Panelists	Notes
August 4	Cartoonist Bill Griffith	Roy Blount, Jr., Sue Ellicott, Adam Felber	Guest announcer/scorekeeper Jean Cochran
August 11	NPR Weekend All Things Considered host Lisa Simeone	Sue Ellicott, Adam Felber, Charlie Pierce	Guest announcer/scorekeeper Jean Cochran
August 18	Author Moon Unit Zappa	Sue Ellicott, Charlie Pierce, Roxanne Roberts	Guest announcer/scorekeeper Jean Cochran
August 25	Paleontologist Paul Sereno	Roy Blount, Jr., Sue Ellicott, Roxanne Roberts	

== September ==
Date	Guest	Panelists	Notes
September 1	Actor/writer/author Al Franken	Sue Ellicott, Charlie Pierce, Roxanne Roberts	Guest host Adam Felber
September 8	Author Salman Rushdie	Roxanne Roberts, Roy Blount, Jr., Adam Felber	
September 22	Humorist and author P.J. O'Rourke	Adam Felber, Charlie Pierce, Roxanne Roberts	
September 29	Author and Studio 360 host Kurt Andersen	Roy Blount, Jr., Sue Ellicott, Evan Smith	Guest host Adam Felber

== October ==
Date	Guest	Panelists
October 6	Bill Bastone, founder and editor of The Smoking Gun website	Roy Blount, Jr., Sue Ellicott, Adam Felber
October 13	Musician John Flansburgh of They Might Be Giants	Adam Felber, Charlie Pierce, Roxanne Roberts
October 20	Yoga master Rodney Yee	Roy Blount, Jr., Sue Ellicott, Charlie Pierce
October 27	Lawyer and author Jeffrey Toobin	Roy Blount, Jr., Adam Felber, Roxanne Roberts

== November ==
Date	Guest	Panelists	Notes
November 3	Tom and Dave Gardner of the Motley Fool investment site	Adam Felber, Charlie Pierce, Roxanne Roberts	
November 10	Dan Perkins (aka Tom Tomorrow), creator of the comic strip This Modern World	Roxanne Roberts, Roy Blount, Jr., Evan Smith	
November 17	Musician Gene Simmons of the rock band, Kiss	Roy Blount, Jr., Sue Ellicott, P.J. O'Rourke	Guest announcer/scorekeeper Jean Cochran
November 24	Encore of 12/30/2000 episode featuring All Things Considered host Robert Siegel		

== December ==
Date	Guest	Panelists	Notes
December 1	Arizona Diamondbacks vice-president/general manager Joe Garagiola, Jr.	Sue Ellicott, Adam Felber, Charlie Pierce	
December 8	Actor & writer Simon Callow	Sue Ellicott, Adam Felber, Charlie Pierce	Guest announcer/scorekeeper Jean Cochran
December 15	NPR & ABC news analyst Cokie Roberts	Charlie Pierce, Roy Blount, Jr., Roxanne Roberts	Guest announcer/scorekeeper Jean Cochran
December 22	Monologist Spalding Gray	Charlie Pierce, Roxanne Roberts, Evan Smith	
December 29	Former U.S. Secretary of State Madeleine Albright	Sue Ellicott, Adam Felber, Charlie Pierce	
