= List of Wait Wait... Don't Tell Me! episodes (2003) =

The following is a list of episodes of Wait Wait... Don't Tell Me!, NPR's news quiz program, that aired during 2003. All episodes, unless otherwise indicated, were hosted by Peter Sagal and announcer/scorekeeper Carl Kassell, and originated from the studios of Chicago's WBEZ. Dates indicated are the episodes' original Saturday air dates. Job titles of the guests reflect their job position or status at the time of their appearance.

== January ==
Date	Guests	Panelists	Notes
January 4	Film critics Roger Ebert and Richard Roeper	Roy Blount, Jr., Sue Ellicott, Charlie Pierce	Show recorded at Chicago's Goodman Theatre; Wait Wait's 5th anniversary commemoration
January 11	Former boxing champion George Foreman	Sue Ellicott, Adam Felber, P.J. O'Rourke	
January 18	Actor Joe Pantoliano	Adam Felber, Roxanne Roberts, Mo Rocca	
January 25	Cowboy poet and NPR Morning Edition commentator Baxter Black	Roy Blount, Jr., Roxanne Roberts, Paula Poundstone	

== February ==
Date	Guest	Panelists	Notes
February 1	NPR All Things Considered host Melissa Block	Sue Ellicott, Adam Felber, Charlie Pierce	Guest announcer/scorekeeper Corey Flintoff
February 8	Humorist and author Arianna Huffington	Roy Blount, Jr., Paula Poundstone, Mo Rocca	
February 15	Actress Eva Marie Saint	Adam Felber, P.J. O'Rourke, Roxanne Roberts	
February 22	Author Nick Hornby	Adam Felber, Charlie Pierce, Roxanne Roberts	

== March ==
Date	Guest	Panelists
March 1	Fashion designer Isaac Mizrahi	Sue Ellicott, P.J. O'Rourke, Charlie Pierce
March 8	Film producer Neil Meron	Roy Blount, Jr., Roxanne Roberts, Mo Rocca
March 15	Comedy writer Bruce Vilanch	Sue Ellicott, Charlie Pierce, Adam Felber
March 22	Author and former Presidential aide Michael Deaver	Roy Blount, Jr., Charlie Pierce, Roxanne Roberts
March 29	ESPN SportsCenter anchor Linda Cohn	Sue Ellicott, Adam Felber, Paula Poundstone

== April ==
Date	Guests	Panelists	Notes
April 5	Jane Scott, former rock critic for Cleveland's The Plain Dealer	Adam Felber, Roxanne Roberts, Mo Rocca	Show recorded at Akron Civic Theatre in Akron, OH
April 12	Actor and Monty Python alumnus Michael Palin	Adam Felber, Sue Ellicott, Charlie Pierce	
April 19	Actors Sean Foley and Hamish McColl	Charlie Pierce, Roxanne Roberts, Mo Rocca	
April 26	Film producer and former MTV veejay Alan Hunter	Sue Ellicott, Adam Felber, Charlie Pierce	Show recorded at Bama Theatre in Tuscaloosa, AL

== May ==
Date	Guest	Panelists	Notes
May 3	Humorist and writer Al Franken	Adam Felber, Paula Poundstone, Roxanne Roberts	
May 10	Former NFL head coach and Hall of Fame tight end Mike Ditka	Adam Felber, Roxanne Roberts, Charlie Pierce	
May 17	Puppeteer Caroll Spinney	Roy Blount, Jr., Sue Ellicott, P.J. O'Rourke	
May 24	Comedian and writer Carl Reiner	Charlie Pierce, Roxanne Roberts, Mo Rocca	
May 31	Former Arkansas governor and senator Dale Bumpers	Sue Ellicott, Adam Felber, Charlie Pierce	Guest announcer/scorekeeper Corey Flintoff

== June ==
Date	Guest	Panelists	Notes
June 7	Singer/songwriter Richard Thompson	Charlie Pierce, Paula Poundstone, Roxanne Roberts	Guest announcer/scorekeeper Corey Flintoff
June 14	Business author (and Peter Sagal's father) Matthew Sagal	Roy Blount, Jr., Sue Ellicott, Mo Rocca	Guest announcer/scorekeeper Corey Flintoff
June 21	Jack Ohman, editorial cartoonist for The Oregonian	Roy Blount, Jr., Sue Ellicott, Charlie Pierce	Show recorded at Arlene Schnitzer Concert Hall in Portland, OR
June 28	Composer/conductor and "P. D. Q. Bach" historian Peter Schickele	Roxanne Roberts, Mo Rocca, Adam Felber	Show recorded at Power Center for the Performing Arts in Ann Arbor, MI

== July ==
Date	Guests	Panelists	Notes
July 5	Encore of 1/4/2003 episode from Chicago's Goodman Theatre featuring film critics Roger Ebert and Richard Roeper		
July 12	Writer and filmmaker Sherman Alexie	Roy Blount, Jr., Sue Ellicott, Charlie Pierce	Guest announcer/scorekeeper Jean Cochran
July 19	Encore of 12/30/2000 episode featuring NPR All Things Considered anchor Robert Siegel		
July 26	Advice columnist Amy Dickinson	Charlie Pierce, Paula Poundstone, Mo Rocca	Guest host Bill Radke

== August ==
Date	Guest	Panelists	Notes
August 2	Journalist and TV host Lisa Ling	Adam Felber, P.J. O'Rourke, Roxanne Roberts	Guest host Bill Radke
August 9	Comedian and TV host Colin Quinn	Roy Blount, Jr., Sue Ellicott, Charlie Pierce	
August 16	Actor Evan Handler	Roy Blount, Jr., P.J. O'Rourke, Roxanne Roberts	
August 23	Actor/writer and TV host Orlando Jones	Roy Blount, Jr., Sue Ellicott, Charlie Pierce	
August 30	Actor and singer Mandy Patinkin	Adam Felber, Roxanne Roberts, Paula Poundstone	

== September ==
Date	Guest	Panelists	Notes
September 6	Culinary expert and Queer Eye for the Straight Guy regular Ted Allen	Adam Felber, Charlie Pierce, Roxanne Roberts	
September 13	TV personality Graham Norton	Sue Ellicott, P.J. O'Rourke, Mo Rocca	
September 20	Film critic Leonard Maltin	Adam Felber, Roxanne Roberts, Paula Poundstone	
September 27	Romance novelist Rebecca Brandewyne	Sue Ellicott, Charlie Pierce, Roy Blount, Jr.	Show recorded in Wichita, KS

== October ==
Date	Guest	Panelists	Notes
October 4	Comic Don Novello	Adam Felber, Charlie Pierce, Roxanne Roberts	
October 11	Sports Illustrated columnist Rick Reilly	Adam Felber, Sue Ellicott, Mo Rocca	
October 18	Cartoonist and author Doug Marlette	Charlie Pierce, Roxanne Roberts, Roy Blount, Jr.	Show recorded at Carolina Theatre in Durham, NC
October 25	CNN Crossfire host Tucker Carlson	Sue Ellicott, Adam Felber, P.J. O'Rourke	

== November ==
Date	Guest	Panelists	Notes
November 1	Columnist and author Molly Ivins	Roy Blount, Jr., Paula Poundstone, Roxanne Roberts	
November 8	New Hampshire Union Leader publisher Joseph W. McQuaid	Roxanne Roberts, Adam Felber, Charlie Pierce	Show recorded at Capitol Center for the Arts in Concord, NH
November 15	Actor Patrick Stewart	Adam Felber, Roy Blount, Jr., Sue Ellicott	
November 22	Biologist and Animal Planet personality Jeff Corwin	Adam Felber, Roy Blount, Jr., Sue Ellicott	
November 29	Durham Bulls PA announcer Bill Law	Roy Blount, Jr., Charlie Pierce, Roxanne Roberts	Show recorded at Carolina Theatre in Durham, NC; Episode theme: Political history

== December ==
Date	Guests	Panelists	Notes
December 6	Former U.S. Secretary of State Madeleine Albright	Sue Ellicott, Adam Felber, Mo Rocca	
December 13	TV host and journalist Harry Smith	Adam Felber, Charlie Pierce, Roxanne Roberts	
December 20	Actor Joel Grey	Sue Ellicott, Mo Rocca, P.J. O'Rourke	Guest announcer/scorekeeper Linda Wertheimer
December 27	Encore of 1/4/2003 episode from Chicago's Goodman Theatre featuring film critics Roger Ebert and Richard Roeper		
