= List of Wait Wait... Don't Tell Me! episodes (2002) =

The following is a list of episodes of Wait Wait... Don't Tell Me!, NPR's news quiz program, that aired during 2002. All episodes, unless otherwise indicated, were hosted by Peter Sagal, with Carl Kassell serving as announcer & scorekeeper. Dates indicated were the episodes' original air dates. Job titles of the guests reflect their job position or status at the time of their appearance.

== January ==
Date	Guest	Panelists
January 5	Blues musician Buddy Guy	Roy Blount, Jr., Adam Felber, Roxanne Roberts
January 12	Illustrator Mary Engelbreit	Adam Felber, Sue Ellicott, P.J. O'Rourke
January 19	Author & humorist Calvin Trillin	Roy Blount, Jr., Roxanne Roberts, Mo Rocca
January 26	Slate columnist Gregg Easterbrook	Roy Blount, Jr., Sue Ellicott, Charlie Pierce

== February ==
Date	Guest	Panelists
February 2	USA Today columnist Christine Brennan	Adam Felber, Charlie Pierce, Roxanne Roberts
February 9	Film critics Roger Ebert and Richard Roeper	Adam Felber, Sue Ellicott, P.J. O'Rourke
February 16	Bill Radke, host of NPR & KUOW-FM/Seattle's Rewind	Roxanne Roberts, Roy Blount, Jr., Evan Smith
February 23	Fiona Ritchie, host of NPR's The Thistle & Shamrock	Adam Felber, Charlie Pierce, Roxanne Roberts

== March ==
Date	Guest	Panelists	Notes
March 2	Musician & composer Randy Newman	Roy Blount, Jr., Sue Ellicott, Charlie Pierce	
March 9	Actor William Mapother	Charlie Pierce, Roxanne Roberts, Mo Rocca	
March 18	CNBC financial journalist Maria Bartiromo	Roy Blount, Jr., Sue Ellicott, Adam Felber	
March 23	Actress Leslie Hope	Adam Felber, Roxanne Roberts, P.J. O'Rourke	Guest announcer/scorekeeper Corey Flintoff
March 30	Voice actress Jane Barbe	Roy Blount, Jr., Sue Ellicott, Mo Rocca	Guest announcer/scorekeeper Corey Flintoff

== April ==
Date	Guest	Panelists
April 6	Comedian/actress Stephnie Weir	Roy Blount, Jr., Adam Felber, Roxanne Roberts
April 13	Lloyd Grove, writer of the Washington Post's "Reliable Source" column	Sue Ellicott, P.J. O'Rourke, Charlie Pierce
April 20	Satirist Neal Pollack	Roy Blount, Jr., Charlie Pierce, Roxanne Roberts
April 27	Singer and actress Eartha Kitt	Adam Felber, Charlie Pierce, Roxanne Roberts

== May ==
Date	Guest	Panelists
May 4	VH1 executive and author Bill Flanagan	Roy Blount, Jr., Adam Felber, Paula Poundstone
May 11	ESPN SportsCenter anchor Kenny Mayne	Charlie Pierce, Roxanne Roberts, Mo Rocca
May 18	NPR host Tavis Smiley	Roy Blount, Jr., Adam Felber, Sue Ellicott
May 25	Playboy advice columnist Chip Rowe	Charlie Pierce, Roxanne Roberts, P.J. O'Rourke

== June ==
Date	Guest	Panelists
June 1	Ray Suarez, senior correspondent for PBS's The NewsHour with Jim Lehrer	Sue Ellicott, Adam Felber, Mo Rocca
June 8	CNN financial anchor Lou Dobbs	Roy Blount, Jr., P.J. O'Rourke, Roxanne Roberts
June 15	Soap opera actress Beth Chamberlin	Sue Ellicott, Adam Felber, Charlie Pierce
June 22	Stage director Mary Zimmerman	Adam Felber, Paula Poundstone, Mo Rocca
June 29	Comedian Louie Anderson	Roy Blount, Jr., Charlie Pierce, Roxanne Roberts

== July ==
Date	Guest	Panelists
July 6	Encore of 1/5/2002 episode featuring blues musician Buddy Guy	
July 13	U.S. Senator Orrin Hatch of Utah	Roy Blount, Jr., Sue Ellicott, Adam Felber
July 20	Bill Scheft, novelist and writer for Late Show with David Letterman	Roy Blount, Jr., P.J. O'Rourke, Roxanne Roberts
July 27	Author Chuck Palahniuk	Charlie Pierce, Paula Poundstone, Mo Rocca

== August ==
Date	Guest	Panelists
August 3	Singer Kathy Mattea	Adam Felber, Charlie Pierce, Roxanne Roberts
August 10	Authors Thisbe Nissen and Erin Ergenbright	Charlie Pierce, Roy Blount, Jr., Sue Ellicott
August 17	Author and NBC Today travel correspondent Peter Greenberg	Sue Ellicott, Adam Felber, Mo Rocca
August 24	Musician Bob Mould	Adam Felber, P.J. O'Rourke, Paula Poundstone
August 31	Songwriter and poet Gary McMahan	Sue Ellicott, Adam Felber, Mo Rocca

== September ==
Date	Guest	Panelists	Notes
September 7	Humorist and author Al Franken	Roy Blount, Jr., Charlie Pierce, Roxanne Roberts	
September 14	Author Clive Barker	Charlie Pierce, Sue Ellicott, Mo Rocca	
September 21	Author Fannie Flagg	Charlie Pierce, Roxanne Roberts, Adam Felber	
September 28	PBS NewsHour anchor Jim Lehrer	Roy Blount, Jr., Sue Ellicott, Mo Rocca	Guest announcer/scorekeeper Jean Cochran

== October ==
Date	Guest	Panelists	Notes
October 5	Las Vegas mayor Oscar Goodman	Roy Blount, Jr., Charlie Pierce, Roxanne Roberts	Show recorded at Sam's Town in Las Vegas, NV
October 12	TV personality and journalist Hugh Downs	Charlie Pierce, Sue Ellicott, Adam Felber	
October 19	Actress Patricia Heaton	Sue Ellicott, Charlie Pierce, Mo Rocca	
October 26	Actor George Wendt	Roxanne Roberts, P.J. O'Rourke, Paula Poundstone	

== November ==
Date	Guest	Panelists
November 2	Magician David Blaine	Roy Blount, Jr., Sue Ellicott, Adam Felber
November 9	Scott Adams, cartoonist and creator of the Dilbert comic strip	Adam Felber, Roxanne Roberts, Mo Rocca
November 16	NPR All Things Considered co-host Michele Norris	Roy Blount, Jr., Roxanne Roberts, Charlie Pierce
November 23	Author Paul Theroux	Sue Ellicott, Adam Felber, Paula Poundstone
November 30	Encore of 5/27/2000 episode featuring NPR legal affairs correspondent Nina Totenberg	

== December ==
Date	Guest	Panelists
December 7	Actor Steve Schirripa	Sue Ellicott, Adam Felber, P.J. O'Rourke
December 14	Screenwriter and director Harold Ramis	Roy Blount, Jr., Roxanne Roberts, Mo Rocca
December 21	Designers and TLC Trading Spaces regulars Genevieve Gorder and Doug Wilson	Roy Blount, Jr., Charlie Pierce, Paula Poundstone
December 28	Encore of 9/7/2002 episode featuring humorist and author Al Franken	
