= Spin the Bottle (media company) =

Manhattan-based media company

Spin The Bottle
- Industry: Mass media Entertainment
- Founded: November 21, 1995; 30 years ago in New York City
- Founders: Tad Low and Woody Thompson
- Headquarters: New York City, New York, United States
- Key people: Tad Low, CEO
- Website: spinthebottle.com

Spin The Bottle is a Manhattan-based media company that creates original programming and content across multiple platforms, including TV, VOD, mobile and broadband sites. The company was founded in 1995 by Emmy winner Tad Low and Woody Thompson. Four of the company's titles have reached #1 in the prime-time slot for their respective networks, including:

- Pop-Up Video, the cultural phenomenon that debuted in 1996 on the then-flagging VH1, later earning 13 Emmy nominations. The series continues to air in prime-time on VH1 Classic.
- Video IQ, the first triple-platform interactive game show in the U.S. (credited with tripling the Fuse network’s time slot ratings).
- Subway Q&A, which earned ten local Emmys for Cablevision’s Metro Channel.
- Pants-Off Dance-Off, which made both Blender and GQ magazines’ “Best of 2006” lists and became the most watched series in Fuse’s history. The series also premiered on Viacom’s VIVA in the UK in 2009 as part of its inaugural launch programming and premiered on Canada’s MuchMusic in 2010.

Spin The Bottle's more recent television series include Pet-O-Rama, Best Places Ever I’ve Ever Been, TXT MSG and Photo ID, which premiered in 2010 on Animal Planet, The Travel Channel, MSG Network and FiOS, respectively.

Spin The Bottle also maintains the entertainment website spinthebottle.com. Original programs include The Truth About (a "Pop-Up Video"-style treatment of breaking news items), First Impressions (an interactive man-on-the-street game), The Baby Taddie Show (a travel series hosted by an opinionated puppet baby) and Spin The Bottle Live (a webcast house party / live music program).

The inventive and playfully subversive spirit of these programs has garnered considerable recognition for Low and his network. Legendary NBC programming chief Brandon Tartikoff told New York magazine that Tad was “one of the great original minds I have seen in my 20 years of television.” The New York Times has called him “an MTV-style Studs Terkel” while Entertainment Weekly crowned him one of “The 100 Most Creative People In Entertainment.”

Low is a former news correspondent and producer for MTV News, FOX, Good Morning America and CBS News. He graduated from Yale University, where he was a member of The Society of Orpheus & Bacchus. Low continues to lecture frequently on media literacy.

== Productions ==
=== Television series ===
| Title | Year(s) | Network |
|---|---|---|
| Best Places I've Ever Been | 2010 | Travel Channel |
| Pants-Off Dance-Off | 2006-2007, 2009, 2010 | Fuse, Viva, MuchMusic |
| Pet-O-Rama | 2010 | Animal Planet |
| Phly | 1998 | WAMI |
| Phly | 2000 | Nickelodeon |
| Photo ID | 2009-2012 | FiOS1 |
| Pop-Up Video | 1996-2001 | VH1 |
| Pop-Up Quiz | 1999 | VH1 |
| Pop-Up Video UK | 1999-2001 | Channel 4 |
| TXT MSG | 2010 | MSG Network |
| UPN Alt Games | 1998 | UPN |
| Video IQ | 2004-2005 | Fuse |

=== Television specials ===
| Title | Year(s) | Network |
|---|---|---|
| NewsRadio: Our 50th Episode | 1998 | NBC |
| The Oprah Winfrey Show: Pop-Up Episodes | 1998 | Syndicated |
| Tad's Pad | 1998 | USA Network |
| Pop-Up Brady | 2001 | Nick At Night |
| Who Wants To Be A Millionaire: VH1's Pop-Up Celebrity Edition | 2000 | ABC |

=== Digital series ===
| Title | Year(s) | Website |
|---|---|---|
| Momtuition | 2012 | NickMom |
| Sesame Street Rewind | 2019 | Sesame Street |
| The Truth About | 2011, 2014-2015 | AOL, Playboy |
| The Truth About: Dailymotion Videostars | 2008 | Dailymotion |
| The Truth About: Uncharted | 2014 | Weather.com |
| This Month In Playboy History | 2014 -2015 | Playboy |
| TV Junkies | 2006-2007 | TiVo, Dailymotion, Joost, TV Without Pity |
| View With A Room | 2013 | Scripps Networks Interactive |

=== Motion picture and Television DVD Trivia Tracks ===
| Title | Year(s) | Studio |
|---|---|---|
| SpongeBob SquarePants Season 3 | 2005 | Viacom |
| The Truth About Showgirls | 2005 | MGM |
