= The Society of Orpheus and Bacchus =

Yale University a capella group

- Also known as: The SOBs
- Origin: Yale University, New Haven, CT
- Genres: A cappella, choral, barbershop music, comedy music
- Years active: 1938–present
- Members: Bacchus; Chris Tillen '27; Orpheus (Musical Director); Adriana Zhou '28 Marcello Funk '29 Tenor I Eunice Oh '26+1; Montana Dickerson '27; Katrin Marinova '27; Grace O'Grady '27+1; Mai Ishimura '29; Talia Roselaar '29; Cathy Hu '30; Daniel Shrestha '30 Tenor II; Felix Gong '26.5; Adriana Zhou '28; Silas Heaphy '29; Kazuki Sadamoto '30; Mel Zhao '30 Baritone; Charlie Patton '27; Chris Tillen '27; Justin Wang '27+1; Hari Viswanathan '28; Marcello Funk '29; Asher Rosenfeld '30; Albar Setiawan '30 Bass; Adam Bear '27; Huck Moore '28; Noah Lee '28; Henry Ng '29; Leo Tang '29; Konrad Tittel '30; Zeke Walker '30 Dante Thunderstorm '28
- Website: http://www.yalesobs.com

The Society of Orpheus and Bacchus, also known as the SOBs, is an a cappella singing group from Yale University. Founded in 1938, The Society of Orpheus and Bacchus is the longest continuously running underclassmen a cappella group in the United States. Alumni of the SOBs have gone on to be founding members of other college a cappella groups such as The Pitchforks of Duke University (Jeff Warren 1978) and The Chorallaries of MIT (David H. Bass 1975, also composer of their Engineer's Drinking Song).

== History ==
On October 31, 1938, twelve Yale undergraduates gathered at Mory's Temple Bar to form an alternative a cappella group to the Yale Whiffenpoofs. The group capitalized on a back-handed compliment received from an audience member: "These SOBs are good!" and formed a backronym.

== Music and comedy ==
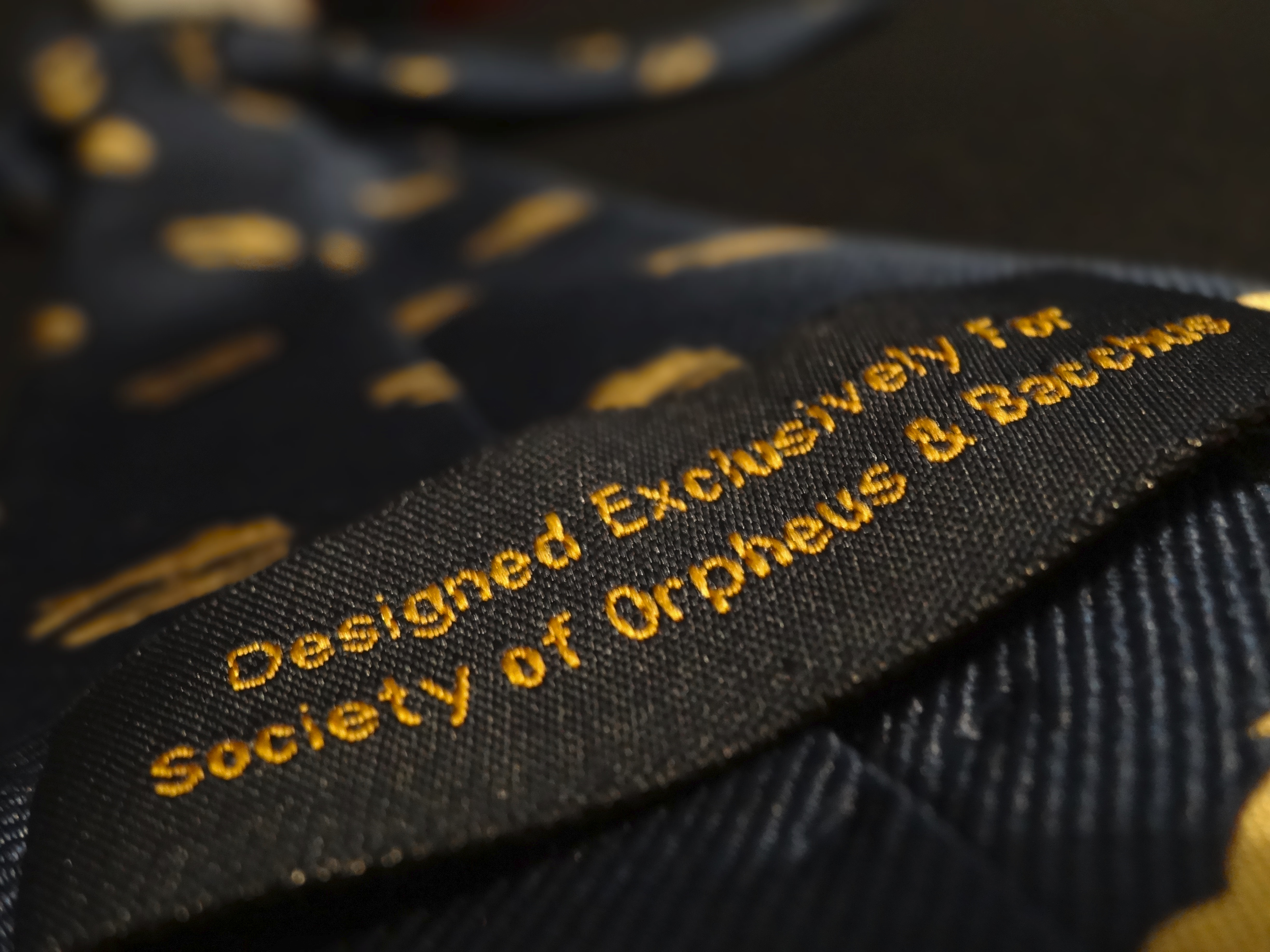
Custom necktie, reads "Designed Exclusively for the Society of Orpheus & Bacchus"

The society’s repertoire, which contains over 200 arrangements, is composed entirely of music arranged by current and former members of the group during its more than eight decades of existence. It spans a variety of genres from barbershop to jazz to songs by more contemporary artists like Queen, MIKA, Radiohead, Ariana Grande, Tenacious D, Olivia Rodrigo, Billie Eilish and Michael Bublé. In addition to singing, the group prides itself on its comedy, with a typical concert including shtick written by members of the group. Each year, the Society of Orpheus and Bacchus performs across the USA and around the world, typically wearing tuxedos or suits with custom group neckties. They have performed at the White House, the Korean Demilitarized Zone, La Fortaleza in Puerto Rico, the American Airlines Arena for the NBA team the Miami Heat, as well as at country clubs, yacht clubs, churches, schools and resorts. The SOBs are one of only three groups — along with the Whiffenpoofs and Whim 'n Rhythm — that have a weekly engagement at Mory's Temple Bar.

== Discography ==
The Society of Orpheus and Bacchus records a new album every other year. Since its founding, it has recorded and released 21 albums:

Album title	Year
Songs of the O's and B's	1948
The Lost Album	1954
Singing with The SOBs	1959
Pretty Girl	1961
A Toast to the Gods	1963
Stepping Out	1966
Grapes on Cover	1967
The Society of Orpheus and Bacchus	1969
Smile Away	1972
Greatest Hits	1976
An Evening with the Immortals	1978
Too Much is Just Enough	1981
Intemperance	1987
Drinking from Lethe	1992
Morning After of the Gods	1995
Wine in a Box	1998
Hot Damn!	2003
One for the Road	2006
Bandoleros	2008
The Continuing Adventures of Cyrus T. Elk and His Fantastical Flying Machine	2010
Some Pig!	2012
Now and For All Time	2015
A Mudnight Serenade	2016
Out of the Box	2017
Tracks for a Moving Train	2019
Odd Jobs	2022
Look Up!	2025

The album, Some Pig!, has been reviewed by the Recorded A Cappella Review Board.

== Notable alumni ==
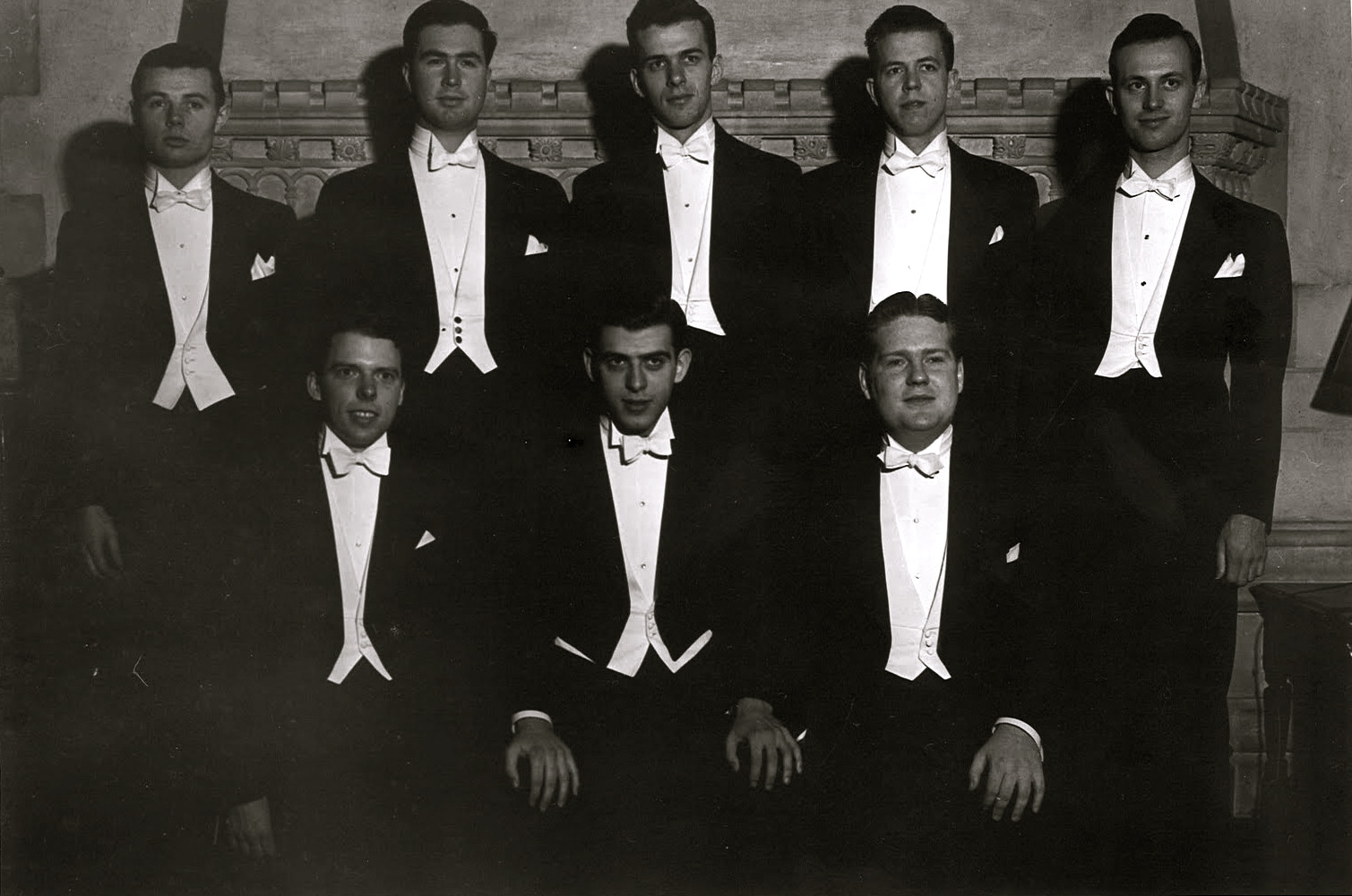
The first SOBs: back row: Comly, Dodge, Waldradt, LeBar, Springer; front row: Schuederberg, Levy, Lucey

- Hunter H. Comly 1941 - identifier of the cause of blue baby syndrome.
- Paul Lebaron Springer 1941 - a former intelligence officer, awarded by the Central Intelligence Agency (CIA) with the Intelligence Medal of Merit on retirement.
- Ralph Levy 1942 - an Emmy Award-winning American producer, film and television director.
- William Collins Jr. 1945 - a professor and Chief of Yale School of Medicine in 1967.
- Bradford Dillman 1948 - an American author and actor.
- David Chavchavadze 1950 - an American author and a former CIA officer.
- Horace Dwight Taft 1950 - Dean of Yale College
- Sam Weisman 1969 - an American film director and an executive producer of NBC's The Sing-Off.
- Robert Picardo 1975 - an American actor. He is best known for his portrayals of Dr. Dick Richards on ABC's China Beach, the Emergency Medical Hologram (EMH), also known as The Doctor, on UPN's Star Trek: Voyager, The Cowboy in Innerspace and Coach Cutlip on The Wonder Years (for which he received an Emmy nomination).
- Jonathan LaPook 1975 - American physician and medical journalist. He is the chief medical correspondent for CBS News.
- James L. Connaughton 1983 - an American energy industry lawyer and the former George W. Bush administration environmental adviser.
- Roy Jenkins 1984 - award-winning and twice Emmy-nominated comedy writer for Late Night with Conan O'Brien, alumnus of The Groundlings.
- Jeb Brown 1986 - Broadway performer, notable for his roles in Grease and Spider-Man: Turn Off the Dark.
- Mike Errico 1988 - American singer-songwriter, composer and producer.
- Tad Low 1988 - creator and producer of television shows, including Pop-Up Video and Pants-Off Dance-Off.
- Henry Blodget 1988 - editor and CEO of Business Insider.
- James Waterston 1992 - American actor and screenwriter.
- Franklin Raff 1996 - twice Emmy Award winning (Best Host, Best Documentary) host of GREAT WHITE SHIFT - Talk radio host.
- John Gidding 1999 - an American architect, television actor, former fashion model, one of the designers on the ABC Family show, Knock First, designer on Curb Appeal: The Block, and now appearing on the reboot of Trading Spaces.
- Chaim Bloom 2025 Incoming President of Baseball Operations St. Louis Cardinals.
- Brian Reed 2007 - NPR producer and creator of the award-winning podcast S-Town.
