= Tad Low =

American television producer

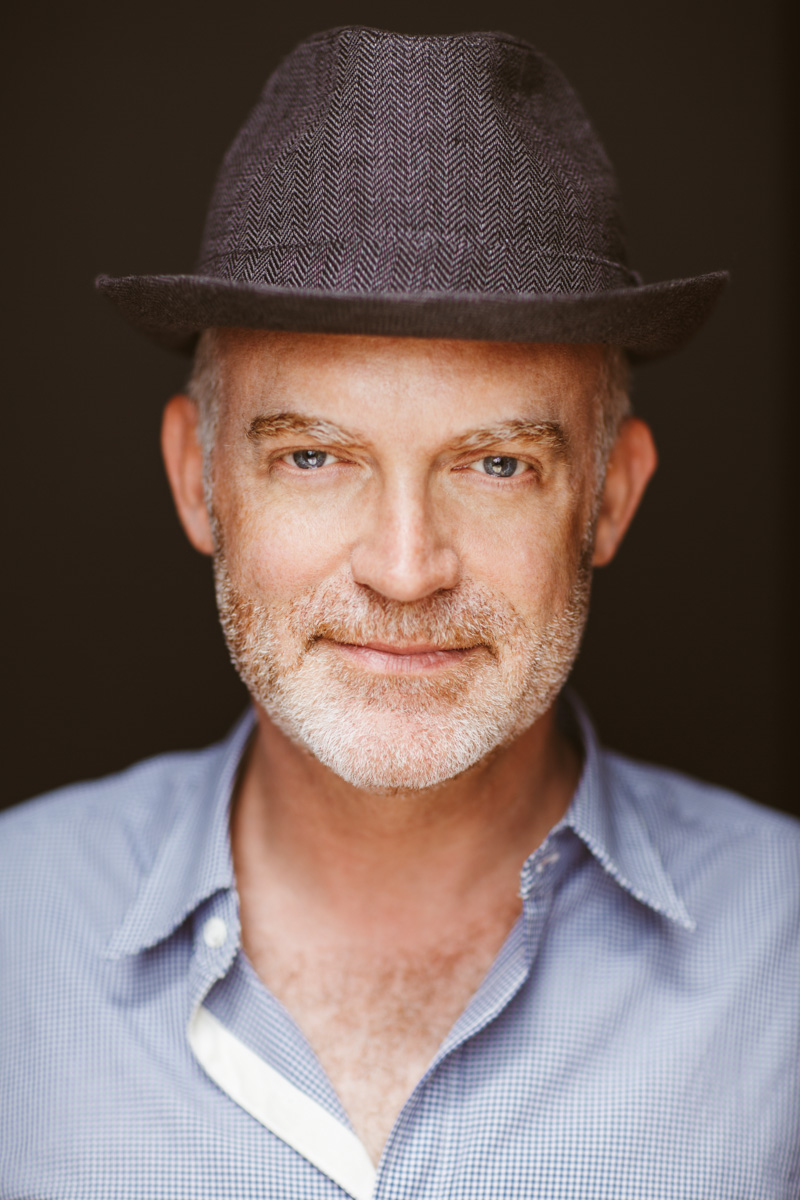
- Low in 2013
- Born: Josiah Orne Low IV; September 26, 1966 (age 59); Greenwich, Connecticut, U.S.
- Education: Greenwich High School
- Alma mater: Yale University
- Occupations: Television show creator; TV personality; producer
- Years active: 1989–present
- Children: 2
- Website: tadlow.com

Tad Low (born Josiah Orne Low IV on September 26, 1966) is an American businessman, media entrepreneur and nonprofit founder. He is the creator and producer of television shows, including Pop-Up Video and Pants-Off Dance-Off, and is the founder of SmarterPhone, a nonprofit organization established in 2023 that advocates delaying smartphone use among children and adolescents. He currently helms Spin The Bottle, a multimedia content company based in New York City. Low's work has been noted in the press for its ironic sensibility, and his shows simultaneously critique and celebrate popular culture in all of its banal and sublime incarnations. The paradoxical nature of Low's aesthetic was articulated by New York magazine when it dubbed Pants-Off Dance-Off both "brilliant and lowbrow".

== Personal history ==
A son of Penelope Ireland Low and Josiah Orne Low III, he was born and raised in Connecticut, a direct descendant of the Lows, once one of America's wealthiest families.

One of his antecedents, Seth Low, served as both the Mayor of New York and as president of Columbia University. Low is a graduate of Yale, where he was a member of The Society of Orpheus and Bacchus. He made his first television appearance with a rubber chicken on Marlo and the Magic Movie Machine in the sixth grade. In 1994, Low co-hosted the syndicated television show Last Call, produced by Brandon Tartikoff. Low has subsequently hosted and appeared on various television shows for MTV, VH1, CBS, NBC, and Fox. He has also contributed articles to Men's Health and The New York Times.

Since 1996, Pop-Up Video has been nominated for 13 Emmys, and in 2000 Low won a New York Emmy as host and producer of Subway Q&A, a show he co-created for Cablevision's Metro Channel.

Low lives in New York City with his wife, Alisa Lea Ruvinsky, a partner at PricewaterhouseCoopers, and their children. The couple exchanged vows at the Manhattan Marriage Bureau on June 6, 2013.

His creative work and memorabilia are housed in the Rock & Roll Hall of Fame Library and Archives.

=== SmarterPhone ===
In 2023, Low founded SmarterPhone, a nonprofit organization that advocates delaying smartphone use among children and adolescents through high school. The organization works with schools and parent communities, primarily in the New York City area, to promote coordinated approaches to technology boundaries and digital well-being. SmarterPhone has organized educational events featuring authors, psychologists, and other experts addressing adolescent development and social media use.

== Shows ==
Pop-Up Video first aired on VH1 in October 1996. It inserted bubbles containing trivia and snarky behind-the-scenes commentary into existing music videos. The show spawned numerous imitators and earned ten Emmy nominations. Low's inspiration for the show came from hearing a stylist friend's tales of mistreatment at the hands of a famous female pop star. As Low claims in an interview for a Canadian newspaper, "I'd be watching (this singer) being wonderful and fabulous in all these cheesy videos, while at the same time I was hearing one horrible story after another of the acts of human degradation committed by this woman." Low's fascination with this incongruity eventually culminated in the creation of "Pop-Up Video".

Video IQ debuted on the Fuse network in November 2004. One of the first interactive game shows, Video IQ gave viewers the chance to win prizes by deciphering and text-messaging the answers to rebus-style puzzles embedded in the images and lyrics of music videos. Video IQ was similar in temperament to the wry and biting Pop-Up Video. In one show, for example, the clue "Semi-retired blond pop tart" yielded the answer Britney Spears.

Subway Q&A. Low hosted and co-created this show on the Metro Channel along with Ronald Fried. Debuting in 2000, this show featured Low, along with a camera crew, coaxing subway commuters into disrupting their daily routines by, for example, holding an impromptu trial in a subway car in which riders were asked to be the jury, persuading subway passengers to try on a stranger's hat, and convincing a woman he had never met before to join him for a catered dinner on the subway platform in the middle of rush hour. Cajoling ordinary New York City subway commuters into exploring their inner performers, Subway Q&A reflected Low's desire, in the words of a New York Times reporter, to "elevate real people to celebrity". Low was awarded a New York Emmy as host and producer of Subway Q&A in 2000 and appeared on the cover of The New York Times Television Magazine.

Pants-Off Dance-Off. Low is the creator and executive producer of PODO, which debuted on the Fuse network on April 18, 2006. The highest-rated show in the Fuse network's history, PODO combines elements of a dance contest with a striptease. Each episode features five amateur contestants (aka "pancers") who disrobe while dancing in front of a screen playing their favorite music videos. The show also contains an interactive element, as home viewers have the opportunity to vote for contestants in categories such as "funniest", "most disturbing" and "best dancer" on the show's website. According to The New York Times television critic David Itzkoff, PODO not only helped garner media attention and public exposure for the Fuse network (no pun intended), but also promoted an ethos similar to the all-encompassing philosophy of Subway Q&A: "In contrast to the unattainable standards of perfections promoted by celebrity television, 'Pants-Off Dance-Off' is meant to be an inclusive experience, one that has already welcomed competitors as diverse as a 58-year-old retired schoolteacher and a woman in a unicorn mask."

Low's most recent television series include Pet-O-Rama (a skills competition for household pets), Best Places Ever I've Ever Been (a tour of travel experts' favorite unknown destinations), TXT MSG (a "Pop-Up Video"-style treatment of archival sports footage) and Photo ID (a look into the unusual lives of everyday people, through photos and anecdotes). The shows premiered in 2010 on Animal Planet, The Travel Channel, MSG Network and Verizon's FiOS.

== Filmography ==
=== Television ===
Year	Title	Role(s)	Network
1977	Marlo and the Magic Movie Machine	Featured Comedian	CBS/Syndicated
1991-1993	MTV News	Correspondent & Producer	MTV
1991-1993	The Week In Rock	Correspondent & Producer	MTV
1991-1993	House of Style	Correspondent & Producer	MTV
1994-1995	Last Call	Host	Syndicated
1995-1996	Good Morning America	Correspondent	ABC
1995-1996	Front Page	Correspondent	Fox
1996-2001	Pop-Up Video	Creator & Executive Producer	VH1
1996-1997	A Current Affair	Correspondent	Syndicated
1997-1998	USA Live	Correspondent	USA Network
1997-1998	Great Stuff	Anchor	CNBC
1997-1998	Channel 2 News	Commentator	WCBS-TV
1998	Phly	Creator & Executive Producer	WAMI
1998	1998 UPN Alt Games	Creator, Host & Executive Producer	UPN
1998-2001	Subway Q&A	Host & Producer	Metro Channel
1999	Pop-Up Quiz	Creator & Executive Producer	VH1
1999-2001	Pop-Up Video UK	Creator & Executive Producer	Channel 4
2000	Who Wants To Be A Millionaire: VH1's Pop-Up Celebrity Edition	Executive Producer	ABC
2004	40 Greatest Pranks	Commentator	VH1
2004-2005	Video IQ	Creator & Executive Producer	Fuse
2006-2007	Pants-Off Dance-Off	Creator & Executive Producer	Fuse, Viva, MuchMusic
2007	40 Greatest Internet Superstars	Commentator	VH1
2009-2012	Photo ID	Creator & Executive Producer	FiOS1
2010	Pet-O-Rama	Creator & Executive Producer	Animal Planet
2010	Best Places I've Ever Been	Executive Producer	Travel Channel

== Bibliography ==
- Pop This!: The Best Pops From The Creators of VH1's Pop-Up Video. Pocket Books. 1999. ISBN 0671027247. OCLC 41348501.
