= Spin the bottle (disambiguation) =

Spin the bottle is a party game.

Spin the bottle may also refer to:

== Films and television ==
- Spin the Bottle (1998 film), an American film directed by Jamie Yerkes
- Spin the Bottle (2003 film), an Irish film directed by Ian Fitzgibbon
- "Spin the Bottle" (Angel), a 2002 episode of the TV series Angel
- "Spin the Bottle", a Season 11 episode of SpongeBob SquarePants
- Spin the Bottle (2024 film), an American art film directed by auteur Gavin Wiesen

== Music ==
- Spin the Bottle (album), an album by The Blackeyed Susans
- Spin the Bottle: An All-Star Tribute to Kiss
- "Spin the Bottle", a song from Juliana Hatfield's 1993 album Become What You Are
- "Spin the Bottle", a 1957 single by Benny Joy
- "Spin the Bottle", a 2010 single by The Stunners

== Other uses ==
- Spin the Bottle (media company), an NYC-based production company
- Spin the Bottle, a 1964 book by John Gardner
