= Last Call (talk show) =

- Genre: Late-night talk show
- Starring: Sue Ellicott; Stuttering John Melendez; Tad Low; Elvis Mitchell; Terry McDonell; Brianne Leary
- Country of origin: United States
- Original language: English
- No. of seasons: 2

Original release
- Release: 1994 – 1995

Last Call is an American late-night talk show that aired in syndication from 1994 to 1995. Brandon Tartikoff was the show's executive producer.

== Format ==
Last Call was set in a loft that disguised the true time at which it was taped, allowing the late night viewer to assume they were watching a live broadcast. The show had four hosts that bantered with each other over different topics in the news, and featured topical guests and musical guests. Musical acts tended to be of the alternative music genre, such as the band Scarce.

== Hosts ==
The different hosts included Tad Low, critic Elvis Mitchell, magazine editor Terry McDonell, actress/writer Brianne Leary, and London Sunday Times correspondent Sue Ellicott. Howard Stern Show regular Stuttering John Melendez joined Last Call as a host in 1995.

== Reception ==
Entertainment Weekly's reviewer called it "a younger, hipper McLaughlin Group" with hosts who "giggle, gabble, and groan."

Variety said in its review, "At the end of the first segment panelist Sue Ellicott held out the “faint chance that we might get better.” There’s plenty of room."
