= Fair Game (radio program) =

Fair Game from PRI
- Genre: Humor, US News, Pop Culture, and International news including analysis, commentary, features, interviews, specials
- Running time: ca. 50 min.
- Country of origin: United States
- Language: English
- Syndicates: Public Radio International
- Hosted by: Faith Salie
- Created by: Kerrie Hillman and Public Radio International
- Executive producer: Kerrie Hillman
- Recording studio: New York Public Radio Studios, New York, NY
- Original release: 2007 – May 30, 2008
- Audio format: Stereophonic
- Website: (Defunct) www.morefairgame.org/

Fair Game from PRI with Faith Salie was a satirical news and entertainment program produced and distributed by PRI. Episodes aired weekday evenings on public radio stations and were made available online as podcasts.

The program was hosted by Faith Salie and featured interviews with celebrities and newsmakers, live music, and regular appearances by comedians. It often asked for listener feedback and contributions via its website. Regularly occurring segments included Why Do They Hate Us?, Seemingly Simple Solutions to Intractable Problems, and Bathed in Glory. Fair Game was intended to bring in a younger audience for public radio. According to PRI, the program was aired on about 25 public radio stations and received approximately 140,000 weekly listeners on average, as well as 100,000 monthly downloads of its podcasts.

The program was featured in The New York Times in June 2007.

Fair Game ceased broadcast for financial reasons on May 30, 2008, after 17 months on air.
