= Marlo and the Magic Movie Machine =

- Genre: Children's television series
- Created by: Charles Grinker, Mert Koplin and Sanford Fisher
- Starring: Laurie Faso
- Voices of: Mert Koplin (Machine)
- Country of origin: United States
- Original language: English

Production
- Executive producer: Sanford Fisher
- Producer: Charles Grinker
- Running time: 60 min. (1977); 30 min. (1978 - 1980)
- Production companies: Corporation for Education and Learning, Inc.

Original release
- Network: CBS (WFSB)
- Release: 1977 – 1980

Marlo and the Magic Movie Machine is a 1977-1980 children's television show originating from WFSB-TV in Hartford. The storyline involved Marlo Higgins (Laurie Faso) who is a mustachioed and frizzy-haired computer programming genius working for the L. Dullo computer company. He was banished to the "sub-sub-basement" by his boss, Leo Dullo. By day Marlo works for L. Dullo. At night he builds, programs, and interacts with his Magic Movie Machine (Mert Koplin, voice) built using L. Dullo hardware. The waveform from a real-time audio oscilloscope was displayed on the Magic Movie Machine's screen whenever it talked and it played short clips. The two (man and computer) traded tips and quips.

Marlo sat at a console with a slight resemblance to master control consoles of the time. He would call up the various film clips featured on the show by entering codes using a numeric keypad with round, yellow number buttons and pressing an orange rectangular Start button to start the selected film. In earlier episodes, a split-flap display mounted on the console showed the code entered on the keypad. In later episodes, this was changed to an LED display, and the buttons were made to sound like the DTMF tones made by a touch-tone telephone as Marlo pressed them. Most of the time, Marlo used a small keypad consisting of two columns of buttons flanking a CRT, located in front of him when he was sitting at the console of the Magic Movie Machine. However, a similar but larger keypad located on the wall was sometimes used (see below).

== Segments ==
Regularly featured segments, conceived and written by Producer/Story Editor Charles Grinker, included:

- The Pre-fame Game: Marlo always used the code '5060' to call up this film. Baby pictures of famous people would be shown and the audience would be given a chance to guess who the celebrity's identity before a more current picture was revealed.
- The Birthday Game: A date would be chosen, possibly from letters sent in by fans having that birthday. Marlo would enter this month and day on the keypad. A film featuring famous people who shared that birthday would be shown.
- What do you see from A to Z: The code for this feature was '456.' A letter of the alphabet would be chosen, and film clips of things beginning with that letter would be shown. The clip would begin shown completely covered up, and gradually uncovered until it is completely revealed after 10 seconds. Presumably, the audience would try to identify what is being shown as quickly as possible.
- What do you see from A to Z Hidden Word Game: The code was '5460.' Similar to above, except that each word would begin with a different letter, and after the picture is uncovered, its initial letter would be placed in a blank in a final word. At the end of the segment, the final word would be completely filled in.
- Magic Year, Magic Month, and Magic Day: Using a chosen date or year as the code and utilizing a special keypad added in a later season to enter months, Marlo and the machine would feature events in history occurring on a particular day (the same day in different years) or in a particular month or year.
- Knock-knock Jokes: Marlo would use the larger keypad to enter the code '0000' to call up this film. A character on-screen would begin by saying "knock-knock," Marlo would answer "Who's there?" and a knock-knock joke would be told.
- Riddles: In a later season, the knock-knock jokes were replaced by riddles, which Marlo would call up, again using the bigger keypad, by pressing '2222.'

== Production information ==
- Executive producer: Sanford Fisher
  - Producer and Story Editor: Charles Grinker
- Taped at: WFSB-TV in Hartford
- Aired from 1977 (60 minutes), 1978-1980 (30 minutes), Saturday afternoons
- Channel: CBS/Syndicated
- Production company: Corporation for Education and Learning (who leveraged their enormous archive of footage)
- Music: Score Productions, Inc.
