= Pants-Off Dance-Off =

Televised striptease dance contest

- Created by: Tad Low
- Country of origin: United States

Production
- Running time: 22 minutes
- Production company: Sharp Entertainment

Original release
- Network: Fuse TV
- Release: April 18, 2006 – 2007

Pants-Off Dance-Off (PODO) is a dance contest that premiered on April 18, 2006, on Fuse. It features stripteasers as they dance while disrobing.

== Format ==
In each episode, five contestants striptease to a music video, while interviews, soundbites and photos reveal stories about each so-called "pancer". For the first two seasons, the audience selected each episode’s winner by texting their vote. The third season used a format where judges selected the weekly winner. Each episode's winner received $200 and the opportunity to compete in a championship at the end of the season.

In October 2009 the show was launched in the UK on MTV's new channel Viva. The show had a completely new look, transmitted in double bill episodes and was also narrated by comedian Ross Lee. There is no cash prize on the UK version and there is no overall winner.

A Much Music version aired in Canada which involved the dancers stripping, often with the use of "mystery object", while an unseen narrator makes jokes.

== Hosts ==
The first season was hosted by Tila Tequila and Krista Ayne. Former child star Jodie Sweetin joined the show as host for Season 2. Willa Ford hosted Season 3.

== Production ==
The show's creator is Tad Low.
