= FiOS1 =

Hyperlocal news network

FiOS1 News
- Country: United States
- Broadcast area: New Jersey, Long Island, Lower Hudson Valley
- Affiliates: RNN

Programming
- Language: American English
- Picture format: 1080i (480i letterboxed for SDTV feed)

Ownership
- Owner: Verizon

History
- Launched: June 22, 2009; 17 years ago (Long Island and New Jersey); May 28, 2014; 12 years ago (Lower Hudson Valley)
- Closed: November 13, 2019; 6 years ago (10 years, 144 days)

FiOS1 was a news-based pay television network that was carried by Verizon Fios in the New York metropolitan area. Launched on June 22, 2009 in Long Island and New Jersey and later on May 28, 2014 in the Lower Hudson Valley, FiOS1 provided hyper-local news, weather, traffic, sports and also original programming. FiOS1 was only available in Northern New Jersey, Long Island, and Lower Hudson Valley.

The networks focused on content produced by RNN, which produced the network's newscasts. Sports coverage featured local high schools and colleges such as Rutgers University, Hofstra University and Princeton University.

In 2013, the segment Restaurant Hunter received a New York Emmy Award in the "Entertainment Feature/Segment".

In August 2019, it was announced that FiOS1 would shut down through a WARN Act notice after RNN and Verizon could not come to an agreement on a contract extension. It was announced in September that Optimum's News 12 would be added to the FiOS lineup beginning on November 4, 2019 as part of a wider deal to add their other news channels, Cheddar and i24 News. Although FiOS1 was intended to cease operations on November 15, 2019, near its closure, RNN announced via an email to its employees that FiOS1 would close early on November 13 (with its final newscast at 11 p.m.) as many of its employees were let go from their jobs. Immediately after its newscast, the websites and social network feeds were closed. Since 2021, all of FiOS1's websites became redirects to Verizon Fios' services.

From March 26, 2020, the former FiOS1 HD channel space (channel 501) was re-used for Verizon's "Pay it Forward Live", a weekly live program featured entertainment, mainly gaming and music, to support local businesses during the COVID-19 pandemic. This program concluded on May 28, and the channel was eventually removed from Fios altogether later that year.

== Programming ==
At the time of its closure, FiOS1 provided the following programs in all regions:

- FIOS1 News Morning Edition
- FIOS1 News Evening Edition
- FIOS1 News Weekend Edition
- FIOS1 News Daytime Edition
- FIOS1 News Now
- Push Pause
- Build
- Yahoo Finance Market Movers

FiOS1 provided additional local programming for its other three regions:

Long Island: High Speed Fiber-Optic Internet Services Provider | Verizon Fios:

- My Long Island TV
- Restaurant Hunter
- Heroes on our Island
- Money & Main$treet
- Traffic 360

New Jersey region:

- State of Affairs
- This is Jersey
- One on One
- Life and Living
- Caucus New Jersey
- New Jersey Means Business

The Caucus Educational Corporation once produced New Jersey Capital Report which was aired on FiOS 1 in New Jersey and ended its run in 2017

Lower Hudson Valley region:

- Newsbreakers
- Giants Access Blue
- FiOS1 News This Week
- Restaurant Hunter
- Fitness Friday
- FIOS1 News, Weather & Traffic

In addition, all FiOS1 regional channels aired local high school sports events in their respective regions weeknights from 7:30 p.m to 9:30 p.m.; most of these regional newscasts and high school sports events are pre-recorded. After FiOS1's closure, Restaurant Hunters and all of the high school sports broadcasts remained available on demand for FiOS customers. All of FiOS1's programs (with the exception of Verizon's Build, Yahoo Finance Market Movers, RNN's Richard French Live and programs made by the Caucus Educational Corporation) were canceled.

== Notable staff ==
=== All regions ===
- Geoff Bansen - Meteorologist, weekday mornings
- Brittany Borer - Meteorologist, weekday afternoons
- Joe Cioffi - Meteorologist, weekday evenings
- Jonathan Cubit - Meteorologist, weekend evenings
- Nicole Edenedo - Traffic Anchor / Entertainment Reporter, weekday mornings
- Larry Epstein - "Richard French Live" producer
- Brian Fitzgerald - Chief Meteorologist, weekday mornings
- Addison Green - Meteorologist, weekday afternoons (Now at KHOU11
- Christa Lauri - Host, "Money and Main $treet"
- Rob Petrone - "Restaurant Hunters" host
- Andrew Pineiro - Meteorologist, weekend mornings
- Shenise Ramirez - Web Editor, fios1news.com websites for all regions
- Joe Rao - Meteorologist, weekday evenings
- Lorin Richardson - Traffic Anchor, weekday mornings
- Christine Sloan - "Restaurant Hunters" host
- Trisha Nicolas - Reporter, Evenings
- Vineeth Thomas (Vineeth .T. Chacko/Thomas C. Vineeth) - Web Editor, fios1news.com websites for all regions
- Justin Walters - Sports Reporter (now at CBS Sports and WPIX)

=== New Jersey ===
- Brianne Talocka - Reporter
- Mary-Lyn Buckley - Reporter (now at the News 12 Networks)
- Nick Delgado - Reporter
- Nicole Edenedo - Morning Traffic Anchor / Entertainment Reporter
- Mike Gilliam - Anchor / Reporter
- Emily Girsch - Reporter
- Courtney Kane - Anchor
- Kristie Keleshian - Reporter
- Natalie Paterson - Reporter
- Christine Persichette - Morning Anchor

=== Long Island ===
- Cecilia Dowd - Reporter
- Nicole Edenedo - Morning Traffic Anchor / Entertainment Reporter
- Chelsea Irizarry - Reporter
- Courtney Kane - Nighttime Anchor
- Claire Kerr - Reporter
- Christa Lauri - Daytime Anchor
- Ron Lee - Reporter
- Kristin McNally - Reporter
- CJ Papa - Morning Anchor
- Ray Raimundi - Reporter
- Lorin Richardson - Morning Traffic Anchor / Reporter
- Archie Snowden - Reporter
- Vanessa Tyler - Nighttime Anchor
- Jackie Zabielski - Daytime Anchor
- Trisha Nicolas - Reporter

=== Lower Hudson Valley ===
- Nicole Edenedo - Morning Traffic Anchor / Entertainment Reporter
- Mike Gilliam - Nighttime Anchor
- Courtney Kane - Nighttime Anchor
- Christa Lauri - Daytime Anchor
- CJ Papa - Morning Anchor
- Lorin Richardson - Morning Traffic Anchor / Reporter
- Janine Ros - Weekend Morning Anchor
- Vanessa Tyler - Weekend Evening Anchor
- Jackie Zabielski - Daytime Anchor

== See also ==
- News 12 Networks
- Verizon Communications
- Verizon FiOS
