= Ken Rudin =

American radio journalist

- Born: New York City, New York, U.S.
- Education: Pace University

Ken Rudin is an American radio journalist.

== Early life and education ==
Rudin was born in the Bronx in New York City, where he attended P.S. 64, J.H.S. 82 and William Howard Taft High School. After high school, he moved to Fort Lee, New Jersey. He graduated from Pace University with a B.A. in political science.

== Career ==
During the 1960s, Rudin began collecting campaign buttons; he now has a collection of more than 70,000 campaign items.

Rudin spent eight years from 1983 to 1991 at ABC News, where he was the deputy political director and reportorial producer on Capitol Hill. He was also managing editor of The Hotline from 1994 to 1997.

He was the political editor for National Public Radio (NPR) and was involved with political news on a variety of NPR programs. Rudin also co-hosted a weekly podcast called It's All Politics, a segment called "The Political Junkie" on the NPR program Talk of the Nation, and wrote a column of the same name for npr.org.

After leaving NPR in 2013, Rudin began his own weekly program, Ken Rudin's Political Junkie.
