= Faith Salie =

American writer, journalist, actress and comedian

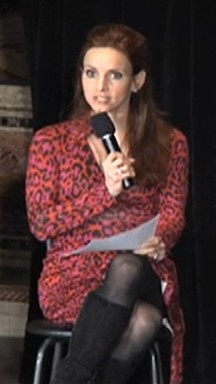
- Salie at the 2010 Boston Book Festival
- Born: April 14, 1971 (age 55); South Weymouth, Massachusetts, U.S.
- Education: Harvard University (BA); Magdalen College, Oxford (MPhil)
- Occupations: Actress; writer; radio host; television personality; television presenter
- Years active: 1994–present
- Spouses: Nick Holly (m. 2005; div. 2009) John Semel (m. 2011)
- Children: 2
- Website: Official website

Faith Coley Salie (born April 14, 1971) is an American journalist, writer, actress, comedian, television, radio, and podcast host. She is a contributor to CBS Sunday Morning and a panelist on NPR’s Wait Wait... Don't Tell Me!. She hosted Science Goes To The Movies on PBS and CUNY TV. She is a storyteller for The Moth, with her story viewed over 4 million times. Her first book, Approval Junkie, "a collection of daring, funny essays chronicling the author's adventures during her lifelong quest for approval," was published by Crown in April 2016. Salie adapted it into a solo show which she performed Off-Broadway at the Minetta Lane Theater in New York City in 2021. The play premiered at the Alliance Theatre in Atlanta in 2019.

== Early life and education ==
Salie was born in South Weymouth, Massachusetts, to Robert Salie and Gail Coley Salie. She grew up in Dunwoody, Georgia, with her two older brothers. Salie was raised Roman Catholic. Salie began dancing at age three and decided she wanted to be an actor after getting the lead in the fourth-grade class play. She began performing professional children's theatre at 13. In college, she performed in plays and musicals with Matt Damon, Mo Rocca and China Forbes.

Salie graduated in 1989 from North Springs High School in Fulton County, Georgia (now Sandy Springs, Georgia). She enrolled as an undergraduate at Northwestern University and transferred after one year to Harvard University. She graduated magna cum laude and Phi Beta Kappa from Harvard with a degree in history and literature of modern France and England. She won Harvard's prestigious literary award, the Bowdoin Prize, as well as the Jonathan Levy Award for best actor. Chosen for a Rhodes scholarship, she earned an M.Phil. in Modern English Literature from Magdalen College, Oxford.

== Professional career ==
Upon moving to Los Angeles from Oxford, Salie appeared in small roles on Sweet Valley High and Married... with Children before being cast on Star Trek: Deep Space Nine. She played the role of Sarina Douglas in two episodes, "Statistical Probabilities" (1997) and "Chrysalis" (1998). Salie, as Sarina Douglas, appears on a Deep Space Nine trading card.

Salie starred in the 2004 Bravo improvisational situation comedy Significant Others, as well as other television sitcoms and dramas, including Sex and the City and Unhappily Ever After, in which she played goth girl Caitlin Blackpool for a season. As a stand-up comedian and "pop-culture pundit," she appeared on several VH-1 shows including Best Week Ever, I Love the...90s, and Undateable.

In 2006, Salie moved to Manhattan to host the Public Radio International show Fair Game from PRI with Faith Salie. It was a daily satirical news and entertainment show and podcast. On Fair Game, Salie interviewed hundreds of newsmakers including Lorne Michaels, Jimmy Carter, Anthony Hopkins, Zach Galifianakis, Leonard Nimoy, and Chelsea Handler. She was a regular contributor to an ethics column for O, The Oprah Magazine. Salie has appeared as a guest on The Oprah Winfrey Show, The O'Reilly Factor, and Anderson.

Since Fair Game, Salie has hosted many podcasts, including Wait Wait Naked and Ashamed (about the 20th anniversary of Wait Wait…Don’t Tell Me!), Broadway Revival for Audible, Real Good for Stitcher, One Plus One for Wondery, and Authorized (about sex and romance in literature) for Audible. She has twice guest-hosted Wait Wait…Don’t Tell Me!

In February 2011, she hosted a Bravo special of Approval Matrix, a TV adaptation of New York magazine's feature by the same name.

From 2008 to 2010, she hosted Sundance Channel’s coverage of the Sundance Film Festival, where she interviewed actors and directors such as Jennifer Lawrence, Robert Redford, Ryan Gosling, Philip Seymour Hoffman, Chris Rock, Amy Poehler, Billy Bob Thornton, Joan Rivers, Michelle Williams, Dax Shepard, Elijah Wood, and Ashton Kutcher.

Salie has been a contributor to CBS News Sunday Morning since 2009. She regularly does stories and commentaries on the show, on topics ranging from time travel to gender pronouns to British vs. American English to the journey of a pointe shoe to the Nutcracker stage. She is a regular panelist on the NPR quiz show Wait Wait... Don't Tell Me!. She hosted the live, daily Sirius show News & Notes for the Entertainment Weekly channel in 2013. In 2012, Salie hosted the National Book Awards.

She has moderated events at venues such as the Paley Center for Media, Tribeca Film Festival, 92nd Street Y, the American Museum of Natural History, the New York Public Library, the World Science Festival and Comic-Con.

=== Approval Junkie and other writing ===
In Salie’s book Approval Junkie: My Heartfelt (and Occasionally Inappropriate) Quest to Please Just About Everyone, and Ultimately Myself, she shares stories of the lengths she’s gone to for validation, such as winning her high school pageant, choosing the dress to wear to her divorce, and undergoing a kind of exorcism to please her ex-husband, whom she calls her “wasband.” She adapted the book into a play with Amanda Watkins, who directed both the Alliance Theatre's Hertz Stage in Atlanta and the Off-Broadway runs.

Salie has also written for The New York Times, Time, USA Today, and McSweeney’s.

== Personal life ==
Salie is married to John Semel. They were married on October 9, 2011, in Rome. The couple have a son and a daughter. Salie has been very public about her fertility treatments and challenges and speaks often about becoming a mother for the first time in her 40s.

She lives in Manhattan with her family.

== Filmography ==
=== Film ===
- Running Woman (1998)
- Till Death Us Do Part (1998)
- The Trip (2002)
- Wild Things 2 (2004)

=== Television ===
- Oldest Living Confederate Widow Tells All (1994)
- Alien Avengers (1996)
- Married... with Children (1996)
- Star Trek: Deep Space Nine (1997–1998)
- Unhappily Ever After (1998–1999)
- Sabrina the Teenage Witch (1999)
- Charmed (2000)
- Sex and the City (2000)
- Black Scorpion (2001)
- Odyssey 5 (2002)
- Astro Boy (2003)
- Dragnet (2003)
- Miss Match (2004)
- Significant Others (2004) – main role
- Close to Home (2006)

== Awards ==
Salie has won five Daytime Emmy Awards as a Contributing Commentator to CBS News Sunday Morning with the show's wins for Outstanding Morning Program in 2013, 2015, 2019 and 2021.
