= Kyrie O'Connor =

American writer and editor (born 1954)

Kyrie O'Connor (born November 24, 1954) is a writer and editor.

== Biography ==
Born in Rochester, New York on November 24, 1954, she graduated cum laude from Wesleyan University in 1976. She is the sister of Candace O'Connor.

She worked for 14 years at the Hartford Courant, rising to the rank of assistant managing editor for features. O'Connor led the creation and/or redesign of many of that newspaper's feature sections. She left in 2003 for the Houston Chronicle, where she became deputy managing editor/features. At the Chronicle, she wrote a daily memo to her staff about trends in popular culture and discoveries she made about life in Houston, eventually turning the memo into MeMo, one of the Chronicle's first blogs. As of 2007, she remains deputy managing editor of that newspaper and a frequent panelist on the National Public Radio show Wait Wait... Don't Tell Me!.

O'Connor was named interim editor of the San Antonio Express-News on September 20, 2011, replacing Robert Rivard.
