= Sue Ellicott =

British political writer

- Citizenship: British
- Occupation(s): Television correspondent, political writer
- Known for: Wait Wait... Don't Tell Me!

Sue Ellicott is a former television correspondent for the BBC and political writer for The Times in Washington, D.C. Ellicott has appeared on CNN, ABC News, and Politically Incorrect.

Ellicott was one of the recurring guest panelists on the NPR radio news quiz show Wait Wait... Don't Tell Me!

Ellicott was briefly a co-host of Air America Radio's Morning Sedition with comedian Marc Maron and radio veteran Mark Riley.

She also appeared on Last Call with Elvis Mitchell, Stuttering John Melendez and Tad Low, a late-night talk show on CBS affiliates in the early 1990s that Entertainment Weekly called "a younger, hipper McLaughlin Group" with hosts who "giggle, gabble, and groan."
