= Charlie Pierce =

American sportswriter, blogger and pundit

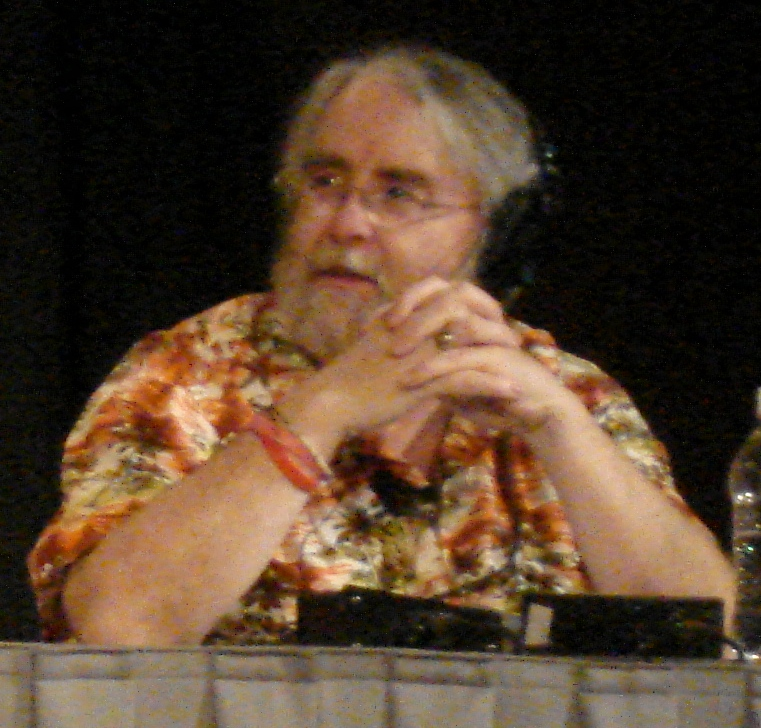
- Pierce during a 2009 taping of Wait Wait... Don't Tell Me!
- Born: Charles Patrick Pierce; December 28, 1953 (age 72); Worcester, Massachusetts, U.S.
- Education: Marquette University; Boston College
- Occupations: sportswriter, political blogger, liberal pundit, author, and game show panelist.
- Children: 3
- Writing career
- Years active: 1970s-present

Charles Patrick Pierce (born December 28, 1953) is an American sportswriter, political blogger, liberal pundit, author, and game show panelist.

== Biography ==
Pierce was born in Worcester, Massachusetts. He graduated from St. John's High School in Shrewsbury, Massachusetts, and from Marquette University in Journalism ('75). He attended graduate school at Boston College for two days.

Pierce's first job was as a forest ranger for the Commonwealth of Massachusetts. He wrote for Worcester Magazine in the 1970s, where he covered the Blizzard of 1978. In the 1980s and '90, he was a staff reporter for the Boston Phoenix and, later, a sports columnist for the Boston Herald.

Pierce is currently the lead political blogger for Esquire, a position he has held since September 2011. He also wrote for ESPN's Grantland. He has also written for The New York Times, the Los Angeles Times, the Chicago Tribune, the Boston Globe Sunday magazine, the Milwaukee Journal-Sentinel, Sports Illustrated, The National Sports Daily, GQ, and the e-zine Slate as well as the Media Matters blog Altercation, hosted by historian/pundit Eric Alterman.

Pierce makes appearances on radio as a regular contributor to NPR programs Only A Game and Wait Wait...Don't Tell Me!. Recently Pierce has begun making weekly appearances on the Stephanie Miller Show. He represented the Globe on several occasions on ESPN's Around the Horn and often co-hosts with Bob Ryan on NESN's Globe 10.0.

== Publications ==
Pierce has written four books:

- Sports Guy (2000) ISBN 978-0-306-81005-3
- Hard to Forget: An Alzheimer's Story (2000) ISBN 978-0679452911
- Moving the Chains: Tom Brady and the Pursuit of Everything (2006) ISBN 978-0374214449
- Idiot America: How Stupidity Became a Virtue in the Land of the Free (2009) ISBN 978-0767926140

== Awards ==
Pierce was a 1996 National Magazine Award finalist for his piece on Alzheimer's disease, "In the Country of My Disease." He was awarded third place in the Pro Basketball Writers Association Dan S. Blumenthal Memorial Writing Contest.
