= Adam Felber =

American political satirist, actor, author and radio personality

- Education: Tufts University (BA)
- Occupations: Political satirist; author; radio personality; actor; humorist; novelist; television writer; comic book writer

Adam Felber is an American political satirist, author, radio personality, actor, humorist, novelist, television writer, and comic book writer.

== Biography ==
Felber attended Tufts University in Medford, Massachusetts, and graduated as an English major in 1989. He has lived in Brooklyn, New York, and now lives in Los Angeles, California.

He is a regular panel member and occasional guest host of the NPR radio quiz show, Wait Wait... Don't Tell Me!. In July 2017, he began co-hosting the comedy podcast Live from the Poundstone Institute with comedian Paula Poundstone. In July 2018, he and Poundstone began co-hosting the podcast Nobody Listens to Paula Poundstone, a comedic advice show for which he is particularly renowned for the fact that he appears on every show.

Felber is the author of the novel Schrödinger's Ball, which uses as a conceit the concept of Schrödinger's cat. He has also written for several television shows including Real Time with Bill Maher, Talkshow with Spike Feresten, Arthur, The Smoking Gun, and Wishbone.

He also wrote the second Skrull Kill Krew limited series for Marvel Comics in 2009 as part of the Secret Invasion event.

In 2018 he was inducted into the Jericho High School Alumni Hall of Fame.

His mother is the late romance novelist Edith Layton and his sister is writer/comedian Susie Felber.
