= List of Wait Wait... Don't Tell Me! episodes (2015) =

The following is a list of episodes of Wait Wait... Don't Tell Me!, NPR's news panel game, that aired during 2015. All episodes, unless otherwise indicated, are hosted by Peter Sagal with announcer/scorekeeper Bill Kurtis, and were recorded at Chicago's Chase Auditorium. Job titles and backgrounds of the guests reflect their status at the time of their appearance.

== January ==
Date	Guest	Panelists	Notes
January 3	"Best of 2014" episode		
January 10	Former CIA officer Robert Baer	Amy Dickinson, Brian Babylon, Paula Poundstone	
January 17	Comedian Dame Edna Everage	Roxanne Roberts, Luke Burbank, Ophira Eisenberg	
January 24	Funk music legend George Clinton	P. J. O'Rourke, Faith Salie, Alonzo Bodden	
January 31	US Senator Jon Tester of Montana	Peter Grosz, Amy Dickinson, Tom Bodett	

== February ==
Date	Guest	Panelists	Notes
February 7	Fashion guru Simon Doonan	Maz Jobrani, Paula Poundstone, Reza Aslan	
February 14	Singer Lance Bass	P. J. O'Rourke, Roxanne Roberts, Tom Bodett	show recorded in Orlando, FL
February 21	"Best of" episode featuring actress Florence Henderson, actor Daniel Radcliffe, Travel Guru Rick Steves and musician Dale Watson		
February 28	Drummer Marky Ramone	Adam Felber, Ophira Eisenberg, Brian Babylon	

== March ==
Date	Guest	Panelists	Notes
March 7	Singer Robert Earl Keen	Kyrie O'Connor, Charlie Pierce, Faith Salie	
March 14	Musician Trombone Shorty	Amy Dickinson, Roy Blount, Jr., Paula Poundstone	show recorded in New Orleans, LA
March 21	Novelist Richard Price	Mo Rocca, Faith Salie, Gabe Liedman	
March 28	Writer/producer Matthew Weiner	Brian Babylon, Roxanne Roberts, Moshe Kasher	

== April ==
Date	Guest	Panelists	Notes
April 4	Actor Jeremy Piven	P. J. O'Rourke, Paula Poundstone, Adam Felber	guest host Mike Pesca
April 11	"Best of" episode featuring novelist Amy Tan, ballerina Misty Copeland, actor Rob Lowe, skier Mikaela Shiffrin and director Baz Luhrmann		
April 18	Boston Red Sox PA announcer and poet laureate Dick Flavin	Tom Bodett, Faith Salie, Maz Jobrani	show recorded in Boston, MA
April 25	Cartoonist and screenwriter Bruce Eric Kaplan	Amy Dickinson, Peter Grosz, Aparna Nancherla	

== May ==
Date	Guest	Panelists	Notes
May 2	Designer Jonathan Adler	Brian Babylon, Roxanne Roberts, P. J. O'Rourke	
May 9	Actor Steve Buscemi	Mike Birbiglia, Jessi Klein, Peter Grosz	show recorded in Brooklyn, NY
May 16	Motivational speaker Tony Robbins	Luke Burbank, Gabe Liedman, Paula Poundstone	
May 23	Singer Clay Aiken	Bobcat Goldthwait, Faith Salie, Adam Felber	show recorded in Durham, NC
May 30	Musician-themed "Best of" episode, featuring Max Weinberg, Toni Braxton, George Clinton, Trombone Shorty, and Marky Ramone		

== June ==
Date	Guest	Panelists	Notes
June 6	Film/TV producer Brian Grazer	Tom Bodett, Roxanne Roberts, Greg Proops	
June 13	Entrepreneur and reality TV personality Kim Kardashian	Maz Jobrani, Amy Dickinson, Peter Grosz	Guest host Mike Pesca
June 20	Actress and writer Mindy Kaling	Luke Burbank, Faith Salie, Charlie Pierce	
June 27	Astronaut Sunita Williams	Maz Jobrani, Paula Poundstone, Alonzo Bodden	Show recorded in Houston, TX

== July ==
Date	Guest	Panelists	Notes
July 4	Animal-themed "Best of" episode, featuring veterinarian Kevin Fitzgerald and San Diego Zoo animal ambassador Rick Schwartz		
July 11	NPR Fresh Air host Terry Gross	Peter Grosz, Amy Dickinson, Tom Bodett	Show recorded in Philadelphia, Pennsylvania
July 18	"Best of" episode featuring actress Florence Henderson, singer Alice Cooper, actress Shirley Jones, writer Elizabeth Gilbert, and comedian Dame Edna Everage		
July 25	U.S. Surgeon General Vivek Murthy	Roxanne Roberts, Adam Felber, Paula Poundstone	Show recorded at Wolf Trap in Vienna, VA

== August ==
Date	Guest	Panelists	Notes
August 1	Hip-hop artist Chance the Rapper	Brian Babylon, Faith Salie, Mo Rocca	Show recorded at the Jay Pritzker Pavilion in Chicago's Millennium Park
August 8	Starlee Kine, creator/host of the Mystery Show podcast	Maz Jobrani, Roxanne Roberts, Alonzo Bodden	
August 15	Singer Dwight Yoakam	Roy Blount, Jr., Paula Poundstone, Charlie Pierce	
August 22	"Best of" episode featuring former CIA officer Robert Baer, astronaut Sunita Williams, fashion guru Simon Doonan, and U.S. Energy Secretary Ernest Moniz		
August 29	Teen star-themed "Best of" episode, featuring actors Daniel Radcliffe, Brooke Shields, Rob Lowe, and Molly Ringwald, and singer Lance Bass		

== September ==
Date	Guest	Panelists	Notes
September 5	Edward Lee, former Top Chef contestant and owner/chef at Louisville's 610 Magnolia restaurant	Adam Felber, Amy Dickinson, Tom Bodett	Show recorded in Louisville, KY
September 12	Director and puppeteer Frank Oz	Faith Salie, Roxanne Roberts, Paula Poundstone	
September 19	Chicago Cubs owner Thomas S. Ricketts	Peter Grosz, Amy Dickinson, Adam Burke	
September 26	Singer/songwriter Jewel	Tom Bodett, Luke Burbank, Iliza Shlesinger	

== October ==
Date	Guest	Panelists	Notes
October 3	Sportswriter John Bacon	Alonzo Bodden, Roxanne Roberts, Roy Blount, Jr.	Show recorded in Ann Arbor, MI
October 10	Comedian Carol Burnett	Amy Dickinson, P. J. O'Rourke, Paula Poundstone	
October 17	"Best of" episode, featuring violinist Itzhak Pearlman and comedian Amy Schumer		
October 24	Astrophysicist Neil deGrasse Tyson	Adam Felber, Faith Salie, Maz Jobrani	
October 31	Journalist Jake Tapper	Luke Burbank, Roxanne Roberts, Tom Bodett	Show recorded in Des Moines, IA

== November ==
Date	Guest	Panelists	Notes
November 7	Supermodel Cindy Crawford	Amy Dickinson, Peter Grosz, Paula Poundstone	
November 14	Actress June Squibb	Brian Babylon, Maz Jobrani, Roxanne Roberts	
November 21	Theoretical physicist and Harvard University professor Lisa Randall	Alonzo Bodden, Faith Salie, P. J. O'Rourke	
November 28	Best of "Not My Job," featuring singer/songwriter Jewel, U.S. Surgeon General Vivek Murthy, actress/writer Mindy Kaling, novelist Richard Price, and Chicago Cubs owner Tom Ricketts		

== December ==
Date	Guest	Panelists	Notes
December 5	Actor Jeff Daniels	Adam Felber, Paula Poundstone, Maz Jobrani	Show recorded in Los Angeles, CA
December 12	French chef Jacques Pépin	Roy Blount, Jr., Luke Burbank, Neko Case	
December 19	Author Lee Child	Adam Burke, Roxanne Roberts, Tom Bodett	
December 26	"Best of 2015" episode, featuring musician Trombone Shorty, comedian Carol Burnett, and funk music legend George Clinton		
