= List of Wait Wait... Don't Tell Me! episodes (2023) =

The following is a list of episodes of Wait Wait... Don't Tell Me!, NPR's news panel game, that aired during 2023. All episodes, unless otherwise indicated, originate from the Studebaker Theatre at Chicago's Fine Arts Building. Dates indicated are the episodes' original Saturday air dates. Job titles and backgrounds of the guests reflect their status and positions at the time of their appearance.

Also unless otherwise indicated, each episode features Peter Sagal as host and Bill Kurtis as announcer/scorekeeper. Sagal announced on January 28 that he would step away from the show on parental leave (after the birth of his 5th child), but would return to the show the week of March 25.

== January ==
Date	Guest	Panelists
January 7	Previously unaired segments, including an interview with actress Mariska Hargitay; Encore segments including interviews with actor Sean Hayes, vermiculturist Myles Stubblefield, and comedian Mohammed Amer	
January 14	Author George Saunders	Emmy Blotnick, Peter Grosz, Paula Poundstone
January 21	U.S. Secretary of State Antony Blinken	Tom Bodett, Eugene Cordero, Dulcé Sloan
January 28	Actress Natasha Lyonne	Brian Babylon, Negin Farsad, Maz Jobrani

== February ==
Date	Guest	Panelists	Notes
February 4	Actor/singer Billy Porter	Adam Burke, Helen Hong, Zainab Johnson	Guest host Peter Grosz
February 11	Actress Geena Davis	Alonzo Bodden, Hari Kondabolu, Paula Poundstone	Guest host Tom Papa
February 18	Actress/dancer Rosie Perez	Cristela Alonzo, Negin Farsad, Josh Gondelman	Guest host Alzo Slade
February 25	Wait Wait 25th anniversary "best of" episode, featuring athletes Mikaela Shiffrin & Ozzie Smith, humorist John Hodgman, entertainers Stephen Colbert, Rob Reiner, & Leonard Nimoy, and astronaut Mae Jemison		

== March ==
Date	Guest	Panelists	Notes
March 4	Education activist Malala Yousafzai	Alonzo Bodden, Maeve Higgins, Mo Rocca	Guest host Josh Gondelman
March 11	Actor/comedian Nick Kroll	Amy Dickinson, Peter Grosz, Shane O'Neill	Guest host Negin Farsad
March 18	Actor Sam Waterston	Helen Hong, Tom Papa, Alzo Slade	Guest host Karen Chee
March 25	Political consultant David Axelrod	Jessi Klein, Hari Kondabolu, Paula Poundstone	Show recorded in Tucson, AZ (Centennial Hall)

== April ==
Date	Guest	Panelists	Notes
April 1	Actress Michelle Rodriguez	Luke Burbank, Zainab Johnson, Matt Rogers	
April 8	Wait Wait 25th anniversary "best of" episode part 2, featuring musicians Bonnie Raitt & Duke Fakir, comedian & current Wait Wait panelist Maz Jobrani, actor Ed Helms, and athlete Jackie Joyner-Kersee, as well as some favorite panelist moments.		
April 15	Beatboxer Kaila Mullady	Alonzo Bodden, Negin Farsad, Shane O'Neill	
April 22	Comedic musician "Weird Al" Yankovic	Tom Bodett, Josh Gondelman, Robby Hoffman	
April 29	Country musician Brad Paisley	Negin Farsad, Maeve Higgins, Faith Salie	Show recorded in Nashville, TN (Tennessee Performing Arts Center)

== May ==
Date	Guest	Panelists	Notes
May 6	Actor/comedian Ray Romano	Helen Hong, Tom Papa, Matt Rogers	
May 13	Actress/comedienne Gabrielle Dennis	Alonzo Bodden, Adam Felber, Paula Poundstone	Guest host Alzo Slade
May 20	Actress Golda Rosheuvel	Luke Burbank, Adam Burke, Negin Farsad	
May 27	Actor John Goodman	Mo Rocca, Maeve Higgins, Hari Kondabolu	Show recorded in New Orleans, LA (Saenger Theatre)

== June ==
Date	Guest	Panelists	Notes
June 3	Wait Wait 25th anniversary "best of" episode part 3, featuring actor/comedian & former Wait Wait panelist Keegan-Michael Key, actors Regina King & Colin Hanks, musician Bobby McFerrin, and author Susan Orlean.		
June 10	Vanity Fair editor-in-chief Radhika Jones	Emmy Blotnick, Skyler Higley, Tom Papa	
June 17	Actor James Marsden	Karen Chee, Adam Felber, Faith Salie	
June 24	Actress Karen Allen	Karen Chee, Roy Blount Jr., Negin Farsad	Show recorded in Lenox, MA (Tanglewood)

== July ==
Date	Guest	Panelists	Notes
July 1	Author/relationship coach Aleeza Ben Shalom	Brian Babylon, Adam Burke, Roxanne Roberts	
July 8	Wait Wait 25th anniversary "best of" episode part 4, featuring actors Mariska Hargitay & George Takei, TV host/author Martha Stewart, musician Vince Gill, and director Greta Gerwig		
July 15	Actress/singer Patti LuPone	Emmy Blotnick, Adam Felber, Joyelle Nicole Johnson	
July 22	Portland Trail Blazers point guard Damian Lillard	Luke Burbank, Paula Poundstone, Helen Hong	Show recorded in Portland, OR (Arlene Schnitzer Concert Hall)
July 29	Actor/comedian Randall Park	Tom Bodett, Josh Gondelman, Zainab Johnson	Guest host Karen Chee

== August ==
Date	Guest	Panelists	Notes
August 5	Poet/writer Maggie Smith	Shane O'Neill, Emmy Blotnick, Adam Burke	
August 12	Wait Wait 25th anniversary "best of" episode part 5, featuring actors Dax Shepard, Kristen Bell, & Mindy Kaling, writer/television personality Ina Garten, musician Donny Osmond, and rocket scientist Tiera Fletcher.		
August 19	Wait Wait 25th anniversary "best of" episode part 6, featuring musicians Brian May, Esperanza Spalding, & Cyndi Lauper, actor/comedians Bashir & Sultan Salahuddin, and ballet dancer Misty Copeland.		On demand replay was delayed or unavailable in some platforms due to music licensing issues
August 26	Musician Mark Ronson	Shantira Jackson, Luke Burbank, Alzo Slade	Guest host Negin Farsad

== September ==
Date	Guest	Panelists	Notes
September 2	Musician Bob Seger	Roy Blount Jr., Josh Gondelman, Helen Hong	Show recorded in Ann Arbor, MI (Hill Auditorium)
September 9	Marathoner/writer Martinus Evans	Amy Dickinson, Peter Grosz, Maeve Higgins	
September 16	Former U.S. Secretary of State Hillary Clinton	Josh Gondelman, Faith Salie, Dulcé Sloan	
September 23	Filmmaker John Wilson	Tom Bodett, Eugene Cordero, Joyelle Nicole Johnson	
September 30	Actor/writer Bob Odenkirk and his daughter, visual artist Erin Odenkirk	Karen Chee, Maz Jobrani, Jessi Klein	Show recorded in Los Angeles, CA (Greek Theatre)

== October ==
Date	Guest	Panelists	Notes
October 7	U.S. Solicitor General Elizabeth Prelogar	Roy Blount Jr., Shantira Jackson, Maz Jobrani	
October 14	Wait Wait 25th anniversary "best of" episode part 7, featuring previously unaired segments, including an interview with musician/composer Stewart Copeland. Also features encore segments with actors John Goodman & Sam Waterston, and actress/comedian Jenny Slate.		
October 21	Author James Patterson	Faith Salie, Matt Rogers, Alzo Slade	Show recorded in Hartford, CT (The Bushnell)
October 28	Bernie Taupin, lyricist for Elton John	Paula Poundstone, Alonzo Bodden, Zainab Johnson	Guest host Peter Grosz

== November ==
Date	Guest	Panelists	Notes
November 4	Ecologist and co-host of Wild Kingdom (2023 revival) Dr. Rae Wynn-Grant	Tom Papa, Maeve Higgins, Adam Burke	Guest scorekeeper Lakshmi Singh
November 11	Actor John Stamos	Tom Bodett, Emmy Blotnick, Skyler Higley	
November 18	CEO of L.L.Bean Stephen Smith	Hari Kondabolu, Maeve Higgins, Roy Blount Jr.	Show recorded in Portland, ME (Merrill Auditorium)
November 25	Wait Wait 25th anniversary "best of" episode part 8, featuring actress/comedian Jane Curtin, former chairman/CEO of Google Eric Schmidt, Olympic mogul skier Hannah Kearney, former host of Mythbusters Adam Savage, and former Notre Dame women's basketball coach Muffet McGraw.		

== December ==
Date	Guest	Panelists	Notes
December 2	Actress Dakota Johnson	Alonzo Bodden, Joyelle Nicole Johnson, Adam Felber	
December 9	Singer & frontman of The B-52's Fred Schneider	Eugene Cordero, Paula Poundstone, Luke Burbank	Guest host Negin Farsad
December 16	Television personality Bethenny Frankel	Josh Gondelman, Helen Hong, Alzo Slade	Show recorded in New York City, NY (Carnegie Hall)
December 23	Olympic long distance runner Molly Seidel	Shantira Jackson, Bobcat Goldthwait, Roxanne Roberts	
December 30	Wait Wait 25th anniversary "best of" episode part 9, featuring previously unaired segments, including an interview with 5th generation lobster fisherman Jacob Knowles; Encore segments including interviews with actresses Geena Davis & Karen Allen, and comedic musician "Weird Al" Yankovic		Some stations may altered the segments due to donation drive during the airing.
