= List of Wait Wait... Don't Tell Me! episodes (2018) =

The following is a list of episodes of Wait Wait... Don't Tell Me!, NPR's news panel game, that aired during 2018. All episodes, unless otherwise indicated, feature host Peter Sagal and announcer/scorekeeper Bill Kurtis, and originate at Chicago's Chase Auditorium. Dates indicated are the episodes' original Saturday air dates. Job titles and backgrounds of the guests reflect their status at the time of their appearance.

== January ==
Date	Guest	Panelists
January 6	Previously unaired features (including an interview with New York Times columnist Lindy West); Encore segments featuring former athletes Ryan Dempster and Jerry Rice	
January 13	Filmmaker Rian Johnson	Roy Blount, Jr., Adam Felber, Helen Hong
January 20	Morning TV personality Al Roker	Alonzo Bodden, Paula Poundstone, Mo Rocca
January 27	Actress and writer Krysten Ritter	Bim Adewunmi, Peter Grosz, Faith Salie

== February ==
Date	Guest	Panelists	Notes
February 3	Geneticist Michael Rosbash	Tom Bodett, Helen Hong, Paula Poundstone	
February 10	South Bend mayor Pete Buttigieg	Amy Dickinson, Adam Felber, Hari Kondabolu	Show recorded at Morris Performing Arts Center in South Bend, Indiana
February 17	Actor David Duchovny	Liz Miele, Mo Rocca, Faith Salie	
February 24	"Best of 'Not My Job,'" featuring filmmakers Jordan Peele, Greta Gerwig, & Lee Unkrich, producer Lee Daniels, and illustrator Liz Climo		

== March ==
Date	Guest	Panelists	Notes
March 3	Cross-country skier Jessie Diggins	Luke Burbank, Paula Poundstone, Roxanne Roberts	
March 10	Economist Austan Goolsbee	Alonzo Bodden, Tara Clancy, Faith Salie	
March 17	New England Patriots quarterback Tom Brady	Tom Bodett, Helen Hong, Mo Rocca	Show recorded at The Bushnell in Hartford, Connecticut
March 24	Actor LeVar Burton	Adam Burke, Amy Dickinson, Rashawn Scott	
March 31	"Best of" episode featuring author Daniel Handler, composer Michael Giacchino, U.S. Senator Ben Sasse, and sportscaster Joe Buck		

== April ==
Date	Guest	Panelists	Notes
April 7	Ohio Governor John Kasich	Roy Blount Jr., Peter Grosz, Roxanne Roberts	Show recorded at Palace Theatre in Columbus, Ohio
April 14	Actress Laurie Metcalf	Tom Bodett, Adam Burke, Faith Salie	
April 21	Actress Edie Falco	Helen Hong, Maz Jobrani, Mo Rocca	Featuring a tribute to former announcer/scorekeeper Carl Kassel, who died that week
April 28	Voice actor and comedian H. Jon Benjamin	Brian Babylon, Negin Farsad, Paula Poundstone	

== May ==
Date	Guest	Panelists	Notes
May 5	Britt Daniel, lead vocalist/guitarist of the band Spoon	Luke Burbank, Maz Jobrani, Faith Salie	Show recorded at Bass Concert Hall in Austin, Texas
May 12	Actress and neuroscientist Mayim Bialik	Alonzo Bodden, Helen Hong, Janelle James	
May 19	Singer Cyndi Lauper	Tom Bodett, Tara Clancy, Roxanne Roberts	
May 26	Actress and comedian Retta	Adam Felber, Hari Kondabolu, Paula Poundstone	Guest host Helen Hong

== June ==
Date	Guest	Panelists	Notes
June 2	Previously unaired kid-oriented segments (including a talk with actor Neil Patrick Harris); Encore segments with Colorado Governor John Hickenlooper, actress/comedian Aubrey Plaza, and former CIA advisor John Nixon		
June 9	New York Mets TV analyst and former Major League Baseball infielder Keith Hernandez	Bim Adewunmi, Luke Burbank, Peter Grosz	
June 16	Actor/comedian Louie Anderson	Roy Blount, Jr., Hari Kondabolu, Roxanne Roberts	
June 23	Freestyle skier David Wise	Alonzo Bodden, Faith Salie, Mo Rocca	Show recorded at Tanglewood in Lenox, Massachusetts
June 30	Aquanaut and conservationist Fabien Cousteau	Negin Farsad, Tom Papa, Paula Poundstone	

== July ==
Date	Guest	Panelists	Notes
July 7	"Best of 'Not My Job,'" featuring comedians Eddie Izzard and Keegan-Michael Key, singers Trisha Yearwood and Garth Brooks, and members of Blue Man Group		
July 14	Christine Lagarde, managing director of the International Monetary Fund	Adam Burke, Paula Poundstone, Faith Salie	
July 21	Former FBI director James Comey	Alonzo Bodden, Helen Hong, Mo Rocca	Show recorded at Wolf Trap in Vienna, Virginia
July 28	Musician Jon Batiste	Tom Bodett, Adam Felber, Rashawn Scott	Guest host Faith Salie

== August ==
Date	Guest	Panelists	Notes
August 4	Actress Uzo Aduba	Alonzo Bodden, Adam Burke, Roxanne Roberts	
August 11	Musician Jeff Tweedy	Amy Dickinson, Bobcat Goldthwait, Peter Grosz	Show recorded at the Jay Pritzker Pavilion in Chicago's Millennium Park
August 18	"Best of" episode featuring athletes Jessie Diggins and Bernie Parent, South Bend mayor Pete Buttigieg, geneticist Michael Rosbash, and TV personality Al Roker		
August 25	Animal-themed "Best of" episode, featuring veterinarian Kevin Fitzgerald and San Diego Zoo animal ambassador Rick Schwartz		

== September ==
Date	Guest	Panelists	Notes
September 1	Actress Glenn Close	Adam Felber, Paula Poundstone, Roxanne Roberts	Show recorded at Riverside Theater in Milwaukee, Wisconsin
September 8	Author Jenny Han	Adam Burke, Maeve Higgins, Helen Hong	
September 15	Actress Anna Kendrick	Paula Poundstone, Negin Farsad, P. J. O'Rourke	
September 22	Gymnast Aly Raisman	Adam Burke, Tara Clancy, Faith Salie	
September 29	Actor Jon Hamm	Alonzo Bodden, Maz Jobrani, Jessi Klein	Show recorded at Greek Theatre in Los Angeles, California

== October ==
Date	Guest	Panelists	Notes
October 6	Actress Ellie Kemper	Peter Grosz, Paula Poundstone, Roxanne Roberts	
October 13	"Best of" episode featuring astronaut Scott Kelly, economist Austan Goolsbee, actress Edie Falco, and Ohio Governor John Kasich		
October 20	Novelist John Grisham	Amy Dickinson, Hari Kondabolu, Mo Rocca	
October 27	Former NPR correspondent/anchor Robert Siegel; NPR legal affairs correspondent Nina Totenberg	Peter Grosz, Paula Poundstone, Roy Blount, Jr. (Who's Bill This Time?); Roxanne Roberts, Tom Bodett, Maz Jobrani (Panel Segment #1); Amy Dickinson, Mo Rocca, Faith Salie (Bluff the Listener); Adam Burke, Negin Farsad, Adam Felber (Panel Segment #2); Brian Babylon, Luke Burbank, Tara Clancy (Listener Limerick Challenge); Teams of all participating panelists (Lightning Fill-in-the-Blank)	Show recorded at Chicago Theatre; Wait Wait's 20th anniversary commemoration

== November ==
Date	Guest	Panelists	Notes
November 3	Writer Kevin Kwan	Adam Burke, Helen Hong, Faith Salie	
November 10	Singer Sarah Brightman	Luke Burbank, Paula Poundstone, Roxanne Roberts	
November 17	Orlando Magic forward Aaron Gordon	Tara Clancy, Adam Felber, Mo Rocca	Show recorded at Dr. Phillips Center in Orlando, Florida
November 24	"Best of 'Not My Job,'" featuring singer Cyndi Lauper, comedian Bassem Youssef, actors Mayim Bialik and Bradley Whitford, and freestyle skier David Wise		

== December ==
Date	Guest	Panelists	Notes
December 1	Film director Peter Farrelly	Bim Adewunmi, Brian Babylon, Tom Papa	
December 8	Actress Candice Bergen	Peter Grosz, Paula Poundstone, Faith Salie	Show recorded at Carnegie Hall in New York, NY
December 15	Actor William Shatner	Roy Blount, Jr., Luke Burbank, Helen Hong	
December 22	Mike D and Ad-Rock of the hip-hop group Beastie Boys	Adam Felber, Maeve Higgins, Roxanne Roberts	
December 29	Previously unaired segments, including an interview with late night host Seth Meyers; Encore segments featuring actors Jon Hamm and Glenn Close, actor/comedian Louie Anderson, and musician Jeff Tweedy		
