= List of Wait Wait... Don't Tell Me! episodes (2011) =

The following is a list of episodes of Wait Wait... Don't Tell Me!, NPR's news panel game, during 2011. Job titles reflect the position of individuals at the time of the appearance. All shows, unless otherwise indicated, are hosted by Peter Sagal with announcer/scorekeeper Carl Kassell and are taped at Chicago's Chase Auditorium.

== January ==
Date	Guest	Panelists	Notes
January 1	Writer/director Nora Ephron	Mo Rocca, Roy Blount Jr., Paula Poundstone	Media-themed episode Show recorded at Carnegie Hall in New York, NY
January 8	Fox Sports analyst and former NFL defensive tackle Tony Siragusa	Tom Bodett, Paula Poundstone, Charlie Pierce	Guest host Peter Grosz
January 15	Music executive Russell Simmons	Maz Jobrani, Amy Dickinson, Mo Rocca	Guest announcer/scorekeeper Korva Coleman
January 22	Musician Lucinda Williams	Tom Bodett, Roxanne Roberts, Luke Burbank	
January 29	Former baseball great Cal Ripken Jr.	Faith Salie, Kyrie O'Connor, Brian Babylon	

== February ==
Date	Guest	Panelists	Notes
February 5	Novelist Carl Hiaasen	Mo Rocca, Roxanne Roberts, Alonzo Bodden	
February 12	Sports-themed "Best of" episode, featuring Pete Carroll, Joey Harrington, Buster Olney, Kelly Slater, and Monica Seles		
February 19	Actor John Leguizamo	Luke Burbank, Roxanne Roberts, Charlie Pierce	
February 26	Actor Jesse Eisenberg	Paula Poundstone, Adam Felber, Roy Blount Jr.	

== March ==
Date	Guest	Panelists	Notes
March 5	Actress Lisa Kudrow	Brian Babylon, Roxanne Roberts, Roy Blount Jr.	
March 12	Comedian Pee-Wee Herman	Tom Bodett, Faith Salie, Mo Rocca	
March 19	Singer/songwriter Judy Collins	Maz Jobrani, Amy Dickinson, Paula Poundstone	
March 26	Talk show host Jerry Springer	Charlie Pierce, Kyrie O'Connor, P. J. O'Rourke	Show recorded in Waterbury, CT

== April ==
Date	Guest	Panelists	Notes
April 2	Humorist and writer Dave Barry	Peter Grosz, Kyrie O'Connor, Tom Bodett	Health-themed episode Show recorded in Miami, FL
April 9	Comedian Jessi Klein	Tom Bodett, Roxanne Roberts, Peter Grosz	
April 16	Writer/producer David Simon	Charlie Pierce, Kyrie O'Connor, Luke Burbank	
April 23	Filmmaker John Waters	Adam Felber, Amy Dickinson, Mo Rocca	Show recorded in Baltimore, MD
April 30	Stuntman Hal Needham	Faith Salie, Paula Poundstone, Roy Blount Jr.	

== May ==
Date	Guest	Panelists	Notes
May 7	Comedian Demetri Martin	Brian Babylon, Amy Dickinson, Mo Rocca	
May 14	Rebroadcast of technology-themed 4/4/2009 episode featuring journalist and food writer Michael Pollan		
May 21	US presidential candidate and former New Mexico Governor Gary Johnson	Charlie Pierce, Roxanne Roberts, Paula Poundstone	
May 28	Chef Bob Waggoner	Tom Bodett, Faith Salie, Adam Felber	Show recorded in Charleston, SC

== June ==
Date	Guest	Panelists	Notes
June 4	Actor Kevin Bacon	Alonzo Bodden, Amy Dickinson, Paula Poundstone	
June 11	Drag artist RuPaul	Charlie Pierce, Roxanne Roberts, P. J. O'Rourke	
June 18	Actor Simon Pegg	Faith Salie, Luke Burbank, Mo Rocca	
June 25	Former US President Bill Clinton	Maz Jobrani, Tom Bodett, Jessi Klein	

== July ==
Date	Guest	Panelists	Notes
July 2	Singer Vince Gill	Adam Felber, Kyrie O'Connor, Roy Blount Jr.	Show recorded in Nashville, TN
July 9	Musician-themed "Best of" episode, featuring Neko Case, The Village People, Wayne Newton, Bettye LaVette, and Elvis Costello		
July 16	Twitter co-founder Biz Stone	Faith Salie, Peter Grosz, Paula Poundstone	Show recorded in San Francisco, CA
July 23	Talk show personality Larry King	Brian Babylon, Roxanne Roberts, Tom Bodett	
July 30	Singer/songwriter Rosanne Cash	Luke Burbank, Kyrie O'Connor, Roy Blount Jr.	

== August ==
Date	Guest	Panelists	Notes
August 6	Actor Jason Bateman	Charlie Pierce, Mo Rocca, Amy Dickinson	
August 13	Fishing boat captain and Deadliest Catch personality Andy Hillstrand	Adam Felber, Paula Poundstone, Tom Bodett	Show recorded in Fairbanks, AK
August 20	"Best of" episode featuring Kevin Bacon, Lisa Kudrow, Pee-wee Herman, Lucy Lawless, and John Leguizamo		
August 27	Listener-selected "Best of" episode featuring actor Dick Van Dyke and former US President Bill Clinton		

== September ==
Date	Guest	Panelists	Notes
September 3	Economist Austan Goolsbee	Alonzo Bodden, Amy Dickinson, Adam Felber	
September 10	Actor Henry Winkler	Paula Poundstone, Charlie Pierce, Kyrie O'Connor	
September 17	Musician Colin Meloy of The Decemberists	Peter Grosz, Roxanne Roberts, Roy Blount Jr.	Show recorded in Portland, OR
September 24	Primatologist Jane Goodall	Jessi Klein, Brian Babylon, Paula Poundstone	

== October ==
Date	Guest	Panelists	Notes
October 1	Fashion blogger Tavi Gevinson	Faith Salie, Maz Jobrani, Tom Bodett	
October 8	Astrophysicist Adam Riess	Luke Burbank, Paula Poundstone, P. J. O'Rourke	
October 15	Comedian Patton Oswalt	Mo Rocca, Charlie Pierce, Amy Dickinson	Guest announcer/scorekeeper Korva Coleman
October 22	Rebroadcast of media-themed 1/1/2011 episode featuring writer/director Nora Ephron		
October 29	Actor Alan Alda	Tom Bodett, Roxanne Roberts, Brian Babylon	Show recorded in Indianapolis, IN

== November ==
Date	Guest	Panelists	Notes
November 5	Actor Colin Hanks	Kyrie O'Connor, Peter Grosz, Paula Poundstone	
November 12	Writer/producer and voice actor Seth MacFarlane	Tom Bodett, Amy Dickinson, Charlie Pierce	
November 19	Comedian Marc Maron	Adam Felber, Faith Salie, Roy Blount Jr.	Show recorded in Tampa, FL
November 26	"Best of" episode featuring actor Henry Winkler, primatologist Jane Goodall, actor Jason Bateman, fashion blogger Tavi Gevinson, and singer/songwriter Rosanne Cash		

== December ==
Date	Guest	Panelists	Notes
December 3	Writer Susan Orlean	Mo Rocca, Roxanne Roberts, Luke Burbank	
December 10	Thoroughbred jockey Chris McCarron	Peter Grosz, Kyrie O'Connor, Charlie Pierce	Show recorded in Richmond, KY
December 17	Comedian Bill Maher	Maz Jobrani, Jessi Klein, Paula Poundstone	
December 23 (Television); December 24 (Radio)	Author Neil Gaiman	Alonzo Bodden, Paula Poundstone, Nick Hancock	TV Title:"A Royal Pain in the News" Episode theme: "News of 2011 in review" This show was the first and only show broadcast on television as well as radio.
December 31	Rebroadcast of health-themed 4/2/2011 episode featuring humorist and writer Dave Barry		
