= List of Wait Wait... Don't Tell Me! episodes (2019) =

The following is a list of episodes of Wait Wait... Don't Tell Me!, NPR's news panel game, that aired during 2019. All episodes, unless otherwise indicated, feature host Peter Sagal and announcer/scorekeeper Bill Kurtis, and originate at Chicago's Chase Auditorium. Dates indicated are the episodes' original Saturday air dates. Job titles and backgrounds of the guests reflect their status at the time of their appearance.

== January ==
Date	Guest	Panelists	Notes
January 5	"Best of 2018" episode, featuring segments with actors LeVar Burton and Uzo Aduba		
January 12	Houston Rockets head coach Mike D'Antoni	Luke Burbank, Paula Poundstone, Roxanne Roberts	Guest announcer/scorekeeper Chioke I’Anson
January 19	Late night TV host Conan O'Brien	Alonzo Bodden, Helen Hong, Mo Rocca	
January 26	Former pro football defensive back Charles Tillman	Bim Adewunmi, Adam Burke, Amy Dickinson	

== February ==
Date	Guest	Panelists	Notes
February 2	Actor Richard E. Grant	Tom Bodett, Adam Felber, Maeve Higgins	
February 9	Georgia politician Stacey Abrams	Peter Grosz, Roxanne Roberts, Mo Rocca	Show recorded at Johnny Mercer Theatre in Savannah, GA
February 16	Actor Matt Smith	Maeve Higgins, Alonzo Bodden, Luke Burbank	
February 23	"Best of" episode featuring South Bend mayor Pete Buttigieg, singer Sarah Brightman, author John Grisham, and NPR veterans Nina Totenberg & Robert Siegel		

== March ==
Date	Guest	Panelists	Notes
March 2	Writer/producer Aaron Sorkin	Tom Bodett, Paula Poundstone, Faith Salie	
March 9	Costume designer Ruth E. Carter	Adam Felber, Peter Grosz, Roxanne Roberts	
March 16	Skateboarder Tony Hawk	Luke Burbank, Helen Hong, Jessi Klein	Show recorded at Civic Theatre in San Diego, CA
March 23	Actress Aidy Bryant	Adam Burke, Negin Farsad, Mo Rocca	Guest announcer/scorekeeper Chioke I’Anson
March 30	Actor/singer Andrew Rannells	Paula Poundstone, Brian Babylon, Hari Kondabolu	

== April ==
Date	Guest	Panelists	Notes
April 6	Musician Steve Earle	Tom Bodett, Peter Grosz, Roxanne Roberts	
April 13	Journalist Dan Rather	Alonzo Bodden, Negin Farsad, Maeve Higgins	Show recorded at Laurie Auditorium in San Antonio, TX
April 20	Previously unaired segments Encore segments featuring actors William Shatner and Candice Bergen, late night host Conan O'Brien, and basketball star Aaron Gordon		
April 27	Surfer Laird Hamilton	Luke Burbank, Bobcat Goldthwait, Paula Poundstone	

== May ==
Date	Guest	Panelists	Notes
May 4	Los Angeles Clippers owner Steve Ballmer	Petey DeAbreu, Peter Grosz, Roxanne Roberts	
May 11	Baseball Hall of Fame shortstop Ozzie Smith	Brian Babylon, Tom Bodett, Amy Dickinson	Show recorded at Fox Theatre in St Louis, MO
May 18	Actor Lance Reddick	Roy Blount, Jr., Adam Felber, Helen Hong	
May 25	Actress Kate Mulgrew	Alonzo Bodden, Tom Papa, Faith Salie	

== June ==
Date	Guest	Panelists	Notes
June 1	Hero-themed "Best Of" episode, featuring costume designer Ruth E. Carter, former NFL star Charles Tillman, actress Aidy Bryant, writer/producer Aaron Sorkin, and politician Stacey Abrams		
June 8	Actress/director Olivia Wilde	Adam Burke, Maz Jobrani, Aida Rodriguez	
June 15	Former U.S. Women's soccer team member Kristine Lilly	Roy Blount, Jr., Jordan Carlos, Helen Hong	
June 22	Former White House senior advisor Valerie Jarrett	Adam Felber, Peter Grosz, Roxanne Roberts	
June 29	Author Jennifer Weiner	Luke Burbank, Paula Poundstone, Faith Salie	Show recorded at Mann Center in Philadelphia, Pennsylvania

== July ==
Date	Guest	Panelists	Notes
July 6	Previously unaired panel and game segments "Not My Job" encores featuring IMF managing director Christine Lagarde, journalist Dan Rather, and late night TV host Seth Meyers		
July 13	Aeronautical engineer Tiera Guinn Fletcher	Jordan Carlos, Paula Poundstone, Roxanne Roberts	
July 20	Writer Piper Kerman	Alonzo Bodden, Maeve Higgins, Mo Rocca	Show recorded at Blossom Music Center in Cuyahoga Falls, OH
July 27	Marin Alsop, principal conductor of the Baltimore Symphony Orchestra	Petey DeAbreu, Adam Felber, Faith Salie	

== August ==
Date	Guest	Panelists	Notes
August 3	Actor Anthony Anderson	Adam Burke, Paula Poundstone, Aida Rodriguez	
August 10	Actor Henry Winkler	Alonzo Bodden, Helen Hong, Hari Kondabolu	
August 17	"Best of" episode featuring Hall of Fame athletes Ozzie Smith and Jerry Rice, actress Anna Kendrick, and basketball coach Mike D'Antoni		
August 24	"Best of" episode featuring explorer Fabien Cousteau, writer Lindy West, hip-hop group Beastie Boys, and actors Retta and Matt Smith		
August 31	Chef José Andrés	Negin Farsad, Peter Grosz, Faith Salie	Show recorded at Wolf Trap in Vienna, VA

== September ==
Date	Guest	Panelists	Notes
September 7	Vocalist Mary Wilson	Bim Adewunmi, Amy Dickinson, Paula Poundstone	Guest host Tom Papa
September 14	New York Liberty center Tina Charles	Adam Felber, Peter Grosz, Helen Hong	Show recorded at NJPAC in Newark, NJ
September 21	Comedian/actor Zach Galifianakis	Alonzo Bodden, Bobcat Goldthwait, Roxanne Roberts	
September 28	Actor Charlie Day	Roy Blount, Jr., Adam Burke, Negin Farsad	

== October ==
Date	Guest	Panelists	Notes
October 5	Former motorsports star Danica Patrick	Tom Bodett, Helen Hong, Faith Salie	
October 12	Actress Regina King	Shannon O'Neill, Paula Poundstone, Mo Rocca	Guest announcer/scorekeeper Chioke I’Anson
October 19	Previously unheard segments, including an interview with opera soprano Renée Fleming; Encore segments, including interviews with actress Kate Mulgrew and aeronautical engineer Tiera Fletcher		
October 26	Ecologist Nalini Nadkarni	Roy Blount, Jr., Peter Grosz, Roxanne Roberts	Show recorded at Eccles Theater in Salt Lake City, UT; Wait Wait's 1,000th original episode

== November ==
Date	Guest	Panelists	Notes
November 2	Author and activist Gloria Steinem	Negin Farsad, Josh Gondelman, P. J. O'Rourke	
November 9	Actor Leslie Odom, Jr.	Jordan Carlos, Adam Felber, Faith Salie	
November 16	U.S. Senator Tim Kaine of Virginia	Tom Bodett, Luke Burbank, Maeve Higgins	Show recorded at Altria Theater in Richmond, VA
November 23	Fashion journalist Elaine Welteroth	Joel Kim Booster, Paula Poundstone, Roxanne Roberts	
November 30	Previously unheard segments, including an interview with singer/actor Alex Boyé; Encore segments featuring actors Olivia Wilde & Henry Winkler and writer Piper Kerman		

== December ==
Date	Guest	Panelists
December 7	Comedian/actor Ali Wong	Alonzo Bodden, Adam Felber, Aida Rodriguez
December 14	Washington Nationals pitcher Sean Doolittle	Peter Grosz, Paula Poundstone, Faith Salie
December 21	Jennifer Lee, filmmaker and CCO of Walt Disney Animation Studios	Adam Burke, Roxanne Roberts, Mo Rocca
December 28	"Best of 2019" episode featuring chef José Andrés, symphony conductor Marin Alsop, musician Steve Earle, author Jennifer Weiner, and actor Anthony Anderson	
