= List of Wait Wait... Don't Tell Me! episodes (2020) =

The following is a list of episodes of Wait Wait... Don't Tell Me!, NPR's news panel game, that aired during 2020. All episodes, unless otherwise indicated, feature host Peter Sagal and announcer/scorekeeper Bill Kurtis. Dates indicated are the episodes' original Saturday air dates. Job titles and backgrounds of the guests reflect their status at the time of their appearance.

Through the week of March 7, unless also otherwise indicated, Wait Wait episodes originated from Chicago's Chase Auditorium. As a social distancing precaution during the COVID-19 pandemic, episodes after March 14 were produced without live audiences, and from March 21 onward were produced through the facilities of Wait Wait co-producer WBEZ (participants joined the show through remote links).

== January ==
Date	Guest	Panelists	Notes
January 4	Special episode of Wait, Wait highlights from the 2010s decade		
January 11	Journalist Ronan Farrow	Luke Burbank, Adam Burke, Roxanne Roberts	
January 18	Culinary writer Alison Roman	Tom Bodett, Maeve Higgins, Helen Hong	
January 25	Olivia Nuzzi, Washington correspondent for New York magazine	Negin Farsad, Paula Poundstone, Mo Rocca	Show recorded in Des Moines, IA (Des Moines Civic Center)

== February ==
Date	Guest	Panelists
February 1	Actress & filmmaker Isabella Rossellini	Josh Gondelman, Maz Jobrani, Faith Salie
February 8	Actor & playwright Tracy Letts	Amy Dickinson, Peter Grosz, Hari Kondabolu
February 15	Film/TV director Barry Sonnenfeld	Alonzo Bodden, Helen Hong, Tom Papa
February 22	"Best of" episode featuring baseball pitcher Sean Doolittle, ecologist Nalini Nadkarni, U.S. Senator Tim Kaine, and author/activist Gloria Steinem	
February 29	Actor Will Arnett	Joel Kim Booster, Luke Burbank, Roxanne Roberts

== March ==
Date	Guest	Panelists	Notes
March 7	TV personality Karamo Brown	Demi Adejuyigbe, Mo Rocca, Faith Salie	
March 14	Rap artist Big Boi	Tom Bodett, Peter Grosz, Helen Hong	Show recorded in Atlanta, GA (Fox Theatre)
March 21	Late-night TV personality Stephen Colbert	Luke Burbank, Maz Jobrani, Paula Poundstone	
March 28	Fashion expert Tim Gunn	Peter Grosz, Adam Burke, Negin Farsad	

== April ==
Date	Guest	Panelists
April 4	Comedian/actor Kumail Nanjiani & writer Emily V. Gordon	Alonzo Bodden, Roxanne Roberts, Mo Rocca
April 11	Chef and food writer Samin Nosrat	Tom Bodett, Josh Gondelman, Helen Hong
April 18	Fenway Park organist Josh Kantor (Wash Your Hands with Bill); Actor Tom Hanks (Not My Job)	Negin Farsad, Adam Felber, Peter Grosz
April 25	Actress Allison Janney	Mo Rocca, Luke Burbank, Faith Salie

== May ==
Date	Guest	Panelists
May 2	Actress Christine Baranski	Alonzo Bodden, Joel Kim Booster, Amy Dickinson
May 9	Late-night TV personality Samantha Bee	Adam Burke, Helen Hong, Mo Rocca
May 16	Figure skater Adam Rippon	Negin Farsad, Tom Papa, Paula Poundstone
May 23	Astronaut Christina Koch	Tom Bodett, Maz Jobrani, Alison Leiby
May 30	"Best of" episode featuring skateboarder Tony Hawk, musician Jeff Tweedy, and segments from various Wait Wait road trips	

== June ==
Date	Guest	Panelists
June 6	Author/comedian Sarah Cooper	Alonzo Bodden, Peter Grosz, Helen Hong
June 13	Rock climber Ashima Shiraishi	Negin Farsad, Josh Gondelman, Jessi Klein
June 20	Evolutionary biologist Daniel K. Riskin	Joel Kim Booster, Tom Papa, Roxanne Roberts
June 27	Actor Don Cheadle	Hari Kondabolu, Mo Rocca, Faith Salie

== July ==
Date	Guest	Panelists
July 4	"Best of 2020" episode featuring rap artist Big Boi; actors Tom Hanks and Allison Janney; comic Kumail Nanjiani & writer Emily V. Gordon; and all-Bill Kurtis segments	
July 11	Actress/activist Jameela Jamil	Maeve Higgins, Maz Jobrani, Paula Poundstone
July 18	Writer and psychologist Maria Konnikova	Demi Adejuyigbe, Alonzo Bodden, Amy Dickinson
July 25	Culinary writer and TV host Padma Lakshmi	Peter Grosz, Jessi Klein, Dulcé Sloan

== August ==
Date	Guest	Panelists
August 1	Actor/comedian Ramy Youssef	Josh Gondelman, Helen Hong, Negin Farsad
August 8	Actor Bryan Cranston	Tom Bodett, Joel Kim Booster, Tracy Clayton
August 15	"Best of" episode featuring filmmaker Isabella Rossellini, late-night host Stephen Colbert, food writer Samin Nosrat, and classic Bill Kurtis and Mo Rocca segments	
August 22	"Best of" episode featuring actor Will Arnett, TV personalities Samantha Bee & Karamo Brown, and Film/TV director Barry Sonnenfeld	
August 29	Actress Cecily Strong	Mo Rocca, Alonzo Bodden, Maeve Higgins

== September ==
Date	Guest	Panelists
September 5	Aviator/adventurer Kellee Edwards	Adam Felber, Josh Gondelman, Helen Hong
September 12	Supermodel and TV host Tyra Banks	Luke Burbank, Adam Burke, Jessi Klein
September 19	Actor and singer Titus Burgess	Hari Kondabolu, P. J. O'Rourke, Paula Poundstone
September 26	Jonna Mendez, former disguise chief for the CIA	Alonzo Bodden, Joel Kim Booster, Dulcé Sloan

== October ==
Date	Guest	Panelists
October 3	Karen Pierce, the United Kingdom's ambassador to the U.S.	Brian Babylon, Maz Jobrani, Jessi Klein
October 10	Jason Ward, naturalist and outreach coordinator for the National Audubon Society	Negin Farsad, Roxanne Roberts, Mo Rocca
October 17	"Best of" episode featuring biologist Dan Riskin, writer/TV host Padma Lakshmi, figure skater Adam Rippon, and author/comedian Sarah Cooper	
October 24	Actor Doug Jones	Eugene Cordero, Peter Grosz, Maeve Higgins
October 31	Political consultant Mike Murphy	Alonzo Bodden, Adam Burke, Faith Salie

== November ==
Date	Guest	Panelists
November 7	Las Vegas Aces forward A'ja Wilson	Helen Hong, Maz Jobrani, Dulcé Sloan
November 14	Comedienne/actress Chelsea Peretti	Alonzo Bodden, Joanna Hausmann, Maeve Higgins
November 21	Actress Sarah Paulson	Negin Farsad, Paula Poundstone, Mo Rocca
November 28	"Best of" episode featuring actors Ramy Youssef & Bryan Cranston, rock climber Ashima Shiraishi, and all-Bill Kurtis segments	

== December ==
Date	Guest	Panelists	Notes
December 5	Former alpine skier Lindsey Vonn	Eugene Cordero, Jessi Klein, Faith Salie	Guest host Maz Jobrani
December 12	Economist Robert Reich	Adam Burke, Maeve Higgins, Mo Rocca	Guest host Maz Jobrani
December 19	Este and Alana Haim of the rock band Haim	Tom Bodett, Peter Grosz, Helen Hong	
December 26	"At Home With Peter Sagal" and other previously unaired panel segments "Best of 2020" encores featuring actors Don Cheadle & Titus Burgess and naturalist Jason Ward		
