= List of Wait Wait... Don't Tell Me! episodes =

Below are lists of guests and panelists on Wait Wait... Don't Tell Me!

Note that some guests appear without an explicit promotion despite being affiliated with a news agency, etc. All guests from the early years of 'Wait Wait' were NPR correspondents and personalities. The following lists contain a list of episodes for that particular year.

- 1998
- 1999
- 2000
- 2001
- 2002
- 2003
- 2004
- 2005
- 2006
- 2008
- 2009
- 2010
- 2011
- 2012
- 2013
- 2014
- 2015
- 2016
- 2017
- 2018
- 2019
- 2020
- 2021
- 2022
- 2023
- 2024
- 2025
- 2026
