= Bravin =

Bravin is a surname. Notable people with the surname include:

- Adam Bravin, American musician and producer
- Jess Bravin (born 1965), American journalist
- Leandro Henrique de Oliveira Bravin (born 1986), Brazilian footballer
- Nick Bravin (born 1971), American Olympic fencer and lawyer
