= List of Wait Wait... Don't Tell Me! episodes (1998) =

The following is a list of episodes of Wait Wait... Don't Tell Me! that aired during the NPR news panel game's first year in 1998. Dan Coffey served as original host until being succeeded by Peter Sagal in May. Carl Kasell served as announcer and scorekeeper. Dates indicated are the episodes' original Saturday air dates. Job titles and backgrounds of the guests reflect their status at the time of their appearance.

== January ==
Date	Guest	Panelists
January 3		Roy Blount, Jr., Roxanne Roberts, Peter Sagal
January 10		Roxanne Roberts, Peter Sagal, Margo Kaufman
January 17		Roxanne Roberts, Amy Dickinson, Charlie Pierce
January 24		Margo Kaufman, Roxanne Roberts, Peter Sagal
January 31	Tim Foecke, Titanic scientist	Roy Blount, Jr., Margo Kaufman, Peter Sagal

== February ==
Date	Panelists
February 7	Margo Kaufman, Roxanne Roberts, Peter Sagal
February 14	Margo Kaufman, Roxanne Roberts, Peter Sagal
February 21	Margo Kaufman, Roxanne Roberts, Peter Sagal
February 28	Margo Kaufman, Roxanne Roberts, Peter Sagal

== March ==
Date	Panelists
March 7	Roy Blount, Jr., Margo Kaufman, Peter Sagal
March 14	Margo Kaufman, Peter Sagal, Roxanne Roberts
March 21	Roxanne Roberts, Peter Sagal, Charlie Pierce
March 28	Margo Kaufman, Peter Sagal, Adam Felber

== April ==
Date	Panelists	Notes
April 4	Margo Kaufman, Roxanne Roberts, Peter Sagal	
April 11	Roxanne Roberts, Peter Sagal, Charlie Pierce	
April 18	Margo Kaufman, Charlie Pierce, Roxanne Roberts	
April 25	Margo Kaufman, Roxanne Roberts, Peter Sagal	Dan Coffey's final episode as host

== May ==
Date	Guest	Panelists	Notes
May 2	NPR special correspondent Susan Stamberg	Adam Felber, Charlie Pierce, Roxanne Roberts	Peter Sagal's first episode as host First edition of the "Not My Job" guest segment
May 9	Robert Siegel, host of NPR's All Things Considered	Adam Felber, Charlie Pierce, Roxanne Roberts	
May 16	NPR correspondent Peter Overby	Adam Felber, Charlie Pierce, Roxanne Roberts	First episode to feature "Who's Carl This Time?" as a segment
May 23	NPR Pentagon correspondent Martha Raddatz	Adam Felber, Roxanne Roberts, Margo Kaufman	
May 30	NPR correspondent Joe Palca	Charlie Pierce, Margo Kaufman, Roxanne Roberts	

== June ==
Date	Guest	Panelists
June 6	NPR newscaster Corey Flintoff	Adam Felber, Charlie Pierce, Roxanne Roberts
June 13	NPR Talk of the Nation host Ray Suarez	Charlie Pierce, Adam Felber, Roxanne Roberts
June 20	Columnist and radio personality Bob Garfield	Adam Felber, Charlie Pierce, Margo Kaufman
June 27	NPR Midwest correspondent Cheryl Corley	Margo Kaufman, Charlie Pierce, Roxanne Roberts

== July ==
Date	Guest	Panelists
July 4	This American Life host/producer Ira Glass	Adam Felber, Margo Kaufman, Roxanne Roberts
July 11	NPR correspondent Renée Montagne	Roy Blount Jr., Roxanne Roberts, Charlie Pierce
July 18	NPR sports correspondent Tom Goldman	Adam Felber, Roxanne Roberts, Charlie Pierce
July 25	Linda Wertheimer, host of NPR's All Things Considered	Margo Kaufman, Charlie Pierce, Roxanne Roberts

== August ==
Date	Guest	Panelists
August 1	NPR science correspondent Richard Harris	Roy Blount Jr., Adam Felber, Roxanne Roberts
August 8	NPR business reporter Madeleine Brand	Adam Felber, Roxanne Roberts, Charlie Pierce
August 15	NPR contributor Kevin Kling	Adam Felber, Roxanne Roberts, Margo Kaufman
August 22	NPR Theme music composer B. J. Leiderman	Roy Blount, Jr., Charlie Pierce, Roxanne Roberts
August 29	NPR Los Angeles correspondent Andy Bowers	Adam Felber, Charlie Pierce, Roxanne Roberts

== September ==
Date	Guest	Panelists	Notes
September 5	NPR correspondent Neal Conan	Roxanne Roberts, Margo Kaufman, Charlie Pierce	
September 12	NPR correspondent Margot Adler	Roy Blount Jr., Adam Felber, Roxanne Roberts	
September 19	NPR State Department reporter Ted Clark	Adam Felber, Roxanne Roberts, Charlie Pierce	
September 26	NPR senior correspondent Jacki Lyden	Adam Felber, Roxanne Roberts, Charlie Pierce	First edition of the "Bluff the Listener" segment

== October ==
Date	Guest	Panelists	Notes
October 3	Weekend Edition Saturday commentator Ketzel Levine	Roy Blount Jr., Adam Felber, Roxanne Roberts	
October 10	NPR cultural correspondent Dean Olsher	Roy Blount Jr., Roxanne Roberts, Margo Kaufman	
October 17	no guest	Roy Blount Jr., Adam Felber, Roxanne Roberts	First edition of the "Listener Limerick Challenge"
October 24	NPR media correspondent Brooke Gladstone	Roxanne Roberts, Nell Benjamin, Charlie Pierce	
October 31	NPR news reference librarian Kee Malesky	Roy Blount Jr., Charlie Pierce, Roxanne Roberts	

== November ==
Date	Guest	Panelists
November 7	NPR correspondent Melissa Block	Adam Felber, Charlie Pierce, Roxanne Roberts
November 14	NPR transportation correspondent Steve Inskeep	Adam Felber, Charlie Pierce, Roxanne Roberts
November 21	NPR president Kevin Klose	Adam Felber, Charlie Pierce, Roxanne Roberts
November 28	Best Of Wait Wait Episode	

== December ==
Date	Guest	Panelists
December 5	NPR environment correspondent John Neilsen	Sue Ellicott, Charlie Pierce, Roxanne Roberts
December 12	NPR London correspondent Michael Goldfarb	Roxanne Roberts, Roy Blount, Jr., Adam Felber
December 19	NPR health care correspondent Joanne Silberner	Adam Felber, Charlie Pierce, Roxanne Roberts
December 26	Liane Hansen, host of NPR's Weekend Edition Sunday	Adam Felber, Charlie Pierce, Roxanne Roberts
