= Bigmouth =

Bigmouth may refer to:

- "Bigmouth", a song by Underworld
- Bigmouth, an ogre in The Smurfs comics and animated cartoon series

== Marine life ==
- Bigmouth buffalo, fish
- Bigmouth goby, fish
- Bigmouth skate, fish
- Bigmouth rocksnail, snail

== See also ==
- "Bigmouth Strikes Again", a 1986 alternative rock song by The Smiths
- Big Mouth (disambiguation)
