= Big Mouth =

Big Mouth may refer to:

== Film and television ==
- Big Mouth (American TV series), an animated television series
- Big Mouth (South Korean TV series), a 2022 South Korean television series
- The Big Mouth, 1967 comedy film starring Jerry Lewis
- Nickname of Martha Raye (1916–1994), TV and film actress

== Music ==
- "Big Mouth" (Snoop Dogg song), 2017
- "Big Mouth" (Nikki Yanofsky song), 2018
- "Words (Big Mouth)", a song by Ian Hunter from the album Shrunken Heads
- "Big Mouth", a song by the Muffs from the album The Muffs
- "Big Mouth", a song by Nikki Lane from the album Highway Queen
- "Big Mouth", a song by Santigold from the album Master of My Make-Believe
- "Big Mouth", a song by Whodini from the album Escape
- Big Mouth (2024), an album by Brooke Alexx

== Other uses ==
- Big Mouth (chief) (1822–1869), Native American Brulé Sioux leader
- Big Mouth House, publisher
- Big Mouth Billy Bass, animatronic singing toy

== See also ==
- Bigmouth (disambiguation)
