= Leandro Bravin =

Brazilian footballer

Personal information
- Full name: Leandro Henrique de Oliveira Bravin
- Date of birth: May 13, 1986 (age 40)
- Place of birth: Maringá, Brazil
- Height: 1.75 m (5 ft 9 in)
- Position: Attacking midfielder

Youth career
- Years: Team
- 2001–2004: Londrina
- 2005–2007: Atlético-PR

Leandro Henrique de Oliveira Bravin or simply Leandro Bravin (born May 13, 1986, in Maringá), is a Brazilian attacking midfielder. His Atlético-PR contract expired in September 2007.
