= Why? with Hannibal Buress =

American late-night television series

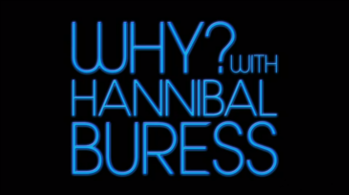
- Genre: Comedy
- Created by: Hannibal Buress
- Presented by: Hannibal Buress
- Country of origin: United States
- Original language: English
- No. of seasons: 1
- No. of episodes: 8

Production
- Executive producers: Dave Becky; Hannibal Buress; Jeff Stilson
- Running time: 22 minutes
- Production companies: Bird Gang Bang Birds Productions; Top Paddock Productions; 3 Arts Entertainment; Comedy Partners

Original release
- Network: Comedy Central
- Release: July 8 – August 26, 2015

Why? with Hannibal Buress is an American late-night television series hosted by Hannibal Buress. On March 10, 2015, the series was green-lit for an eight-episode season. The series premiered on July 8, 2015, on Comedy Central. The show was meant to provide a look into the host's mind with episodes undertaking social issues through sketches, man on the street interviews, special guests and stand-up in front of a studio audience. In December 2015, Hannibal Buress confirmed the series would not return for a second season. He told the New York Post that "it wasn't the ideal format for me."

== Episodes ==
No.	Title	Original release date	US viewers (millions)
1	"8th of July Celebration!"	July 8, 2015	0.586
2	"Get the F Out of Here"	July 15, 2015	0.352
3	"Hannibal Goes to a PETA Protest"	July 22, 2015	0.383
4	"Hannibal Has Beef"	July 29, 2015	0.344
5	"Hannibal Buress Converses Calmly With a Dentist and a Lion"	August 5, 2015	0.428
6	"Hannibal Goes to Hell to Find Out What's In That Bag"	August 12, 2015	0.383
7	"Hannibal Approaches the Finish Line While Wearing a Deep V-Neck T-Shirt"	August 19, 2015	0.330
8	"Hannibal and Kate Plus 8"	August 26, 2015	0.297
