= Jess Bravin =

Wall Street Journal correspondent

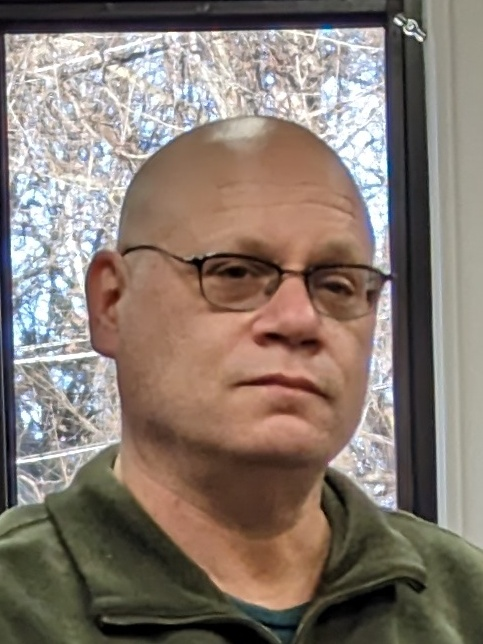
- Born: 1965 (age 60–61)
- Education: Harvard College (AB); University of California, Berkeley, School of Law (JD)
- Occupation: Journalist
- Years active: 1985–present
- Website: blogs.wsj.com/law/jess-bravin/

Jess M. Bravin (born 1965) is an American journalist. Since 2005, he has been the Wall Street Journal correspondent for the United States Supreme Court.

== Background ==
Bravin graduated with an AB in history from Harvard College in 1987, where he wrote for The Harvard Crimson. His roommate at Harvard was Peter Sagal, humorist, writer, and host of NPR game show Wait Wait... Don't Tell Me!. In 1997, he earned his J.D. degree from the University of California, Berkeley, School of Law.

== Career ==
Early in his career, Bravin was a reporter for the Los Angeles Times and contributed to including the Washington Post, Harper’s Bazaar, and Spy magazine. He also read scripts for a talent agency and managed a campaign for a local school board. While in law school, he served on the University of California Board of Regents and as a City Council appointee to the Berkeley, Calif., Police Review Commission and Zoning Adjustments Board.

Bravin joined the Wall Street Journal first as it California editor in San Francisco. He then became its national legal-affairs reporter. In 2005, he became Supreme Court correspondent for the Wall Street Journal.

He has taught at the University of California Washington Center.

== Personal ==
Bravin led the effort to designate Raymond Chandler Square (Los Angeles City Historic-Cultural Monument No. 597) in Hollywood, in honor of the hard-boiled novelist.

== Awards and recognition ==
- John Jacobs Fellowship at Berkeley's Graduate School of Journalism and Institute of Governmental Studies
- John Field Simms Sr. Memorial Lectureship in Law at the University of New Mexico's School of Law
- Elizabeth Neuffer Memorial Prize
- American Bar Association's Silver Gavel Award
- National Press Foundation
- New York News Publishers Association
- New York Press Club

== Works ==
Books:

- Squeaky: The Life and Times of Lynette Alice Fromme (1997)
- The Terror Courts: Rough Justice at Guantanamo Bay (2014)

Chapters: Bravin has contributed to:

- Violence in America: An Encyclopedia
- Crimes of War 2.0
- A Concise Introduction to Logic

Articles:

- Wall Street Journal (latest)
