= Jessi Klein =

American writer, actress and comedian

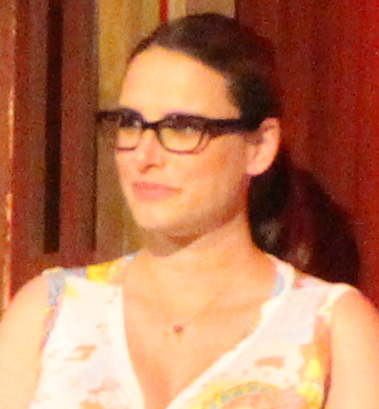
- Jessi Klein at the 74th Annual Peabody Awards for Inside Amy Schumer, in 2015
- Born: Jessi Ruth Klein; August 18, 1975 (age 51); New York City, New York, U.S.
- Education: Vassar College (AB)
- Spouse: Michael Engleman (m. 2014, divorced)
- Children: 1

Comedy career
- Medium: Writing, television, stand-up comedy, acting
- Genres: Observational comedy, satire, political satire, sarcasm
- Subjects: American culture, sex, everyday life, human behavior, American politics, pop culture

Jessi Ruth Klein (born August 18, 1975) is an American writer, actress and stand-up comedian from New York City. Klein has regularly appeared on shows such as The Showbiz Show with David Spade and VH1's Best Week Ever and has performed stand-up on Comedy Central's Premium Blend. She provided commentary for CNN in the debates of the 2004 presidential election. A self-proclaimed "geek", Klein has appeared on the television specials for My Coolest Years: Geeks on VH1 and Rise of the Geeks on E!. Klein also provided the voices of Lucy in the animated pilot for Adult Swim's Lucy, the Daughter of the Devil and Jessi Glaser on the Netflix animated series Big Mouth.

Klein previously worked as a director of development for Comedy Central. Some of the shows she helped develop for the network were Chappelle's Show and Stella. She was the head writer and executive producer of Inside Amy Schumer.

== Career ==
In 2004, Klein appears twice in the Season 2 "Wayne Brady Show" episode of Chappelle's Show: first, in the boardroom to inform Dave of how replaceable he is on the show, and later she along with Neal Brennan are gassed by Chappelle "in the wings" just before Chappelle confronts Wayne Brady to take his show back.

In 2009, she wrote and co-starred in Michael and Michael Have Issues on Comedy Central. She also worked as a writer on Saturday Night Live during the 2009-2010 season.

Klein's Comedy Central Presents special aired on March 4, 2011.

Klein made her first-time appearance as a panelist on NPR's comedy-news quiz show Wait Wait... Don't Tell Me! on June 25, 2011. She was the first female guest host of the program on March 11, 2017.

She was an executive producer and writer for Inside Amy Schumer on Comedy Central since its debut, and won a Primetime Emmy Award for Outstanding Variety Sketch Series in 2015 for her work on the show. She was not a writer on its fifth season. She was also a consulting producer on the series "Transparent" in 2016.

Klein released her debut book in July 2016, You'll Grow Out of It, which became a New York Times best seller. Klein's second book, I'll Show Myself Out: Essays on Midlife and Motherhood, was released in April 2022.

Klein served as a consulting producer for the Netflix series animated sitcom Big Mouth between 2017 and 2025, and provided the voice for one of the series' main characters, Jessi Glaser.

== Personal life ==
Klein married in 2014 and has a son. She and her husband have since divorced.

She has been living in Los Angeles since 2023.

Klein is Jewish.

== Selected works ==
=== Books ===
- Klein, Jessi (2016). You'll Grow Out of It. Grand Central Publishing.
- Klein, Jessi (2022). I'll Show Myself Out: Essays on Midlife and Motherhood. Harper.

=== Essays and reporting ===
- Klein, Jessi (May 23, 2016). "The bath : a polemic". Personal History. The New Yorker. Vol. 92, no. 15. pp. 36–37.
