= Brian Babylon =

American comedian

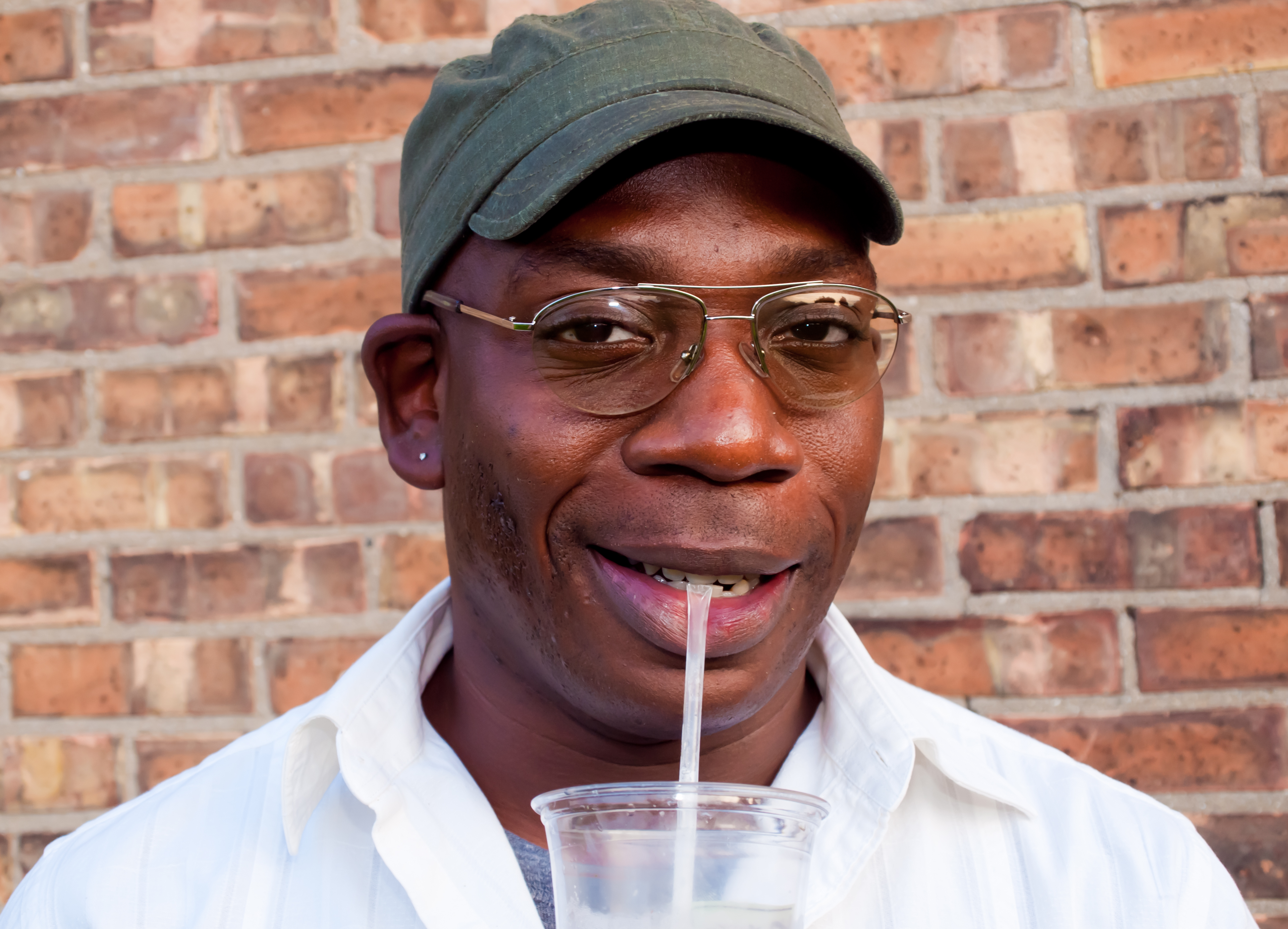
- Brian Babylon Actor Comedian
- Born: December 23, 1975 (age 50); Chicago, Illinois, U.S.

Brian Babylon (born December 23, 1975) is an American comedian and radio host from Chicago. Babylon is a regular panelist on NPR's Wait Wait... Don't Tell Me!, a regular host of The Moth story telling event in Chicago, has appeared on the national broadcast, and is a regular contributor to Chicago Ideas.

From 2009 to 2015, he co-hosted "The Morning AMP" radio show on Vocalo with Molly Adams and regularly appeared on WBEZ talk shows. As an actor, he appeared on Inside Amy Schumer. He was also on the production team of Why? with Hannibal Buress. He founded the Bronzeville Comedy Showcase in 2007.

== Credits ==
Television
Year	Title	Role	Notes
2015	Inside Amy Schumer	Mark	S3, E8
2015	Why? with Hannibal Buress	Multi-platform producer	
