= Mo Rocca =

American humorist, journalist and actor (born 1969)

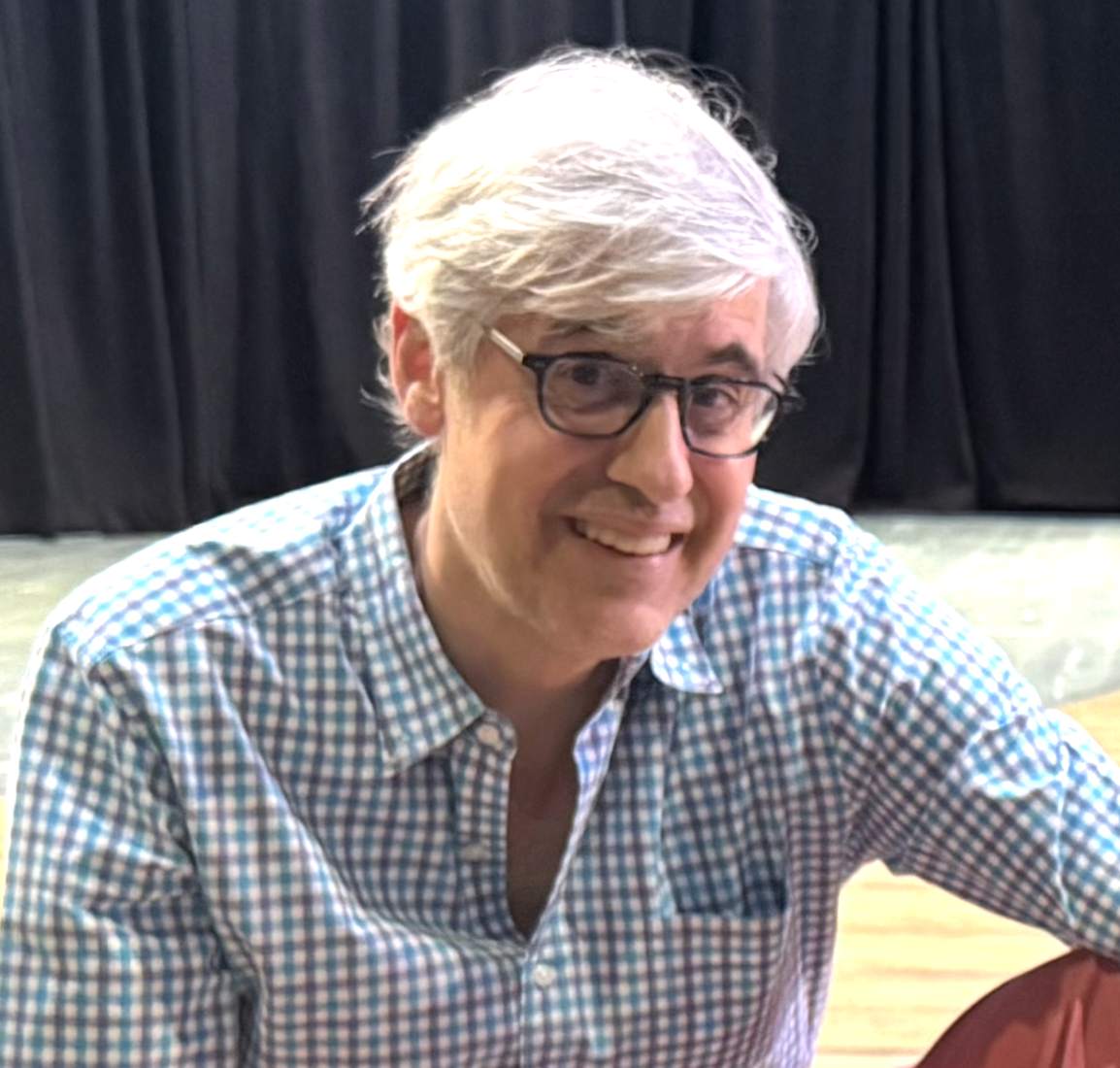
- Rocca in 2025
- Born: Maurice Alberto Rocca; January 28, 1969 (age 57); Washington, D.C., U.S.
- Education: Harvard University (BA)
- Notable work: The Daily Show; The Tonight Show; Wait Wait... Don't Tell Me!; CBS Sunday Morning; The Henry Ford's Innovation Nation

Comedy career
- Years active: 1995–present
- Medium: Television; radio; blog
- Genres: Humor, News

Maurice Alberto "Mo" Rocca (born January 28, 1969) is an American humorist, journalist, and actor. He is a correspondent for CBS Sunday Morning, the host and creator of My Grandmother's Ravioli on the Cooking Channel, and also the host of The Henry Ford's Innovation Nation on CBS. He was the moderator of the National Geographic Society's National Geographic Bee from 2016 until its final competition in 2019, as the 2020 and 2021 competitions were cancelled and the competition was ended in 2021. He is also the host of the podcast Mobituaries with Mo Rocca from CBS News. He is a regular panelist on the radio quiz show Wait Wait... Don't Tell Me!

Mo Rocca got his start in television behind the scenes, writing and producing several children's TV shows, starting with the PBS series, Wishbone, from 1995-1997. His first work in front of the camera came as a correspondent for news satire show The Daily Show from 1998 to 2003. He played a similar role as a satirical correspondent for The Tonight Show with Jay Leno from 2004 to 2008, and later moved on to more serious roles with CBS News for which he continues to work. He has also acted in theater, film, and on television in small roles from time to time, and has written two books.

== Early life and education ==
Rocca was born in Washington, D.C. His mother emigrated there from Bogotá, Colombia, in 1956 at age 28, and his father was a third generation Italian-American from Leominster, Massachusetts. He lived in Bethesda, Maryland and attended Wood Acres Elementary School. He attended Georgetown Preparatory School, a Jesuit boys' school in North Bethesda, Maryland, graduating with the Class of 1987. He graduated from Harvard University in 1991 with a Bachelor of Arts degree in literature. He served as president of Harvard's Hasty Pudding Theatricals, performing in four of the company's notorious burlesques and co-authoring one (Suede Expectations). While at Harvard, he also played Seymour in a production of Little Shop of Horrors which co-starred future Supreme Court Justice Ketanji Brown Jackson.

== Career ==
=== Film ===
Rocca appeared in the 2005 film Bewitched and, in 2007, in the independent science-fiction family comedy I'll Believe You with fellow Daily Show alumnus Ed Helms. In 2012, Rocca was the narrator of the documentary Electoral Dysfunction, a movie which satirically analyzes the American voting system and which aired on PBS in 2012 and 2016.

=== Journalism ===
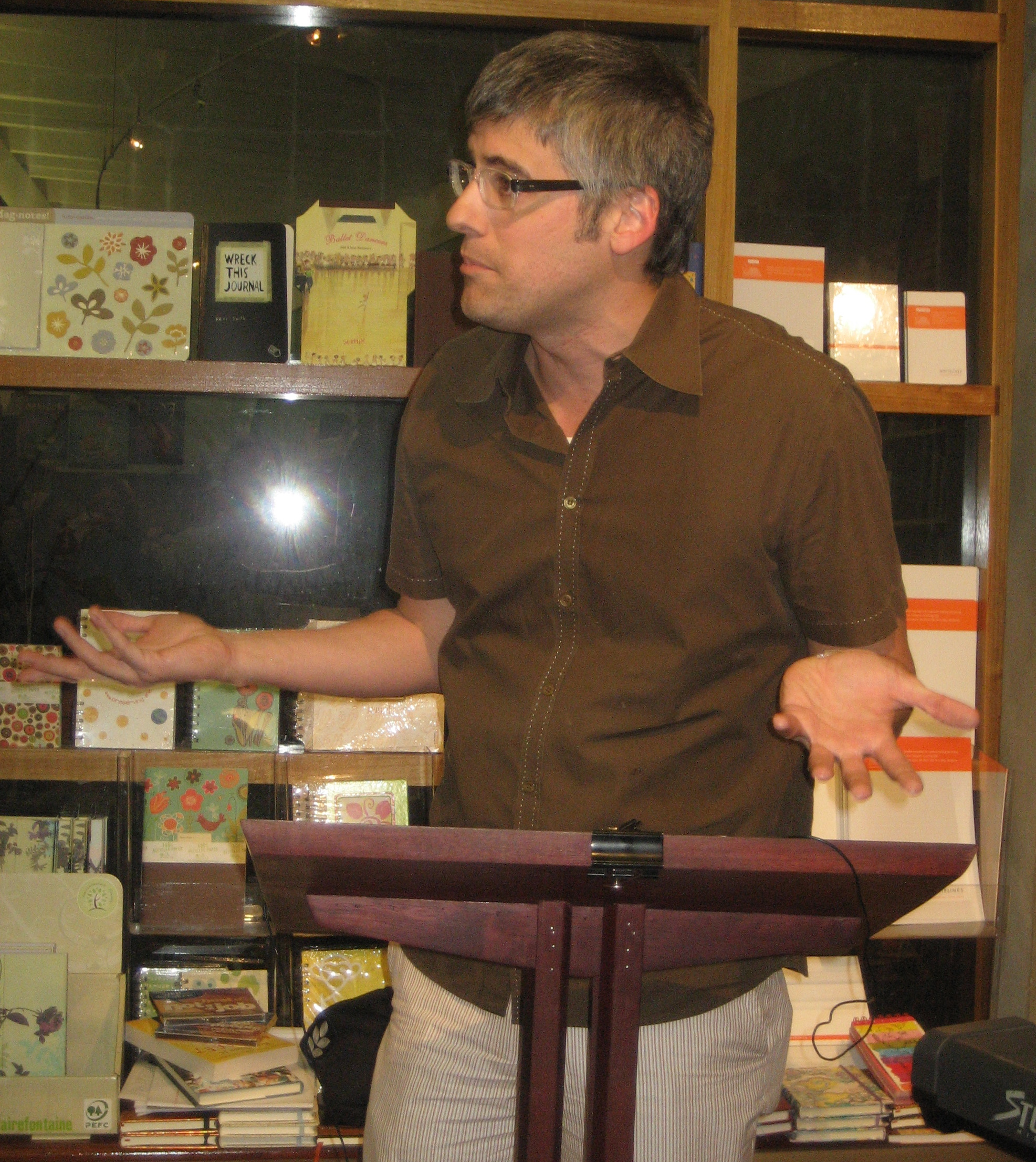
Wait Wait... Don't Tell Me! reception at Octavia Books in Uptown New Orleans (2010)

In 2004, he served as a convention-floor correspondent for Larry King Live at the Democratic and Republican national conventions.

Rocca has been a regular correspondent for CBS Sunday Morning with Jane Pauley since 2012. His work includes cover stories, features, and profiles (such as of Chris Rock and Amy Schumer) with an emphasis on presidential history.

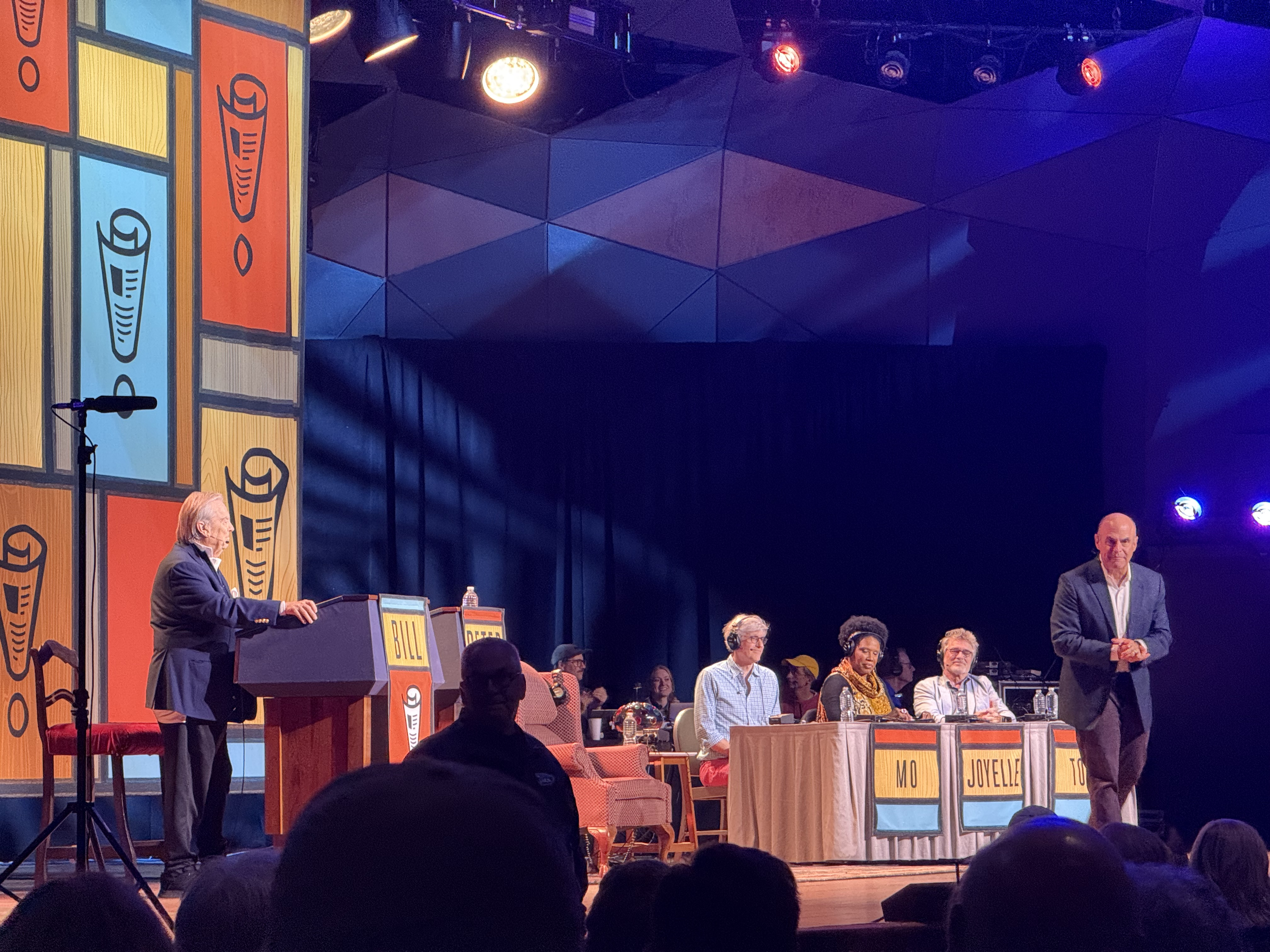
Mo Rocca as a panelist on Wait Wait... Don't Tell Me!

=== Radio and podcasts ===
He is a regular panelist on the quiz show Wait Wait... Don't Tell Me! on the NPR radio network.

Rocca turned his fascination with obituaries into a podcast called Mobituaries.

=== Television ===
From 1998 to 2003, Rocca was a regular correspondent for The Daily Show, which gave him his start in television. His work included campaign coverage for Indecision 2000 and a regular feature called "That's Quite Interesting".

He was a regular correspondent for The Tonight Show on the NBC TV network from 2004 to 2008, and covered the 2008 election for NBC.

Rocca created and hosted the program My Grandmother's Ravioli with CBS Eye Productions on the Cooking Channel from 2012 to 2015, for which he traveled across the United States, learning to cook from grandmothers and grandfathers in their kitchens.

He previously hosted Food(ography) on the Cooking Channel and was a regular judge on Iron Chef America on the Food Network.

Rocca was a commentator on VH1's I Love the '70s and I Love the '80s. He was the host of Bravo's Things I Hate About You channel and Whoa! Sunday, which premiered in 2005 on the Animal Planet TV channel. He also made guest appearances for the Law & Order television franchise in the episodes "Authority" (Law & Order: Special Victims Unit) and "Contract" (Law & Order: Criminal Intent), both in 2008.

In 2014, Rocca appeared on The Young and the Restless as Milton, the accountant. He reprised the role for the 50th anniversary of the show in 2023.

He was also the host of the weekly The Henry Ford's Innovation Nation program, which first aired as part of the CBS Dream Team on Saturdays in 2014 and has produced a total of ten seasons.

On May 13, 2015, Rocca appeared on a celebrity episode of Jeopardy! and came in second to CNN correspondent John Berman, amassing a total of $41,600. He returned on December 6, 2023, amassing $25,200 during his quarterfinal match. He would eventually make it to the finals, once again coming in second to actress Lisa Ann Walter and winning $250,000. During both times on the show, he played in support of the Inner-City Scholarship Fund, a New York-based charity that helps low-income families enroll their children in Catholic Schools through financial aid.

Rocca moderated the finals of the National Geographic Bee from 2016 until its final competition in 2019.

Rocca played a conservative morning TV show host in the second season of The Good Fight in 2018.

=== Theater ===
Rocca began his career acting on stage in the Southeast Asia tour of the musical Grease (1993) and Paper Mill Playhouse's South Pacific (1994).

On Broadway, Rocca played the role of Vice Principal Douglas Panch in The 25th Annual Putnam County Spelling Bee.

=== Writing ===
His first television work was as a writer and producer for the Emmy and Peabody Award-winning children's television series Wishbone. He also wrote for The Wubbulous World of Dr. Seuss on the Nickelodeon TV channel and Pepper Ann on the ABC TV network.

Rocca's satirical book, All the Presidents' Pets: The Story of One Reporter Who Refused to Roll Over, deals with American presidents, their pets, and reporters and was published by Crown Books in 2004.

His contribution to AOL Newsbloggers was titled Mo Rocca 180°: Only Half as Tedious as the Regular News.

In 2011, he won an Emmy as a writer for the 64th Annual Tony Awards.

In 2019, Rocca co-authored Mobituaries with Jonathan Greenberg, a book about underappreciated people in history such as Elizabeth Jennings Graham. In June 2024, Rocca and Greenberg released Roctogenarians, a Mobituaries-style book focusing on people such as Matisse and Carol Channing, who achieved success later in life. Both books were New York Times Bestsellers.

== Personal life ==
In July 2011, Rocca revealed on The Six Pack podcast (episode 73) that he is gay.

On September 25, 2015, Rocca served as Lector during the Mass celebrated by Pope Francis at New York City's Madison Square Garden, giving a reading in Spanish. His participation was hailed by gay rights advocates.
