= Maz Jobrani =

Iranian American comedian and actor (born 1972)

- ماز جبرانی
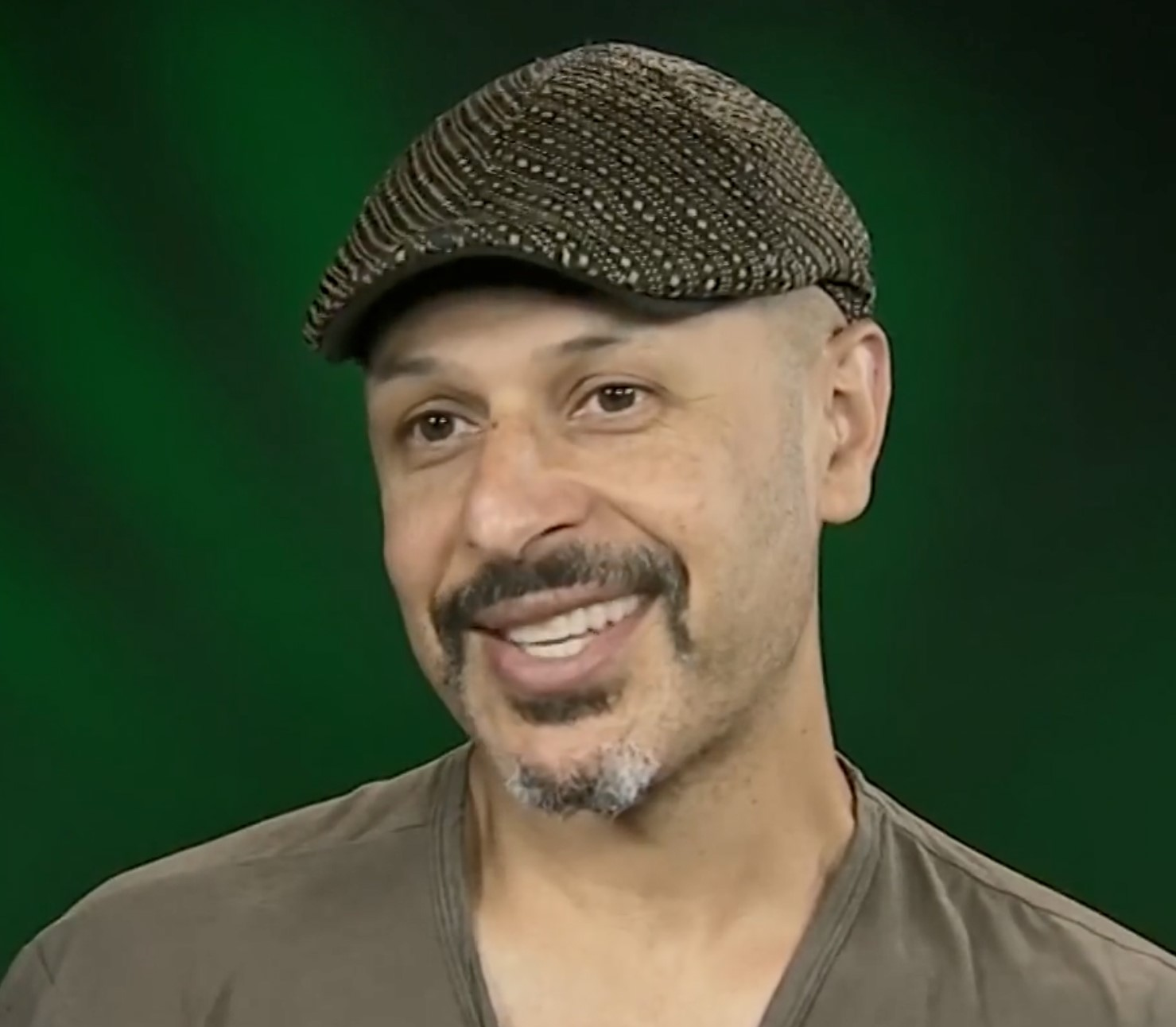
- Jobrani in 2017
- Born: Maziyar Jobrani; February 26, 1972 (age 54); Tehran, Iran
- Education: University of California, Berkeley (B.A.)
- Spouse: Preetha Jobrani (m. 2006)
- Children: 2

Comedy career
- Years active: 1990s–present
- Medium: Stand-up; television; film
- Genres: Observational comedy; satire
- Subjects: Racism/race relations; Islamophobia; Iranian culture; Islam in the United States; Middle East
- Website: mazjobrani.com

Maziyar Jobrani (Note: Persian: مازیار جبرانی, romanized: Mâzyâr Jobrâni) (born February 26, 1972), better known as Maz Jobrani (Note: Persian: ماز جبرانی, romanized: Mâz Jobrâni), is an Iranian-American comedian and actor who was part of the "Axis of Evil" comedy group. The group appeared on a comedy special on Comedy Central. Jobrani has also appeared in numerous films, television shows, including Better Off Ted, on radio, and in comedy clubs. His filmography includes roles in The Interpreter, Friday After Next, Dragonfly, and Jimmy Vestvood: Amerikan Hero. He appeared as a regular character on the 2017 CBS sitcom Superior Donuts. He had been an advisory board member of the National Iranian American Council (NIAC).

== Early life and education ==
Jobrani was born in Tehran, Iran. He and his parents moved to California when he was six years old. He was raised in Tiburon in the San Francisco Bay area. He attended Redwood High School in Larkspur, and was inducted into the Redwood distinguished alumni class of 2017. Jobrani studied political science and Italian at University of California, Berkeley, where he received a B.A. degree. He was enrolled in a PhD program at University of California, Los Angeles when he decided to pursue his childhood dream of acting and performing comedy.

Jobrani performing in January 2023

== Career ==
=== Television and radio ===
Jobrani has since made appearances on shows like The Colbert Report, The Tonight Show with Jay Leno, The Late Late Show with Craig Ferguson, Talkshow with Spike Feresten, Whitney, and regularly performs at top comedy clubs (in California and New York) such as The Comedy Store. He made an appearance as a dental patient on an episode of Still Standing, in the pilot episodes of Better Off Ted, The Knights of Prosperity, on an episode of Cedric the Entertainer Presents, on an episode of Malcolm in the Middle as Robber #2 and on an episode of The West Wing as a Saudi prince. He also made appearances in 13 Going on 30 and Bug. He has toured with the Axis of Evil Comedy Tour. He provided the voice of Ahmed Farahnakian in the audiobook version of World War Z. Jobrani has written a movie with a friend called Jimmy Vestvood: Amerikan Hero.

Jobrani makes occasional appearances on NPR's news quiz show Wait Wait... Don't Tell Me! and American Public Media's Wits. He appeared on episode 118, October 28, 2010, of WTF with Marc Maron. Additionally, Jobrani co-hosts his own podcast on the All Things Comedy podcasting network with fellow comedians Al Madrigal, Chris Spencer, and Aaron Aryanpur. Titled Minivan Men, the podcast chronicles the lives and experiences of the hosts with particular focus on fatherhood.

He played Jafar in the 2015 musical fantasy television film Descendants.

In 2015, Jobrani released a memoir entitled I'm Not a Terrorist, But I've Played One On TV.

=== Standup style ===
Jobrani's jokes focus on race and the misunderstanding of Middle Easterners in America. He also talks about his family.

=== Social and political activities ===
Jobrani had been a board member of the National Iranian American Council (NIAC). In 2015, he stepped down after discovering NIAC's alleged ties to the Iranian government. He also sits on the board of the Persian American Cancer Institute (PACI.org) and also works with International Society for Children with Cancer (ISCC-Charity.org).

In 2025, Jobrani participated in the Riyadh Comedy Festival. Joey Shea, Saudi Arabia researcher at Human Rights Watch, said in a statement that the Saudi government is using the comedy festival to whitewash its human rights abuses.

== Personal life ==
In 2006, Jobrani married an Indian-American attorney named Pretha. They have a son and daughter and reside in California.

Jobrani has two younger brothers and an older sister. His youngest brother is A. Joseph "Joey" Jobrani. His second youngest brother is Kashi Jobrani (1977–2014). His older sister, director/producer Mariam Jobrani, was born in 1969 and died in 2017 from metastatic breast cancer.

In August 2026, Jobrani announced that he had cancer following emergency brain surgery in December 2025.

== Stand up specials ==
- 2007 Axis of Evil Comedy Special
- 2009 Brown & Friendly
- 2013 I Come in Peace
- 2015 I'm Not a Terrorist, But I've Played One On TV
- 2017 Immigrant
- 2023 The Birds & The Bees

== Books ==
- Maz Jobrani (2015). I'm Not a Terrorist, But I've Played One On TV: Memoirs of a Middle Eastern Funny Man. Simon & Schuster. ISBN 978-1476749983.

== Award ==
In 2025, Jobrani received a Carnegie Corporation of New York Great Immigrant Award.

== See also ==
- Iranian stand-up comedy
- Axis of Evil Comedy Tour
