= Peter Grosz =

American actor and television writer

- Born: New York City
- Occupations: Actor, writer

Peter Grosz is an American actor and television writer. He is most recognizable for appearing in Sonic Drive-In's "Two Guys" commercials, in which he appears as the straight man in a double act with improvisational comedian T. J. Jagodowski until they were replaced by newer ads featuring families in 2020.

== Early life and education ==
Grosz was born in New York City, and was raised in Scarsdale, New York. Grosz is Jewish. For years he attended Camp Greylock in Massachusetts where he was a Red & Grey captain. He attended Northwestern University, graduating in 1996. One of his college roommates during that time was fellow actor Seth Meyers.

== Career ==
From 2002 to 2012 and 2014 on, Grosz has starred as one half of the "Two Guys" for the Sonic Drive-In commercials alongside fellow improviser T. J. Jagodowski. In 2020, it was reported that Sonic's commercials would be going in a different direction, but that the "Two Guys" series would continue to be part of the chain's advertising in some way. Lori Abou Habib, Sonic's chief marketing officer, said that the commercials are "a huge part of our voice, and they’ll be part of our brand going forward." The two actors also appeared together in the 2006 film Stranger Than Fiction.

Grosz worked as a writer for The Colbert Report from 2007 to 2010, where he has appeared on screen at least four times: once as the Time-Travelling Brandy Thief, once as a version of himself on September 23, 2008, once on May 13, 2010, to interrupt Stephen Colbert's attempt to introduce guest band The Hold Steady, only to perform the introduction himself, and on January 9, 2013, as McGnaw the Gluten-Free Beaver. In addition, the May 13, 2010 episode ended with Colbert wishing farewell to the Time-Travelling Brandy Thief; Grosz confirmed on his Facebook page that this was his last episode of the Report as a writer. Additionally, the birth of his child was announced on the show on March 9, 2009.

Grosz joined the writing staff of Late Night with Seth Meyers in 2014.

Grosz recurred on the HBO comedy series Veep, playing callous oil lobbyist Sidney Purcell over four of the first five seasons. He also played Mike Pence on The President Show.

On December 18, 2018, Grosz appeared on The Late Show with Stephen Colbert as Stephen Miller, Senior Advisor for policy to US President Donald Trump, in a sketch with Colbert about Miller's appearance on Face the Nation the previous Sunday.

Grosz also routinely appears as a panelist and has been a guest host on the NPR show Wait Wait... Don't Tell Me!.

In April 2023, he made his Broadway debut playing Robert Sarnoff, President of NBC, in the Tony Award-winning play Good Night, Oscar, opposite Tony Award winner Sean Hayes.

== Filmography ==
=== Acting ===
==== Film ====
Year	Title	Role	Notes
2005	The Weather Man	Shelly's Archery Instructor	
2006	Stranger than Fiction	IRS Co-Worker No. 5	
2008	The Promotion	Guy in Windbreaker	
2014	Drifters	Albert	Short film
2015	Slow Learners	Dr. Mark Sonderskov	
2017	Aardvark	Anthony	
2017	Rough Night	Cliff	
2021	Things Heard & Seen	Martin	
2021	Here Today	Doctor Joe	
2022	The Menu	Sommelier	
2022	Who Invited Charlie?	Trey Reynolds	

==== Television ====
Year	Title	Role	Notes
2007	Science Digest	Brad Crane	Episode: "Animal Guy"
2011	Curb Your Enthusiasm	Minyan Member No. 2	Episode: "Mister Softee"
2012	Key & Peele	David Schwartzman	Episode: "Landlord"
2012–2019	Veep	Sidney Purcell	12 episodes
2013	The Chris Gethard Show	Chef Michael Dinaldi	Episode: "Let's Sell Out with Real Late Night Characters"
2013	Inside Amy Schumer	Jason's Father	Episode: "Clown Panties"
2014	Deadbeat	Jeremy Goldberg	Episode: "The Ghost in the Machine"
2014–2015	Late Night with Seth Meyers	Various characters	12 episodes
2015–2016	Cop Show	Manager	18 episodes
2016	Vinyl	Nate Druker	2 episodes
2016	Odd Mom Out	Dylan Unger	Episode: "The O.D.D. Couple"
2016	Jon Glaser Loves Gear	Photographer	Episode: "Photography"
2019	A President Show Documentary: The Fall Of Donald Trump	Mike Pence	Television film
2019	The Loudest Voice	Alan Colmes	Episode: "2001"
2019	You're Not a Monster	Frankenstein / Freddy / Cannibal	4 episodes
2019	Living with Yourself	Too Hip	Episode: "Va Bene"
2019	The Marvelous Mrs. Maisel	Bernie Zucker	3 episodes
2020	Little America	Man with Yarmulke	Episode: "The Silence"
2020	At Home with Amy Sedaris	Amy's Date	Episode: "First Dates"
2021	Search Party	Roger Carrots	Episode: "Something Sharp"
2021	The Crew	Director	Episode: "Hot Mushroom Meat"
2021	Gossip Girl	Mr. Spencer	Episode: "You Can't Take It with Jules"
2022	Fleishman Is in Trouble	Camp director	2 episodes
2023	New Amsterdam	Eric	Episode: "Right Place"
2023	White House Plumbers	Earl Silbert	Episode: "True Believers"
2024	Elsbeth	Leonard Rosen	Episode: "A Classic New York Character"
2025	The Beast in Me	Elijah Garrity	3 episodes

==== Theatre ====
Year	Title	Role	Notes
2023	Good Night, Oscar	Robert Sarnoff, President of NBC	Broadway debut

==== Commercials ====
Year	Role	Company
2002-2012 and 2014-2020	Himself ("Two Guys")	Sonic Drive-In
?-present	Himself ("Two Guys")	Jiffy Lube

=== Writing ===
Year	Title	Notes
2007	UCB Comedy Originals	Episode: "2 Square"
2007	The Naked Trucker and T-Bones Show	8 episodes
2007–2010	The Colbert Report	189 episodes
2008	The Daily Show	Episode: "Indecision 2008: Election Night – America's Choice"
2011	Wait Wait... Don't Tell Me!: A Royal Pain in the News	Television special
2014	66th Primetime Emmy Awards	Television special
2014–2015	Late Night with Seth Meyers	44 episodes
2017	The President Show	21 episodes
2020	At Home with Amy Sedaris	2 episodes
