= Roy Blount Jr. =

American writer (born 1941)

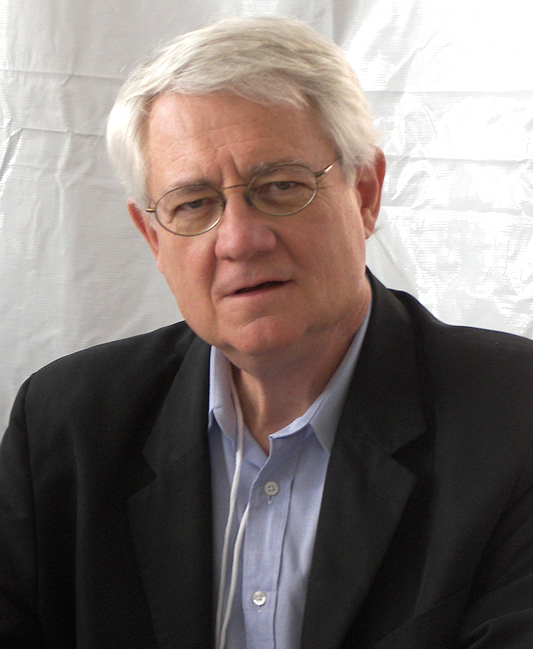
- Blount at the 2007 Texas Book Festival
- Born: Roy Alton Blount Jr. October 4, 1941 (age 84); Indianapolis, Indiana, U.S.
- Education: Vanderbilt University (B.A.); Harvard University (M.A.)
- Occupations: Author, reporter, humorist
- Spouse: Joan Griswold
- Website: royblountjr.com

Roy Alton Blount Jr. (/ˈblʌnt/; born October 4, 1941) is an American writer, speaker, reporter, and humorist.

== Life and career ==
Blount was born in Indianapolis, Indiana, and grew up in Decatur, Georgia. He attended Ponce de Leon Elementary School and graduated from Decatur High School, where he was class president and editor of the school newspaper, The Scribbler. He received the Grantland Rice Journalism Scholarship to study journalism at Vanderbilt University, where he distinguished himself and was Phi Beta Kappa and graduated magna cum laude. He went on to Harvard University, where he received his MA degree. Blount is married to painter Joan Griswold; they reside in New Orleans and western Massachusetts.

Blount was a staff writer and associate editor with Sports Illustrated from 1968 to 1975, and has continued to contribute to the magazine thereafter. During his last few years with the magazine, he authored About Three Bricks Shy of a Load, a chronicle of the 1973 Pittsburgh Steelers season which was released in 1974. The source of the book's title was Craig Hanneman whose endearing description of himself and his teammates after an away victory over the Oakland Raiders was "We’re all about three bricks shy of a load."

In 2002, he narrated The Main Stream, a PBS documentary about the Mississippi River. As of 2025, he is featured regularly as a panelist on the NPR news/comedy quiz show, Wait Wait... Don't Tell Me! He was also a recurring guest on A Prairie Home Companion. In May 2010, he made a cameo appearance on HBO's series Treme about post-Katrina New Orleans.

Blount performs with the Rock Bottom Remainders, a rock band composed entirely of writers.

Blount is also a former president of the Authors Guild. On February 24, 2009, he wrote an op-ed article for The New York Times explaining the Authors Guild's position demanding extra royalties from the text-to-speech functionality of the Amazon Kindle 2. To criticism from the American National Federation of the Blind, he replied that free audio availability of copyright works to the blind is provided for automatically by American copyright laws. To the criticism that the Kindle's functionality is equivalent to parents reading aloud to their children, he said, "the Authors Guild does not expect royalties from anybody doing non-commercial performances of Goodnight Moon. If parents want to send their children off to bed with the voice of Kindle 2, however, it’s another matter."

== Bibliography ==
- About Three Bricks Shy of a Load (1974)
- Crackers: This Whole Many-Angled Thing of Jimmy, More Carters, Ominous Little Animals, Sad Singing Women, My Daddy, and Me (1980, paperback 1998)
- One Fell Soup: or I'm Just a Bug on the Windshield of Life (1982)
- What Men Don't Tell Women (1984)
- Not Exactly What I Had in Mind (1985)
- It Grows on You (1986)
- Soupsongs/Webster's Ark (1987)
- Now, Where Were We? (1988)
- About Three Bricks Shy...and The Load Filled Up (1989)
- First Hubby (1990)
- Camels Are Easy, Comedy's Hard (1991)
- Roy Blount's Book of Southern Humor (1994)
- Be Sweet (1998)
- If Only You Knew How Much I Smell You (with Valerie Shaff, 1998)
- I Am Puppy, Hear Me Yap (with Valerie Shaff, 2000)
- Am I Pig Enough For You Yet? (with Valerie Shaff, 2001)
- Robert E. Lee (2003, Penguin Lives series) ISBN 9780670032204
- I Am the Cat, Don't Forget That: Feline Expressions (2004)
- Feet on the Street: Rambles Around New Orleans (2005)
- Long Time Leaving: Dispatches from Up South (2007)
- Alphabet Juice: The Energies, Gists, and Spirits of Letters, Words, and Combinations Thereof: Their Roots, Bones, Innards, Piths, Pips, and Secret Parts, Tinctures, Tonics, and Essences; With Examples of Their Usage Foul and Savory (2008). Sarah Crichton Books, Farrar, Straus and Giroux. ISBN 0-374-10369-0
- Hail, Hail, Euphoria!: Presenting the Marx Brothers in Duck Soup, the Greatest War Movie Ever Made (2010). It Books. ISBN 0-06-180816-4
- "Alphabetter Juice: The Joy of Text" (2011) Sara Crichton Books (Farrar, Straus and Giroux). ISBN 978-0-374-10370-5
- Hard Listening, an interactive ebook about his participation in a writer/musician band, the Rock Bottom Remainders (Coliloquy, 2013).
- Save Room for Pie: Food Songs and Chewy Ruminations (2016). Sarah Crichton Books, Farrar, Straus and Giroux. ISBN 978-0-374-17520-7
