= Paula Poundstone =

American comedian and commentator (born 1959)

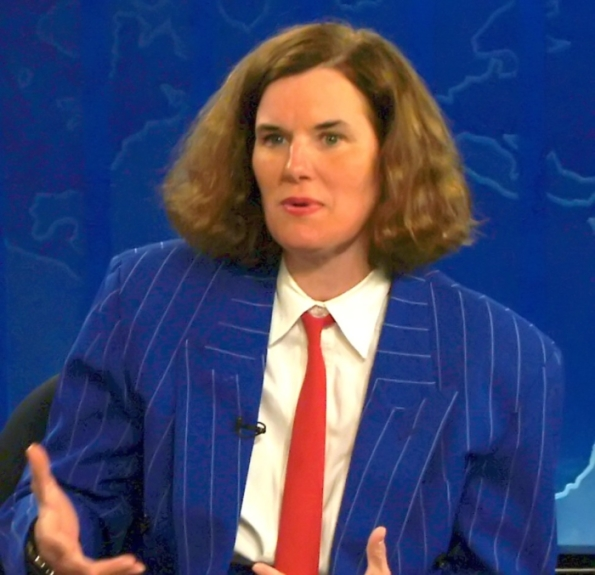
- Poundstone in 2008
- Born: December 29, 1959 (age 66); Huntsville, Alabama, U.S.
- Notable work: Wait Wait... Don't Tell Me!; The Totally Unscientific Study of the Search for Human Happiness; Nobody Listens to Paula Poundstone, the comedy podcast; Cats, Cops and Stuff; Paula Poundstone Goes to Harvard; The French Trump Weekly Press Conference
- Children: 3

Comedy career
- Years active: 1979–present
- Medium: Standup comedy, television, radio, print, internet
- Genres: Standup, improvisational comedy, crowd work, voice acting, commentator, interviewer
- Subject: Observational humor

Paula Poundstone (born December 29, 1959) is an American stand-up comedian, author, actress, interviewer, and commentator. In the late 1980s, she performed the first of several HBO comedy specials. She provided backstage commentary during the 1992 presidential election on The Tonight Show with Jay Leno. She is the host of the podcast Nobody Listens to Paula Poundstone, which is the successor to the National Public Radio program Live from the Poundstone Institute. She is a frequent panelist on NPR's weekly news quiz show Wait Wait... Don't Tell Me, and was a recurring guest on the network's A Prairie Home Companion variety program during Garrison Keillor's years as host.

== Early life ==
Poundstone was born in Huntsville, Alabama, the daughter of Vera, a housewife, and Jack Poundstone, an engineer. Her family moved to Sudbury, Massachusetts, about a month after her birth.

== Career ==
Poundstone started doing stand-up comedy at open-mic nights in Boston in 1979. In the early 1980s, she traveled across the United States by Greyhound bus, stopping in at open-mic nights at comedy clubs en route. She stayed in San Francisco, where she became known for improvisational sets at Holy City Zoo on Clement Street and The Other Café comedy club in Cole Valley.

In 1984, Robin Williams saw her act and encouraged her to move to Los Angeles. She performed her act when Williams hosted an episode of Saturday Night Live. That year, Poundstone was cast in the movie Gremloids. She continued as a comedian and began appearing on several talk shows. In 1989, she won the American Comedy Award for "Best Female Stand-Up Comic".

In 1990, she wrote and starred in an HBO special called Cats, Cops and Stuff, for which she won a CableACE Award, making her the first woman to win the ACE for best Standup Comedy Special. In March 2019, comedian Tig Notaro named Cats, Cops and Stuff one of The 5 Funniest Stand-Up Specials Ever for TIME Magazine. Poundstone went on to another first with her second HBO stand-up special, Paula Poundstone Goes to Harvard, taped on campus in Sanders Theatre. Poundstone had her own Bravo special in 2006 as part of their three-part Funny Girls series, along with Caroline Rhea and Joan Rivers, titled Paula Poundstone: Look What the Cat Dragged In.

Poundstone worked as a political correspondent for The Tonight Show during the 1992 US presidential campaign and did field pieces for The Rosie O'Donnell Show in 1996. In 1993, Poundstone won a second CableACE Award for "Best Program Interviewer" for her HBO series The Paula Poundstone Show. She was then featured in her own variety show, The Paula Poundstone Show, on ABC (which lasted two episodes). She also appeared on Hollywood Squares and was a regular panelist for the remake of To Tell the Truth. Poundstone had a recurring role in Cybill Shepherd's TV series Cybill (1997).

In the mid-1990s, she was featured in a series of instructional, hybrid animation shorts that were called "Another Pointer from Paula Poundstone." These were used as bumpers for PTV Park, a PBS children's programming block that was the precursor to PBS Kids. These were directed by Francesca Rizzo and animated by Gene Mackles.

Poundstone has also worked as a voice actress. She voiced Judge Stone on Science Court (also known as Squigglevision), an edutainment cartoon series done in the Squigglevision style that aired on Saturday mornings, on ABC Kids in 1997.

Staying with the makers of Science Court, Tom Snyder Productions, she was the voice of the mom, Paula Small, in the cartoon series Home Movies for the show's first five episodes, which aired on UPN. Between the show's 1999 UPN cancellation and 2000 revival on Cartoon Network, Poundstone chose to leave the show and was replaced by Janine Ditullio. The show's character, Paula Small, was named after and loosely modeled on Poundstone.

Poundstone is a frequent panelist on National Public Radio (NPR)'s weekly news quiz show, Wait Wait... Don't Tell Me. In 2017, she launched a new science/comedy interview program on NPR called Live from the Poundstone Institute that released episodes weekly, then stopped suddenly, saying “the semester is over”. In July 2018, Poundstone began hosting the information-based comedy podcast Nobody Listens to Paula Poundstone with Adam Felber, who appears on every show.

Poundstone tours the country extensively, performing stand-up comedy in theaters and performing arts centers. She is known for never doing the same act twice and spontaneously interacting with the crowd. Writes Nick Zaino III of the Boston Globe, "Her crowd work has always been unusual—her natural disposition, curious and ever-perplexed, allows Poundstone to aggressively question audience members without ever seeming threatening. And no one does the callback better." She has released three comedy CDs: I Heart Jokes: Paula Tells Them in Boston on April Fools' Day 2013; North by Northwest: Paula Poundstone Live! (her first double album) in June 2016; and I Heart Jokes: Paula Tells Them in Maine in January 2009.

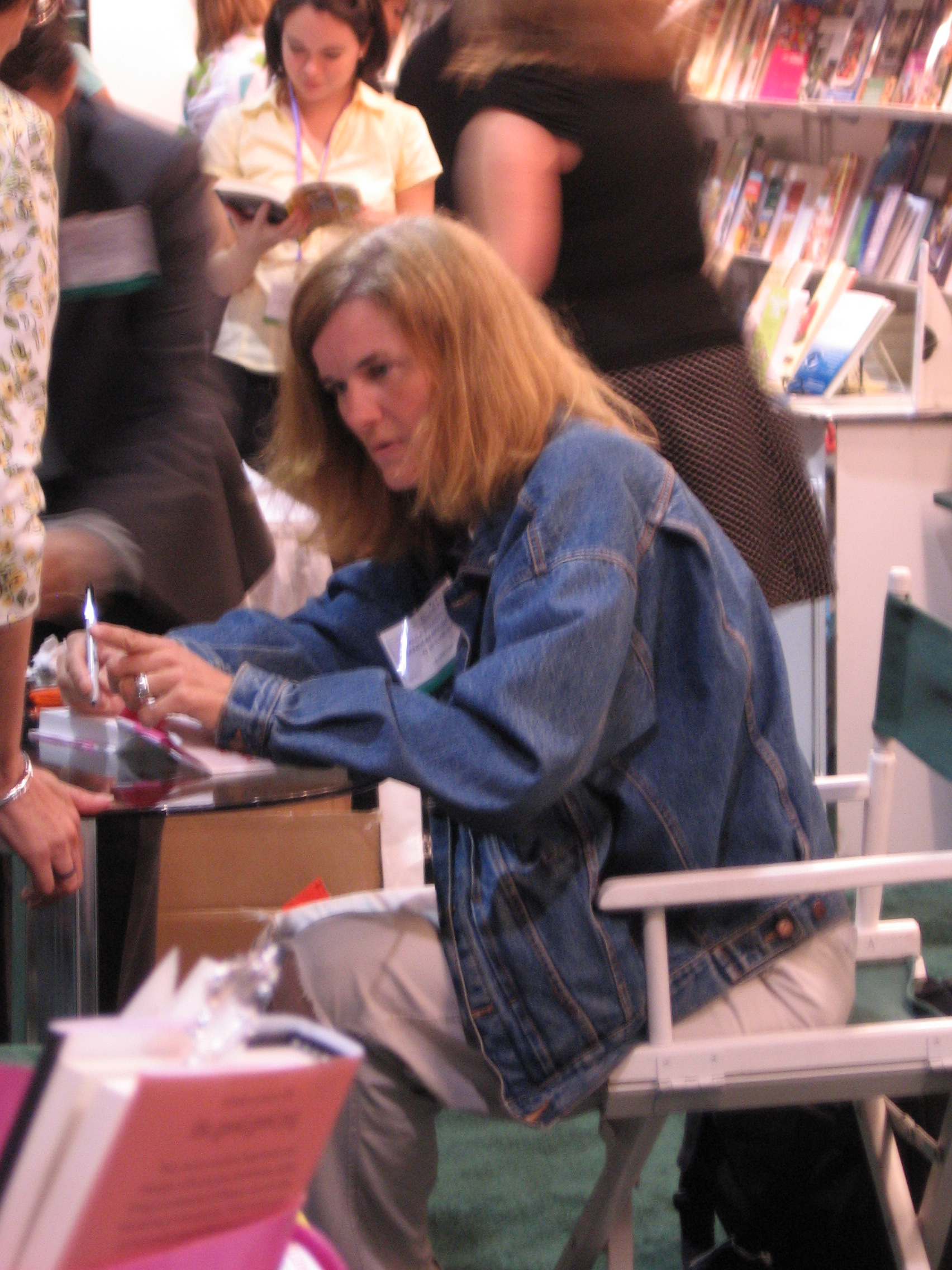
Poundstone at a book signing in 2007

Poundstone's first book, There Is Nothing in This Book That I Meant to Say, was published by Crown in 2006. Her second book, published by Algonquin in May 2017, is titled The Totally Unscientific Study of the Search for Human Happiness. She also wrote the column Hey, Paula! for Mother Jones (1993–1998) and articles for The Los Angeles Times, Glamour, and Entertainment Weekly, among others.

An avid reader, Poundstone has been the National Spokesperson for the American Library Association's "United for Libraries" since 2007. It is a citizens' support group that works to raise funds and awareness for their local libraries.

Poundstone is No. 88 on Comedy Central's 2004 list of the 100 greatest stand-ups of all time.

In 2023, she performed at Comedy Day in San Francisco alongside Marga Gomez.

== Personal life ==
Poundstone began serving as a foster parent in the 1990s. She has fostered eight children, and eventually adopted two daughters and a son.

Poundstone is asexual and an atheist.

In October 2001, Poundstone was charged with felony child endangerment in connection with driving while intoxicated with her children in the car. She was also charged with three counts of lewd acts upon a girl younger than 14. The charge involved inappropriate touching of a 12-year-old girl. In a plea bargain, she changed her earlier plea of not guilty, and in exchange prosecutors asked for the court records to be sealed, dropped three counts of committing lewd acts against a child, and added a misdemeanor count of inflicting injury upon a child. Poundstone also pleaded no contest to one count of felony child endangerment. She was barred from taking in foster children again, sentenced to five years of probation and six months in rehabilitation, and ordered to perform 200 hours of community service, attend Alcoholics Anonymous meetings and a child-abuse program, and receive random drug and alcohol tests.

== Filmography ==
=== Film ===
Year	Title	Role	Notes
1984	Hyperspace	Karen	
1991	Wisecracks	Herself	Documentary
2003	When Stand Up Stood Out	Herself	Documentary
2008	No Brainer	Herself	
2013	Why We Laugh: Funny Women	Herself	Documentary
2013	Wait Wait Don't Tell Me Live!	Herself	Panelist, live cinema
2014	3 Still Standing	Herself	Documentary
2015	Inside Out	Forgetter Paula	Voice
2015	By Any Means Necessary	Herself	Documentary
2016	The Comedy Club	Herself	Documentary
2024	Inside Out 2	Forgetter Paula	Voice

=== Television ===
Year	Title	Role	Notes
1988	Poison	—N/a	Writer, television film
1989	It's Garry Shandling's Show	Herself	Episode: "Save Mr. Peck's, Part 2"
1989	Not Necessarily the News	Commentator	1 episode
1993	Reasonable Doubts	Betty Tannebaum	Episode: "Thank God, It's Friday"
1993	The Paula Poundstone Show	Herself/host	3 episodes
1995	Lois & Clark: The New Adventures of Superman	The Computer	Episode: "Virtually Destroyed"
1996	Adventures from the Book of Virtues	The Djinn	Voice, episode: "Work"
1997	Cybill	Minni Arbogast	2 episodes
1998	Hercules	Armageddon Bow	Voice, episode: "Hercules and the Secret Weapon"
1997-99	Science Court	Judge Stone	Voice, 29 episodes
1999	Home Movies	Paula Small	Voice, 5 episodes
2000-01	To Tell the Truth	Herself	Regular panelist
2013	Wanda Sykes Presents Herlarious	Usher	4 episodes
2015	The HOA	Lorraine	Television film
2016	Major Crimes	Herself	Cameo, Season 5 Episode 4
2019	Summer Camp Island	Paulette	Voice, 4 episodes
2020	The Fungies!	Queen Antagonista	Voice, episode: "The Twins Bug Seth"
2025	Have I Got News for You	Herself	1 episode

=== Comedy specials ===
Year	Title	Studio	Formats
1989	One Night Stand	HBO	Broadcast/streaming
1990	Paula Poundstone: Cats, Cops and Stuff	HBO	Broadcast/streaming
1996	Paula Poundstone Goes to Harvard	HBO	Broadcast
2006	Bravo's Funny Girls - Paula Poundstone: Look What the Cat Dragged In	Bravo	Broadcast/download/streaming

=== Stand-up appearances ===
Year	Title	Notes
1983	The 8th Annual Young Comedians Show	Comedy special
1984	The Merv Griffin Show	1 episode
1987	On Location: Women of the Night	Comedy special, VHS
1981-88	An Evening at the Improv	2 episodes, stand-up compilation VHS/streaming
1989	Comic Relief III	Charity comedy special, VHS
1989	Comic Relief '90	Charity comedy special, VHS
1984-90	Late Night with David Letterman	13 episodes
1986-92	The Tonight Show Starring Johnny Carson	14 episodes
1992	Kellogg's Pop-Tarts Comedy Video	Comedy special VHS
1992	Comic Relief V	Charity comedy special, VHS
1994	Comic Relief VI	Charity comedy special, VHS
1995	Comic Relief VII	Charity comedy special, VHS
1992-97	The Tonight Show with Jay Leno	15 episodes
1997-98	The Rosie O'Donnell Show	4 episodes
1998	Comic Relief 8	Charity comedy special, VHS
2003	Best of the Improv 2	Stand-up compilation VHS
2005	Just for Laughs	1 episode, streaming
2006-15	The Late Late Show with Craig Ferguson	17 episodes
2019	William H. Macy: Comedy Ambassador	Comedy special, streaming
2020	Bring Back Laughs	Charity comedy special, streaming
2025	The Late Show With Stephen Colbert	1 Episode

== Discography ==
=== Comedy albums ===
Year	Title	Label	Formats
2009	I Heart Jokes: Paula Tells Them in Maine	CD Baby/Lipstick Nancy	CD/download/streaming
2013	I Heart Jokes: Paula Tells Them in Boston	CD Baby/Lipstick Nancy	CD/download/streaming
2016	North By Northwest: Paula Poundstone Live! Vol. 1 & 2	HighBridge Audio	2xCD/download/streaming
2021	Paula Poundstone Goes to College (For One Night)	Clown Jewels	download/streaming
2022	Cats, Cops and Stuff	Clown Jewels	download/streaming

=== Singles ===
Year	Title	Label	Formats
2019	Not My Butterfinger	Lipstick Nancy	Download/streaming

=== Compilation appearances ===
Year	Title	Label	Formats
1988	Women of the Night: A Comedy Album	A&M Records	LP/Cassette/CD
1989	The Best Of Comic Relief 3	Rhino Records	Cassette/CD
1990	The Best Of Comic Relief '90	Rhino Records	Cassette/CD
1994	Comic Relief VI	Rhino Records	CD
1996	Comic Relief VII	Rhino Records	CD
2000	A Prairie Home Companion: Pretty Good Jokes	HighBridge Audio	2xCassette/2xCD
2013	Laughter Therapy: A Comedy Collection For The Chronically Serious	NPR/HighBridge Audio	2xCD
2018	Just for Laughs - The Archives, Vol. 36	JFL	CD/download/streaming
2018	Just for Laughs - The Archives, Vol. 60	JFL	CD/download/streaming
2020	Just for Laughs - Select, Vol. 12	JFL	Download/streaming
2021	George Schlatter’s Comedy Club	Clown Jewels	Download/streaming

== Bibliography ==
Year	Title	Publisher	Formats
2006	There's Nothing in This Book That I Meant to Say	Harmony Books	Print: Hardcover/Large Print/Paperback, Audiobook: CD/download/streaming
2017	The Totally Unscientific Study of the Search for Human Happiness	Algonquin Books	Print: Hardcover/Paperback/E-book, Audiobook: CD/download/streaming

== Podcast ==
Paula runs a comedy podcast called Nobody Listens to Paula Poundstone, along with co-host Adam Felber, her manager Bonnie Burns, and her director of marketing, Toni Anita Hull. There is a new expert invited onto the show every week to educate listeners about their subject. There is also a book club before and many different activities after the guest speaks.
