= Peter Sagal =

NPR personality, host of "Wait Wait...Don't Tell Me!" (born 1965)

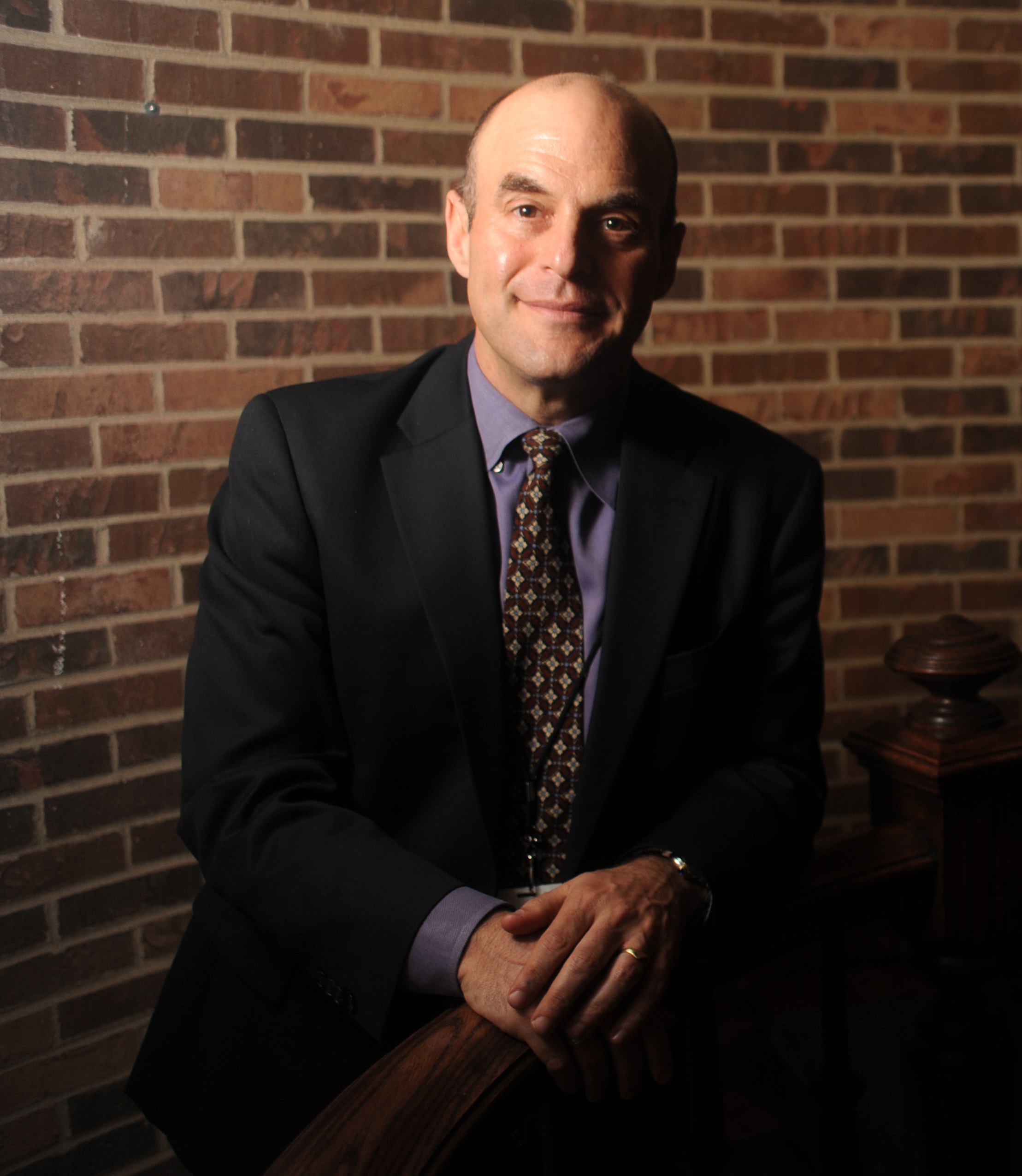
- Sagal in 2012
- Born: January 31, 1965 (age 61); Berkeley Heights, New Jersey, U.S.
- Education: Harvard University (BA)
- Occupations: Humorist, writer, radio host
- Notable credit: Host of Wait Wait... Don't Tell Me!
- Spouses: Beth Albrecht (m. 1994; div. 2013); Mara Filler (m. 2018)
- Children: 5

Peter Daniel Sagal (born January 31, 1965) is an American humorist, writer, and host of the National Public Radio game show Wait Wait... Don't Tell Me! and the PBS special Constitution USA with Peter Sagal.

== Early life, family and education ==
Sagal was raised in a Jewish family in Berkeley Heights, New Jersey, son of Matthew and Reeva Sagal. Matthew was a telecommunications executive, and Reeva was a schoolteacher who became a stay-at-home mother.

Sagal is a 1987 graduate of Harvard College, where one of his college roommates was future Wall Street Journal correspondent Jess M. Bravin. Together, they entered a competition to write the Hasty Pudding production and were selected to develop their script "Between the Sheiks". Sagal studied English literature at Harvard. While there he wrote and directed other student theater productions. He also spent a summer as a journalist for Cycle, a now defunct motorcycle magazine.

== Career ==
After graduating from Harvard, Sagal pursued several different occupations, all connected to the theater or writing. While living in Los Angeles, he appeared as a contestant on the game show Jeopardy! in April 1988, in which he was placed second.

Sagal then moved to New York to pursue a theater writing career. In 1998, he moved to the Chicago area, when he became the host of NPR's Wait Wait... Don't Tell Me! news quiz program.

He was literary manager for the now-defunct Los Angeles Theater Center, a stage director, an actor, a playwright and a screenwriter, and an extra in a Michael Jackson video. He has also been a journalist, an essayist, a humorist, a travel writer, and an author. Sagal has written several plays that have been performed across the United States and internationally. Some have also been performed as radio plays or podcasts.

=== Screenwriter ===
Sagal has written screenplays, one for a 1996 science fiction / martial arts thriller, Savage (1996 film). He received a story credit for Dirty Dancing: Havana Nights, a 2004 sequel to the original Dirty Dancing adapted from his screenplay Cuba Mine. Sagal said his original screenplay bears little resemblance to the poorly-received film.

=== Television writer ===
Sagal has also written for television shows including,

- Wait Wait... Don't Tell Me!: A Royal Pain in the News (TV Movie 2011)
- Wait Wait Don't Tell Me Live! (TV Movie 2013)
- Constitution USA with Peter Sagal (2013)

The two Wait Wait pilots are based on the weekly NPR/WBEZ Chicago news quiz radio program which Sagal hosts.

=== Actor ===
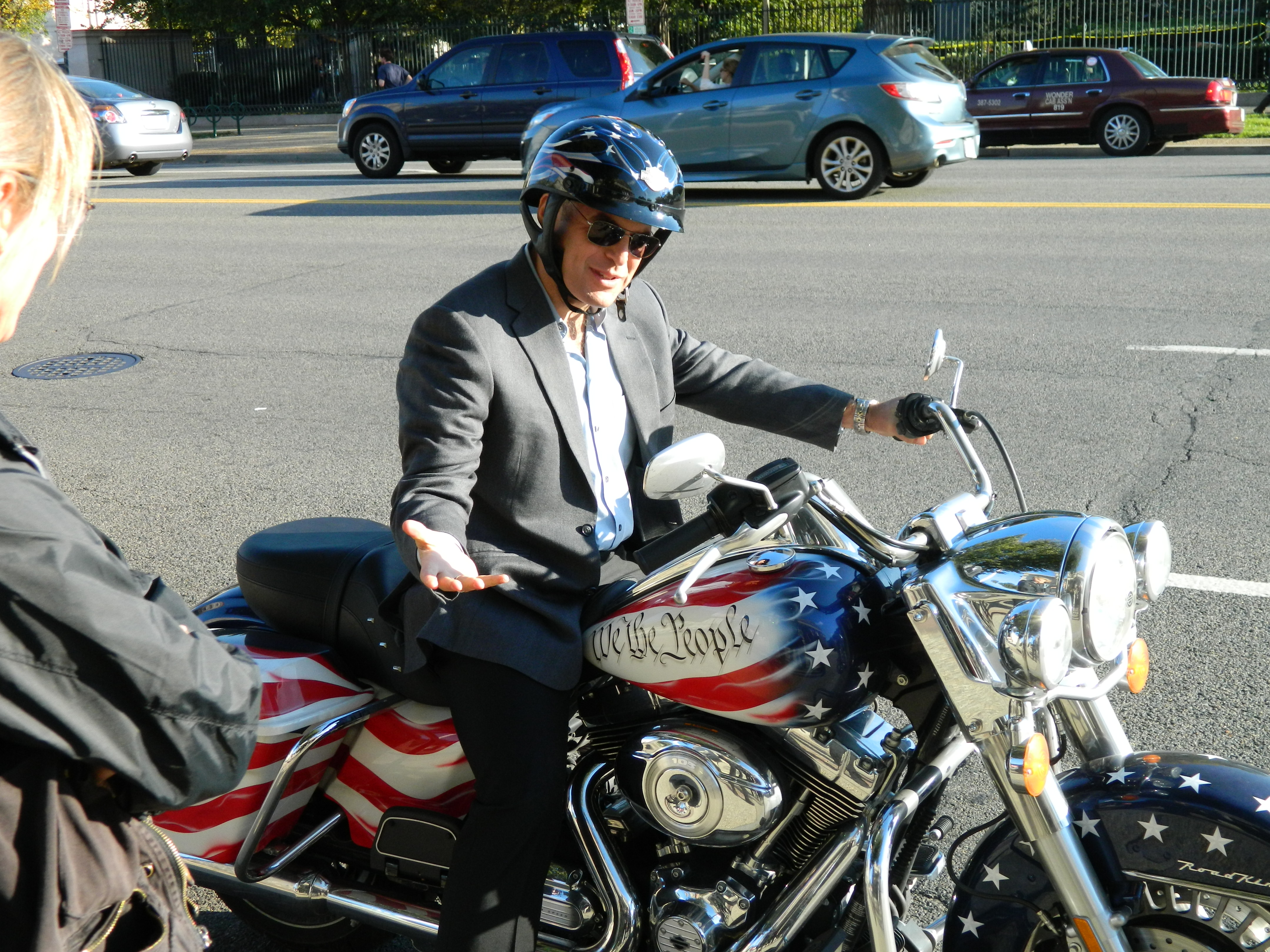
Sagal on his "We the People" Harley Davidson motorcycle at the National Archives during filming for Constitution USA with Peter Sagal

Sagal had a brief voice cameo as Clown's Joy in the 2015 animated movie Inside Out.

He appeared as himself in the "Pay Pal" episode of the animated television series The Simpsons. In that episode characters Lisa and Tumi listened to an episode of Wait Wait... Don't Tell Me! featuring Sagal and announcer Carl Kasell.

Sagal has appeared in three television specials based on his radio show: Wait Wait... Don't Tell Me! (2008), Wait Wait... Don't Tell Me!: A Royal Pain in the News (2011), and Wait Wait Don't Tell Me Live! (2013).

Sagal has appeared as himself in documentaries. These include:

- Constitution USA with Peter Sagal—PBS TV miniseries documentary in 2013
- Narrator of the Baltimore Symphony Orchestra's performance of Leonard Bernstein's operetta Candide
- National Geographic Explorer—TV series documentary (hosted one episode) in 2016
- A Personal Journey Through and To The Constitution—based on the 2013 PBS documentary Constitution USA with Peter Sagal

=== Journalist ===
A runner of marathons, Sagal writes the Road Scholar column for Runner's World magazine. He has also written for The New York Times Magazine, the Chicago Tribune, the Houston Chronicle, and Time magazine.

Sagal and the Wait Wait... Don't Tell Me! team contributed a feature called Sandwich Monday to The Salt, NPR's food blog. For five years, each Monday the Wait Wait team ate a new and different kind of sandwich for lunch. Then one of the team members would write a tongue-in-cheek blog post describing the food. Sandwiches included Fritos-topped Papa John's pizza, latke double-down, Passover Sandwich, and Burger King's YUMBO.

=== Author ===
In the early 1990s while he was living in Minneapolis, Sagal was hired to ghostwrite an autobiography of the 1970s pornography director Gail Palmer. Sagal discovered that Palmer did not direct the pornography movies attributed to her, and that she was a front for her pornographer boyfriend. Sagal wrote the book anyway. However, Palmer did not approve of the manuscript, and it has not been published.

In October 2007 HarperCollins published Sagal's The Book of Vice: Very Naughty Things (and How to Do Them). In the book Sagal revisits the Gail Palmer incident and indicates that his exposure to the porn industry led to his writing Book of Vice. Publishers Weekly called Book of Vice, "a hilarious, harmlessly prurient look at the banality of regular people’s strange and wicked pleasures".

In October 2018 Simon & Schuster published Sagal's memoir The Incomplete Book of Running. In the book Sagal reflects on his journey of becoming a serious runner near the age of 40 and documents his varied experiences in running, including crossing the finish line at the 2013 Boston Marathon moments before the bombing. Donya Currie of the Washington Independent Review of Books wrote of the memoir, "In addition to taking the reader along on some races and training runs, and giving insight into the importance of a supportive running group and good nutrition, Sagal entertains with sprinklings of fascinating research."

=== Awards and honors ===
- The Theater Visions Award for best new play from the Laurie Foundation
- A Drama-Logue Award for directing
- McCord Arts Prize from Harvard University
- The Kurt Vonnegut Humor Award from the Kurt Vonnegut Memorial Library in Indianapolis, Indiana.
- Named one of the top ten Jewish entertainers from New Jersey by New Jersey Jewish News.
- Creativity Award from Moment magazine in 2013.

== Wait Wait... Don't Tell Me! ==
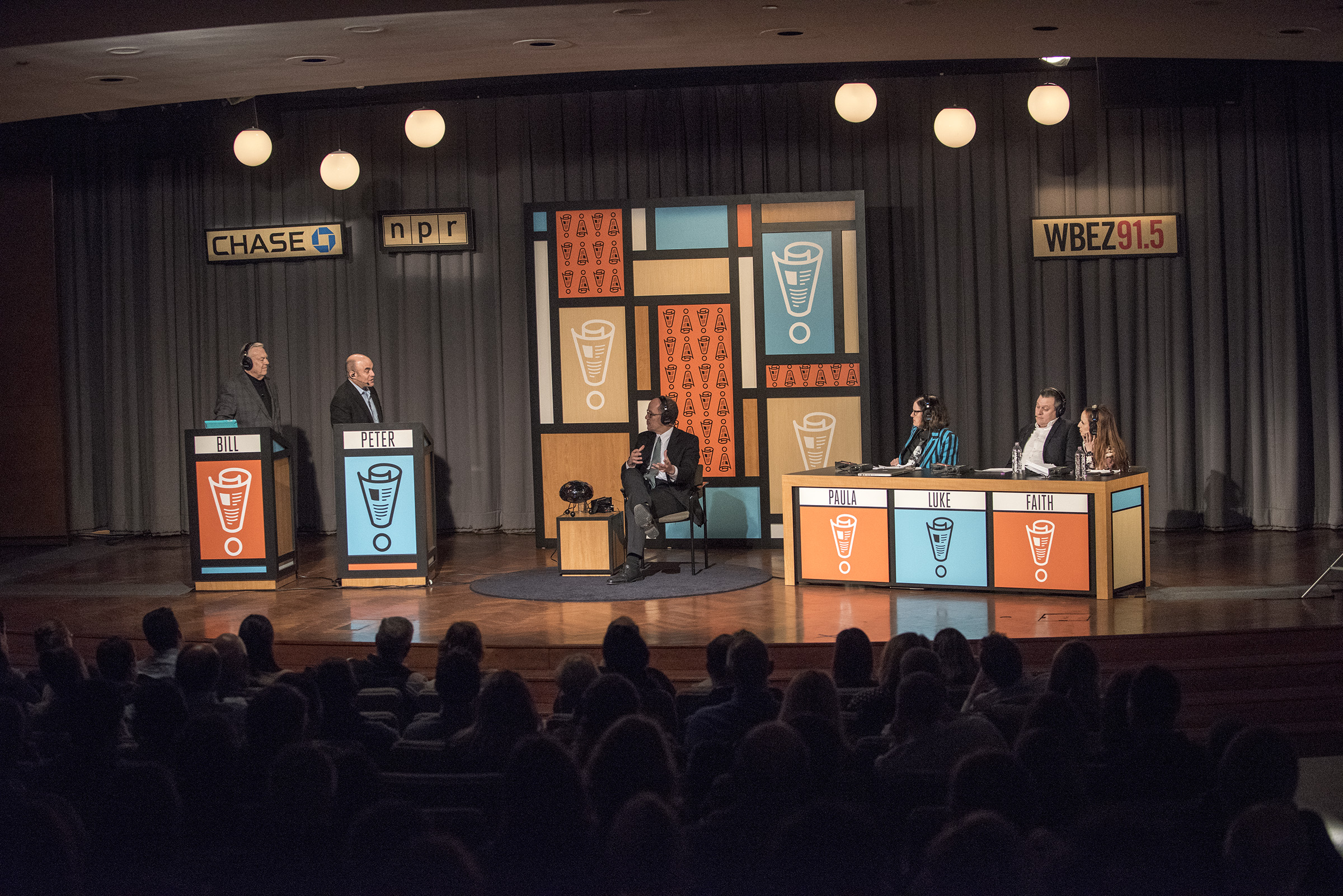
Taping Wait Wait...Don't Tell Me! at the Chase Auditorium in Chicago. Left to right, Bill Kurtis, Peter Sagal, US Secretary of Labor Thomas E. Perez, and panel, Paula Poundstone, Luke Burbank, and Faith Salie.

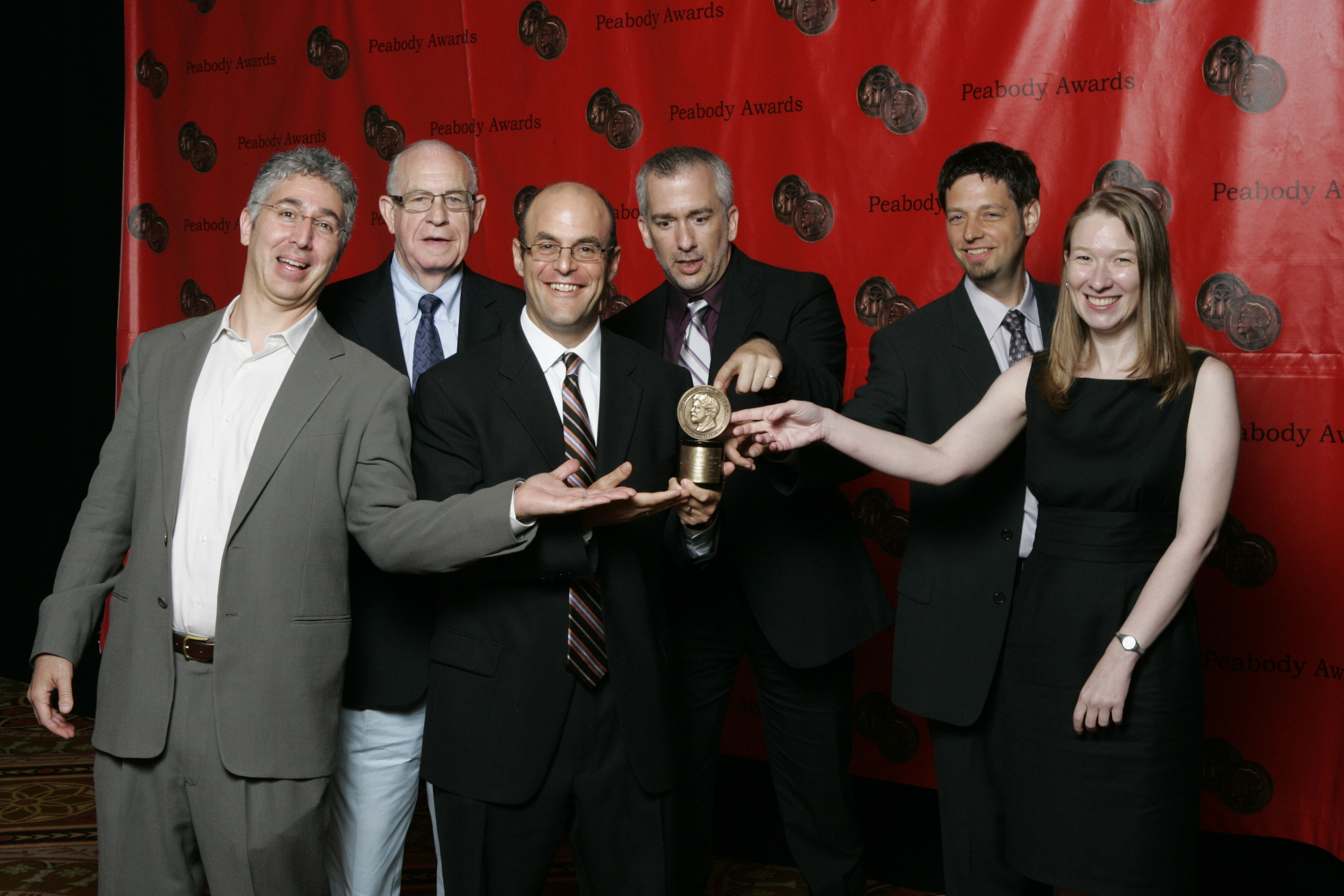
Doug Berman, Carl Kasell, Peter Sagal, Rod Abid, Philipp Goedicke, and Emily Ecton at the 67th Annual Peabody Awards Luncheon in 2008

Wait Wait... Don't Tell Me! was designed as a weekly satirical look at the week's news in a quiz format. The host of the show was to be a comedian named Dan Coffey who would quiz panelists, celebrity guests and non-celebrity callers. The show debuted in January 1998 but had a rocky start. The producers replaced Coffey with Sagal in May 1998.

Wait Wait... Don't Tell Me! has become one of the most popular shows on NPR. The radio program is heard weekly by nearly three million listeners on 520 public radio stations nationwide. The Wait Wait... Don't Tell Me! podcast is also heard by a million people every month. In 2008 Wait Wait... Don't Tell Me! was awarded a 2007 Peabody Award "For offering a droll, light-hearted alternative to both news and the cottage industry of punditry that surrounds it..."

Wait Wait... Don't Tell Me! has not been without controversy. For instance, in December 2014, Sagal attempted a joke about a Diocese of Brooklyn Christmas ad depicting a young woman taking a selfie with a picture of Jesus. He asked why Jesus did not just take the picture for her, and answered "His hands were occupied." Critics including Fox News host Bill O'Reilly and Dallas First Baptist Church senior pastor Robert Jeffress called the joke blasphemous and accused Sagal specifically and the secular media in general of mocking Christianity. O'Reilly stated that if Sagal's comment was salacious he should be fired. When asked about the incident, NPR President and CEO Jarl Mohn said, "[T]he show's goal is to poke fun at the news and make people laugh" and he "regrets that we didn't succeed in this case".

== Personal life ==
Sagal was married from 1994 until his divorce in 2013. In 2018, he married Mara Filler. He has three children from his first marriage and two from his second marriage. Sagal was a longtime resident of the Chicago suburb of Oak Park, Illinois, though he moved to Highland Park, Illinois in 2022.

== See also ==
- Bill Kurtis
