= Roxanne Roberts =

American style writer and radio personality

- Roxanne Roberts after a broadcast of Wait Wait... Don't Tell Me!
- Born: 1954 (age 71–72); Minneapolis, Minnesota, U.S.
- Occupations: Journalist, Radio personality

Roxanne M. Roberts (born 1954 in Minneapolis, Minnesota) is a style writer for The Washington Post. She was co-author of "The Reliable Source" column with Amy Argetsinger, the paper's daily chronicle of Washington D.C.'s notables and society events. She is a regular panelist on the NPR quiz show Wait Wait... Don't Tell Me!.

In 2000, Roberts appeared on the "In" list in Washingtonian magazine.

In 2009, Roberts received some media attention for her role in the gatecrashing incident at the first state dinner under the presidency of Barack Obama. She informed two White House staffers that the Salahis were not on the official guest list, and was apparently the only person who caught the mishap that night. However, her suspicions were not acted on, which furthered the image that the White House staff at the event had handled the situation incompetently.

== Personal ==
Roberts' son is Carter Lockwood, who appeared as a contestant on Jeopardy! starting on February 18, 2022. In 1996 she wrote a piece for the Post about her father, who committed suicide when he was 46 and she was 21.
