= List of Wait Wait... Don't Tell Me! episodes (2025) =

The following is a list of episodes of Wait Wait... Don't Tell Me!, NPR's news panel game, that aired during 2025. All episodes, unless otherwise indicated, feature Peter Sagal as host and Bill Kurtis as announcer/scorekeeper, and originate from the Studebaker Theatre at Chicago's Fine Arts Building. Dates indicated are the episodes' original Saturday air dates, and the job titles and backgrounds of the guests reflect their status and positions at the time of their appearance. On some occasions, member stations alter the episodes for their donation drive breaks, which only impact the show's airing within their broadcast area.

== January ==
Date	Guest	Panelists	Notes
January 4	Unaired segments from previous episodes "Best of 2024" encores featuring actress/singer Renée Elise Goldsberry, rapper Danny Brown, economic historian Claudia Goldin, Top Chef host Kristen Kish, and CBS NFL studio analyst Bill Cowher		
January 11	Actor Josh Gad	Negin Farsad, Rachel Coster, Josh Gondelman	
January 18	Comedian/actress Rose Matafeo	Maz Jobrani, Alzo Slade, Helen Hong	Guest announcer/scorekeeper Chioke I'Anson
January 25	Singer-songwriter/YouTuber mxmtoon	Paula Poundstone, Hari Kondabolu, Faith Salie	Guest announcer/scorekeeper Chioke I'Anson

== February ==
Date	Guest	Panelists	Notes
February 1	Taxidermist Amber Maykut	Adam Felber, Joyelle Nicole Johnson, Rekha Shankar	Guest announcer/scorekeeper Chioke I'Anson
February 8	Actress/comedian Vanessa Bayer	Peter Grosz, Shantira Jackson, Rachel Feinstein	Guest host Tom Papa; Guest announcer/scorekeeper Chioke I'Anson
February 15	Mike Derks & Mike Bishop, members of heavy metal band Gwar	Negin Farsad, Alzo Slade, Adam Burke	Show recorded in Richmond, VA (Altria Theater); Guest announcer/scorekeeper Chioke I'Anson
February 22	Unaired segments from previous episodes "Not My Job" encores featuring actors John Leguizamo & James Marsden, musician Mark Ronson, ultramarathoner Tara Dower, and actor/singer Billy Porter		Guest host Tom Papa; Guest announcer/scorekeeper Chioke I'Anson

== March ==
Date	Guest	Panelists	Notes
March 1	Comedian/actor Roy Wood Jr.	Helen Hong, Paula Poundstone, Tom Bodett	
March 8	Actress Lauren Graham	Faith Salie, Shantira Jackson, Roy Blount Jr.	
March 15	Actress Amanda Seyfried	Emmy Blotnick, Peter Grosz, Fortune Feimster	
March 22	Orlando Magic center Moe Wagner	Eugene Cordero, Paula Poundstone, Alonzo Bodden	Show recorded in Orlando, FL (Walt Disney Theater)
March 29	"Not My Job" encores featuring actress Diane Lane, actor/comedians Eric Idle, Bridget Everett, & Jeff Hiller, and musicians Christian McBride & Kathleen Hanna		

== April ==
Date	Guest	Panelists	Notes
April 5	Actor Sterling K. Brown	Negin Farsad, Josh Gondelman, Tig Notaro	
April 12	Austan Goolsbee, president of the Federal Reserve Bank of Chicago	Shane O'Neill, Rachel Coster, Peter Grosz	
April 19	Comedian/actor Lewis Black	Alonzo Bodden, Adam Burke, Dulcé Sloan	Show recorded in Durham, NC (DPAC)
April 26	Actor Brian Tyree Henry	Negin Farsad, Luke Burbank, Brian Babylon	Guest host Karen Chee

== May ==
Date	Guest	Panelists	Notes
May 3	Actress/writer Natasha Rothwell	Joyelle Nicole Johnson, Peter Grosz, Hari Kondabolu	
May 10	Actor/singer Nathan Lane	Shantira Jackson, Luke Burbank, Roy Blount Jr.	Guest announcer/scorekeeper Alzo Slade
May 17	"Not My Job" encores featuring actor Josh Gad, singer–songwriter/former National Youth Poet Laureate Kara Jackson, musician Mike Derks & Mike Bishop of Gwar, taxidermist Amber Maykut and governor of Michigan Gretchen Whitmer		
May 24	Actress/comedian Ego Nwodim	Tom Papa, Hari Kondabolu, Dulcé Sloan	
May 31	Former Boston Red Sox left fielder/hitter Jim Rice	Maz Jobrani, Joyelle Nicole Johnson, Adam Felber	Show recorded in Boston, MA (Wang Theatre)

== June ==
Date	Guest	Panelists	Notes
June 7	Jeff Gordon, vice-chairman of Hendrick Motorsports and former NASCAR champion	Adam Burke, Negin Farsad, Zach Zimmerman	
June 14	Actor Chris Perfetti	Luke Burbank, Alonzo Bodden, Joyelle Nicole Johnson	Guest host Negin Farsad
June 21	Olympic sabre fencing medalist Ibtihaj Muhammad	Hari Kondabolu, Rachel Coster, Jeff Hiller	
June 28	Actress/singer Anna Kendrick	Paula Poundstone, Karen Chee, Josh Gondelman	Show recorded in Portland, ME (Merrill Auditorium)

== July ==
Date	Guest	Panelists	Notes
July 5	"Not My Job" encores featuring actress Amanda Seyfried & Lauren Graham, comedians Roy Wood Jr. & Jim Gaffigan and singer–songwriter/YouTuber mxmtoon		
July 12	Iowa Hawkeyes women's basketball head coach Jan Jensen	Emmy Blotnick, Hari Kondabolu, Faith Salie	Show recorded in Des Moines, IA (Des Moines Civic Center)
July 19	Filmmaker/producer James Gunn	Bobcat Goldthwaite, Paula Poundstone, Adam Burke	
July 26	Singer–songwriter Laufey	Joyelle Nicole Johnson, Adam Burke, Peter Grosz	

== August ==
Date	Guest	Panelists	Notes
August 2	Television personality Heather Gay	Luke Burbank, Shantira Jackson, Shane O'Neill	Show recorded in Salt Lake City, UT (Abravanel Hall); Guest announcer/scorekeeper Alzo Slade
August 9	Actor Pedro Pascal	Brian Babylon, Negin Farsad, Roy Blount Jr.	Guest host Tom Papa
August 16	Previously unaired segments, including an interview with Atlas Obscura co-founder Dylan Thuras and its current CEO Louise Story "Not My Job" encores featuring comedians Lewis Black & Rose Matafeo and Orlando Magic center Moe Wagner		
August 23	Unaired segments from previous episodes "Not My Job" encores featuring actors Brian Tyree Henry, Nathan Lane & Sterling K. Brown and comedian Vanessa Bayer		
August 30	Actor Paul Giamatti	Mo Rocca, Joyelle Nicole Johnson, Tom Bodett	Show recorded in Lenox, MA (Tanglewood)

== September ==
Date	Guest	Panelists	Notes
September 6	Singer-songwriter/actress Renee Rapp	Shane O'Neill, Amy Dickinson, Alonzo Bodden	
September 13	Sportscaster Bob Costas	Brian Babylon, Emmy Blotnick, Peter Grosz	Guest announcer/scorekeeper Rhymefest
September 20	Sportscaster Chip Caray	Rachel Coster, Adam Felber, Dulcé Sloan	Show recorded in St. Louis, MO (Fox Theatre); Guest announcer/scorekeeper Chioke I'Anson
September 27	Actress Cynthia Nixon	Adam Burke, Negin Farsad, KC Shornima	

== October ==
Date	Guest	Panelists	Notes
October 4	Open water swimmer Rebecca Mann	Shantira Jackson, Adam Felber, Hari Kondabolu	Guest host Negin Farsad
October 11	Ukelele virtuoso/composer Taimane Gardner	Peter Grosz, Joyelle Nicole Johnson, Paula Poundstone	Show recorded in Honolulu, HI (Blaisdell Concert Hall); Guest announcer/scorekeeper Alzo Slade
October 18	Unaired segments from previous episodes "Not My Job" encores featuring NASCAR legend Jeff Gordon, actress/singer Anna Kendrick, and Iowa women's basketball head coach Jan Jensen		
October 25	Bagpipe musician Ally the Piper	Hari Kondabolu, Alex Edelman, Faith Salie	

== November ==
Date	Guest	Panelists	Notes
November 1	Actress/model Julia Fox	Adam Burke, Alonzo Bodden, Josh Gondelman	Guest announcer/scorekeeper Rhymefest
November 8	Chef Roy Choi	Negin Farsad, Karen Chee, Tom Papa	Show recorded in Costa Mesa, CA (Segerstrom Concert Hall); Guest announcer/scorekeeper Alzo Slade
November 15	Comedian/actress Tiffany Haddish	Brian Babylon, Paula Poundstone, Roxanne Roberts	
November 22	Nikki Russ Federman & Joshua Tupper, co-owners of Russ & Daughters	Zach Zimmerman, Joyelle Nicole Johnson, Faith Salie	
November 29	Unaired segments from previous episodes "Not My Job" encores featuring actor Paul Giamatti, singer–songwriter Laufey, Olympic sabre fencing medalist Ibtihaj Muhammad, and filmmaker/producer James Gunn		

== December ==
Date	Guest	Panelists	Notes
December 6	Actor/comedian Andy Richter	Alonzo Bodden, Shantira Jackson, Luke Burbank	Show recorded in Phoenix, AZ (Arizona Financial Theatre); Guest announcer/scorekeeper Alzo Slade
December 13	Singer-songwriter & member of indie rock supergroup boygenius Lucy Dacus	Helen Hong, Adam Burke, Tom Bodett	Guest announcer/scorekeeper Alzo Slade
December 20	Actress Rhea Seehorn	Josh Gondelman, Hari Kondabolu, Paula Poundstone	
December 27	Previously unaired segments, including an interview with surfer Carissa Moore "Not My Job" encores featuring sportscaster Bob Costas and baseball hall of famer Jim Rice		Guest announcer Alzo Slade
