= List of Wait Wait... Don't Tell Me! episodes (2026) =

The following is a list of episodes of Wait Wait... Don't Tell Me!, NPR's news panel game, that aired during 2026. Dates indicated are the episodes' original Saturday air dates, and the job titles and backgrounds of the guests reflect their status and positions at the time of their appearance. On some occasions, member stations alter the episodes for their donation drive breaks, which only impact the show's airing within their broadcast area.

Unless otherwise indicated, all episodes feature Peter Sagal as host, and originate from the Studebaker Theatre at Chicago's Fine Arts Building. Also unless indicated otherwise, episodes thru May 30 featured Bill Kurtis as announcer/scorekeeper. On March 9th, it was announced that Kurtis would retire from the role, ending a 12-year run that began in May 2014, though it was also stated that he would fill in as a guest announcer/scorekeeper when needed in the future. On June 4, Alzo Slade, comedian & recurring Wait! Wait! panelist (as well as a frequent fill-in for Kurtis), was announced as the show's new regular announcer/scorekeeper beginning with the episode of June 6.

== January ==
Date	Guest	Panelists
January 3	Previously unaired segments "Best of 2025" encores featuring actors Pedro Pascal & Chris Perfetti and television personality Heather Gay	
January 10	Actor Delroy Lindo	Joyelle Nicole Johnson, Roy Blount Jr., Paula Poundstone
January 17	Professional boxer/actress Kali Reis	Rachel Coster, Luke Burbank, Hari Kondabolu
January 24	Businessman/actor Kevin O'Leary	Shantira Jackson, Adam Burke, Mo Rocca
January 31	Filmmaker Jon M. Chu	Negin Farsad, Peter Grosz, Annie Rauwerda

== February ==
Date	Guest	Panelists	Notes
February 7	Librarian/media personality Mychal Threets	Tig Notaro, Josh Gondelman, Tom Bodett	
February 14	Actress/singer Arden Cho	Beth Stelling, Paula Poundstone, Tom Papa	Guest host Negin Farsad
February 21	"Not My Job" encores featuring chef Roy Choi, actress Cynthia Nixon, and bagpipe musician Ally Crowley-Duncan		
February 28	Former competitive swimmer & Olympic gold medalist Lilly King	Josh Gondelman, Alonzo Bodden, Faith Salie	Show recorded in Bloomington, IN (Indiana University Auditorium)

== March ==
Date	Guest	Panelists	Notes
March 7	Sportscaster Jason Benetti	Negin Farsad, Luke Burbank, Hari Kondabolu	
March 14	Actor John Cusack	Rachel Coster, Joyelle Nicole Johnson, Adam Burke	Guest announcer/scorekeeper Alzo Slade
March 21	Actor Aasif Mandvi	Shane Torres, Paula Poundstone, Alonzo Bodden	
March 28	D. W. Moffett, actor and chair of the film & television department at SCAD	Shantira Jackson, Joyelle Nicole Johnson, Adam Burke	Guest announcer/scorekeeper Alzo Slade; Show recorded in Savannah, GA (Johnny Mercer Theatre)

== April ==
Date	Guest	Panelists	Notes
April 4	Actress Olivia Munn	Rachel Coster, Peter Grosz, Joyelle Nicole Johnson	Guest host Negin Farsad
April 11	"Not My Job" encores featuring actors Rhea Seehorn & Andy Richter and filmmaker Jon M. Chu		
April 18	Phil Pritchard, Hockey Hall of Fame curator & keeper of the Stanley Cup	Dulcé Sloan, Adam Burke, Alonzo Bodden	Guest announcer/scorekeeper Alzo Slade
April 25	Father James Martin, Jesuit priest and editor-at-large of America	Shantira Jackson, Josh Gondelman, Katie Nolan	Guest host Tom Papa

== May ==
Date	Guest	Panelists	Notes
May 2	Actor/comedian Will Ferrell, appearing as his movie character Ron Burgundy	Paula Poundstone, Eugene Cordero, Alzo Slade	Show recorded in San Diego, CA (San Diego Civic Theatre)
May 9	Songwriter/librettist Robert Lopez	Roxanne Roberts, Mo Rocca, Hari Kondabolu	
May 16	Author and Jeopardy! host Ken Jennings	Faith Salie, Tom Bodett, Joyelle Nicole Johnson	
May 23	Singer/songwriter Brandi Carlile	Paula Poundstone, Negin Farsad, Luke Burbank	Bill Kurtis' final original episode as Wait Wait's regular announcer/scorekeeper
May 30	"Not My Job" encores featuring actress/comedienne Tiffany Haddish, musicians Taimane Gardner & Lucy Dacus, and open water swimmer Rebecca Mann		

== June ==
Date	Guest	Panelists	Notes
June 6	Professional bobsledder Elana Meyers Taylor	Tom Papa, Rachel Coster, Brian Babylon	Show recorded in Austin, TX (Bass Concert Hall); Alzo Slade's first episode as Wait Wait's regular announcer/scorekeeper
June 13	Actor/comedian Robert Smigel	Shane Torres, Shantira Jackson, Josh Gondelman	
June 20	Yesteryear author Caro Claire Burke	Shane O'Neill, Karen Chee, Peter Grosz	
June 27	Stephen Malkmus, lead singer of Pavement	Emmy Blotnick, Joyelle Nicole Johnson, Gianmarco Soresi	

== July ==
Date	Guest	Panelists	Notes
July 4	Previously unaired panel segments "Not My Job" encores featuring actors John Cusack & Aasif Mandvi, actress/singer Arden Cho, and professional boxer/actress Kali Reis		
July 11	Musician Jason Narducy	Adam Burke, Negin Farsad, Alonzo Bodden	Show recorded in Milwaukee, WI (Riverside Theater)
July 18	Musician/songwriter Vicki Peterson	Alonzo Bodden, Helen Hong, Dulcé Sloan	Guest host Tom Papa
July 25	Actor/rapper Tyler James Williams	Hari Kondabolu, Faith Salie, Josh Gondelman	

== August ==
Date	Guest	Panelists	Notes
August 1	Author Mary Roach	Joyelle Nicole Johnson, Shane Torres, Tom Papa	Show recorded in Rohnert Park, CA (Green Music Center)
August 8	Actress Sally Field	Paula Poundstone, Tom Bodett, Shantira Jackson	
August 15	Previously unaired panel segments "Not My Job" encores featuring sportscaster Jason Benetti, librarian Mychal Threets, former competitive swimmer Lilly King, and singer-songwriter/actress Renee Rapp		
August 22	Encore segments including "Not My Job" interviews with author/game show host Ken Jennings, actress Olivia Munn, magazine editor Father James Martin, and songwriter/librettist Robert Lopez		
August 29	Magician/stunt performer Carisa Hendrix	Joyelle Nicole Johnson, Peter Grosz, Tig Notaro	

== September ==
Date	Guest	Panelists	Notes
September 5	Poet/freelance writer Maggie Smith	Shane Torres, Annie Rauwerda, Mo Rocca	Show recorded in Huber Heights, OH (Rose Music Center)
September 12	Comedian/actress Leslie Jones	Peter Grosz, Negin Farsad, Sureni Weerasekera	
September 19	Author/writer Hernan Diaz	Shantira Jackson, Adam Burke, Sam Rocha	
September 26	John Cook, Omaha Supernovas GM and former Nebraska Cornhuskers women's volleyball head coach	Josh Gondelman, Faith Salie, Dulcé Sloan	Show recorded in Omaha, NE (Orpheum Theatre)

== October ==
Date	Guest	Panelists	Notes
October 3	Musician/writer David Byrne	Rob Anderson, Rachel Coster, Alonzo Bodden	
October 10	Singer/songwriter Margo Price	Katie Nolan, Mo Rocca, Joyelle Nicole Johnson	Guest host Negin Farsad
October 17	"Not My Job" encores featuring actors Sally Field & Robert Smigel, writer Caro Claire Burke, and musician Jason Narducy		
October 24	Fashion designer Daniel Vosovic	Rachel Coster, Peter Grosz, Shantira Jackson	Show recorded in Kalamazoo, MI (Miller Auditorium)
October 31	Actor John Turturro	Hari Kondabolu, Paula Poundstone, Faith Salie	Guest host Negin Farsad

== November ==
Date	Guest	Panelists	Notes
November 7	Film director/producer Sterlin Harjo	Adam Felber, Joyelle Nicole Johnson, Brian Babylon	
November 14	Actor/writer Brendan Hunt	Shane O'Neill, Paula Poundstone, Adam Burke	Show recorded in Normal, IL (Bradenburg Auditorium)
November 21	Actor/playwright William Jackson Harper	Tig Notaro, Luke Burbank, Tom Bodett	
November 28	"Not My Job" encores		

== December ==
Date	Guest	Panelists	Notes
December 5	TBA	TBA, TBA, TBA	
December 12	TBA	TBA, TBA, TBA	Show recorded in Providence, RI (Providence Performing Arts Center)
December 19	TBA	TBA, TBA, TBA	
December 26	"Best of 2026" encores		
