= List of Wait Wait... Don't Tell Me! episodes (2024) =

The following is a list of episodes of Wait Wait... Don't Tell Me!, NPR's news panel game, that aired during 2024. All episodes, unless otherwise indicated, feature Peter Sagal as host and Bill Kurtis as announcer/scorekeeper, and originate from the Studebaker Theatre at Chicago's Fine Arts Building. Dates indicated are the episodes' original Saturday air dates, and the job titles and backgrounds of the guests reflect their status and positions at the time of their appearance. On some occasions, member stations alter the episodes for their donation drive breaks, which only impact the show's airing within their broadcast area.

== January ==
| Date | Guest | Panelists | Notes |
|---|---|---|---|
| January 6 | Wait Wait 25th anniversary "best of" episode part 10, with encore segments including interviews with musician Brad Paisley and basketball star Damian Lillard; Previously unaired segments, including interviews with television journalist Bob Woodruff, and news commentator Rachel Maddow | | Guest host Negin Farsad |
| January 13 | Singer-songwriter Jason Isbell | Joyelle Nicole Johnson, Maeve Higgins, Peter Grosz | |
| January 20 | Actor David Oyelowo | Faith Salie, Tom Bodett, Helen Hong | |
| January 27 | United States Secretary of the Treasury Janet Yellen | Shane O'Neill, Dulcé Sloan, Tom Papa | Guest judge/scorekeeper Chioke I'Anson |

== February ==
| Date | Guest | Panelists | Notes |
|---|---|---|---|
| February 3 | Kristen Kish, former chef and host of Season 21 of Top Chef | Brian Babylon, Josh Gondelman, Joyelle Nicole Johnson | Show recorded in Milwaukee, WI (Riverside Theater) |
| February 10 | Actress/producer Lena Waithe | Adam Burke, Negin Farsad, Maz Jobrani | |
| February 17 | Musicians Corin Tucker & Carrie Brownstein of rock band Sleater-Kinney | Amy Dickinson, Hari Kondabolu, Dulcé Sloan | Guest host Tom Papa |
| February 24 | "Best of" episode featuring actors Ray Romano, Rosie Perez, & Nick Kroll, musician Steve Earle, and Vanity Fair magazine editor Radhika Jones | | Guest announcer Chioke I'Anson |

== March ==
| Date | Guest | Panelists | Notes |
|---|---|---|---|
| March 2 | Rapper/singer Danny Brown | Karen Chee, Alzo Slade, Peter Grosz | Show recorded in Austin, TX (Bass Concert Hall) |
| March 9 | Economic historian Claudia Goldin | Josh Gondelman, Maeve Higgins, Roxanne Roberts | |
| March 16 | Actor/comedian David Alan Grier | Adam Burke, Paula Poundstone, Mo Rocca | Guest announcer/scorekeeper Andy Richter |
| March 23 | Business executive and philanthropist Laurene Powell Jobs | Adam Felber, Helen Hong, Hari Kondabolu | |
| March 30 | "Best of" episode featuring actors John Stamos & Gabrielle Dennis, education activist Malala Yousafzai, political consultant David Axelrod, and beatboxer Kaila Mullady | | |

== April ==
| Date | Guest | Panelists | Notes |
|---|---|---|---|
| April 6 | Actor Chris Pine | Emmy Blotnick, Alonzo Bodden, Adam Burke | |
| April 13 | Former Pittsburgh Steelers head coach/CBS NFL studio analyst Bill Cowher | Negin Farsad, Maeve Higgins, Mo Rocca | Show recorded in Pittsburgh, PA (Benedum Center) |
| April 20 | Philosopher/gender studies scholar Judith Butler | Faith Salie, Maz Jobrani, Roy Blount Jr. | Guest announcer/scorekeeper Helen Hong |
| April 27 | Actress/singer Renée Elise Goldsberry | Alonzo Bodden, Shantira Jackson, Jason Isbell | |

== May ==
| Date | Guest | Panelists | Notes |
|---|---|---|---|
| May 4 | Gum wrapper sculptor/animator Lyndon J. Barrois Sr. | Josh Gondelman, Joyelle Nicole Johnson, River Butcher | |
| May 11 | Singer/songwriter Chappell Roan | Tom Papa, Brian Babylon, Meredith Scardino | |
| May 18 | Actress/singer–songwriter Maya Hawke | Faith Salie, Adam Burke, Negin Farsad | Guest host Alzo Slade |
| May 25 | Chef/food writer J. Kenji López-Alt | Jessi Klein, Shantira Jackson, Luke Burbank | Show recorded in Seattle, WA (Paramount Theatre); Guest host Tom Papa |

== June ==
| Date | Guest | Panelists | Notes |
|---|---|---|---|
| June 1 | "Best of" episode featuring musician Bob Seger, actresses Dakota Johnson & Michelle Rodriguez, filmmaker John Wilson, and long-distance runner Molly Seidel | | |
| June 8 | Radio host/comedian Charlamagne tha God | Shane O'Neill, Alzo Slade, Karen Chee | |
| June 15 | Singer/actress Michelle Williams | Alonzo Bodden, Helen Hong, Paula Poundstone | Show recorded at Chicago's Millennium Park (Jay Pritzker Pavilion) |
| June 22 | Disabled adventurer Erik Weihenmayer | Maz Jobrani, Adam Felber, Negin Farsad | |
| June 29 | Bassist/composer Christian McBride | Peter Grosz, Joyelle Nicole Johnson, Dulcé Sloan | Show recorded in Philadelphia, PA (The Mann Center) |

== July ==
| Date | Guest | Panelists | Notes |
|---|---|---|---|
| July 6 | "Best of" episode featuring actors Ellie Kemper, H. Jon Benjamin & Richard E. Grant, director Rian Johnson, and costume designer Ruth E. Carter | | |
| July 13 | Journalists Zach Stafford & Sam Sanders | Paula Poundstone, Emmy Blotnick, Tom Papa | Guest announcer/scorekeeper Chioke I'Anson |
| July 20 | Track & field athlete Allyson Felix | Shantira Jackson, Hari Kondabolu, Roy Blount Jr. | Guest host Karen Chee |
| July 27 | Singer/musician & punk icon Kathleen Hanna | Meredith Scardino, Mo Rocca, Peter Grosz | |

== August ==
| Date | Guest | Panelists | Notes |
|---|---|---|---|
| August 3 | Anthony Fauci, physician/immunologist & former director of NIAID | Negin Farsad, Tom Papa, Karen Chee | Show recorded in Vienna, VA (Wolf Trap); Guest announcer/scorekeeper Chioke I'Anson |
| August 10 | "Best of" episode featuring musicians Jason Isbell & Josh Homme, Broadway actress Patti LuPone, news commentator Rachel Maddow, and author James Patterson | | Guest announcer Chioke I'Anson |
| August 17 | "Best of" episode featuring former U.S. Secretary of State Hillary Clinton and actors Chris Pine, David Oyelowo, Natasha Lyonne & Zazie Beetz | | |
| August 24 | Actress Diane Lane | Adam Burke, Adam Felber, Dulcé Sloan | |
| August 31 | Interior designer Nate Berkus | Bobcat Goldthwait, Joyelle Nicole Johnson, Josh Gondelman | Show recorded in Minneapolis, MN (Orpheum Theatre) |

== September ==
| Date | Guest | Panelists | Notes |
|---|---|---|---|
| September 7 | Comedian/actor John Leguizamo | Tom Bodett, Helen Hong, Hari Kondabolu | |
| September 14 | Comedian Jay Pharoah | Adam Burke, Negin Farsad, Roxanne Roberts | |
| September 21 | Actor Gary Oldman | Karen Chee, Brian Babylon, Peter Grosz | Guest announcer/scorekeeper Ayesha Rascoe |
| September 28 | Singer/actress Dionne Warwick | Shantira Jackson, Paula Poundstone, Josh Gondelman | Show recorded in Kansas City, MO (Municipal Auditorium) |

== October ==
| Date | Guest | Panelists | Notes |
|---|---|---|---|
| October 5 | Kara Jackson, singer/songwriter & former National Youth Poet Laureate | Joyelle Nicole Johnson, Scaachi Koul, Alzo Slade | |
| October 12 | Actor/comedian Eric Idle | Eugene Cordero, Shane O'Neill, Negin Farsad | |
| October 19 | "Best of" episode featuring actor David Alan Grier, chef/food writer J. Kenji López-Alt, singer–songwriter Chappell Roan, and U.S. Treasury Secretary Janet Yellen | | |
| October 26 | Former professional women's basketball star Sue Bird & former women's soccer star Megan Rapinoe | Alonzo Bodden, Adam Burke, Helen Hong | Guest host Dulcé Sloan |

== November ==
| Date | Guest | Panelists | Notes |
|---|---|---|---|
| November 2 | Actor/comedian Brian Jordan Alvarez | Luke Burbank, Emmy Blotnick, Brian Babylon | |
| November 9 | Ultrarunner Tara Dower | Negin Farsad, Faith Salie, Peter Grosz | Guest announcer/scorekeeper Joshua Johnson |
| November 16 | Governor of Michigan Gretchen Whitmer | Hari Kondabolu, Roxanne Roberts, Josh Gondelman | Show recorded in Detroit, MI (Fox Theatre) |
| November 23 | Actor/comedians Jeff Hiller & Bridget Everett | Joyelle Nicole Johnson, Maz Jobrani, Tom Papa | Guest announcer/scorekeeper Tim Meadows |
| November 30 | Previously unaired segments, including an interview with weightlifter Mary Theisen-Lappen; Encore segments featuring disabled adventurer Erik Weihenmayer, actress/singer–songwriter Maya Hawke and gum wrapper sculptor/animator Lyndon J. Barrois Sr. | | |

== December ==
| Date | Guest | Panelists | Notes |
|---|---|---|---|
| December 7 | Comedian/actor Jim Gaffigan | Negin Farsad, Adam Felber, Adam Burke | |
| December 14 | U.S. Supreme Court Associate Justice Ketanji Brown Jackson | Paula Poundstone, Mo Rocca, Joyelle Nicole Johnson | Show recorded in New York City, NY (Carnegie Hall) |
| December 21 | Actor/filmmaker Ben Falcone and actress Melissa McCarthy | Dulcé Sloan, Roy Blount Jr., Hari Kondabolu | |
| December 28 | "Best of 2024" episode featuring singer/actress Dionne Warwick, actor Gary Oldman, comedian Jay Pharoah, track & field athlete Allyson Felix, and interior designer Nate Berkus | | Guest announcer Tim Meadows |
