= Emma Choi =

American writer

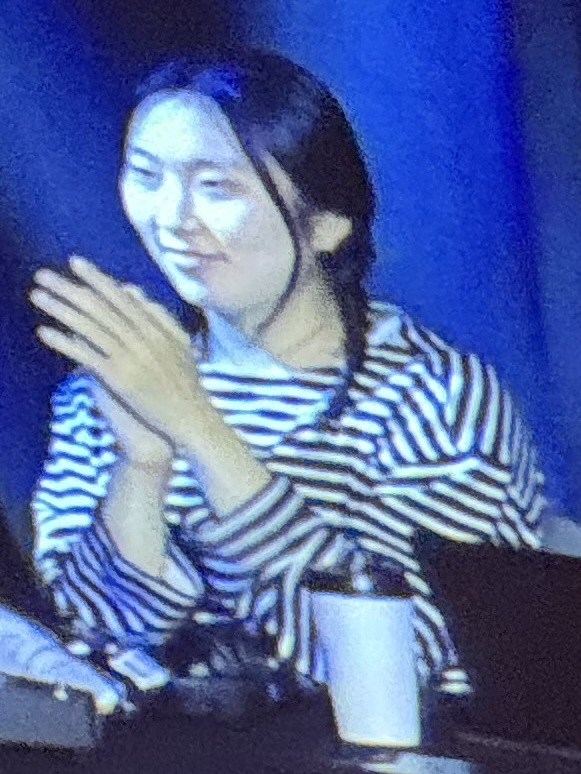
- Choi in 2025
- Born: 2000 (age 25–26)
- Education: Harvard University
- Website: emmaeunjoochoi.com

Emma Eun-joo (은주) Choi (born c. 2000) is an American author, radio host, podcaster, and comedian. She was host of the NPR podcast Everyone & Their Mom and has worked for the NPR show Wait Wait … Don't Tell Me! She is the youngest person to serve as an NPR host.

Choi is a second-generation Korean-American who grew up in Vienna, Virginia. She attended George C. Marshall High School, where she started an online satirical magazine called the Scuttlebutt. Choi studied English literature at Harvard University, graduating in 2022. At Harvard, she was president of an improv troupe, but left after she came under fire for her public criticism of the Harvard Lampoon. She later said "It made me realize everything about being a woman of color in comedy is true, and worse than people say."

In 2021, she became an intern on Wait Wait … Don't Tell Me! She is credited with revitalizing their Instagram account. In February 2022, she became host of Wait Wait spinoff podcast Everyone & Their Mom. That show was cancelled in March 2023 due to a $30 million budget shortfall at NPR. In 2025, Choi was announced to be a performer on the second season of the panel show Smartypants, on Dropout. She continues on the staff of Wait Wait, hosting content on social media.
