= Comedy Knockout =

American game show TV series

- Genre: Standup comedy
- Starring: Damien Lemon
- Country of origin: United States
- Original language: English
- No. of seasons: 3
- No. of episodes: 83

Production
- Running time: 30 minutes
- Production companies: 3 Arts Entertainment; Boontown Productions; Embassy Row

Original release
- Network: TruTV
- Release: April 21, 2016 – November 21, 2018

Comedy Knockout is an American standup comedy game show television series. The show debuted on April 21, 2016. It is currently airing on truTV. In the show, which is hosted by Damien Lemon, the contestants attempt to win points with stand up comedy based on audience reaction. A frequent theme is roasting.
