= Zach Zimmerman =

American comedian and writer (born 1988 or 1989)

Zach Zimmerman (born 1988 or 1989) is an American comedian and writer.

His work often touches on autobiographical aspects of queer identity and growing up in a Southern Baptist household. His humor writing has appeared in The New Yorker, The Washington Post and Timothy McSweeney's Quarterly Concern.

== Early life ==
Zimmerman was born in Roanoke, Virginia, the son of a Southern Baptist preacher and steakhouse manager. He graduated from William Fleming High School in 2006.

The first of his family to go to college, he attended Princeton University, where he was a member of the Princeton Triangle Club theater group. He graduated in 2010 with a Bachelor of Arts degree in religion.

== Career ==
After graduating, Zimmerman moved to Chicago, where he began performing with The Second City, IO Theater, and Peoples Improv Theater and worked at an LGBTQ community center. In 2017, he mounted a comedic walking tour titled "The Twink on the Fire Escape", visiting sites throughout Chicago's Lakeview neighborhood where he went on a series of ill-fated dates.

Later that year, he moved to New York City, working in advertising as well as comedy. His eventual disenchantment with a corporate career inspired him to pursue comedy full time.

In 2019, Zimmerman was named one of Time Out New York's "comedians to watch", alongside Ayo Edebiri and Rachel Sennott. That year, he performed the show Clean Comedy at the Edinburgh Festival Fringe, detailing aspects of being raised by religious parents and coming out.

In March 2022, a clip from Zimmerman's crowd work at the Comedy Cellar in Manhattan went viral on social media when an audience member came out to the friend with whom she attended the show. That October, Zimmerman performed a set on The Late Late Show with James Corden, his late-night debut.

In 2023, Chronicle Books published Zimmerman's Is It Hot in Here (Or Am I Suffering for All Eternity for the Sins I Committed on Earth)?, a collection of essays and humor pieces on his upbringing and personal journey. The book was optioned by Sony Pictures Television.

That year, Zimmerman was included on Vulture's list of "comedians you should and will know", which described his style as "wicked yet warmly generous", and appeared on Watch What Happens Live with Andy Cohen.

With Jay Jurden, Zimmerman is the host of the biweekly Brooklyn comedy show Pretty Major, presented by Vulture.

== Personal life ==
Zimmerman lives in Brooklyn. He identifies as a "queer, vegetarian, atheist socialist."
