= Joyelle Nicole Johnson =

American comedian, writer, and actress (born 1981)

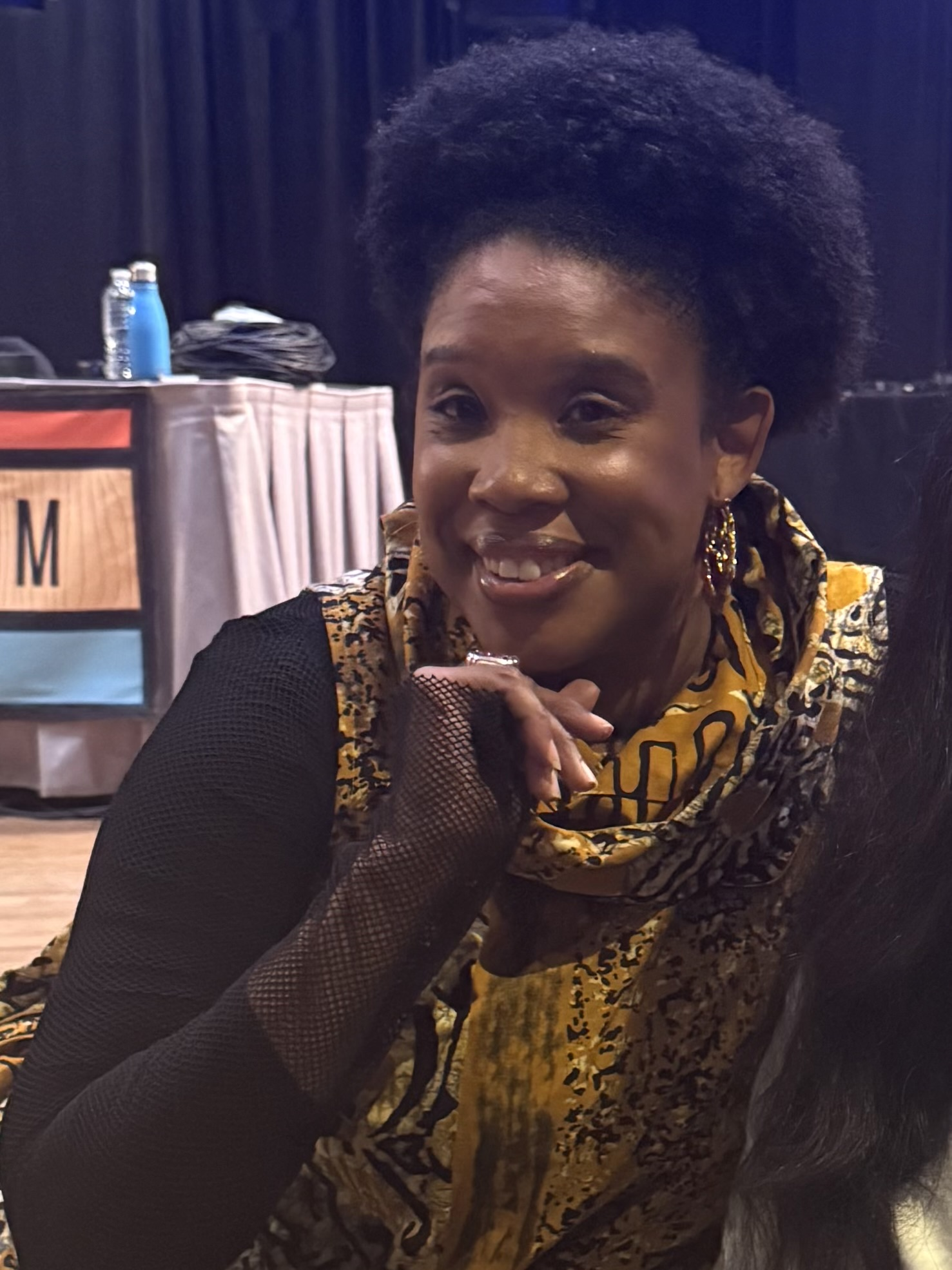
- Johnson in 2025
- Born: 1981 (age 44–45); New Jersey, United States
- Education: Boston College
- Occupations: Comedian; writer; actress
- Years active: 2006–present
- Website: www.joyellenicole.com

Joyelle Nicole Johnson (born 1981) is an American comedian, writer, and actress. Johnson has written for the series Broad City and Pause with Sam Jay. She is also an abortion rights advocate. In 2021 she released her debut stand-up album YellJoy, and her debut televised special Love Joy was released on Peacock.

== Career ==
Johnson began performing stand-up in 2006. She described her comedy as "autobiographical" and frequently pulls from events in her own life to discuss topics like relationships, family, and therapy. She named Gina Yashere and Michelle Buteau as two of her favorite comedians and close friends. She performed on Late Night with Seth Meyers and on the web series LMAOF for OnlyFans.

She has had roles on Crashing, Search Party, and Flatbush Misdemeanors. Johnson has appeared on Pause with Sam Jay and worked as the warm-up comic for Patriot Act with Hasan Minhaj. In 2020 she was named to Vulture's list of "20 Comedians You Should and Will Know."

Johnson performed on The Tonight Show Starring Jimmy Fallon for the second time in 2021. That year, she also released her debut comedy album YellJoy on Juneteenth. The album, produced by Blonde Medicine, is a compilation of sets she performed at The Comedy Cellar and The Village Underground over a few years. Laurie Fanelli of Rebellious Magazine reviewed Yell Joy positively: "Each track further demonstrates Johnson’s unique talent for converting what would, for most of us, be aggravating scenarios into comedy gold."

She released Love Joy, her first stand-up special in November 2021 on Peacock, with Jimmy Fallon and Seth Meyers as executive producers. The special was filmed at The Bell House on Johnson's 40th birthday. In a positive review, Clare Martin of Paste described the special as "clearly meticulously crafted, from her pacing to her word choice, but she delivers every line with incredible ease. It’s like watching a ballerina gliding across a stage en pointe; she makes it look effortless despite all the practice required."

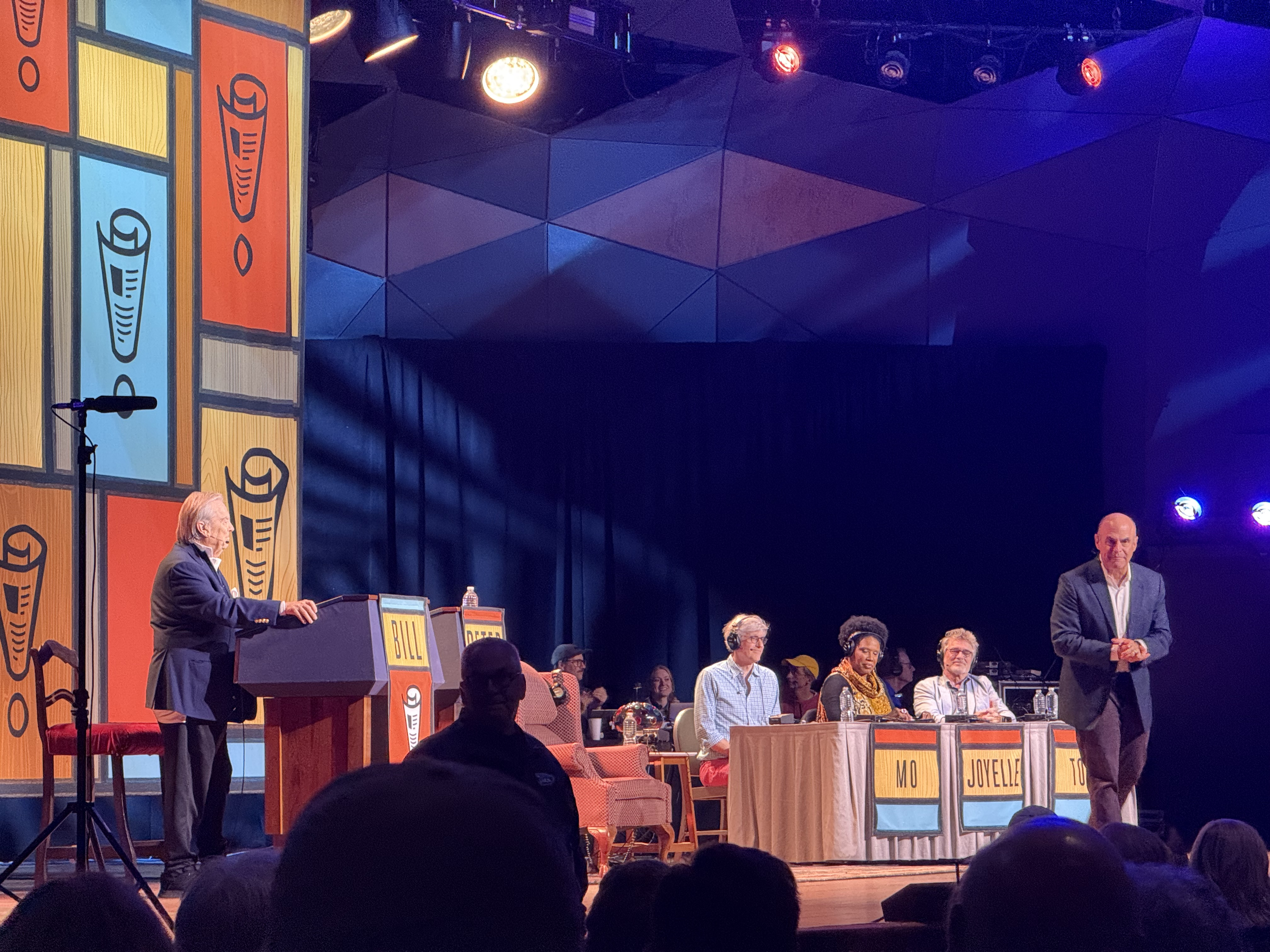
Johnson as a panelist on Wait Wait... Don't Tell Me!

Johnson joined NPR's Wait Wait... Don't Tell Me! as a panelist in 2023. In 2025, she appeared on Celebrity Family Feud.

Johnson is an abortion rights advocate. She tours with Lizz Winstead's Abortion Access Front to educate the public about reproductive rights and raise money for clinic workers. In 2024 she hosted the Brigid Alliance gala, which helps provide travel funding for abortions.

She will act in the upcoming debut feature film Regulars by writer-director Tessa Greenberg.

== Personal life ==
Johnson was born and raised in New Jersey. She received her bachelor's degree from Boston College.

== Accolades ==
- 2022 – Nominee, Critics Choice Award for Best Comedy Special (for Love Joy)
- 2023 – Nominee, Writers Guild of America Award for Television: Comedy/Variety Sketch Series (for Pause with Sam Jay)
