= Dulcé Sloan =

American comedian and actor (born 1983)

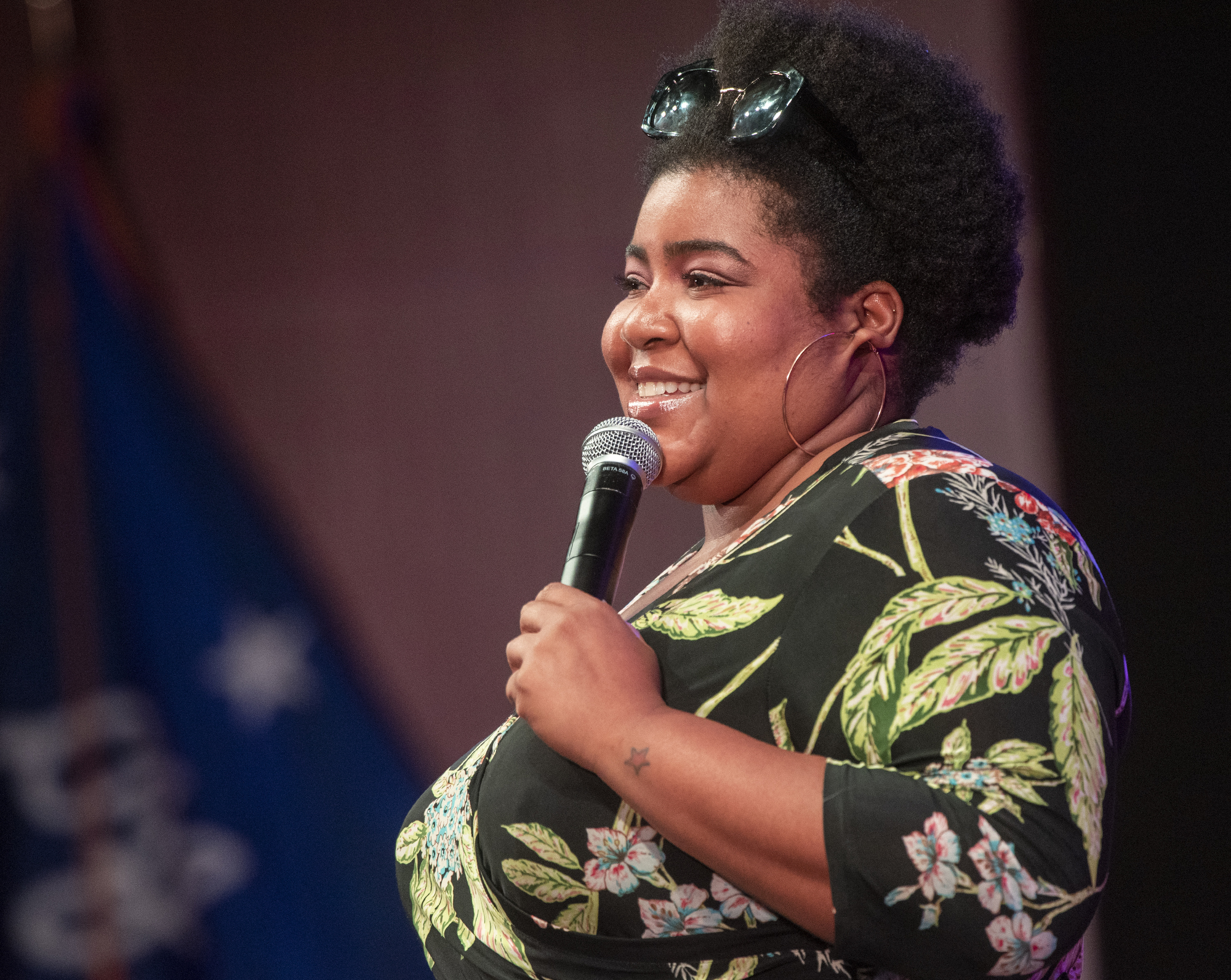
- Sloan in 2019
- Born: July 4, 1983 (age 43); Miami, Florida, U.S.
- Education: Brenau University (BA)
- Occupations: Actor; comedian
- Years active: 2001–present

Dulcé Sloan (born July 4, 1983) is an American stand-up comedian and actor. She is a former senior correspondent and rotating host for The Daily Show on Comedy Central. Sloan voiced Honeybee in the Fox animated sitcom The Great North.

== Early life and education ==
Sloan was born in Miami, Florida, and spent most of her childhood in Atlanta, Georgia, and Miami. She graduated from Meadowcreek High School in Georgia in 2001.

Sloan attended Brenau University and earned a Bachelor of Arts in Theatre Performance. She minored in Spanish. She was a member of Alpha Psi Omega.

== Career ==
Sloan started performing stand-up comedy in May 2009 after being encouraged by friends who worked at the Funny Farm Comedy Club.

In 2015, she was named a "New Face of Comedy" at the Just For Laughs comedy festival and won the 12th annual StandUp NBC comedy showcase. Her late-night comedy debut followed on Conan in February 2016. A few months later, she won the 2016 Big Sky Comedy Festival in Billings, Montana. Additional TV appearances followed on Comedy Knockout, The Steve Harvey Show, @midnight, and as a correspondent for E! News Daily. Sloan joined The Daily Show as a correspondent in September 2017. Her Comedy Central Stand-Up Presents episode aired in October 2019. She co-hosted the Central Time Zone hour of CNN's New Year's Eve Live along with Don Lemon in 2021.

Sloan is the voice of Honeybee in the Fox animated sitcom The Great North and has been a panelist on the radio show Wait Wait... Don't Tell Me!.

She hosts a weekly podcast called Chasing K-Dramas which dissects popular Korean dramas episode by episode with her friend Chrissy Choi.

== Personal life ==
Sloan is the niece of musician Stevie B.

== Filmography ==
=== Film ===
Year	Title	Role	Notes
2010	Baby Mama's Club	Mean Babysitter	
2020	Chick Fight	Charleen	
2025	The Long Shot	Roberta Solomon	

=== Television ===
Year	Title	Role	Notes
2016	Conan	Self	Episode #843
2016	Comedy Knockout	Self	Episode "Hold Me Back"
2016	Acting Out	Self	Episode #1.4
2016	The Steve Harvey Show	Self	Episode #5.52
2017–2025	The Daily Show	Correspondent/Host	
2017	@midnight with Chris Hardwick	Self	Episode #4.103
2017	Type A	Wolf	Pilot
2018	Comedy Up Late	Self	Episode #6.5
2018	Last Call with Carson Daly	Self	
2018	Inside Jokes	Self	Episode #1.05
2018	This Week at the Comedy Cellar	Self	Episode #1.07
2019	Comedy Central Stand-Up Presents	Self	Episode #303
2019	Lights Out with David Spade	Self	Episode #1.29
2019	Conan	Self	Episode #1301
2021	Late Night with Seth Meyers	Self	Episode #1132A
2021–2025	The Great North	Honeybee Shaw–Tobin (voice)	
2021	Adorableness	Herself	Panelist
2022	RuPaul's Drag Race	Herself	Special guest judge
2022	Would I Lie to You?	Herself	Episode: "Newman's Piggyback Ride"
2023	The Daily Show	Guest host	Episode: May 1
2023	The Great American Joke-Off	Host	
2024	Dinner Time Live	Herself	Episode: "Dessert for Dinner"
2025	Prep & Landing: The Snowball Protocol	Janice (voice)	Television special
2026	Crowd Control	Herself	Episode: "Everybody Pregnant"

== Awards and honors ==
- 2015: Just for Laughs New Faces of Comedy
- 2015: Stand-Up NBC comedy showcase winner
- 2016: Big Sky Comedy Festival winner
- 2017: Rolling Stone 10 Comedians You Need to Know
- 2017: Brenau University Alumni Hall of Fame
- 2018: Variety 10 Comics to Watch
- 2024: Primetime Emmy Award for Outstanding Talk Series as host of The Daily Show
