= Ally the Piper =

American musician and bagpiper

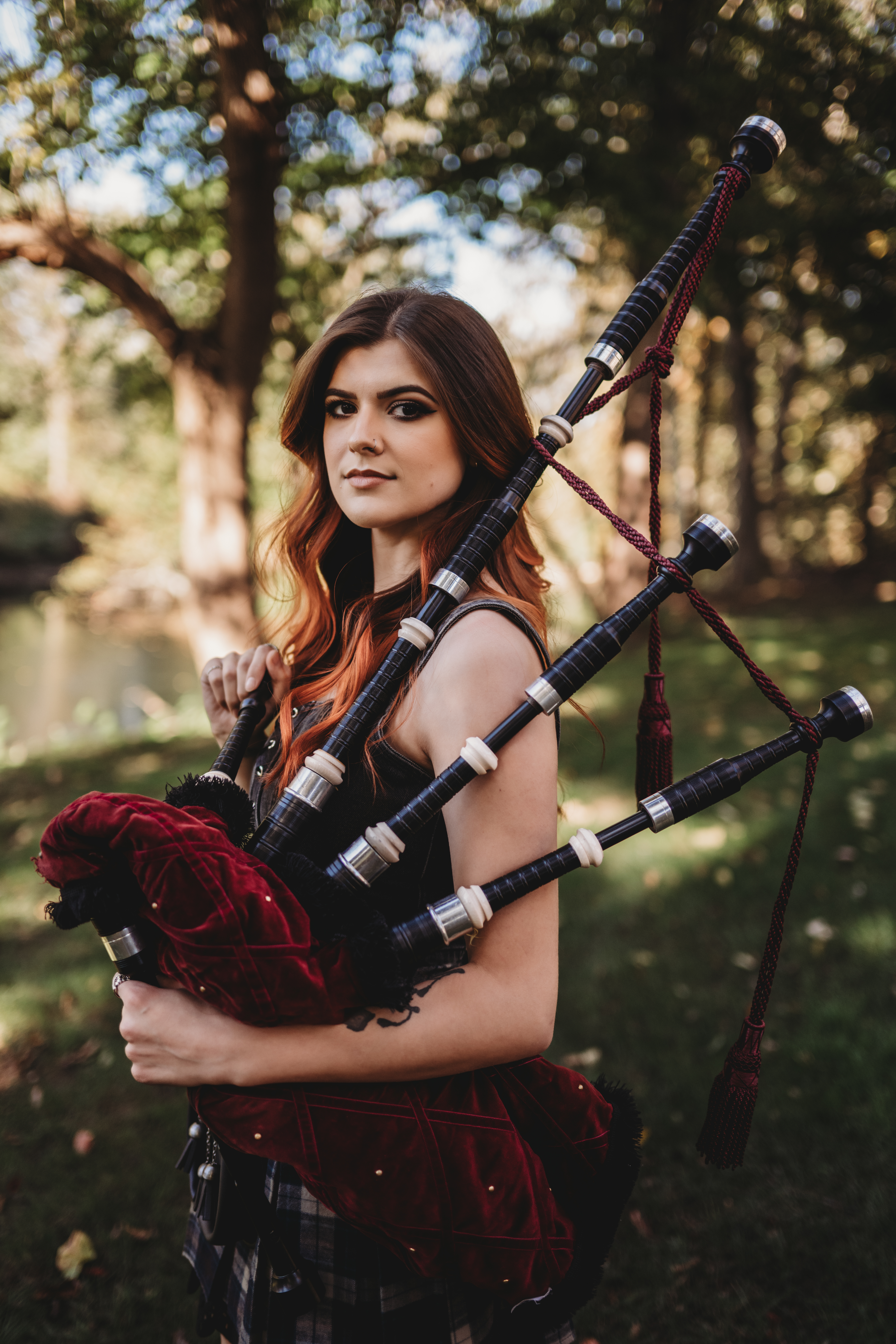
- Crowley-Duncan in 2024
- Born: Ally Crowley-Duncan; 1995 (age 30–31); Latham, New York
- Education: Edinboro University, BA
- Occupations: Musician, bagpiper, social media influencer
- Website: piperally.com

Ally Crowley-Duncan (born 1995), known professionally as Ally the Piper, is an American musician, bagpiper, and social media personality. She is known for playing songs from rock, pop, and metal music on the bagpipes. Her videos gained attention on social media, attracting millions of followers on platforms such as TikTok, Instagram, and Facebook. She is touted as being "The World's Most Famous Bagpiper" due to her large online reach, and impacts in her field.

== Biography ==
=== Early life and education ===
Crowley-Duncan was born in 1995 in Latham, New York. She graduated with a bachelor of arts in music from Edinboro University in 2017.

She developed an early interest in music, learning to play piano, flute, saxophone, and clarinet. Her stepfather's Scottish heritage played a significant role in shaping her musical interests, leading her to develop a fascination with the bagpipes at age 12.

That same year, Crowley-Duncan saw a bagpipe band perform at a parade in New York, which further solidified her passion for the instrument. She began taking bagpipe lessons at 14 and later competed several times in the World Pipe Band Championships in Scotland, where her band took first place in the grade Novice-Juvenile.

She previously played with the Stuart Highlanders pipe band.

=== Music career ===
Crowley-Duncan music career grew during the COVID-19 pandemic when she started posting videos of her bagpipe covers on social media, including TikTok, Facebook, and YouTube.

In 2023, she reached 1 million followers on TikTok, gaining attention for her covers of rock and pop songs such as Metallica's "Enter Sandman" and Avicii's "Wake Me Up."

She blends traditional bagpipe music with modern styles, which helped her gain followers from various music communities, including rock fans. Bands like Metallica and Iron Maiden have praised her work.

Crowley-Duncan has collaborated with other musicians and entities, such as performing a halftime show for the Indianapolis Colts football team, releasing music with Dr. Peacock, and Miracle of Sound. She has also worked with USA Kilts.

She has been recognized for bringing bagpipes into mainstream music. Her online covers have received praise from fans and bands, and Scottish communities have supported her efforts to represent the instrument.

== Discography ==
Title	Type	Year
The Session	Album	2025
"Trip to Scotland"	Single	2024
"Magdalena"	Single	2023
The Viral Hits	Album	2023
"The Crazy Train"	Single	2023
The Pipes are Calling	Album	2022
Billow and Breeze	Extended play	2021
