= Rachel Coster =

American comedian (born 1995 or 1996)

- Born: 1995 or 1996 (age 30–31)
- Education: Northeastern University
- Occupation: Comedian
- Website: rachelcoster.com

Rachel Coster (born 1995 or 1996) is an American comedian.

== Life and career ==
Coster graduated from Northeastern University. In March 2024, she debuted the web series Boy Room where she visits and pokes fun at the untidy apartments of young men living in New York City. The show went viral and gained over 300,000 followers across TikTok and Instagram within a year.
