= Josh Gondelman =

American writer and comedian

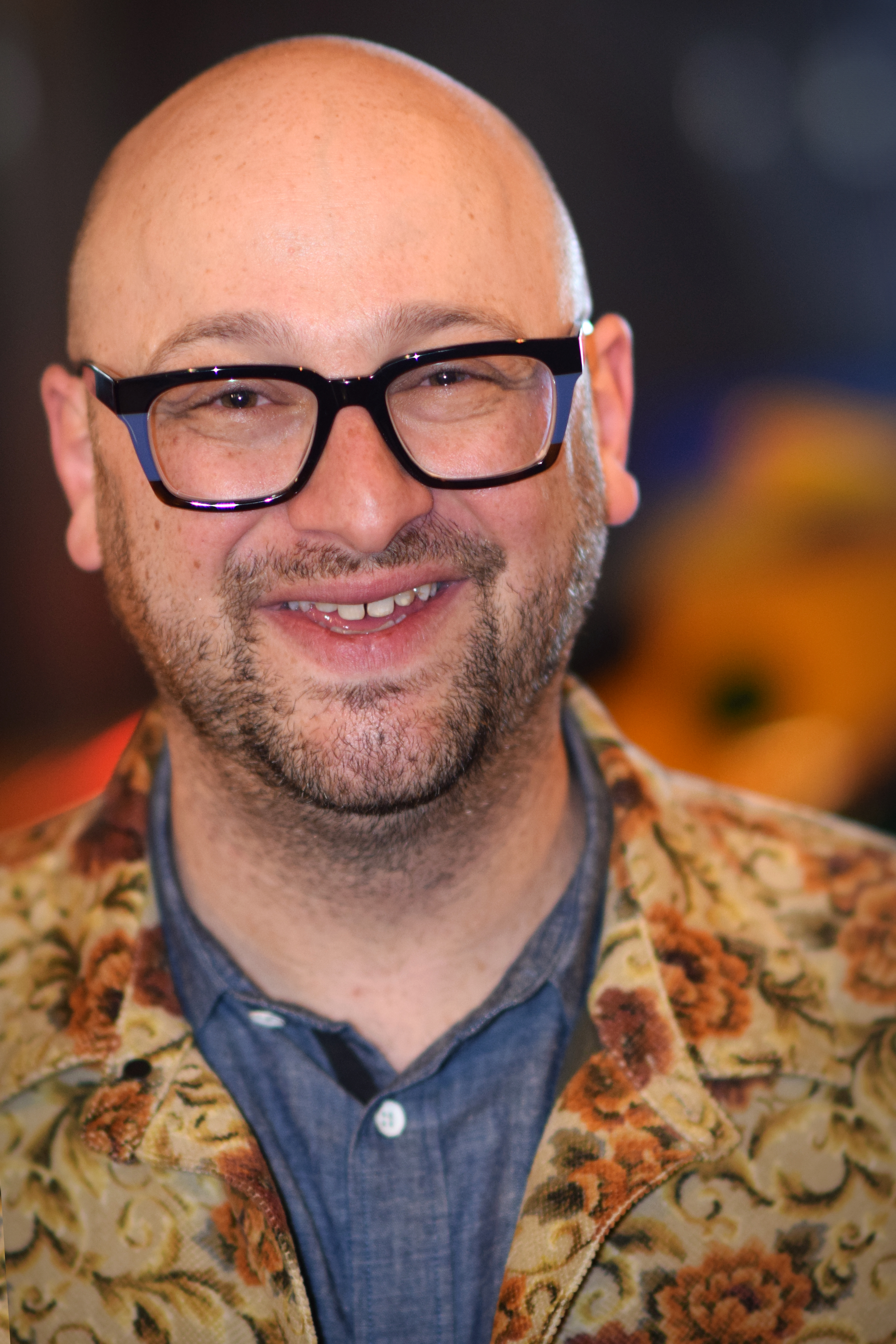
- Gondelman in 2024
- Born: Joshua Lyons Gondelman; January 15, 1985 (age 41); Stoneham, Massachusetts, U.S.
- Education: Brandeis University (BA)
- Occupation: Comedian
- Years active: 2004–present

Joshua Lyons Gondelman (born January 15, 1985) is an American author, comedy writer, producer, and stand-up comedian. He was a supervising producer and writer for Desus & Mero on Showtime. He was previously a writer on Last Week Tonight with John Oliver. He is also known for co-creating the parody Twitter account @SeinfeldToday.

== Early life and education ==
Gondelman grew up in Stoneham, Massachusetts, to parents Ellion Lyons and David Gondelman. He grew up in a Jewish family.

Gondelman graduated from Stoneham High School in 2003. He graduated from Brandeis University in 2007, where he double majored in creative writing and English and minored in Spanish.

== Career ==
When he was 19 years old, Gondelman began doing standup comedy in Boston. He did stand-up in Boston for seven years and occasionally returns. After college, he worked as a pre-school teacher and taught elementary school Spanish. In 2011, Gondelman moved to New York City, where his then-girlfriend lived, to pursue stand-up comedy.

During this time he also began doing freelance writing. He co-wrote his first major story, "Both Sides of a Break Up", with his ex-girlfriend; it was published in New York Magazine in 2012. In 2013, he wrote a story for Esquire describing his experience running in a Tough Mudder race in which he was sponsored by Wheaties in exchange for monetary compensation from General Mills and Zeus Jones. He has also written for McSweeney's, The New Yorker, and The New York Times.

In October 2015, a book co-authored by Gondelman and Joe Berkowitz entitled You Blew It!: An Awkward Look at the Many Ways in Which You've Already Ruined Your Life, was published.

=== Stand-up ===
As a stand-up comedian, he has opened for John Oliver, Jen Kirkman and Pete Holmes, and also performs regularly at New York City venues. Eve Peyser has said that during his stand-up, Gondelman "radiates humility and a relatable, everyday awkwardness alongside fierce confidence and wit."

Everything's The Best, his debut album, came out in 2011. His second album, Physical Whisper, was released on March 18, 2016.

In 2010, he won the Laughing Skull Comedy Festival in Atlanta, Georgia. In March 2016, he made his late-night television debut on Conan. He made his network television debut in January 2018 on Late Night with Seth Meyers. Gondelman also was a stand-up consultant for the final season of The Marvelous Mrs. Maisel.

=== SeinfeldToday ===
In December 2012, Gondelman created the Twitter account "SeinfeldToday", along with Jaclyn Moore, formerly of BuzzFeed. The account posted humorous tweets reimagining Seinfeld characters in modern-day situations. As of October 2015, the last time the account was active, it had more than 900,000 followers. At the 6th annual Shorty Awards in 2014, the account won an award in the "#Fakeaccount" category.

=== Last Week Tonight with John Oliver ===
In 2014, Gondelman was hired by Last Week Tonight with John Oliver as the web producer for the show's first season, and became a staff writer for the second season. In 2016, he won a Primetime Emmy Award for Outstanding Writing for a Variety Series for his work on the show. He and the writing team of Last Week Tonight won this same award in 2017, 2018, and 2019 as well as a Writers Guild of America Award in 2017.

=== Desus & Mero ===
In 2019, Gondelman left Last Week Tonight to become a senior staff writer and producer on Desus & Mero after the series moved to Showtime.

=== Wait Wait ... Don't Tell Me! ===
Since 2019, Gondelman has been a regular panelist on the NPR show Wait Wait... Don't Tell Me!. In March 2023, Gondelman was the guest host filling in for Peter Sagal while Sagal was on paternity leave.

=== The Bugle ===
Gondelman has been a frequent guest on The Bugle and The Gargle. In 2020, he also played an alternate universe version of himself on Alice Fraser’s daily podcast, The Last Post.

== Personal life ==
Gondelman is married to Maris Kreizman, the creator of the blog and book Slaughterhouse 90210. They live in Brooklyn with Bizzy, a senior pug.

== Awards ==
=== Emmy Awards ===
Year	Category	Nominated work	Result	Ref.
2015	Outstanding Writing for a Variety Series	Last Week Tonight with John Oliver	Nominated	
2016	Outstanding Writing for a Variety Series	Last Week Tonight with John Oliver	Won	
2017	Outstanding Writing for a Variety Series	Last Week Tonight with John Oliver	Won	
2018	Outstanding Writing for a Variety Series	Last Week Tonight with John Oliver	Won	
2019	Outstanding Writing for a Variety Series	Last Week Tonight with John Oliver	Won	

- 2014: Shorty Awards, #Fakeaccount category
- 2014: Peabody Award for Last Week Tonight with John Oliver
- 2017: Writers Guild of America Award, Comedy/Variety Series for Last Week Tonight with John Oliver

== Discography ==
- 2011: Everything's The Best!
- 2016: Physical Whisper
- 2019: Dancing on a Weeknight
- 2022: People Pleaser

== Filmography ==
- 2011: Quiet Desperation (TV series) – Actor (3 episodes)
- 2011: Viral Video (short) – as Agent
- 2013: Splashie (TV series short) – as Criminal
- 2014: Billy on the Street with Billy Eichner (TV series) – Creative consultant (2 episodes)
- 2014: Ramsey Has a Time Machine (TV series) – as Jackson Pollock in "Art"
- 2015–2019: Last Week Tonight with John Oliver (TV Series) – Producer (11 episodes), Writer (14 episodes)
- 2016: Night Train with Wyatt Cenac (TV series) – Actor in "Links & Logs"
- 2016: The Comedy Show Show (TV series) – Actor in "RISK! With Kevin Allison"
- 2016: @midnight (TV series) – as himself
- 2017: Wiki What (Facebook show) – Host
- 2020: The George Lucas Talk Show – as himself in "Revenge of the Sick: After Show"

== Works and publications ==
- Gondelman, Josh (2007). Anything to Fill the Silence (thesis/dissertation). Waltham, MA: Brandeis University. OCLC 126859941.
- Gondelman, Josh; Berkowitz, Joe (2016). You Blew It!: An Awkward Look at the Many Ways in Which You've Already Ruined Your Life. New York: Plume. ISBN 978-0-147-51580-3. OCLC 910009187.
- Gondelman, Josh (2019). Nice Try: Stories of Best Intentions and Mixed Results. Harper Perennial. ISBN 978-0062852755.

Selected articles

- Gondelman, Josh (13 July 2011). "Monologue: A Timid Ghost Requests Help Exacting Vengeance". McSweeney's.
- Gondelman, Josh; Dunn, Gaby (17 August 2012). "Both Sides of a Breakup: The Stray Condom Mystery". New York.
- Gondelman, Josh (13 March 2013). "My Adventures With 'Penis-Numbing' Spray". New York.
- Gondelman, Josh (11 June 2013). "So You Want To Leak Classified Documents?". Esquire.
- Gondelman, Josh (6 August 2013). "Mudder's Boy". Esquire.
- Gondelman, Josh (13 August 2013). "I Want to Make Love to You Like In the Movies". McSweeney's.
- Gondelman, Josh (9 December 2013). "Call of Duty: Homeland". McSweeney's.
- Gondelman, Josh (10 February 2014). "Live Coverage from a George Zimmerman Fight That Never Happened". Esquire.
- Gondelman, Josh (17 September 2014). "Works from the Los Angeles Museum of Photographic Self-Portraiture". The New Yorker.
- Gondelman, Josh (1 January 2015). "Famous Writers Play Taboo". The New Yorker.
- Gondelman, Josh (16 March 2015). "I Had Given Up On The NFL. Then Nana Became A Patriots Fanatic". BuzzFeed.
- Gondelman, Josh (31 July 2015). "Opinion: Welcome to Your Airbnb". The New York Times.
- Gondelman, Josh (16 September 2015). "Outerspanx, Butt Lampshades, and Zoolandery Vibes: A Fashion-Week Virgin Reviews Chromat". ELLE.
- Gondelman, Josh (29 September 2015). "How to Ruin a First Date: An Easy, 4-Step Guide". ELLE.
- Gondelman, Josh (15 September 2016). "Why You Should Give Thirsty Guys a Chance!". Glamour.
- Gondelman, Josh (23 May 2017). "One Day We Will Be Dead, but Scaachi Koul Will Still Matter". Esquire.

Wiki What?

- Bruney, Gabrielle; Gondelman, Josh; Miller, T.J. (September 3, 2017). "Watch T.J. Miller Have a Check-Up with the Wikipediatrician (Wiki What? #1)" (Includes video). Esquire.
- Miller, Matt; Gondelman, Josh; Bradley West, John (8 September 2017). "'Game of Thrones' Star John Bradley Reveals His Actual Name in This Hilarious Video (Wiki What? #2)" (Includes video). Esquire.
- Miller, Matt; Gondelman, Josh; Gilliard, Jr., Lawrence (18 September 2017). "Lawrence Gilliard Jr. of 'The Deuce' Explains the Tupac Connection on His Wikipedia Page (Wiki What? #3)" (Includes video). Esquire.
- Rense, Sarah; Gondelman, Josh; Upton, Kate (22 September 2017). "Kate Upton Doesn't Like Her Wikipedia Page Photo (Wiki What? #4)" (Includes video). Esquire.
