= Karen Chee =

American comedian and writer (born 1995)

- Born: February 22, 1995 (age 31); United States
- Education: Harvard University
- Occupations: Comedian and writer
- Employer: Late Night with Seth Meyers

Comedy career
- Years active: 2018–present
- Genres: Political/news satire, improvisational comedy, sketch comedy
- Subjects: American politics, Asian American culture, current events, racism, gender
- Website: karenchee.com

Karen Chee (born February 22, 1995) is an American comedian and writer. She has been a writer for Late Night with Seth Meyers, Pachinko, and A Man on the Inside.

== Early life and career ==
Chee was born on February 22, 1995. Her parents emigrated to the United States from South Korea.

Chee originally wanted to become a speechwriter, but became interested in pursuing professional comedy by the time she enrolled at Harvard College. During college, she was president of The Immediate Gratification Players, an improvisational comedy troupe, and founded a sketch comedy show.

Chee interned at Full Frontal with Samantha Bee and The Late Show with Stephen Colbert, where she appeared on air alongside Keegan-Michael Key. She contributed to publications including McSweeney's, Reductress, and The New Yorker. She also wrote for the 2019 Golden Globes for hosts Andy Samberg and Sandra Oh. She has appeared on HBO's High Maintenance. Chee is a regular panelist and occasional guest host on the NPR radio show Wait Wait... Don't Tell Me!.

In early 2019, Chee joined Late Night with Seth Meyers. She has appeared on air for a recurring segment called What Does Karen Know?, in which Meyers and Chee quiz each other about cultural touchstones which their respective generations take for granted.

== Personal life ==
Chee lives in Brooklyn, New York. In 2020, she temporarily relocated to South Korea to help take care of her grandparents. She continued to write remotely for Late Night.
