= Alzo Slade =

American journalist and radio personality

- Education: Prairie View A&M University (BA); Loyola Marymount University (MPhil)
- Occupations: Comedian, educator, journalist, photographer, writer

Alzo Slade is an American comedian, educator, journalist, photographer, and writer. He is currently an announcer, judge, and scorekeeper on the NPR gameshow Wait Wait... Don't Tell Me!. Prior to his work on the show, he was a reporter for Vice TV, as well as a professor and professional photographer. He has won an Emmy Award and a Peabody Award for his journalism.

== Biography ==
Slade grew up in the Austin, Texas area. He graduated with dual bachelors degrees in Radio/TV and History from Prairie View A&M University in 1999. While there, he was crowned Mr. Prairie View A&M. He later earned a Master of Philosophy from Loyola Marymount University.

In 2010, he co-founded, with Erika Lewis and Maurice Slade, the Southern hip-hop party organization Grits and Biscuits in New York City as a response to the lack of representation of Southern hip-hop at parties in the city. They have since toured the country. The trio, named E.Z.Mo Breezy, also created another dance party organization, dubbed Saturday Morning Cartoons, in 2011.

He taught at the College of New Rochelle as a philosophy professor, as well as at the International Center of Photography in Manhattan, New York. He has also worked as a photographer, including having shot concert photography for Prince. His photography has been featured on publications such as Marie Claire, Elle, and W, among others.

Slade has appeared on programs such as Random Acts of Flyness on HBO, MTV's Vidiots, VH1's program Down & Thirty, and Night Train with Wyatt Cenac. Other outlets he has worked with include National Geographic, the BBC, Hulu, and Showtime. He also appeared on a number of episodes of the comedy podcast Keith and The Girl. He hosted the podcast Cheat.

He joined Vice TV in 2018. In 2019, he appeared in the documentary She Did That!, which documents the lives of Black women entrepreneurs. While working with Vice, he earned a Peabody Award in 2020 for the documentary "Losing Ground", which examines heir properties and its effects on African-American land owners. He has also won an Emmy Award for his work.

Slade made his first appearance on Wait Wait... Don't Tell Me! in 2022, filling in as a host and as a substitute scorekeeper. In June 2026, he replaced Bill Kurtis as one of the participants and announcers of the show. He is only the third person to hold the position since 1998.
