= Shantira Jackson =

American writer, producer, actress, and comedian

- Born: Tallahassee, Florida, U.S.
- Education: Florida State University (BA)
- Occupation(s): Writer, producer, actress
- Years active: 2017-present

Shantira Jackson is an American writer, producer, actress, and comedian. Her writing credits include Busy Tonight, The Amber Ruffin Show, Saved by the Bell, and Big Mouth.

== Life and career ==
Jackson was raised in Florida. She received her bachelor's degree in Media and Communication Studies from Florida State University in 2008. She later moved to Chicago and trained and performed at The Second City. She was a member of the improv group 3Peat and co-wrote, produced and starred in group's Comedy Central web video 3peat: The Blackening.

In 2017 Jackson was a staff writer for the BET sketch series 50 Central that ran for one season. She was later a writer on Busy Philipps' late-night show Busy Tonight, which ran for one season from 2018 to 2019.

Jackson was a both a writer and consulting producer for the Saved by the Bell sequel series. She also writes for The Amber Ruffin Show, for which she received a 2021 nomination for a Primetime Emmy Award for Outstanding Writing for a Variety Series.

In 2021, she again collaborated with Busy Philipps as a producer and writer on the podcast Busy Philipps Is Doing Her Best (2021– ). She also joined the writing staff of Big Mouth, where she has become Executive Story Editor, and she is a writer for the spin-off series Human Resources. In November 2021 it was announced that Aunties, a semi-autobiographical comedy series Jackson wrote (co-executive produced with Mike Shoemaker, Seth Meyers and Amber Ruffin), was picked up for a put pilot production by NBC.

She is a recurring guest panelist on NPR's "Wait Wait... Don't Tell Me!"

== Filmography ==
Year	Title	Notes
2017	50 Central	Writer
2018–2019	Busy Tonight	Writer
2019	The Feels	Writer; web series
2019	The Jim Jefferies Show	Writer
2020–2022	Saved by the Bell	Writer, consulting producer
2020–2022	The Amber Ruffin Show	Writer
2022	Big Mouth	Writer; Executive Story Editor
2022–2023	Human Resources	Writer
