= Adam Burke (comedian) =

Northern Irish-American comedian

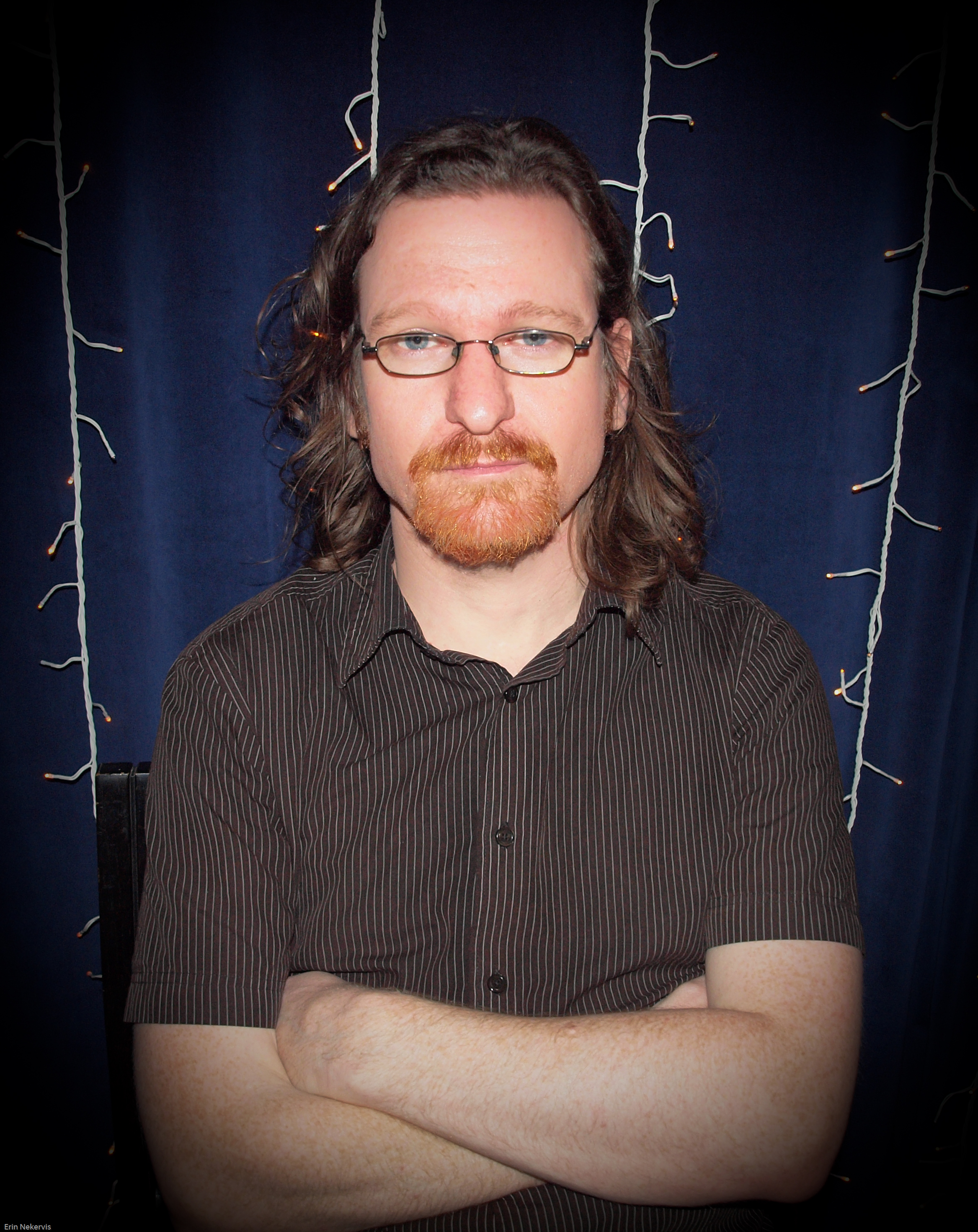
- Burke in 2010
- Born: Adam Burke; 10 January 1976 (age 50)

Comedy career
- Years active: 2000s–present
- Medium: Stand-up
- Genre: Observational comedy

Adam Burke is a stand-up comedian, writer, and comic artist in the United States, best known for multiple appearances as a panelist on the National Public Radio comedy news program Wait Wait... Don't Tell Me!

== Biography ==
Born in Australia and raised in Northern Ireland, Burke currently lives in Chicago, Illinois.

Adam Burke began his stand-up comedy career after his research for an article on the Chicago stand-up comedy scene for Chicago Social magazine led him to do an open mic night himself. Early gigs included co-hosting a Wednesday night open mic with Cameron Esposito at Cole's Bar in Chicago, Illinois. His influences include Spike Milligan, Bill Hicks and Steve Martin. Burke was voted Best Standup by readers of The Chicago Reader in 2014, and won Second City's Up Next Comedy Competition.

He has performed in comedy festivals such as the Bridgetown Comedy Festival in Portland Oregon, Just for Laughs Chicago, and Funny Or Die's Oddball Comedy Festival. He has opened for comedians including Marc Maron, Jeff Ross, Hannibal Burress, John Mulaney, Hari Kondabolu, Maria Bamford, Michael Ian Black, Kumail Nanjiani, John Oliver, Tracy Morgan and Aziz Ansari. In addition to performing, Burke was a writer for the local television comedy show Man of the People with Pat Tomasulo that aired on WGN-TV from 2018 to 2019.

He currently hosts the YouTube series The 5 O'clock Somewhere News with Comedian Adam Burke. Burke is a regular panelist for NPR's Wait Wait... Don't Tell Me! Burke has appeared on several podcasts and radio shows including Doug Loves Movies, The Benson Interruption, The Bob & Tom Show, and Put Your Hands Together with Cam & Rhea.

Burke released his debut album Universal Squirrel Theory on A Special Thing Records in 2012, and in 2024, he released Weaponized Empathy. In 2025, he released on YouTube his first filmed special UnAmerican. Burke is the creator of the webcomic The Grimbles (published from 2001 to 2005), and Diabolica (published from 2000 to 2001).
