= Negin Farsad =

American comedian and director (born 1978)

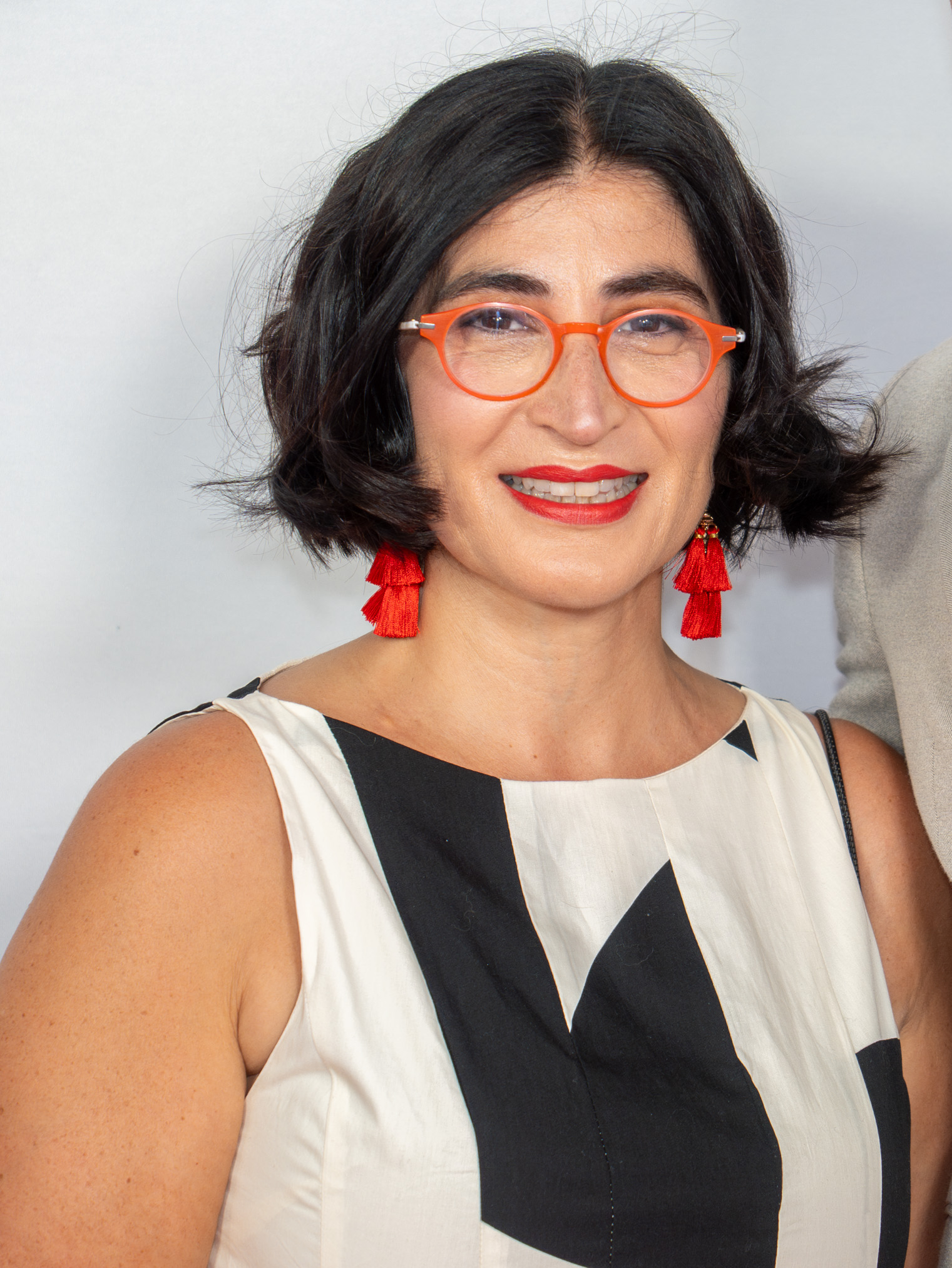
- Farsad in 2025
- Born: March 24, 1978 (age 48); New Haven, Connecticut, U.S.
- Notable work: The Muslims Are Coming!
- Spouse: Jason Tottenham

Comedy career
- Years active: 2000s-present
- Medium: Stand-up, television, film, radio
- Genres: Observational comedy, satire
- Subjects: American politics, Iranian culture, feminism, racism, current events, political satire
- Website: neginfarsad.com

Negin Farsad (Persian: نگین فرساد; born March 24, 1978) is an American comedian, actress, writer, and filmmaker based in New York City.

== Early life and education ==
Farsad was born in 1978 in New Haven, Connecticut, to an Iranian American Shia Muslim family, and was raised in the Southern California resort community of Palm Springs. With aspirations for a career in politics, she attended Cornell University and majored in government, as well as theater arts. She moved to New York City to attend Columbia University for grad school, earning a master's degree in race relations from the Graduate School of Arts and Sciences, and a master's degree with an emphasis on urban management from the School of International and Public Affairs.

She began working for New York City as a policy advisor to the New York City Campaign Finance Board. After more than a year in her role as a policy advisor, Farsad decided to leave her job with the city and pursue a career in comedy. She created her own production company, Vaguely Qualified Productions and committed herself full-time to her creative endeavors.

== Career ==
Her comedy routines often feature her views on politics, sex, and her experiences navigating the cultural dynamics of her Iranian-born family. In 2012 the Huffington Post named her on their "53 Of Our Favorite Female Comedians" article. She was also selected as a TED Fellow and gave a TED Talk in 2016 and 2017 for her work in social justice comedy.

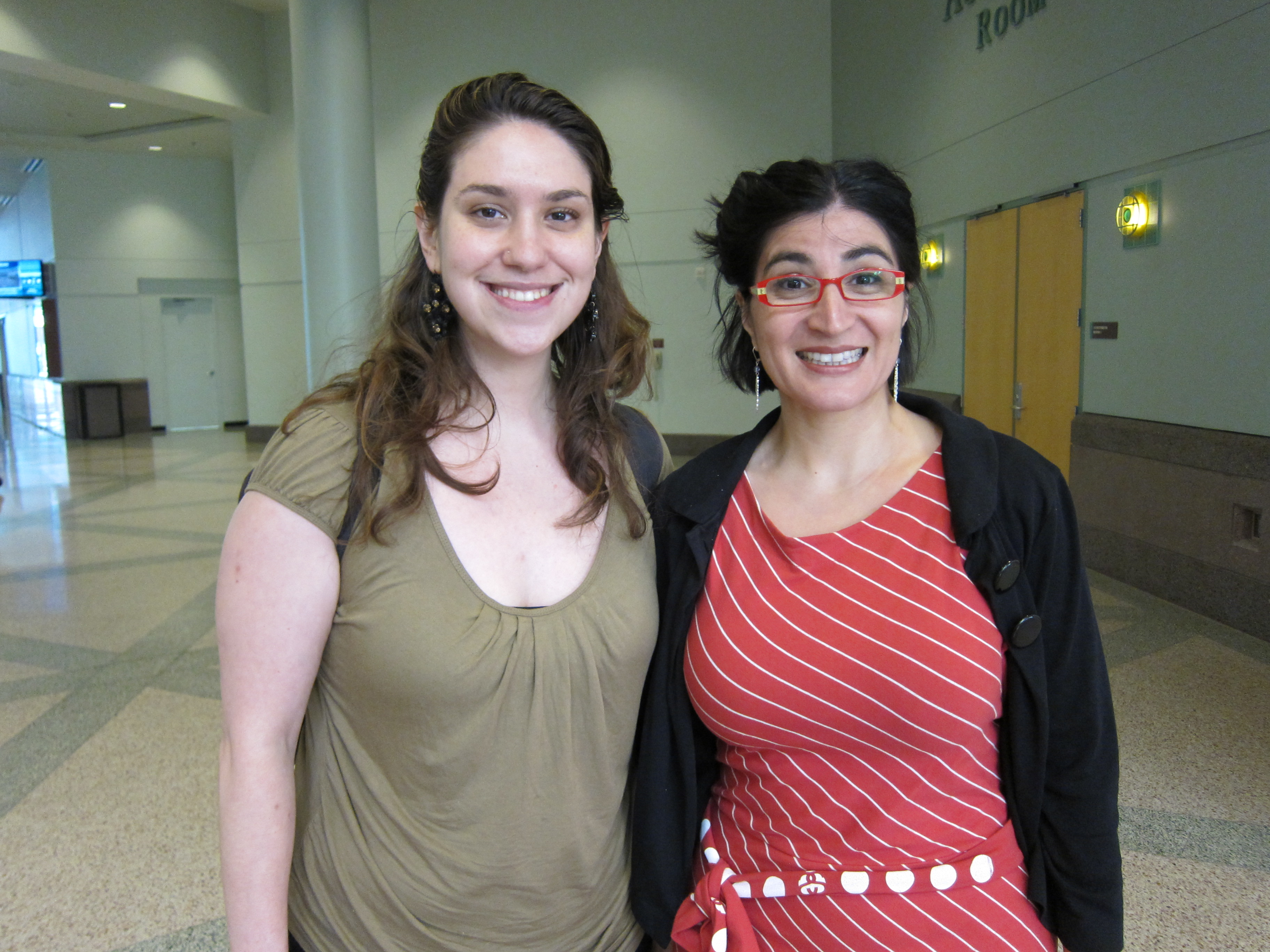
Katie Halper and Negin Farsad at Netroots Nation 2011

Farsad has performed for national and international audiences. In 2012, she was recognized by The Huffington Post as one of "18 Funny Women You Should Be Following on Twitter". Her solo show Bootleg Islam, which she wrote and performed, appeared in the DC, Dallas, and Chicago Comedy Festivals among others. Her first ever musical, The Israeli-Palestinian Conflict: A Romantic Comedy, premiered at the New York International Fringe Festival. Farsad is a frequent guest panelist and occasional host on National Public Radio's news game show, "Wait, Wait, Don't Tell Me."

=== Film ===
Nerdcore Rising – Farsad's first feature length directorial effort is a documentary/concert film directed and produced by Farsad starring Damian Hess, a.k.a. MC Frontalot, and various other nerdcore hip hop artists such as mc chris, Optimus Rhyme and MC Lars with contributors such as "Weird Al" Yankovic, Prince Paul and Brian Posehn. The film premiered at the 2008 South by Southwest film festival in Austin.

3rd Street Blackout – Farsad co-directed and starred in this romantic comedy. It follows a technology-obsessed couple that is forced to cope without their devices during a blackout post-Hurricane Sandy. It also stars Ed Weeks, Phyllis Somerville, Jordan Carlos, Janeane Garofalo, John Hodgman, and Sasheer Zamata. It premiered at the LA Film Festival in 2015.

The Muslims Are Coming! – Farsad directed the documentary with fellow comedian and filmmaker Dean Obeidallah. The film, which follows a group of comedians touring through the South and Midwest U.S., focuses on Islamophobia through the lens of comedy. The film features interviews with everyday citizens, religious leaders and celebrities, such as comedians David Cross, Jon Stewart, Janeane Garofalo, Colin Quinn, Lewis Black, and national news personalities Rachel Maddow and Soledad O'Brien.

=== Television ===
Farsad produced, directed and performed in the Comedy Central series, The Watch List, the first show to feature Middle-Eastern American comics tackling international political issues. She is the voice of Meredith the Mindtaker in Birdgirl.

=== Podcasts ===
Farsad hosts the political comedy podcast Fake the Nation, and is a frequent guest or panelist on other podcasts such as Wait Wait... Don't Tell Me!, Pod Save America., and StarTalk.

=== Publications ===
Farsad released her first book in 2016 titled How to Make White People Laugh.

== Personal life ==
She is married to Jason Tottenham.

As a child, she was intensely patriotic. She still keeps a small American flag she was given at age four when her parents and brother became naturalized citizens. Beginning in sixth grade, she carried a pocket Constitution in her backpack for 15 years.
