= Wait Wait... Don't Tell Me! =

American news panel radio game show

- Genre: Quiz show; panel show; comedy
- Running time: Approx. 50 min.
- Country of origin: United States
- Language: English
- Home station: WBEZ in Chicago, Illinois
- Syndicates: NPR; WBEZ
- Hosted by: Dan Coffey (1998); Peter Sagal (1998–present)
- Announcer: Carl Kasell (1998–2014); Bill Kurtis (2014–2026); Alzo Slade (2026–present)
- Created by: Doug Berman
- Produced by: Miles Doornbos; Ian Chillag; Jennifer Mills; Lillian King; Robert Neuhaus; Lorna White; Colin Miller; Emma Choi
- Executive producer: Mike Danforth
- Recording studio: Chicago, Illinois
- Original release: January 3, 1998 – present
- Audio format: Stereophonic
- Opening theme: B. J. Leiderman (composer)
- Website: waitwait.npr.org
- Podcast: www.npr.org/podcasts/344098539/wait-wait-don-t-tell-me

Wait Wait... Don't Tell Me! is an hour-long weekly news radio panel show produced by WBEZ and National Public Radio (NPR) in Chicago, Illinois. On the program, panelists and contestants are quizzed in humorous ways about that week's news. It is distributed by NPR in the United States, internationally on NPR Worldwide and on the Internet via podcast, and typically broadcast on weekends by member stations. The show averages about six million weekly listeners on air and via podcast.

== Format ==
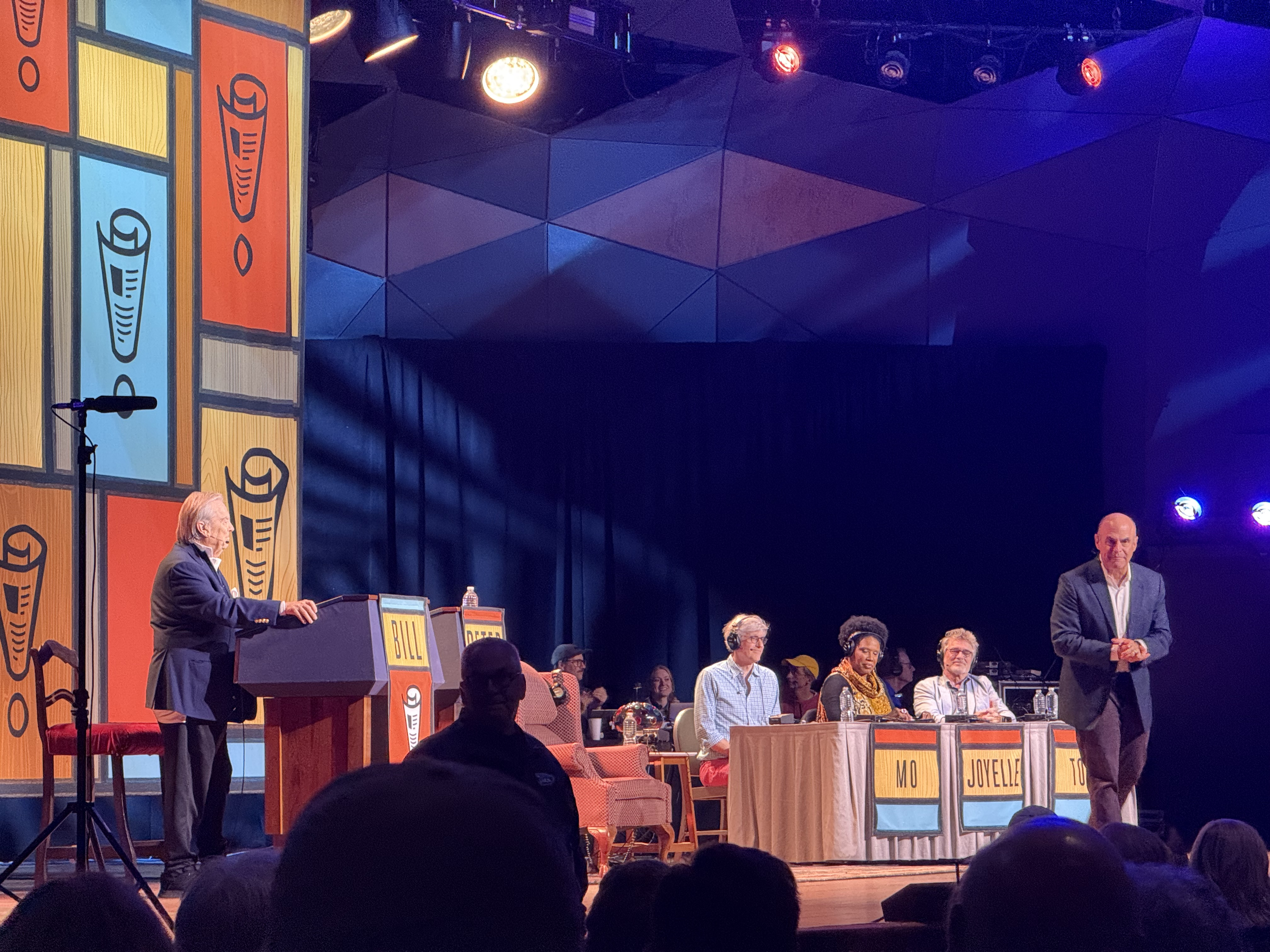
Taping of a 2025 episode at Tanglewood, with panelists Mo Rocca, Joyelle Nicole Johnson, and Tom Bodett

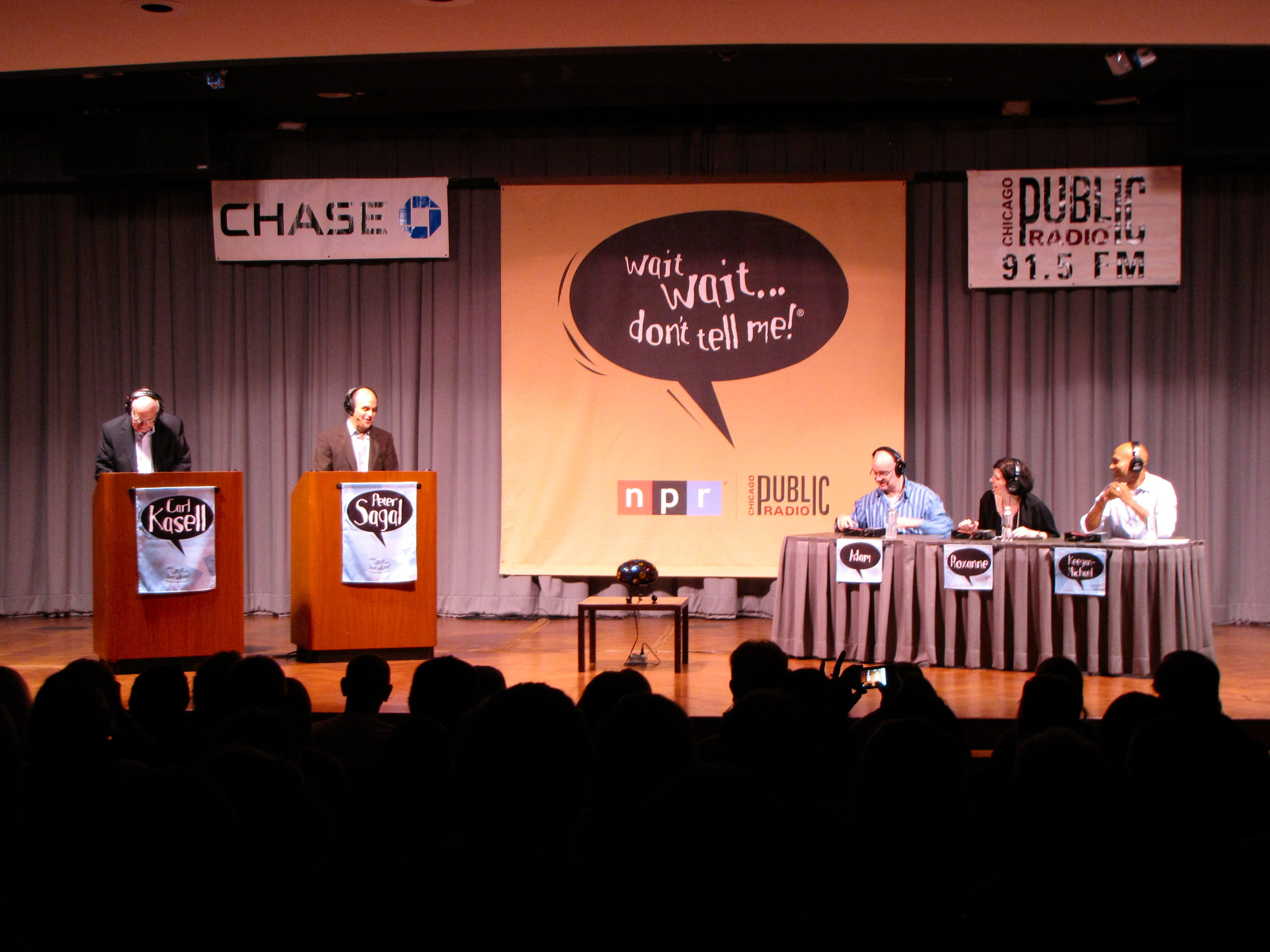
Taping of a 2010 episode at the Chase Auditorium, with panelists Adam Felber, Roxanne Roberts, and Keegan-Michael Key

Wait Wait... Don't Tell Me! premiered in 1998 and was recorded in front of a live audience in the Chase Auditorium beneath Chicago's Chase Tower on Thursday nights. Due to the COVID-19 pandemic, episodes were recorded remotely beginning March 2020, mainly from panelists' homes, with sound effects added for broadcast. Live audience recordings resumed in August 2021. In June 2022, the show moved to the Studebaker Theater in Chicago's Fine Arts Building. Episodes are periodically recorded on tour in venues across the United States.

The show is hosted by humorist and writer Peter Sagal. When the program had its debut in January 1998, Dan Coffey of Ask Dr. Science was the original host, but a revamping of the show led to his replacement in May of that year. The show has also been guest-hosted by Tom Bodett, Luke Burbank, Adam Felber, Peter Grosz, Tom Papa, Mike Pesca, Richard Sher, Bill Radke, Susan Stamberg, Robert Siegel, Brian Unger, Drew Carey, Tom Hanks, Helen Hong, Jessi Klein, Maz Jobrani, Negin Farsad, Alzo Slade, Josh Gondelman, Karen Chee, and Dulcé Sloan.

The announcer, also serving as judge and scorekeeper, is Alzo Slade, a journalist and stand-up comedian who previously filled in as guest scorekeeper. He succeeded Bill Kurtis, who served in the role from 2014 until 2026, though Chioke I'Anson, Lakshmi Singh, Andy Richter Helen Hong, Ayesha Rascoe, Joshua Johnson, Tim Meadows, and Rhymefest have substituted. Carl Kasell preceded Kurtis, who often filled in for him.

Wait Wait... listeners also participate by telephoning or sending emails to nominate themselves as contestants, or as of January 9, 2024, followers of the show's official Instagram account can click a link in the bio which will take them to a form to fill out and register to be a contestant. The producers select several listeners for each show and call them to appear on the program, playing various games featuring questions based on the week's news. Before October 21, 2017, the usual prize for winning any game was to have Kasell (named "Scorekeeper Emeritus" following his retirement) record a greeting on the contestant's home answering machine or voice mail system; after Kasell died in 2018, the prize was changed to have a host or panelist of the contestant's choice record a greeting.

== Panelists ==
In addition to the regular panelists listed below, the show also occasionally features one-off guest panelists.

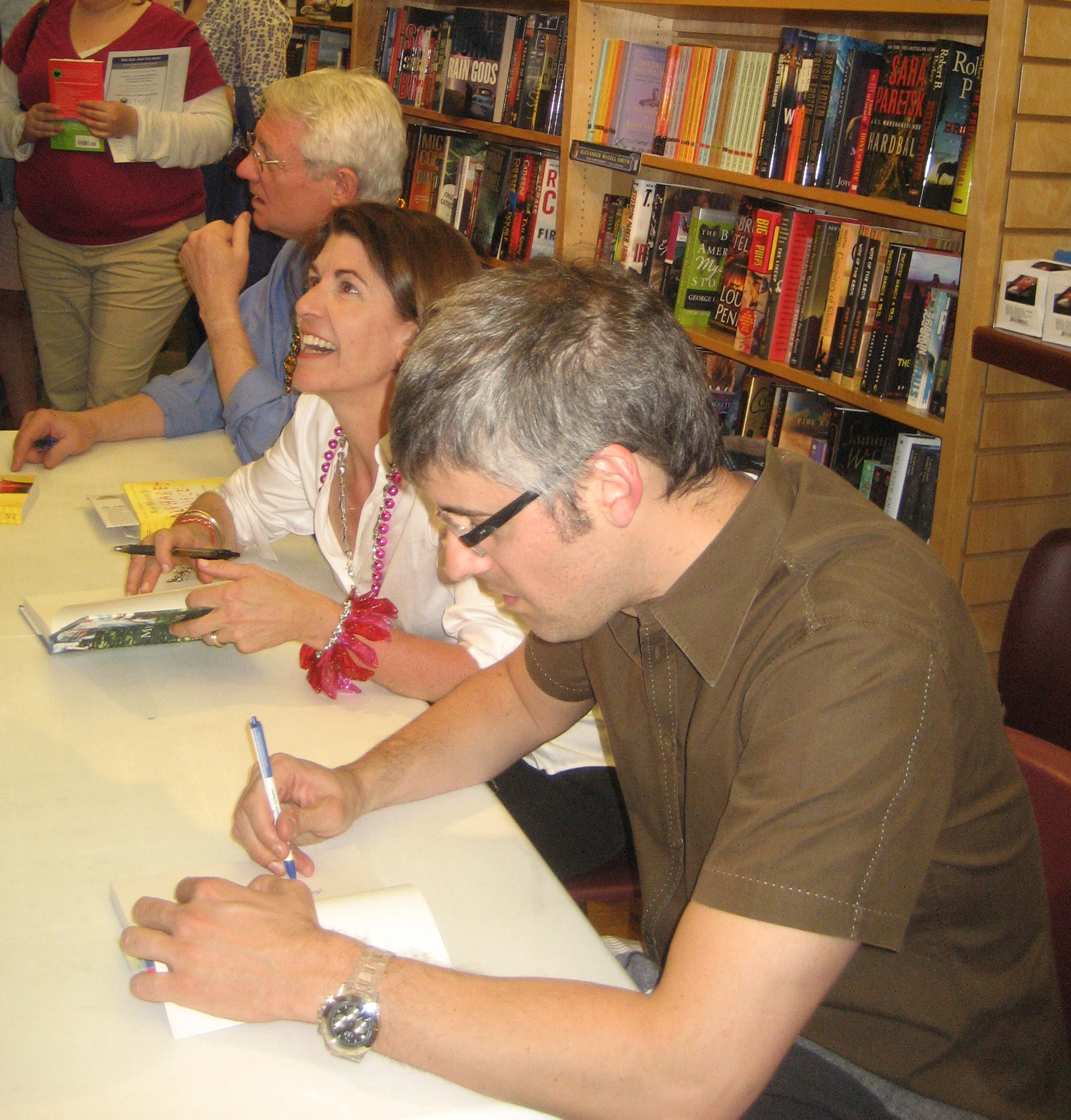
Regular Wait Wait... panelists (l–r) Roy Blount Jr., Amy Dickinson, and Mo Rocca sign autographs following a 2010 taping in New Orleans.

Regular

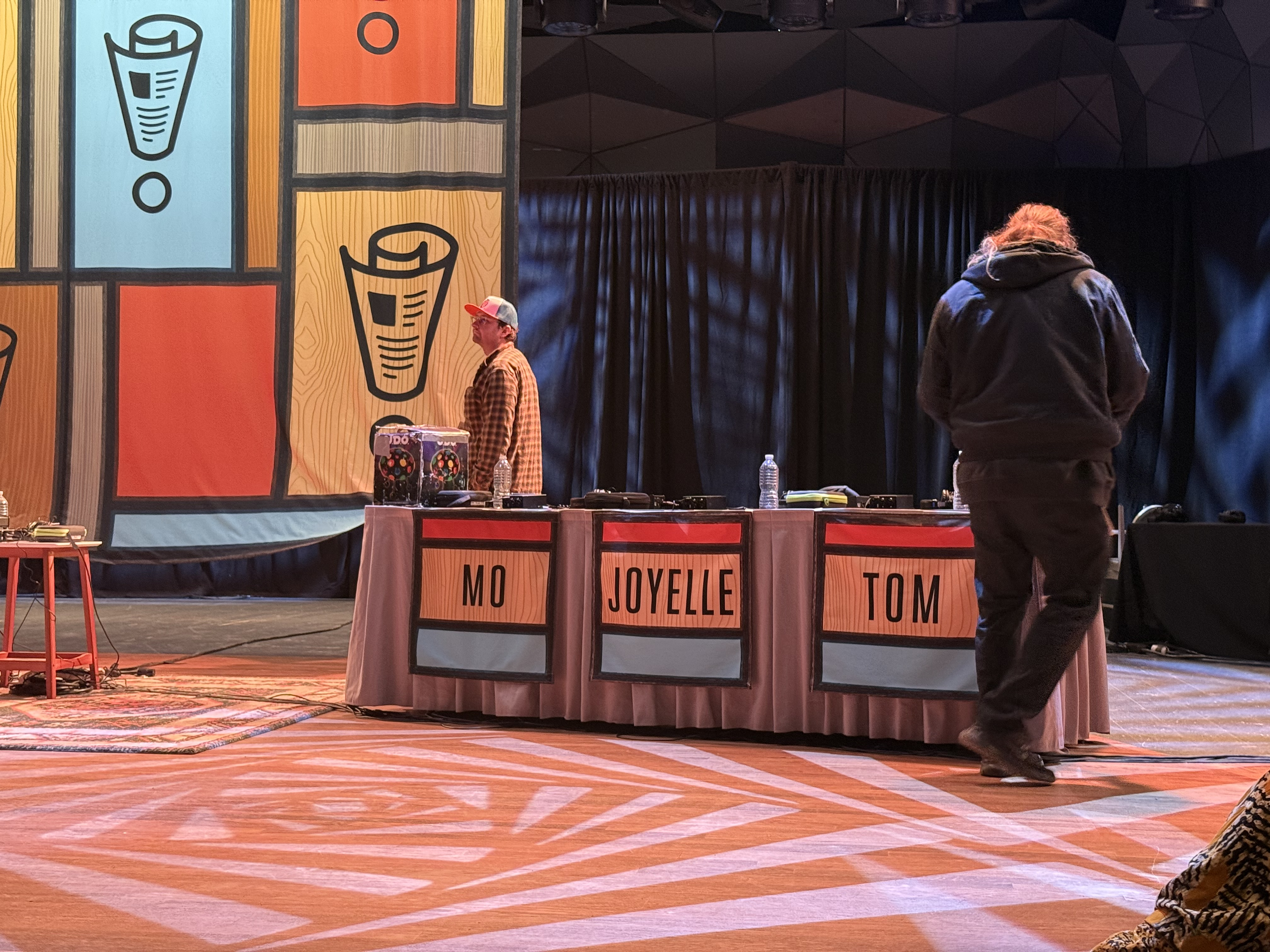
Panelist Table

- Cristela Alonzo
- Brian Babylon
- Emmy Blotnick
- Roy Blount Jr.
- Alonzo Bodden
- Tom Bodett
- Joel Kim Booster
- Luke Burbank
- Adam Burke
- Eugene Cordero
- Amy Dickinson
- Negin Farsad
- Adam Felber
- Bobcat Goldthwait
- Josh Gondelman
- Peter Grosz
- Maeve Higgins
- Helen Hong
- Shantira Jackson
- Maz Jobrani
- Joyelle Nicole Johnson
- Jessi Klein
- Hari Kondabolu
- Laci Mosley
- Tom Papa
- Paula Poundstone
- Roxanne Roberts
- Mo Rocca
- Faith Salie
- Dulcé Sloan

Past panelists

- Sue Ellicott (1998–2007)
- Aamer Haleem (2005–2006)
- Margo Kaufman (1998–1999)
- Angela Nissel (2006–2007)
- Patt Morrison (2000–2001)
- Kyrie O'Connor (2004–2015)
- P.J. O'Rourke (2001-2020)
- Charlie Pierce (1998–2015)
- Greg Proops (2015–2017)
- Paul Provenza (2006–2010)
- Richard Roeper (2004–2006)
- Peter Sagal (1998)
- Alzo Slade (2022–2026)
- Alison Stewart (2008–2009)
- Julia Sweeney (2009–2010)

== On-air segments ==
Though there are some deviations from time to time, episodes of Wait Wait... Don't Tell Me! feature the following format:

=== Opening tease ===
As with other NPR programs, Wait Wait offers a one-minute top-of-hour billboard teasing the program that will precede the network's hourly newscast (which traditionally starts at one minute past the hour). In this minute, the host offers a humorous comment on the week's news, mentions the identity of the week's interview guest, and sets up an out-of-context reading by the announcer of a quote or game title from the episode.

=== Who's Alzo This Time? ===
The contestant is asked to identify the speaker or explain the context of three quotations from that week's major news stories as read by the announcer (usually Alzo Slade). Each answer is followed by a humorous discussion of the story by the host and the panelists. Two correct answers constitute a win for the contestant. Before Kasell's retirement, the segment was known as "Who's Carl This Time?" and he read the quotations, then became "Who's Bill This Time?" during Kurtis' tenure. Whenever Slade is absent, his first name is replaced by that of the person filling in for him in the game's name.

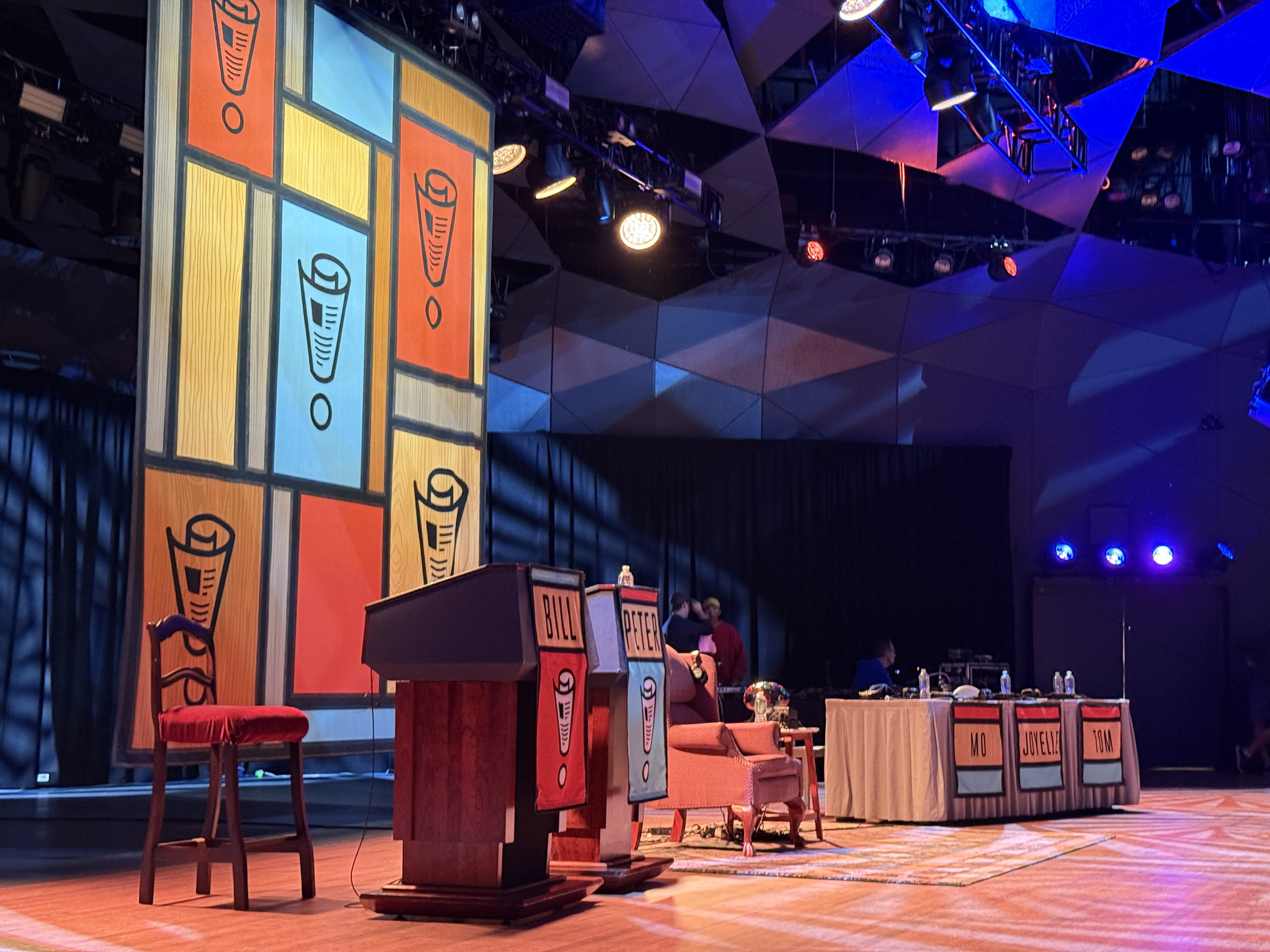
Announcer podiums (left), celebrity guest chair (center) and panelist table (right)

=== Panel questions ===
In two separate segments each week, the host asks the panelists questions regarding less serious stories in the week's news, awarding them one point for each correct answer. The questions are phrased similarly to those featured on The Match Game or Hollywood Squares to allow the panelists to offer a comedic answer in addition to their real guess as well as a hint from the host if needed. A discussion of the story often follows the answer.

=== Bluff the Listener ===
Each panelist reads an unusual story, all sharing a common theme. Only one of the three stories is genuine; the contestant wins the prize by choosing it. A sound bite from a person connected to the authentic story is played to reveal whether the contestant's guess is correct. Regardless of the outcome, the panelist whose story is chosen scores one point.

=== Not My Job ===
External audio
- Jimmy Wales plays "Not my job", 10:19, NPR, November 4, 2006

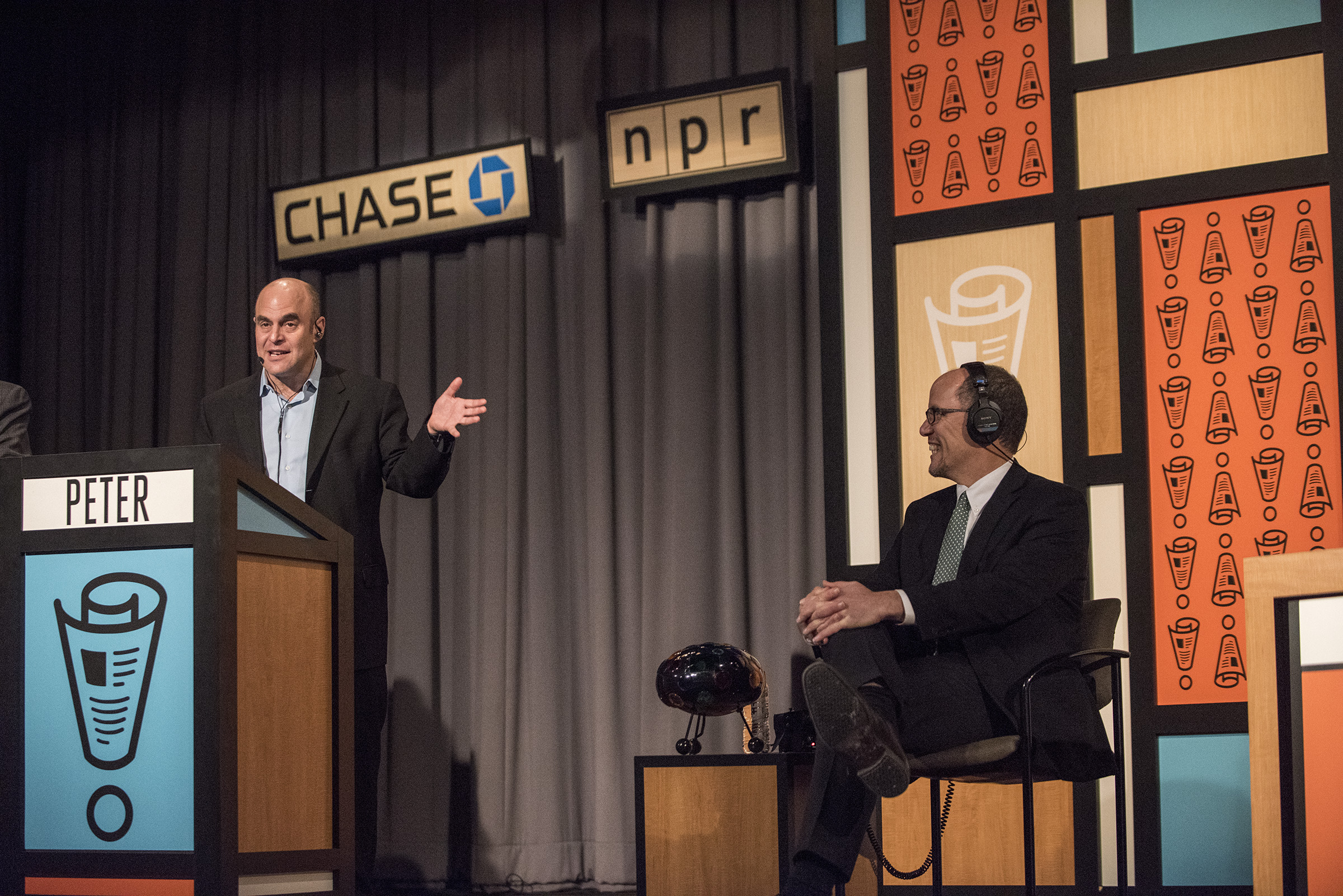
Wait Wait... with Tom Perez

A celebrity guest calls in (or occasionally appears onstage) to be interviewed by the host and the panelists as well as take a three-question multiple-choice quiz. In Wait Wait's early years, "Not My Job" guests were mainly pulled from NPR's roster of personalities and reporters; the pool of guests later expanded to include guests of greater celebrity. When the show tapes live on the road, the NMJ guest is often someone of local celebrity, as is the chosen listener.

As the segment's title suggests, the guests are quizzed on topics that are not normally associated with their field of work. For example, former U.S. Secretary of State Madeleine Albright was asked questions on the history of Hugh Hefner and Playboy magazine, while author Salman Rushdie was asked about the history of Pez candy. Often, the subject matter of the quizzes serve as an oblique yet comic juxtaposition to the guests' fields of work, such as when Mad Men creator/producer Matthew Weiner was quizzed on ways people try to cheer others up ("Glad Men") in a March 2015 appearance.

=== Listener Limerick Challenge ===
Slade (or the announcer) reads three limericks connected to unusual news stories, leaving out the last word or phrase of each. The contestant wins the prize by correctly completing any two of them. Philipp Goedicke writes the limericks.

=== Lightning Fill-in-the-Blank ===
In the Lightning Fill-in-the-Blank, each panelist has to answer as many questions as they can in 60 seconds with each correct answer earning the panelist 2 points. At the end there is a question whose answer gets an expanded clarification by Peter or whoever is guest hosting; this question usually deals with an especially odd or obscure news story from the week.

=== Panelist Predictions ===
Each panelist is asked to give their prediction of a story that may appear in the following week's news, often being prompted with a question that relates to a previously mentioned story. Sagal (or the week's host) does not award points, but quips that if any of the stories are correctly predicted, they will be asked about it on the following episode, which signals the end of the show.

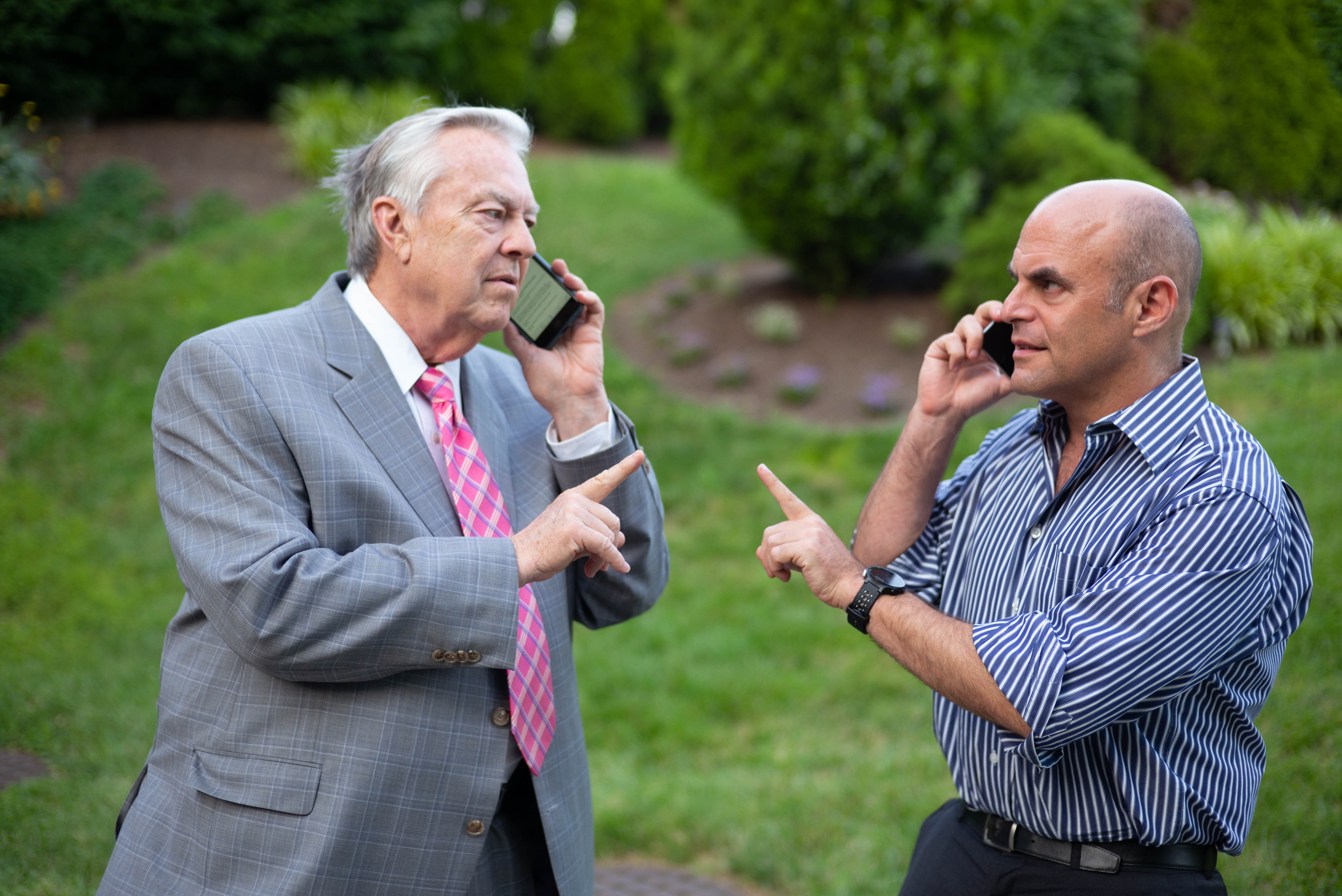
Kurtis and Sagal, 2017

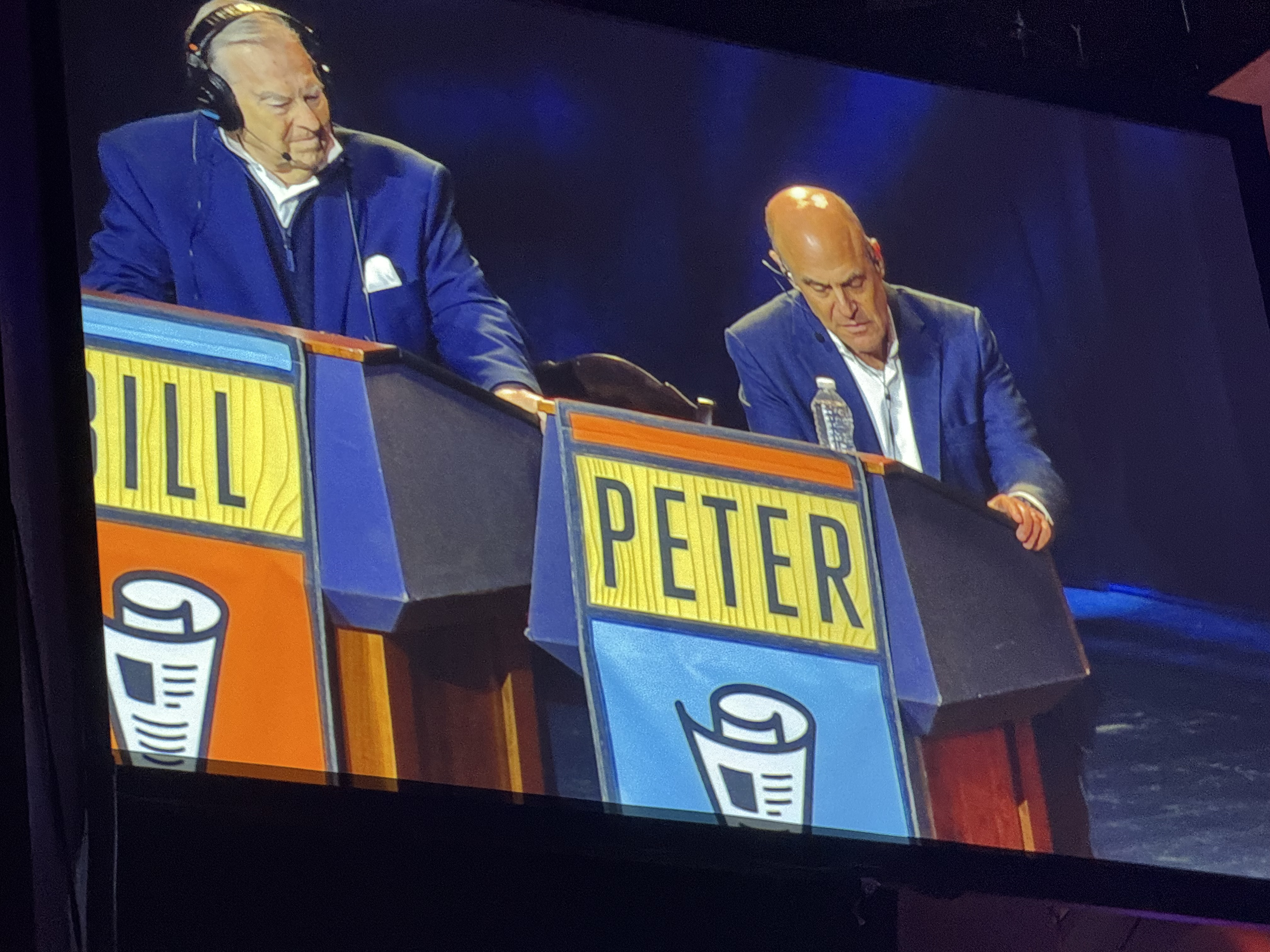
Kurtis and Sagal, 2025

== Television ==
In 2008, National Public Radio reached an agreement with CBS Entertainment to create a television pilot of Wait Wait... Don't Tell Me! Peter Sagal and Carl Kasell would be in the pilot, and Doug Berman would be the executive producer.

On November 16, 2011, BBC America announced that the show would make its television debut with a "2011 Year in Review" special airing on December 23, to be retransmitted by NPR stations on the 24th and 25th. The taping included two American panelists—Wait Wait regulars Paula Poundstone and Alonzo Bodden—and British newcomer Nick Hancock. In December 2018, NBCUniversal announced it was developing a television version of Wait Wait... Don't Tell Me!

== Live cinema ==
On May 2, 2013, an episode was performed at the NYU Skirball Center for the Performing Arts in New York City and was streamed live via satellite as a Fathom Events presentation to hundreds of cinema theaters throughout the United States and Canada. The show included host Peter Sagal, announcer Carl Kasell, and panelists Mo Rocca, Paula Poundstone, and Tom Bodett. Celebrity guest Steve Martin won in the Not My Job segment. The show featured a performance by Sharon Jones & The Dap-Kings.

== Awards ==
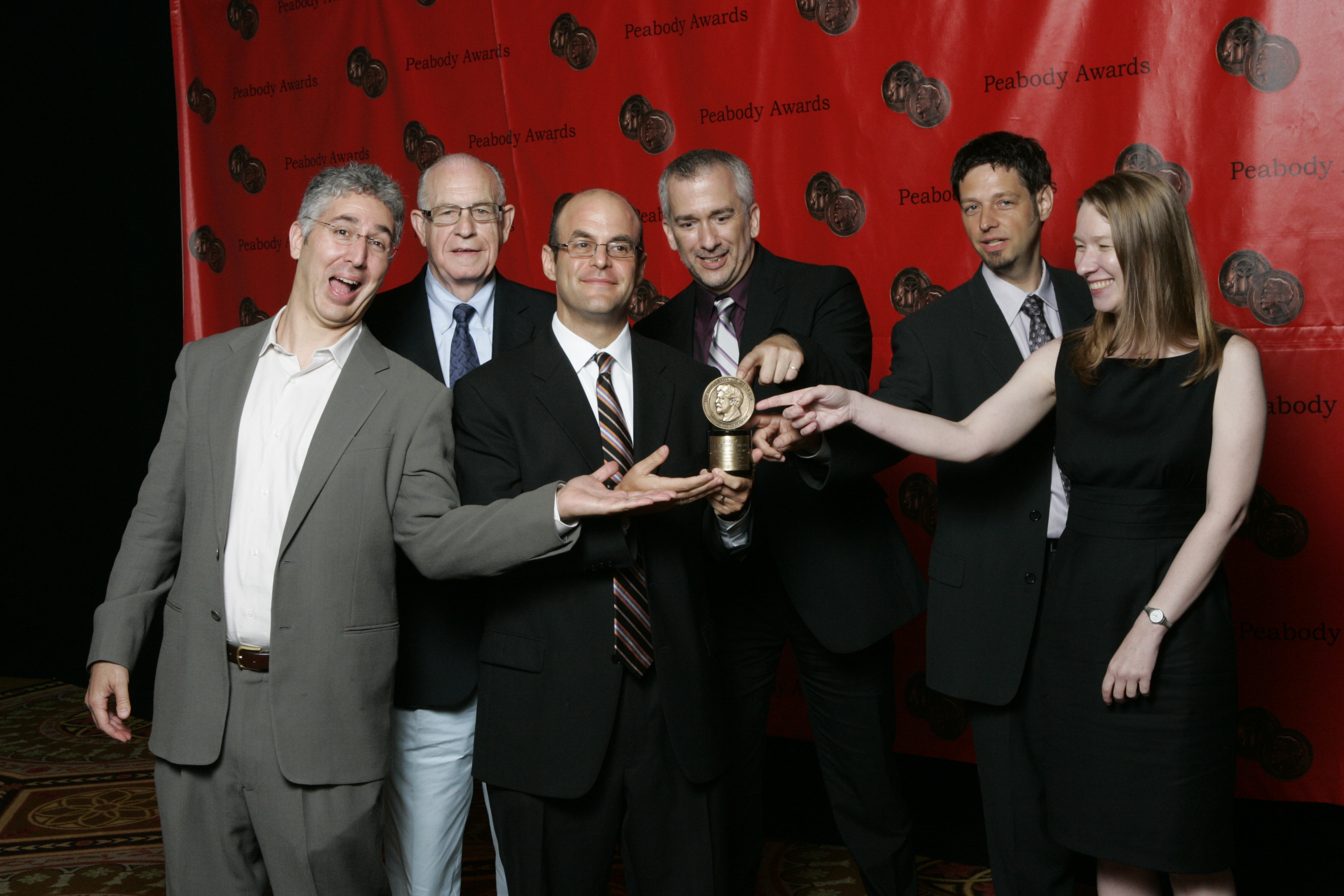
Peter Sagal (third from left) and the crew of Wait Wait...Don't Tell Me at the 67th Annual Peabody Awards

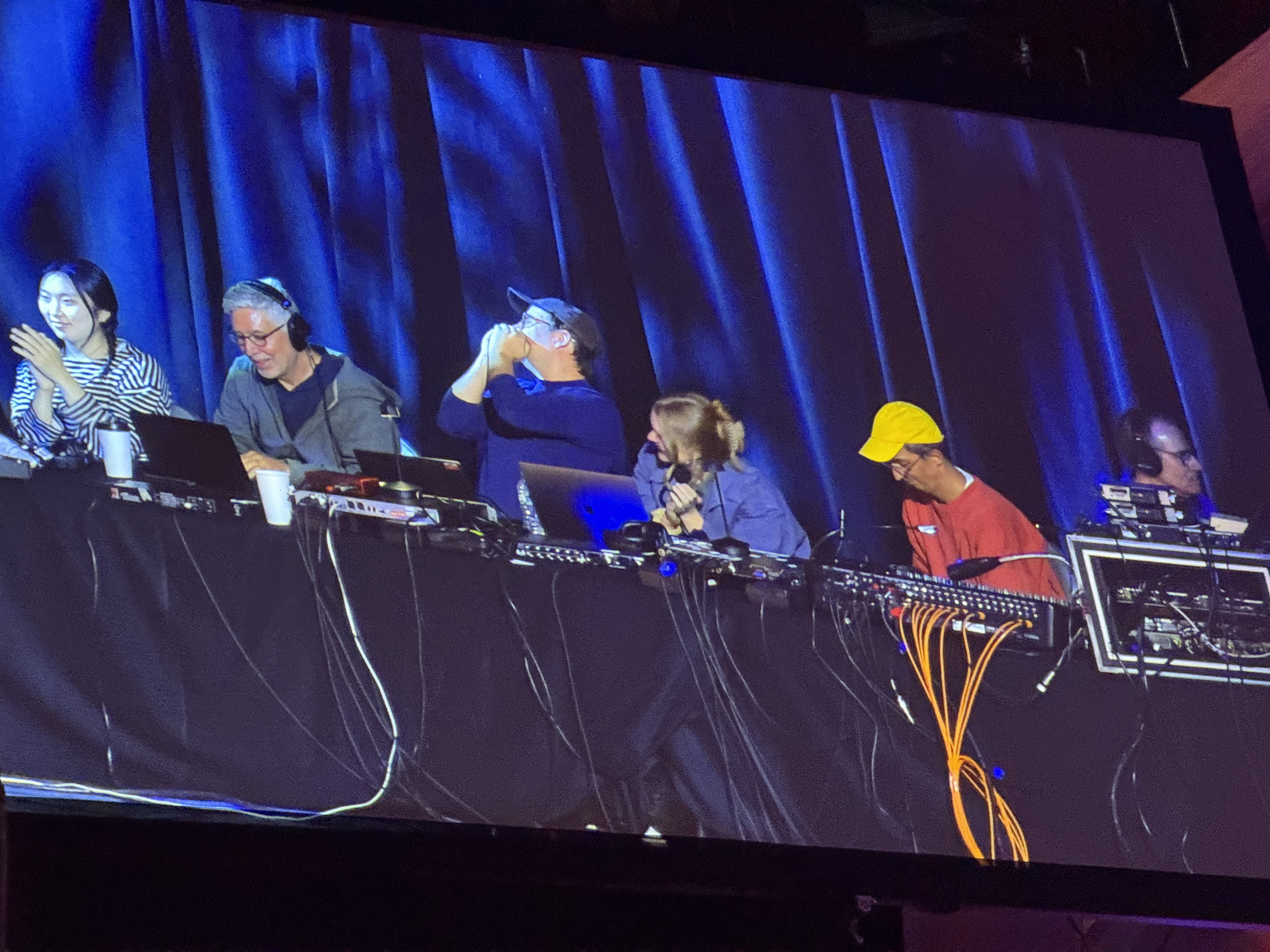
Production staff for Wait Wait... at Tanglewood

In April 2008, Wait Wait won a Peabody Award. The program website was nominated for a Webby Award for Humor in 2008.
