= Helen Hong =

American comedian, actress, producer and director

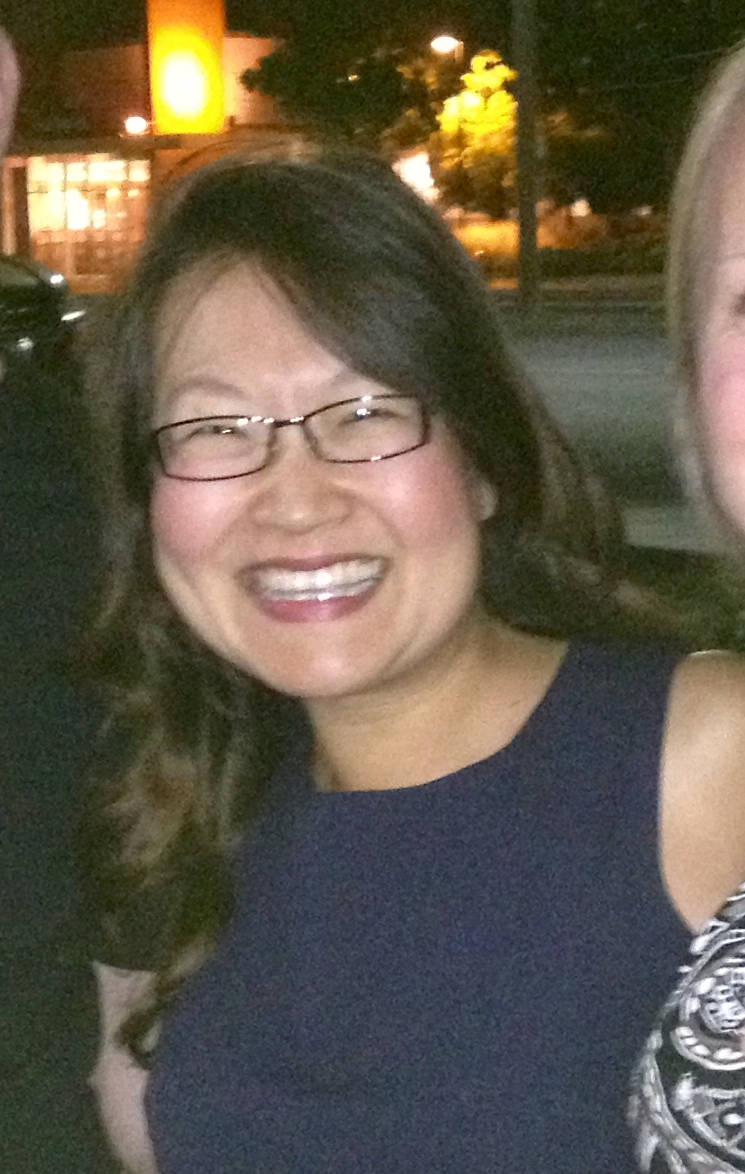
- Hong in 2014
- Occupations: Comedian; Actress
- Years active: 2009–present
- Website: helenhong.com

Helen Hong (Korean: 헬렌 홍) is an American stand-up comedian, actress, director, and producer. She has appeared in such works as Jane the Virgin, Parks and Recreation, and the Coen Brothers' Inside Llewyn Davis. She has a regular spot on NPR's Wait Wait... Don't Tell Me! and hosts a trivia podcast called Go Fact Yourself. She formerly hosted the podcast Little Ethnic Girls. She has a recurring role on Nickelodeon's The Thundermans and had a recurring role as Mrs. Song in Starz's Blunt Talk. Hong is known for her comedic NowThis videos.

== Early life ==
Helen Hong was born in Los Angeles, California. Her parents emigrated to New York City from South Korea. She was raised on the East Coast, but spent some time in South Korea, as well. Hong attended high school at Tottenville High School in Staten Island, New York and North Andover High School in North Andover, Massachusetts, and attended the University of Massachusetts in Amherst, Massachusetts.

== Career ==
Hong was not a standup comedy fan before a random shot of inspiration prompted her to take standup classes at New York City's Carolines on Broadway. During the course of the class, she realized that standup was what she wanted to pursue as a career.

Hong has performed at The Laugh Factory, Bonkerz, The Hollywood Improv, Zanies Comedy Club, Stir Crazy Comedy Club, Flappers Comedy Club, The Ice House Comedy Club, the Mary D. Fisher Theatre, Punch Line San Francisco and numerous other venues.

Hong has performed at events such as the Sedona International Film Festival, the Punchlines & Pumps Comedy Show at the Potawatomi Hotel & Casino, the New York Underground Comedy Festival, and The Great American Comedy Festival.

Hong has also performed in Puerto Rico for Armed Services Entertainment.

In March 2025, it was announced that Hong would be performing at Belly Laughs Comedy & Food Festival alongside other comedians such as Margaret Cho, Irene Tu, and Kumail Nanjiani.

== Personal life ==
Hong is the daughter of two Korean immigrants and was raised in New York. She has publicly expressed her passion for feminist movements and regularly shares her political stances and opinions on different forms of media. Hong is an active Bernie Sanders supporter.

Hong is a survivor of breast cancer.

== Awards and recognition ==
- In 2014, BuzzFeed named Hong as one of "18 Comedians Who Could Take Over The Late Show"
- In 2011, The Huffington Post included her on their list "53 Of Our Favorite Female Comedians"

== Filmography ==
=== Film ===
Year	Title	Role	Notes
2013	Epic	Thistle	Voice
2013	Inside Llewyn Davis	Janet Fung	
2018	Chasing Sunshine	Bianca	
2020	2 Minutes of Fame	Customer	
2020	The Babysitter: Killer Queen	Principal Highbridge	
2023	Sid Is Dead	Janet Han	
2024	The Thundermans Return	Mrs. Wong	
2025	If I Had Legs I'd Kick You	Eva	

=== Television ===
Year	Title	Role	Notes
2013	Adam Devine's House Party	Helen	Episode: "Neighbor Party"
2013–2018	The Thundermans	Mrs. Wong	22 episodes
2014	The Crazy Ones	Jenny	Episode: "Outbreak"
2014	New Girl	Teacher	Episode: "Fired Up"
2014	Inside Amy Schumer	Girl	Episode: "Tyler Perry's Episode"
2014	Pretty Little Liars	Lynn	Episode: "The Silence of E. Lamb"
2014	My Super-Overactive Imagination	Patron	Episode: "Friday Night"
2014	Bones	Attendee #1	Episode: "The Corpse at the Convention"
2015	Parks and Recreation	Janet Trungle	Episode: "2017"
2015–2016	Blunt Talk	Mrs. Song	4 episodes
2016	Togetherness	Fumi	Episode: "The Sand Situation"
2016	Scream Queens	Phlebotomist	Episode: "Blood Drive"
2016	Baked Goodes	Sweet Wife	Episode: "Spice Up Your Life"
2017	Don Paco's Casa	Nurse Cindy	Episode: "Health"
2018	Jane the Virgin	Felicia	Episode: "Chapter Seventy-Nine"
2018	Hollywood Darlings	Dr. Helen Hong	Episode: "Till Death Gets Me a Part"
2018	Splitting Up Together	Sunny	Episode: "Glowing Pains"
2019	Smothered	Dr. Arielle Allen	Episode: "Everyone Hates You"
2019	Huge in France	Dr. Barb	2 episodes
2019	Kingpin Katie	Linda Packman	Episode: "KOOM"
2019	The Filth	Priest	Episode: "Filthy Mind Maps"
2019	Gods of Food	Pak Jang-mi	Episode: "Pak Jang-mi: A Nun, Not A Chef"
2019	Silicon Valley	Tracy Robertson	4 episodes
2019–2021	The Unicorn	Emma	6 episodes
2020	Outmatched	Kourtney Kamanski	Episode: "Bad Guy"
2020	Magical Girl Friendship Squad	Daisy's Mom	2 episodes
2020	The Expanding Universe of Ashley Garcia	Dr. Ling	3 episodes
2021	Peeling the Stinky Onion	Dr. Lively	Television film
2021	Never Have I Ever	Sharon	2 episodes
2022	Kenan	Principal Manning	Episode: "Work Friends"
2025	The Thundermans: Undercover	Mrs. Wong	4 episodes
2025–present	Splinter Cell: Deathwatch	Jo Ahn	Voice
