= Vida Ghahremani =

Iranian film actress

Vida Ghahremani ویدا قهرمانی
- Born: June 12, 1936; Tehran, Imperial State of Iran
- Died: June 1, 2018 (aged 81); Los Angeles, California, U.S.
- Other name: Malihe Ghahremani (Persian: ملیحه قهرمانی)
- Occupations: Actress, educator, writer, designer
- Years active: 1954–2016

Vida Ghahremani (Persian: ویدا قهرمانى; 12 June 1936 – 1 June 2018) was an Iranian-born American film and stage actress, writer, and educator.

== Early life and education ==
Vida Ghahremani was born 12 June 1936 in Tehran. She began acting in films as a teenager, under the mentorship and influence of Khan Baba Motazedi. Her earliest work was in 1955 in Crossroad of Events (Persian: Chahar Rah-e Havades); followed by a 1958 film called Storm in Our Time (Persian: Toofan dar Shahr-e Ma). She was known for the first romantic kiss to be portrayed in Iranian cinema, when she played opposite to Naser Malek Motiei in Crossroad of Events (1955). She was just a teenager around 16 or 17 years old during the filming of the first kiss. and as a result she was expelled from Shahdokht High School during her final year.

After receiving her degree in Early Childhood Development, she worked at Institute for the Intellectual Development of Children and Young Adults, Tehran. In the 1960s, Ghahremani and her husband David Yeghiazarian opened the Cafe Kuchini in Tehran, a music venue and coffeehouse; which became a source of material for her later writings and theater work. She was the mother of three children.

== Career ==
She had lived in Canada for less than a decade, before moving to California. Ghahremani taught creative theatre and Persian language in Pleasanton, California and at the Berkeley Persian Center, where she had been an active member since its establishment in 1992.

In 2008, Ghahremani published Aroussi-e Khaaleh ("Auntie’s Wedding"), a collection of autobiographic stories. Her second book, Safar-e Kaash ("A Trip to Kaash"), published in 2010, was an autobiographical story of adventures during her early years of marriage to David Yeghiazarian.

Ghahremani received a B.A. degree in Early Childhood Education and held a diploma in Directing and Producing television. She was a member of the Screen Actors Guild (SAG), the Gem and Mineral society. In 2007, she finished a film with director Wayne Wang called A Thousand Years of Good Prayers, as supporting actress.

Her daughter is Torange Yeghiazarian, an actress and one of the founding artistic directors of Golden Thread Productions in San Francisco. Ghahremani served as an artistic associate at Golden Thread Productions. In 2015, she produced and starred in the theater work Isfahan Blues, in collaboration with Golden Thread Productions, Torange Yeghiazarian, L. Peter Callender, Nakissa Etemad, Laura Hope, and Marcus Shelby; it was inspired by the Duke Ellington Orchestra’s 1963 tour in Iran. Isfahan Blues dealt with the theme of music as a gateway to power and creativity.

== Filmography ==
Date	Title	Country released	Role	Notes
1955	Crossroad of Events (Persian: چهارراه حوادث, romanized: Chahar Rah-e Havades)	Iran	young woman	directed by Samuel Khachikian
1958	Storm in Our Town (Persian: طوفان در شهر ما, romanized: Toofan dar Shahr-e Ma)	Iran	Pari	directed by Samuel Khachikian
1961	Fire and Ashes (Persian: آتش و خاكستر, romanized: Atash va khakestar)	Iran		starring with Vigen
1961	The Hundred Kilo Bridegroom (Persian: صد کیلو داماد, romanized: Sad Kilo Damad)	Iran		
1961	Midnight Terror (Persian: Faryade nimeshab)	Iran	Mehri	
2007	A Thousand Years of Good Prayers	U.S.	Madame	directed by Wayne Wang
2008	The Stoning of Soraya M.	U.S.	Mrs. Massoud	
2016	Jimmy Vestvood: Amerikan Hero	U.S.	Maman (or Mother)	directed by Jonathan Kesselman and written by Maz Jobrani and Amir Ohebsion
