= Khorsandi =

Khorsandi (Persian: خرسندی) is an Iranian surname. Notable people with the surname include:

- Ehsan Khorsandi (born 1985), Iranian footballer
- Hadi Khorsandi (born 1943), Iranian poet and satirist
- Shappi Khorsandi (born 1973), Iranian-born British comedian and author
