= Johanna Basford =

Scottish illustrator

Johanna Basford OBE
- Born: 1983 (age 42–43)
- Education: Duncan of Jordanstone College of Art and Design
- Spouse: James Watt (m. 2013; div. 2020)
- Children: 2
- Website: johannabasford.com

Johanna Basford (born 1983) is a Scottish illustrator. Her illustrations are hand-drawn, predominantly in black and white, with pencils and pens, and can be found in products such as colouring books, wallpaper, beer labels and tattoos. She has published colouring books for adults.

== Personal life ==
Basford was born in 1983 in Scotland and grew up on her parents' fish farm in Auchnagatt in Aberdeenshire. After attending Ellon Academy, she graduated from Duncan of Jordanstone College of Art and Design (DJCAD) in Dundee in 2005 with a degree in textile design and a specialisation in screen printing.

Previously married to James Watt, the co-founder of BrewDog, together they had two daughters. In February 2021, she announced she had separated from her husband the previous year.

Basford lives and works in Aberdeenshire, Scotland, where she owns a studio in a converted farmhouse.

== Writing career ==
Basford believes computer generated graphics can feel "cold and soulless", which is why she uses traditional media.

Since publishing her first adult colouring book Secret Garden in 2013, she has sold more than 21 million books worldwide.

She was appointed Officer of the Order of the British Empire (OBE) in the 2016 Birthday Honours for services to art and entrepreneurship.

In 2019 she broke the Guinness World Record for the Largest Drawing by an Individual, creating a floral drawing over 501 square metres (5,390 sq ft) in twelve hours at her former school, Ellon Academy.

In 2021, she hosted the University of Dundee's Annual Public Lecture in Entrepreneurship and received the university's Entrepreneurial Recognition Award.

=== Works ===
Basford's commercial clients include Sony, Nike, Tate Modern and Starbucks. Queensberry-Hunt, a ceramics manufacturer, commissioned her to create hand-drawn designs for their tableware collection in 2008. In 2010, she created graphics for the iPhone app The New Goodbye. Basford was commissioned by Edinburgh Festival Fringe to illustrate the cover of their 2010 program. She worked with an Edinburgh-based design agency, Whitespace, to create a series of illustrations for the program and the final artwork for the #FringeCover #Twitterpicture crowdsourced illustration campaign.

In addition to her illustrations, Basford has designed glowing wallpapers, printed using special ultraviolet-sensitive inks.

In May 2013, Basford opened her first solo exhibition at Dundee Contemporary Arts called Wonderlands. In November 2017, she created a Scottish themed Google Doodle for the search engine's homepage on St Andrew's Day.

==== Books ====
- Johanna's Christmas (1 January 2013) – Virgin Book – Johanna's debut colouring book.
- Secret Garden: An Inky Treasure Hunt and Colouring Book (2013) – Laurence King Publishing — As of March 2015, more than 10 million copies of this book have been sold worldwide (three million in China alone). The book has been published in over 40 territories and has appeared on The New York Times Best Seller list.
- Secret Garden: 20 Postcards (21 January 2014) – Laurence King Publishing
- Secret Garden: Three Mini Journals (19 August 2014) – Laurence King Publishing
- Enchanted Forest: An Inky Quest and Colouring Book (2015) – Laurence King Publishing — Sold out all 226,000 copies within weeks of its release on 17 February 2015. The publishers printed a second edition of 250,000. It has also appeared on The New York Times Best Seller list.
- Secret Garden Artist's Edition: A Pull-Out and Frame Colouring Book /anglais (4 July 2015) – Penguin Random House
- Enchanted Forest Postcards: 20 Postcards (28 July 2015) – Penguin Random House
- Lost Ocean: An Inky Adventure and Colouring Book (27 October 2015) – Penguin Random House — Has sold over 1.3 million copies in the US alone. Debuted at Number 1 on the US Non Fiction Bestsellers list in its first week of publication and peaked at number one on The New York Times Best Seller list.
- Johanna Basford's Secret Garden Journal (1 December 2015) – Laurence King Publishing
- Magical Jungle: An Inky Expedition and Colouring Book (9 August 2016) – Penguin Random House
- Magical Jungle (11 August 2016) – Virgin Books
- Johanna's Christmas: A Festive Colouring Book (25 October 2016) – Penguin Random House
- Johanna Basford's Enchanted Forest Journal (29 November 2016) – Laurence King Publishing
- Lost Ocean: Artist's Edition (6 April 2017) – Virgin Books
- Magical Jungle: 36 Postcards to Color and Send (30 May 2017) – Penguin Random House
- Ivy and the Inky Butterfly: A Magical Tale to Color (10 October 2017) – Penguin Random House
- Ivy and the Inky Butterfly: A Magical Tale to Color (12 October 2017) – Virgin Books
- World of Flowers: A Colouring Book and Floral Adventure (23 October 2018) – Penguin Random House
- World of Flowers: A Colouring Book and Floral Adventure (25 October 2018) – Virgin Books
- Johanna Basford 2020 Weekly Coloring Planner Calendar (13 August 2019) – Andrews McMeel Publishing
- How to Draw Inky Wonderlands: Create and Colour Your Own Magical Adventure (15 October 2019) – Penguin Random House
- Johanna Basford Land, Sea, and Sky: Three Colourable Notebooks (10 March 2020) – Clarkson Potter
- Johanna Basford 2021 Weekly Coloring Planner Calendar (14 July 2020) – Andrews McMeel Publishing
- Miniature Secret Garden: A Pocket-sized Adventure Coloring Book (22 September 2020) – Laurence King Publishing
- Miniature Enchanted Forest (23 February 2021) – Laurence King Publishing
- Worlds of Wonder: A Coloring Book for the Curious (30 March 2021) – Penguin Random House
- Johanna Basford 2022 Weekly Coloring Planner Calendar (28 September 2021) – Penguin Random House
- Johanna Basford 2022 Weekly Coloring Wall Calendar: Special Collection of Whimsical Illustrations From Her Best-Selling Books (28 September 2021) – Andrew McMeel Publishing
- 30 Days of Creativity: Draw, Color and Discover Your Creative Self (26 October 2021) – Penguin Random House.

== Awards received ==
- 2007 – Elle Decoration Design Award
- 2009 – Channel 4 Talent Award
- 2021 – University of Dundee Entrepreneurial Recognition Award
