= Iranian stand-up comedy =

Iranian stand-up comedy refers to stand-up comedy by Iranians or based on Persian satire.

== Notable figures ==
- Ebrahim Nabavi, 2005 Prince Claus Award winner
- Hamed Ahangi
- Hadi Khorsandi
- Omid Djalili
- Maziar Jobrani
- Shappi Khorsandi
- Mehran Khaghani, Best Comedian in Boston, 2010, Boston Phoenix
- Tehran Von Ghasri
- Dan Ahdoot
- Max Amini
- Enissa Amani
- Zahra Noorbakhsh
- Tehran Von Ghasri

== See also ==
- Iranian cinema
