= Georgia Toffolo =

English media personality (born 1994)

- Born: Georgia Valerie Bennett; 23 October 1994 (age 31); Torquay, Devon, England
- Education: University of Westminster
- Occupation: Television personality
- Years active: 2014–present
- Television: Made in Chelsea (2014–2018); Celebs Go Dating (2017); I'm a Celebrity...Get Me Out of Here! (2017); This Morning (2018–present)
- Spouse: James Watt (m. 2025)

Georgia Valerie Toffolo (born 23 October 1994), also known as Toff, is a British television personality. She is best known for appearing on E4 reality television series Made in Chelsea from 2014 and winning the seventeenth series of ITV's I'm a Celebrity...Get Me Out of Here! in 2017.

== Personal life ==
Toffolo was born Georgia Valerie Bennett on 23 October 1994 in Torquay, Devon, to scrap-metal dealer Gary Bennett and property manager Nicola Toffolo. She is of Italian descent. Raised in Devon and London, she attended Stoodley Knowle Independent School for Girls, Torquay Girls' Grammar School, The Maynard School, and Blundell's School. She has said that she was bullied at school and, after telling her father, was moved to Blundell's as a boarder. She then started an LLB degree in law and politics at the University of Westminster, with an ambition to work in commercial law, but dropped out (although several newspapers have reported that she managed to complete a law degree). She then worked in a charity shop, an old people's home, a family-run firm of solicitors in Devon, and London law firm Family Law in Partnership.

Toffolo has been a member of the Conservative Party since she was in secondary school. She has stated with regard to her political views, "I believe that the traditions of our country should be upheld and I'm a real advocate of business." In 2024, she attended the 60th birthday party of Reform UK founder Nigel Farage. She dated George Cottrell between 2019 and 2023. She has been in a relationship with BrewDog co-founder James Watt since 2023. They got engaged in 2024 and married in Gardenstown, Aberdeenshire, Scotland, on 1 March 2025.

== Career ==
From its seventh series in 2014, Toffolo has appeared on reality-television show Made in Chelsea. In September 2017, she appeared in the third series of Celebs Go Dating. In November 2017, Toffolo was announced to be a contestant on the seventeenth series of ITV's I'm a Celebrity...Get Me Out of Here!. On 10 December, she won the series, beating Jamie Lomas and Iain Lee in the final. On 20 December, she announced she was joining This Morning. In October 2019, she appeared in Celebrity Hunted – Stand Up to Cancer, partnering with Stanley Johnson (Boris Johnson's father). Toffolo and her spaniel dog, Monty, appeared in 2020 on Channel 4's Celebrity Snoop Dogs (series one, episode two) which also gave an insight into her home near central London.

In 2018, Toffolo published her autobiography/memoir, titled Always Smiling. In 2020, Toffolo said that she was writing a four-part series for the British romance publisher Mills & Boon: Meet Me in London (2020), Meet Me in Hawaii (2021), Meet Me in Tahiti (2021), and Meet Me at the Wedding (2022). In 2021, she appeared on the BBC One quiz show The Weakest Link. ITV2 aired a 60-minute documentary film called In Search of Perfect Skin (2022), produced by ITN Productions. Toffolo, "who has previously taken a well-known but controversial prescription acne medication called Roaccutane", investigates how the drug has affected some users. In 2023, she appeared in I'm a Celebrity... South Africa. In 2020 she set up Visionary Talent Agency and in 2023 negotiated the contract for Nigel Farage's appearance on I'm a Celebrity.

== Filmography ==
Year	Title	Role	Note
2014–2018	Made in Chelsea	Herself	Cast member
2017	Celebs Go Dating	Herself	Series 3 cast member
2017	I'm a Celebrity...Get Me Out of Here!	Herself	Series 17 winner
2018	National Television Awards	Herself	Backstage presenter
2018	The Grinch	Mrs. Toffee Apple (voice)	Film debut
2018–2019	This Morning	Herself	Reporter
2019	Would I Lie to You?	Herself	Series 12, Episode 7
2019	Celebrity Gogglebox	Herself	With Stanley Johnson
2019	Celebrity Hunted	Herself	With Stanley Johnson
2019	My Famous Babysitter	Herself	Series 1, Episode 3
2019	Supermarket Sweep	Herself	1 episode
2020	I'll Get This	Herself	Series 2, Episode 4
2022	Georgia Toffolo: In Search of Perfect Skin	Documentary	
2023	I'm a Celebrity... South Africa	Herself	

Preceded by Scarlett Moffatt	I'm a Celebrity... Get Me Out of Here! Winner and Queen of the Jungle; 2017	Succeeded by Harry Redknapp
