= Secret Garden =

Secret Garden, The Secret Garden or My Secret Garden may refer to:

== Literature ==
- The Secret Garden, 1911 novel by Frances Hodgson Burnett, which spawned several adaptations:
  - The Secret Garden (1919 film), directed by Gustav von Seyffertitz
  - The Secret Garden (1949 film), starring Dean Stockwell and Margaret O'Brien
  - The Secret Garden (1987 film), a Hallmark Hall of Fame TV movie
  - Anime Himitsu no Hanazono, a 1991 anime series with 39 episodes which adapts the story
  - The Secret Garden (1993 film), a movie directed by Agnieszka Holland
  - The Secret Garden (1994 film), an animated adaptation produced by DIC Entertainment, Greengrass Productions, and Kalisto Ltd.
  - The Secret Garden (2020 film), a fantasy film directed by Marc Munden
  - The Secret Garden (musical), a 1989 Broadway musical with music by Lucy Simon
  - The Secret Garden (opera), 2013 opera by Nolan Gasser
  - The Secret Garden (TV series), 1975 BBC TV serial starring Sarah Hollis Andrews and Hope Johnstone
- "The Secret Garden", a short story by G. K. Chesterton featuring his Father Brown character
- Secret Garden: An Inky Treasure Hunt and Colouring Book, 2013 coloring book for adults by Johanna Basford
- My Secret Garden, a 1973 non-fiction book by Nancy Friday

== Music ==
- Secret Garden (duo), an Irish-Norwegian duo playing new-age instrumental music
- Secret Garden Party, a music festival in Cambridgeshire, England

=== Albums ===
- Secret Garden (album), 2014 album by Angra
- Secret Garden (Apink EP), 2013 EP by Apink
- Secret Garden (Oh My Girl EP), 2018 EP by Oh My Girl

=== Songs ===
- "The Secret Garden (Sweet Seduction Suite)", a 1990 single by Quincy Jones
- "Secret Garden" (Bruce Springsteen song), 1995
- "Secret Garden" (T'Pau song), 1988
- "Secret Garden" (Gackt song), 2000
- "Secret Garden", by the Vels from Velocity, 1984
- "Secret Garden", by Madonna from Erotica, 1992
- "Secret Garden", by Patrick Wolf from The Magic Position, 2007
- "Secret Garden", by Spiritbox from Eternal Blue, 2021
- "Secret Garden" (Oh My Girl song), 2018
- "The Secret Garden", by Aurora from the 2020 film of the same name
- "My Secret Garden", by Depeche Mode from A Broken Frame, 1982

== Television ==
- Secret Garden (South Korean TV series), a 2010 South Korean fantasy drama
- Secret Garden (Singaporean TV series), a 2010 Singaporean drama
- Secret Garden (2026 TV series), a British nature documentary series
- "Secret Garden" (Once Upon a Time), an episode of the seventh season of Once Upon a Time

== Other uses ==
- Secret garden (gardening), a therapeutic or sanctuary garden style
- The Secret Garden, a luxury restaurant in Edinburgh, Scotland operated by The Witchery
- Secret Garden (outdoor nursery), a playschool in the woods of Letham, Fife, Scotland
- Secret Garden (Big Brother), a secret room used in Big Brother (UK) series 6
