= Fire and Ashes (film) =

- Directed by: Khosrow Parvizi
- Written by: Khosrow Parvizi
- Produced by: Babken Avedisian
- Starring: Vida Ghahremani; Hamideh Kheirabadi; Samad Sabahi; Vigen
- Cinematography: Ghodratallah Ehsani
- Production company: Tehran Shahrestan Film
- Release date: 18 July 1961
- Running time: 115 minutes
- Country: Iran
- Language: Persian

Fire and Ashes (Persian: آتش و خاكستر; Atash va khakestar) is a 1961 Iranian film directed by Khosrow Parvizi. The film featured leading romantic couple the popular Armenian-Persian singer Vigen and actress Vida Ghahremani.
