= The Hebrew Hammer (film) =

- DVD cover
- Directed by: Jonathan Kesselman
- Written by: Jonathan Kesselman
- Produced by: Lisa Fragner; Josh Kesselman; Sofia Sondervan; Edward R. Pressman
- Starring: Adam Goldberg; Judy Greer; Mario Van Peebles; Nora Dunn; Peter Coyote; Richard Riehle; Sean Whalen; Tony Cox; Andy Dick
- Cinematography: Ruby Rosenvall
- Edited by: Sam Hodgins
- Music by: Sam Hodgins
- Production companies: ContentFilm; Intrinsic Value Films
- Distributed by: Comedy Central Films (TV); Strand Releasing (theatrical)
- Release dates: January 23, 2003 (Sundance); December 8, 2003 (TV); December 19, 2003 (theatrical)
- Running time: 85 minutes
- Country: United States
- Languages: English; Hebrew; Yiddish
- Budget: $1.3 million
- Box office: $82,157

The Hebrew Hammer is a 2003 American comedy film written and directed by Jonathan Kesselman. It stars Adam Goldberg, Judy Greer, Andy Dick, Mario Van Peebles, and Peter Coyote. The plot concerns a Jewish crime fighter known as the "Hebrew Hammer" who must save Hanukkah from the evil son of Santa Claus, who wants to destroy Hanukkah and Kwanzaa and make everyone celebrate Christmas.

The film parodies blaxploitation films, and features Melvin Van Peebles in a cameo appearance as "Sweetback".

== Plot ==
The film begins with a flashback to a young Mordechai Jefferson Carver. At school, Mordechai is tormented by his fellow students and his teacher for being a Jewish child in a public school predominantly attended by Christians, and for celebrating Hanukkah while everyone else celebrates Christmas. Although his teacher encourages her students to respect Mordechai for who he is, he feels further alienated as he walks through his neighborhood and sees a seemingly endless number of Christmas decorations and window displays celebrating the holiday and announcing that Jews aren't welcome. As he lies down on the sidewalk in front of a store saying "Jews 'OK' (for about 5 minutes)" and spins his dreidel to cheer himself up, Santa Claus walks by and crushes the toy under his foot, then gives Mordechai the finger.

The scene then changes to the present with Mordechai as the Hebrew Hammer, a certified circumcised "dick" who has dedicated his life to defending Jews. His snappy dress (a cross between that of a pimp and a Hasidic Jew) and tough-guy demeanor have made him a local hero within the Jewish community. Jews and African Americans have enjoyed a tenuous peace with the white Christians over the previous few decades because Santa has pursued a policy of inclusion and tolerance. This Santa is murdered and replaced by his cruel son, Damian, who stomped Mordechai's dreidel years earlier. Damian seeks to destroy Hanukkah and Kwanzaa, thus reserving December for Christmas alone. Mordechai is reluctantly recruited to stop Damian, gaining allies along the way, including love interest and daughter of the Chief of the Jewish Justice League Esther Bloomenbergensteinenthal and the Kwanzaa Liberation Front's leader Mohammed Ali Paula Abdul Rahim.

The fight takes them to exotic locales such as Israel, K-Mart, the Jewish Atomic Clock outside Jerusalem and the final battle at the North Pole.

== Cast ==
- Adam Goldberg as Mordechai Jefferson Carver / The Hebrew Hammer
  - Grant Rosenmeyer as Young Mordechai Jefferson Carver
- Judy Greer as Esther Bloomenbergensteinenthal
- Andy Dick as Damian Claus
- Mario Van Peebles as Mohammed Ali Paula Abdul Rahim
- Peter Coyote as Jewish Justice League Chief Bloomenbergensteinenthal
- Nora Dunn as Mrs. Carver
- Sean Whalen as Tim "Tiny Tim"
- Tony Cox as Jamal
- Richard Riehle as Santa
- Melvin Van Peebles as "Sweetback"
- Rachel Dratch as Tikva
- Harrison Chad as Schlomo
- Annie McEnroe as Mrs. Highsmith
- Elaine Hendrix as Blonde Bombshell
- Ed Koch as Himself
- Adam Rose as Addict Jewish Child
- Jimmy Walsh as Freckle-Faced Gentile
- Jason Fuchs as Adolescent Hasidic Boy

== Controversy ==
The Hebrew Hammer parodies many common stereotypes about Jews. During filming, the movie came to the attention of the Anti-Defamation League, which were concerned that it might promote unfavorable images of Jews; the film happens to include a direct parody of the ADL as members of the fictional Jewish Justice League. After viewing the film, Warren Katz of the ADL brought legal action against the producers of the film but lost in a summary ruling handed down by the United States District Court for the Northern District of New York. The film also drew criticism from some Christian groups, who argued that the film portrayed most Christians as being anti-Semitic and intolerant.

Many scenes were shot in Borough Park, Brooklyn, which has a large community of Hasidic Jews. Filmmakers were initially concerned that members of the Hasidic community might protest the movie, as they did with the 1998 film A Price Above Rubies, and shut down filming. The reaction of the Hasidim in Borough Park was mixed, however. No organized protest was pursued, and some residents of the neighborhood agreed to appear as extras in the film.

== Reception ==
The film received a rating of 52% on aggregate review site Rotten Tomatoes.

== Sequel ==
In 2017, plans for a sequel titled The Hebrew Hammer Vs. Hitler were announced.

== See also ==
- Santa Claus in film
