= Jimmy Vestvood: Amerikan Hero =

- Theatrical poster
- Directed by: Jonathan Kesselman
- Written by: Amir Ohebsion; Maz Jobrani
- Produced by: Amir Ohebsion; Ray Moheet; Norman Aladjem; Luke Taylor; Maz Jobrani; Matthew Helderman
- Starring: Maz Jobrani; John Heard; Deanna Russo; Sheila Vand; Vida Ghahremani; Marshall Manesh; Tehran Von Ghasri
- Cinematography: Armando Salas
- Edited by: Mike Mezzina
- Music by: Michael Cohen
- Production companies: Soul Mining Productions; Perfect Nose Productions; Buffalo 8 Productions; Oky Doky Productions; Worldwide Media Conspiracy
- Distributed by: Sky Island Films; Front Row Filmed Entertainment
- Release dates: October 2014 (Austin Film Festival); May 13, 2016 (United States)
- Running time: 84 minutes
- Country: United States
- Language: English
- Box office: $216,000

Jimmy Vestvood: Amerikan Hero is a 2014 comedy film directed by Jonathan Kesselman and written by Amir Ohebsion and Maz Jobrani. The film stars Maz Jobrani, John Heard, Deanna Russo, Sheila Vand and Marshall Manesh. The plot follows an Iranian who wins the Green Card lottery and moves to Los Angeles with his mom to pursue his dream of becoming an American hero.

The film premiered in limited release in United States on May 13, 2016, and grossed approximately $216,000.

== Plot ==
Jamshid/Jimmy Vestvood (Maz Jobrani), an Iranian wannabe Private Investigator (P.I.) who lives with his mother (Vida Ghahremani), wins the Green Card lottery. As he's celebrating in his hometown Tehran, accidentally an American flag catches fire. A video of the incident goes viral and Kox Media introduces him as a "Terrorist." After he and his mom come to United States, he realizes that he can't get any better job than a normal security guard at his family friend's shop, 'Mehdi the Butcher' (Marshall Manesh). As he's still chasing his dream of being a P.I., and becoming an American hero like his childhood idol, Steve McQueen, he is hired by millionaire JP Monroe (John Heard). Monroe wants Jimmy to investigate his younger wife, Marcy (Deanna Russo), whom he suspects of having an affair. After meeting Marcy, Jimmy falls for her beauty, and starts following her around to gather evidence. Jimmy finds out that Homayoun (Sam Golzari), Mehdi's son, is gay and is secretly dating African American Freddy. Jimmy's seventh cousin Leila (Sheila Vand), who has a big crush on him, tries to meddle. As the plot unfolds, it becomes obvious that the Monroes want to use Jimmy for their own gain, and now Jimmy and Leila have to save the day...

From the Jimmy Vestwood website: "The Pink Panther meets Borat in this broad satire about a bumbling yet lovable Iranian immigrant who wins the Green Card lottery and moves to Los Angeles to pursue his dream of becoming an American hero. Jimmy Vestvood aspires to be a cool cop like his childhood idol, Steve McQueen in the movie Bullitt, but soon discovers that the best job he can get is as a security guard at a Persian grocery store. Through a series of comically fateful events, Jimmy's naiveté is exploited when a corrupt arms dealer hires him as a private investigator. Framed as a terrorist by the fear-mongering Kox News, Jimmy is unwittingly embroiled in a conspiracy to start World War III. With the help of his seventh cousin, Jimmy must save the day and avert the imminent war while keeping his overprotective mother in the dark.

"At a time when tensions between the East and the West are at a boiling point, 'Jimmy Vestvood' playfully skewers American preconceptions of the Middle East and breaks new ground through its depiction of the first hero of Middle-Eastern descent in an American comedy."

== Cast ==
- Maz Jobrani as Jamshid Jimmy Vestvood
- John Heard as JP Monroe
- Deanna Russo as Marcy Monroe
- Sheila Vand as Leila
- Matthew Glave as Hank Shannity
- Vida Ghahremani as Maman(Mother)
- Marshall Manesh as Mehdi the Butcher
- Waleed Zuaiter as Malek
- Matt Ballard as Karl
- Chris Williams as ICE Agent
- Sam Golzari as Homayoun
- Navid Negahban as Mohammad Mohammad-Mohammadi
- Niousha Jafarian as Homeira
- Tara Grammy as MC Iran
- Anthony Azizi as Kamal/Horny Persian
- Kareem Matthews as Freddy
- Amir K. as Stoner 1
- Dan Ahdoot as Stoner 2
- Tehran Von Ghasri as D.J in wedding

== Release ==
The film had a limited release in the United States starting May 13, 2016, and grossed $61,000 in its opening week there. It was also released in United Arab Emirates and had grossed $54,000 there.

== Reception ==
=== Critical response ===
The film has received mixed reviews. Most notably, the Washington Post's Christopher Kompanek gave it a negative 37, writing: "Teetering precariously between satire and base humor, “Jimmy Vestvood” squanders opportunities for both." On the other hand, Charles Ealy from Austin360, who enjoyed the movie, wrote: "The satire is well-balanced and, more often than not, the jokes go over like gangbusters. With its humorous cultural lens, this movie should be a career-changing moment for Jobrani."

=== Awards ===
Award	Category	Recipient	Result	Refs
Austin Film Festival 2014	Audience Award: Comedy Vanguard	Maz Jobrani, Amir Ohebsion	Won	
Austin Film Festival 2014	Jury Award: Comedy Vanguard	Maz Jobrani, Amir Ohebsion	Won	
