= Khan Baba Motazedi =

Iranian cinema pioneer

- خان‌بابا معتضدی
- Born: Khan Baba Khan Motazedi; 1892; Tabriz, Qajar Iran
- Died: 1986 (aged 93–94); Tehran, Iran
- Other name: Khanbaba Motazedi
- Occupations: Filmmaker, cinematographer
- Known for: 1920s news footage in Iran

Khan Baba Motazedi (Persian: خان‌بابا معتضدی) (1892– 1986) also known as Khan Baba Khan Motazedi, was an Iranian pioneer within the field of Iranian cinema and motion picture photography. He was the third cinematographer in the country and made some of the earliest documentary films, primarily focused on the Qajar dynasty and silent film news footage.

== Biography ==
Khan Baba Motazedi was born in 1892 in Tabriz, Qajar Iran (now Iran). Motazedi, during the reign of Persia's Ahmad Shah Qajar, at 17 years of age, traveled from Iran to Lausanne, Switzerland to study French and English language, and he traveled to Paris two years later, to study electromechanical engineering. While living in France, he worked for Gaumont as a cinematographer.

Motazedi returned to Iran after the 1921 Persian coup d'état with a Gamun, a type of Gaumont brand camera, as well as a projection projector, and a collection of French films, and began making documentaries in his homeland. Filming his family and then the family of "Ahmad Hassan Mirza", the crown prince of Ahmad Shah, was the subject of his first experience. After that, filming Reza Shah Pahlavi in the Constituent Assembly and his swearing-in ceremony to the constitution in the National Assembly (Esfand 1304 on the Persian calendar, March 1926 on the Western calendar) are considered to be professional and lasting works of Khan Baba.

Before long, Motazedi's reputation as the most capable Iranian cinematographer rose to the attention of the Royal Court. The coronation ceremony in Golestan Palace, the inauguration of Iran's National Railway construction, the Constitutional Celebration in the National Assembly, the Armed Forces Parade, the inauguration ceremony of Iran's Scouts, the inauguration ceremony of the Risbaf factory, the inauguration ceremony of Radio Tehran were some of his works in Tehran cinemas and military centers.

Considering the titles of Motazedi's films, it can be said that the second twenty years of documentary-film production in Iran (1319–1299) found a direction in news-advertising, a trend that flourished more years later and became the mainstream of documentary filmmaking in Iran.

Simultaneously with his filmmaking activities, Motazedi, was the General Directorate of Iran's Customs during the early years of the Mohamad Reza Pahlavi.

Motazedi was awarded the first-class scientific medal of the Ministry of Education, Endowments and Endowed Industries on Sharivar 26, 1313 [September 18, 1934], as the first Iranian cinematographer of the first Pahlavi royal court.

Actress Vida Ghahremani in her early career was influenced by a mentorship by Motazedi.

He died in 1986 in Tehran.
