= Khosrow Parvizi =

Iranian film director

- Born: Abadan, Imperial State of Persia
- Occupation: Actor

Khosrow Parvizi (1933–2012) was an Iranian director.

Among his films, he directed the actress/singer Nooshafarin in her second film in Doshman ("Enemy"; 1973), which was considered a well-made commercial film.

== Filmography ==
- 1974: Khoshgela Avazi Gereftin
- 1973: Doshman ("Enemy")
- 1971: Looti
- 1971: The Bridge
- 1968: Keshtye Noah
- 1968: Seke do rou
- 1965: The Mountain Tiger
- 1963: The Bitter Earth
- 1962: The Last Hurdle
- 1962: A Girl Is Screaming
- 1961: Fire and Ashes (Atash va khakestar)
- 1960: Quiter Before the Storm
- 1959: Those Without Stars
