= I'm a Celebrity...Get Me Out of Here! (British TV series) series 17 =

I'm a Celebrity...Get Me Out of Here!
- Series 17
- Presented by: Anthony McPartlin; Declan Donnelly
- No. of days: 22
- No. of castaways: 12
- Winner: Georgia "Toff" Toffolo
- Runner-up: Jamie Lomas
- Companion show: I'm a Celebrity: Extra Camp
- No. of episodes: 22

Release
- Original network: ITV
- Original release: 19 November – 10 December 2017

Series chronology
- ← Previous; Series 16 Next → Series 18

I'm a Celebrity...Get Me Out of Here! returned for its seventeenth series on 19 November 2017 on ITV. The series is the third in a three-year contract, as confirmed by Ant & Dec at the end of the Coming Out show in December 2016.

In October 2017, it was confirmed that Ant & Dec would return to host the series, despite rumours suggesting that the pair would not be present due to Ant's admittance to rehab earlier in the year for drugs and alcohol addiction.

Made in Chelsea star Georgia Toffolo won the series on 10 December 2017, with Hollyoaks actor Jamie Lomas finishing runner up, and broadcaster Iain Lee finishing third. This was the first time in the show's history that women won three consecutive series. Professional boxer Amir Khan also became the highest-paid contestant in the history of the show, beating the previous £400,000 record held by Katie Price in series 9.

Three days into the series, Jack Maynard was removed from the jungle after offensive messages on Twitter were discovered.

Toff and Khan would return to the series six years later to participate in I'm a Celebrity... South Africa alongside other former contestants to try to become the first I'm a Celebrity legend. Khan became the third celebrity to be eliminated. Toff was next to be eliminated alongside series 19 contestant Andy Whyment.

== Teaser ==
The first teaser trailer was released on 1 November 2017. The trailer featured a jungle and horizon, with Ant & Dec shouting "Let's Get Ready to Jungle". A series of "countdown" trailers were released from 6 November 2017.

== Celebrities ==
The cast was confirmed on 13 November 2017. On 21 November, Iain Lee and Kezia Dugdale were confirmed as late entrances to the series.

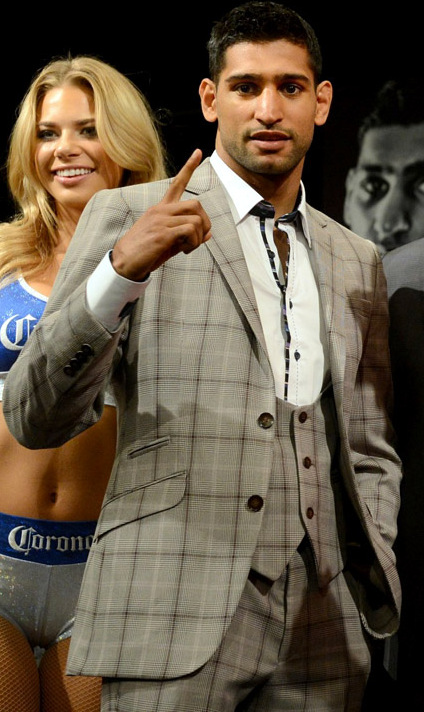
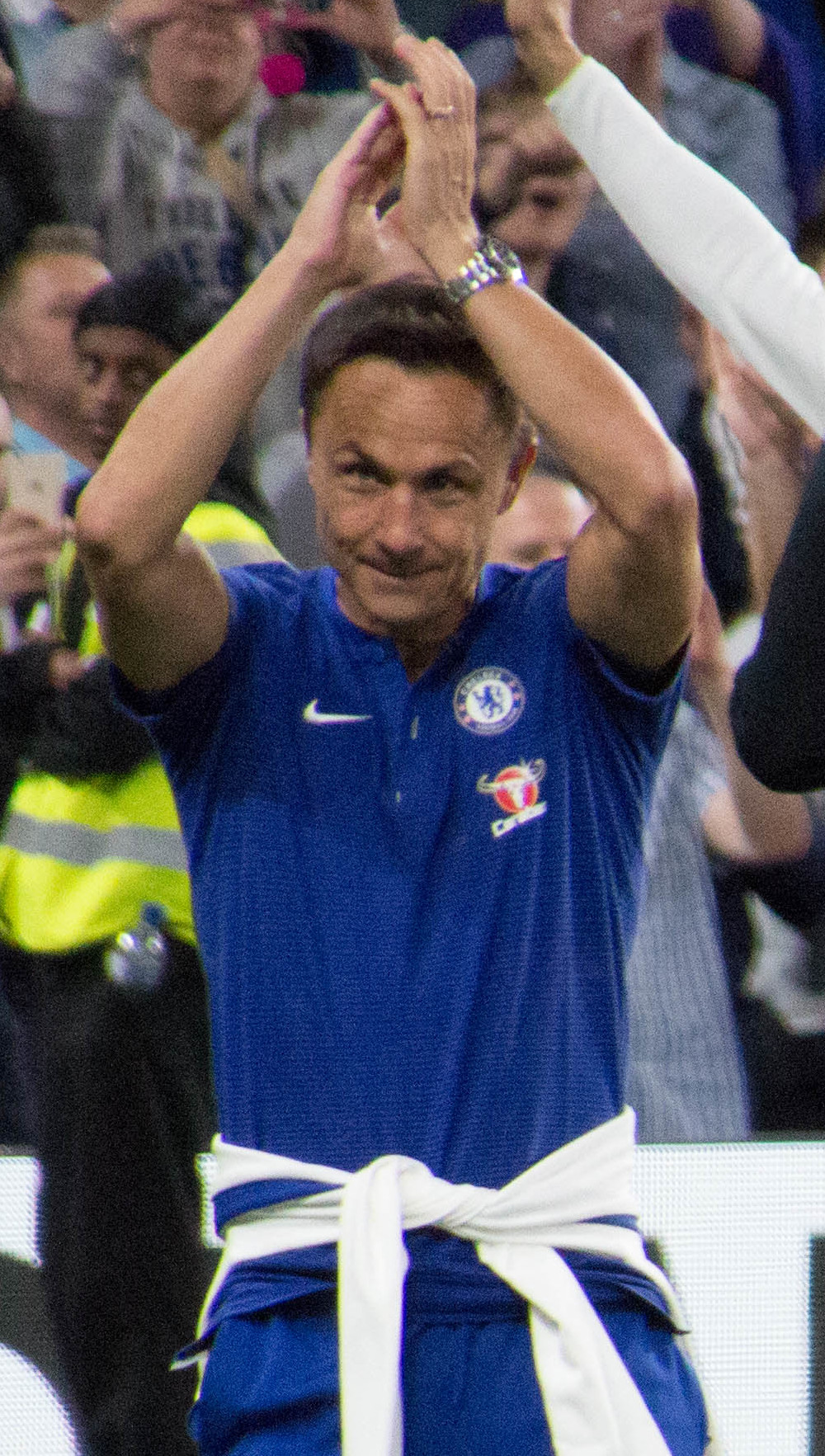
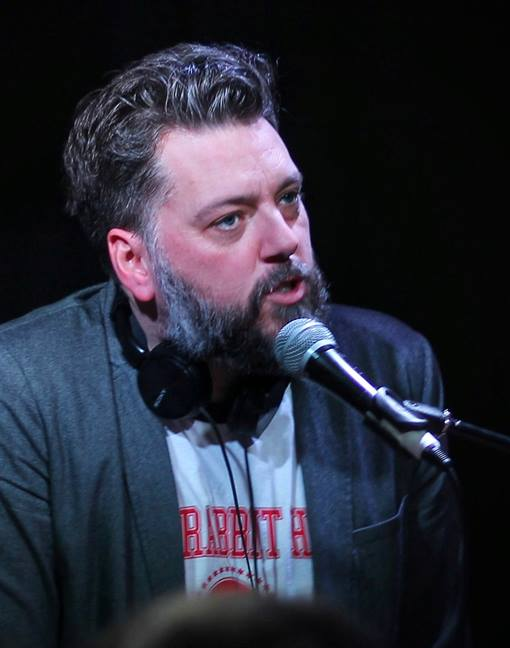
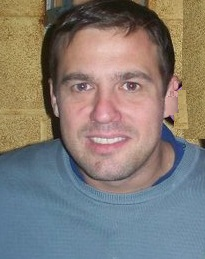
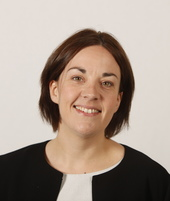
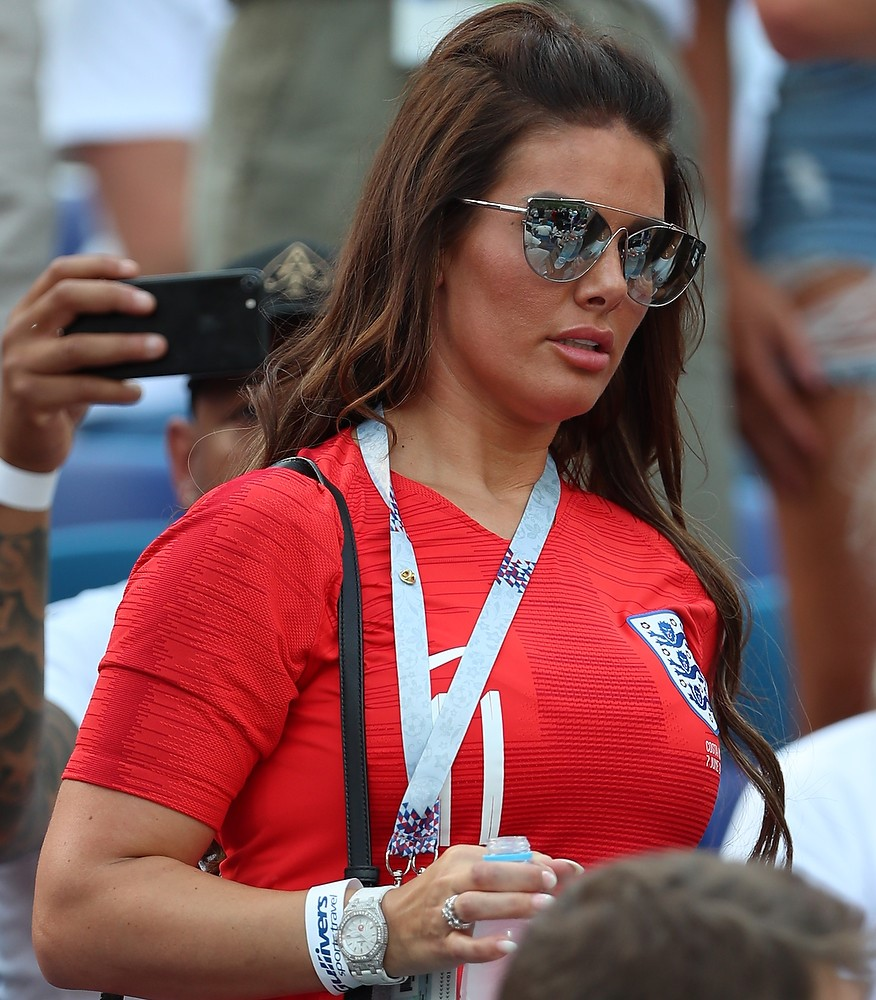
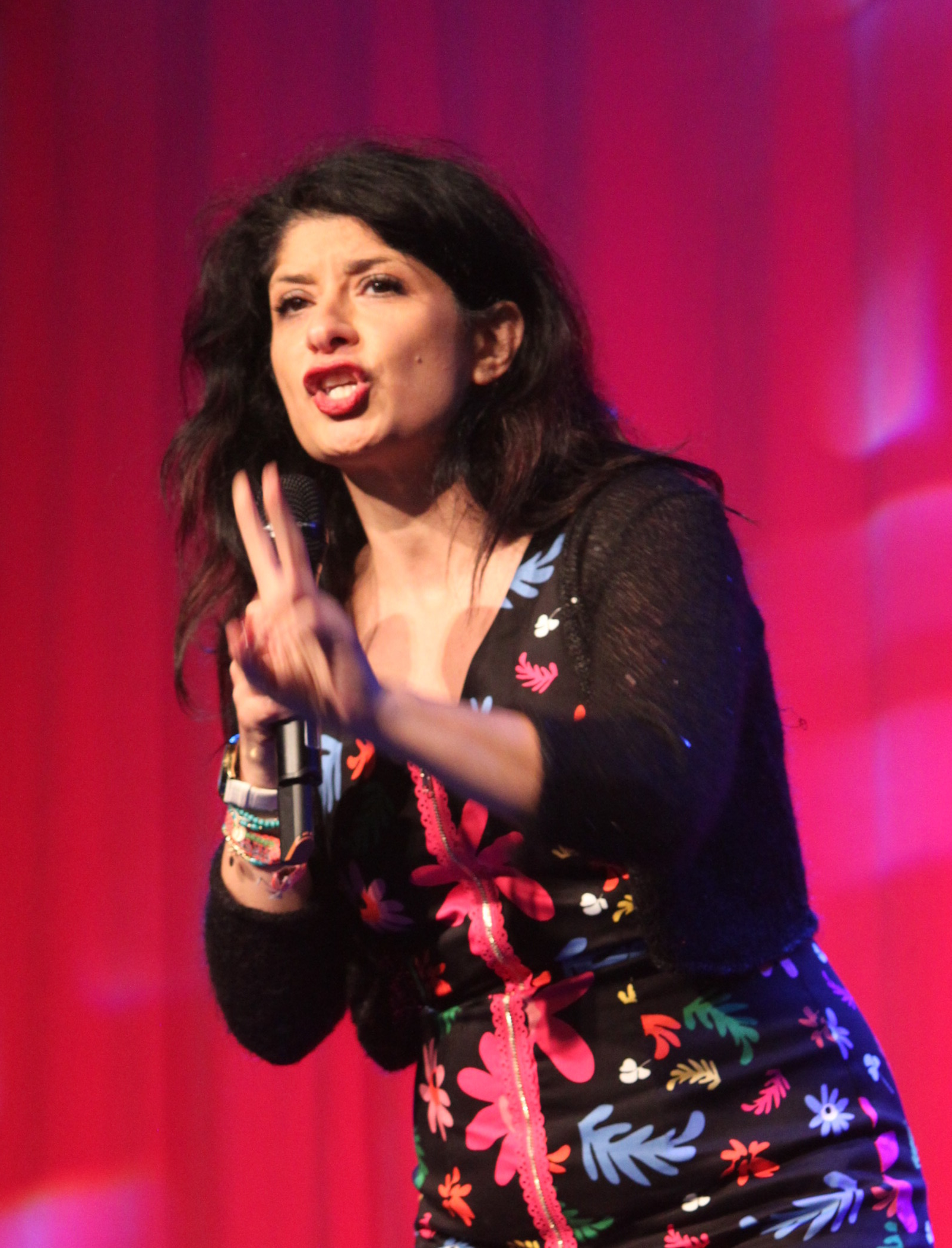
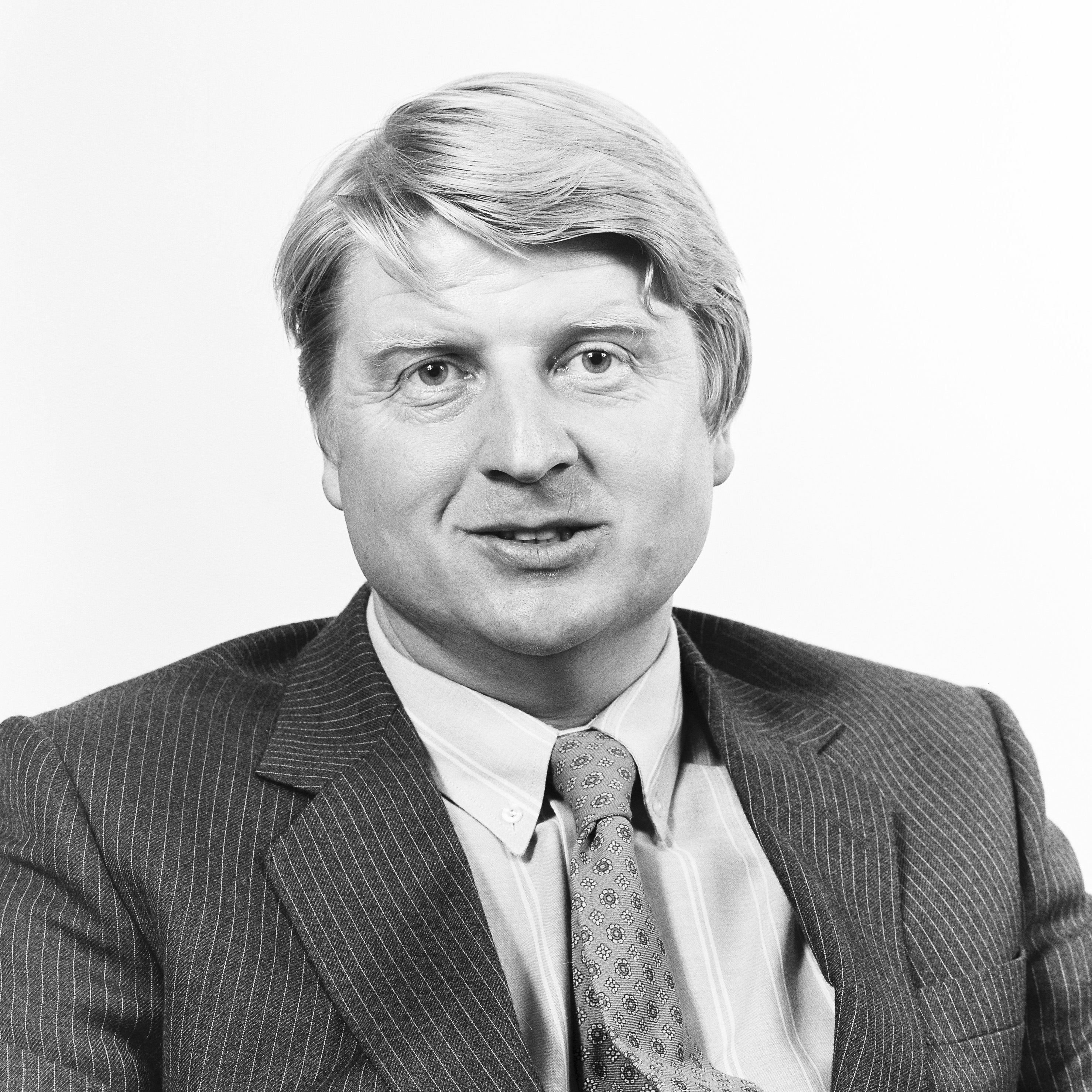
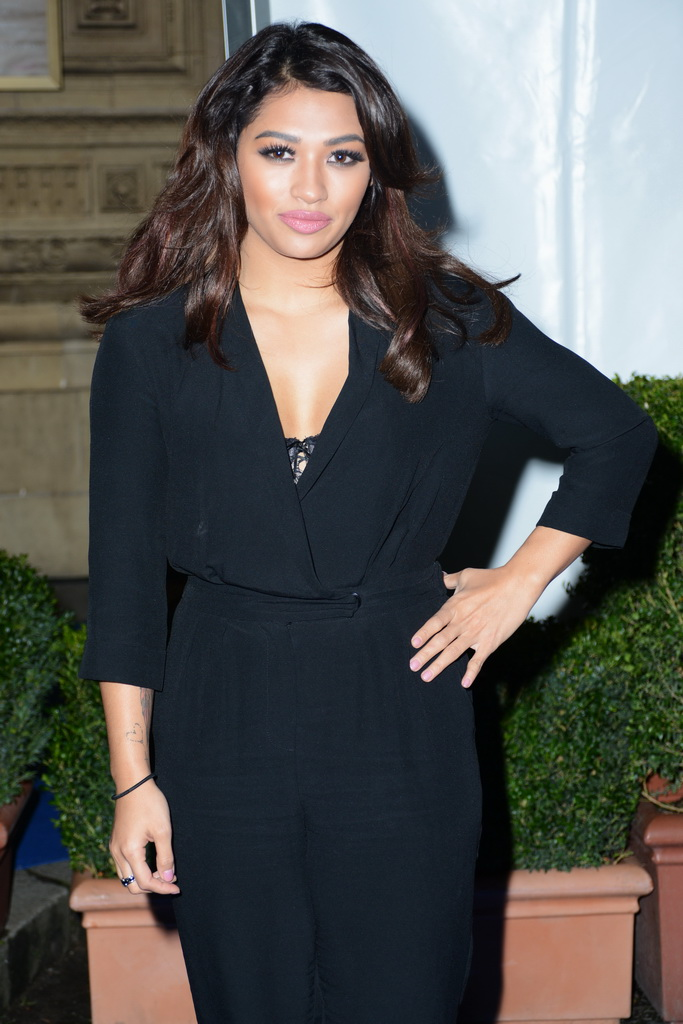
From left to right: Amir Khan, Dennis Wise, Iain Lee, Jamie Lomas, Kezia Dugdale, Rebekah Vardy, Shappi Khorsandi, Stanley Johnson, and Vanessa White.
Not pictured: Georgia Toffolo, Jack Maynard, and Jennie McAlpine.

Celebrity	Known for	Status
Georgia "Toff" Toffolo	Made in Chelsea star	Winner on 10 December 2017
Jamie Lomas	Hollyoaks actor	Runner-up on 10 December 2017
Iain Lee	Television & radio presenter	Third place on 10 December 2017
Jennie McAlpine	Coronation Street actress	Eliminated 8th on 9 December 2017
Amir Khan	Professional boxer	Eliminated 7th on 8 December 2017
Dennis Wise	Former England footballer	Eliminated 6th on 7 December 2017
Stanley Johnson	Politician, author & father of Boris Johnson	Eliminated 5th on 6 December 2017
Vanessa White	The Saturdays singer	Eliminated 4th on 5 December 2017
Rebekah "Becky" Vardy	Media personality & wife of Jamie Vardy	Eliminated 3rd on 4 December 2017
Kezia "Kez" Dugdale	Politician & former Scottish Labour leader	Eliminated 2nd on 3 December 2017
Shappi Khorsandi	Stand-up comedian	Eliminated 1st on 1 December 2017
Jack Maynard	YouTube personality	Withdrew on 21 November 2017

== Results and elimination ==
Indicates that the celebrity was immune from the vote
Indicates that the celebrity received the most votes from the public
Indicates that the celebrity received the fewest votes and was eliminated immediately (no bottom two)
Indicates that the celebrity was named as being in the bottom two
Indicates that the celebrity withdrew

Daily results per celebrity
Celebrity	Day 13	Day 15	Day 16	Day 17	Day 18	Day 19	Day 20	Day 21	Day 22		Trials	Dingo Dollar challenges
Celebrity	Day 13	Day 15	Day 16	Day 17	Day 18	Day 19	Day 20	Day 21	Round 1	Round 2	Trials	Dingo Dollar challenges
Toff	1st 31.51%	1st 31.82%	1st 33.29%	1st 38.29%	1st 36.78%	1st 40.55%	1st 43.49%	1st 49.49%	1st 65.22%	Winner; 71.41%	8	5
Jamie	2nd 18.47%	2nd 14.36%	2nd 11.88%	2nd 11.33%	4th 10.87%	4th 9.86%	4th 11.10%	3rd 15.85%	2nd 17.44%	Runner-up; 18.53%	7	6
Iain	Immune	5th 8.10%	4th 8.62%	3rd 10.17%	2nd 14.96%	2nd 21.51%	2nd 21.01%	2nd 19.53%	3rd 17.35%	Eliminated (Day 22)	7	4
Jennie	4th 10.77%	4th 8.65%	3rd 11.48%	4th 9.81%	3rd 11.44%	3rd 12.23%	3rd 14.88%	4th 15.12%	Eliminated (Day 21)		4	6
Amir	Immune	3rd 9.22%	5th 8.57%	6th 8.36%	6th 7.74%	5th 8.96%	5th 9.52%	Eliminated (Day 20)			5	3
Dennis	Immune	6th 8.05%	6th 7.24%	7th 7.69%	5th 10.51%	6th 6.88%	Eliminated (Day 19)				2	3
Stanley	3rd 11.28%	7th 7.57%	7th 6.96%	5th 8.37%	7th 7.70%	Eliminated (Day 18)					2	3
Vanessa	6th 6.34%	9th 4.50%	8th 6.42%	8th 5.99%	Eliminated (Day 17)						3	2
Becky	5th 10.44%	8th 6.06%	9th 5.53%	Eliminated (Day 16)							3	2
Kez	7th 6.24%	10th 1.67%	Eliminated (Day 15)								3	2
Shappi	8th 4.95%	Eliminated (Day 13)									0	1
Jack	Withdrew (Day 3)										0	0
Notes	None								1			
Bottom two (named in)	Kez, Shappi	Kez, Vanessa	Becky, Vanessa	Dennis, Vanessa	Amir, Stanley	Amir, Dennis	Amir, Jamie	None				
Eliminated	Shappi; 4.95% to save	Kez; 1.67% to save	Becky; 5.53% to save	Vanessa; 5.99% to save	Stanley; 7.70% to save	Dennis; 6.88% to save	Amir; 9.52% to save	Jennie; 15.12% to save	Iain; 17.35% to win	Jamie; 18.53% to win		
Eliminated	Shappi; 4.95% to save	Kez; 1.67% to save	Becky; 5.53% to save	Vanessa; 5.99% to save	Stanley; 7.70% to save	Dennis; 6.88% to save	Amir; 9.52% to save	Jennie; 15.12% to save	Iain; 17.35% to win	Toff; 71.41% to win		

== Bushtucker trials ==
The contestants take part in daily trials to earn food. These trials aim to test both physical and mental abilities. The winner is usually determined by the number of stars collected during the trial, with each star representing a meal earned by the winning contestant for their camp mates. As with the previous three years the public voted for who took part in the trials via the I'm a Celebrity... app, from iOS and Android devices.

The public voted for who they wanted to face the trial
The contestants decided who would face the trial
The trial was compulsory and neither the public nor celebrities decided who took part

Trial number	Air date	Name of trial	Celebrity participation	Public vote	Winner/ Win or Loss/ Number of stars	Notes
1	20 November	Critter-cal Rescue	Toff; Amir	19.72% 18.09%	Loss	1
2	21 November	Flushed Out	Amir	41.64%	Won	1, 2
3	22 November	Worst Dates	Becky; Toff	22.21% 18.29%	8/9 stars	None
4	23 November	The Battle For 10 Downing Creek	Iain; Kez	—N/a	Iain	3
5	24 November	The Fright House	Amir	20.77%	Amir	4, 5
5	24 November	The Fright House	Vanessa	—N/a	Amir	4, 5
6	25 November	The Temple of Gloom	Iain	24.51%	0/11 stars	2
7	26 November	The Hole	Becky; Jamie	22.41% 16.48%	11/11 stars	6
8 (Live)	26 November	Ant & Dec's Jungle Takeaway	Amir; Iain; Jennie; Kez; Stanley; Toff; Vanessa	—N/a	Amir; Iain; Stanley	7
9	28 November	Space Your Fears	Iain	21.86%	11/11 stars	6
10	29 November	Fear Factory	Stanley; ~~Becky~~; Kez	30.92% 13.65% 11.61%	5/11 stars	8
11	30 November	Kiosk Keith's Outbreak Refreshment Shack	Amir; Toff	13.77% 13.61%	9/10 stars	9
12	1 December	Grot Holing	Becky; Jamie	24.10% 15.27%	8/11 stars	10
13	2 December	Torturous Tanks	Dennis; Jamie	—N/a	6/10 stars	None
14	3 December	Car Cruel Karaoke	Jennie; Vanessa	—N/a	8/10 stars	None
15	4 December	The Snakes are High	Toff	—N/a	9/9 stars	None
16	5 December	The Temple of Gloom	Dennis	—N/a	8/8 stars	11
17	6 December	Tutankha-Doom	Jamie	—N/a	6/8 stars	12
18	7 December	The Deadly Departure Lounge	Iain; Jennie	—N/a	6/6 stars	None
19	8 December	Toxic Trauma	Jamie; Toff	—N/a	4/5 stars	None
20	9 December	Celebrity Cyclone	Iain; Jamie; Jennie; Toff	—N/a	4/4 stars	None
21	10 December	John Trevolting	Toff	—N/a	5/5 stars	None
22	10 December	Bushtucker Bonanza	Iain	—N/a	5/5 stars	None
23	10 December	Panic Pit	Jamie	—N/a	5/5 stars	None

=== Notes ===
- ^Note 1: This trial was for a meal ticket rather than for stars. If the task was won then all celebrities with meal tickets were able to eat an 'actual meal'
- ^Note 2: Becky and Stanley were excluded from the trial on medical grounds.
- ^Note 3: Iain and Kez were competing to become Jungle Prime Minister and have the best camp.
- ^Note 4: Iain chose Vanessa to compete against Amir in the trial.
- ^Note 5: After winning the trial, Ant and Dec announced that Amir had won 2 care packages for camp.
- ^Note 6: Stanley was excluded from the trial on medical grounds.
- ^Note 7: The celebrities were split into Boys and Girls. Each team picked two members to race across the Australian Bush for the grand prize of a feast. In the live bushtucker trial, the remaining teammates were playing for a headstart in the race.
- ^Note 8: Becky was ruled out of this task for medical reasons before she could participate. Kez, who received the third highest number of votes, took part instead.
- ^Note 9: Becky was excluded from the trial on medical grounds.
- ^Note 10: As they were on secret missions Amir, Dennis, Toff, and Vanessa were not eligible to be voted to do the trial.
- ^Note 11:This trial was originally attempted by Iain, but it was decided for it to be re-attempted by Dennis.
- ^Note 12: Jamie was playing for 8 stars with the 8th star being a drink for the campmates.

== Star count ==
Celebrity	Number of stars earned	Percentage
Georgia Toffolo	39/42 stars	92%
Jamie Lomas	44/54 stars	81%
Iain Lee	26/37 stars	70%
Jennie McAlpine	18/20 stars	90%
Amir Khan	9/10 stars	90%
Dennis Wise	14/18 stars	77%
Stanley Johnson	5/11 stars	45%
Vanessa White	8/10 stars	80%
Rebekah Vardy	27/31 stars	87%
Kezia Dugdale	5/11 stars	45%
Shappi Khorsandi		—N/a
Jack Maynard		—N/a

== Dingo Dollar challenges ==
Member(s) from camp will take part in the challenge to win 'Dingo Dollars'. If they win them, then they can then take the dollars to the 'Outback Shack', where they can exchange them, for camp luxuries with Kiosk Keith. Two options are given, and the celebrities can choose which they would like to win. However, to win their luxury, a question is asked to the celebrities still in camp via the telephone box. It is often joked that Ant & Dec make up these questions and their answers. If the question is answered correctly, the celebrities can take the items back to camp. If wrong, they receive nothing and Kiosk Keith will close the shack, and the celebrities will leave empty handed.

The celebrities got the question correct
The celebrities got the question wrong

Episode	Air date	Celebrities	Prizes available	Prize chosen	Notes
2	20 November	Becky; Dennis; Jennie	Tea; Biscuits	Biscuits	None
3	21 November	Stanley; Toff	Brownies; Meal ticket	Brownies	None
7	25 November	Jamie; Jennie	Fruit juice Chocolate-dipped fruit	Chocolate-dipped fruit	None
8	26 November	Kez; Toff	Salt & vinegar crisps Ice lollies	Salt & vinegar crisps	None
10	28 November	Dennis; Vanessa	Truffles; Twiglets	Truffles	None
11	29 November	Amir; Iain	Chocolate coins Strawberries & cream	Strawberries & cream	14
12	30 November	Jamie; Shappi	Marshmallows; Butter & crumpets	Butter & crumpets	None
15	2 December	Iain; Stanley	—N/a	—N/a	15
16	3 December	Amir; Becky; Dennis; Iain; Jamie; Jennie; Kez; Stanley; Toff; Vanessa	Various	Caramel & nut chocolate Cheese & crackers Chocolate; Clean socks Crumpets; Digestives; Fresh laundry Kez's care package	16
17	6 December	Jennie; Toff	Jamie & Iain's emails from home Popcorn	Jamie & Iain's emails from home	None
18	7 December	Amir; Jamie	Cupcakes; Toast & jam	Cupcakes	None
19	8 December	Jamie; Jennie	Birthday cake Ice cream & jelly	Birthday cake	None
20	9 December	Iain; Jamie; Jennie; Toff	Presents	Mince pies Gingerbread men Chocolate; Marshmallows	None

=== Notes ===
- ^Note 14: Amir & Iain ate their Prize before getting back to the camp.
- ^Note 15: As Iain and Stanley failed to complete the challenge, they weren't given a question to win a prize.
- ^Note 16: The celebrities all competed to win prizes from the Shack. As 9 of them successfully completed a challenge, they chose 9 prizes.

== Ratings ==
Official ratings are taken from Broadcasters' Audience Research Board (BARB).

Episode	Air date	Official rating (millions including HD and +1)	Rank
1	19 November	12.69	1
2	20 November	11.29	1
3	21 November	10.26	5
4	22 November	10.40	4
5	23 November	10.50	2
6	24 November	9.61	7
7	25 November	10.06	6
8	26 November	10.41	3
9	27 November	10.47	1
10	28 November	9.47	5
11	29 November	9.85	3
12	30 November	9.53	4
13	1 December	9.16	7
14	2 December	9.46	6
15	3 December	9.88	2
16	4 December	9.58	2
17	5 December	9.25	5
18	6 December	8.88	7
19	7 December	9.30	3
20	8 December	9.26	4
21	9 December	9.19	6
22	10 December	10.68	1
Series average	2017	9.96	—N/a
