= Tehran Von Ghasri =

American actor

- Tehran Von Ghasri in 2025
- Born: Washington, D.C., United States

Comedy career
- Years active: 2012–present
- Medium: Stand-up, film, television
- Genres: Observational comedy, Social commentary, Satire
- Subjects: Race relations; Iranophobia; Iranian culture; African-American culture; Middle East relations; Racial harmony; Religious tolerance; Cultural awareness; Antisemitism; Islamophobia
- Website: iamtehran.com

Tehran Von Ghasri, or simply Tehran Ghasri (Persian: تهران قصری, Persian pronunciation: [tehrɑːn ɢæsriː]), professionally known as Tehran formerly Tehran SoParvaz, is an American stand-up comedian, writer, actor, television, radio, and podcast personality. Born of African-American and Persian ethnic descent, Tehran was born and raised in Washington D.C. and surrounding Washington Metropolitan Area, beginning his career hosting events and presenting on local television stations. Tehran is multilingual, performing stand-up comedy primarily in English for US audiences but also Persian, conversational Hebrew, and Arabic internationally.

== Early life ==
Tehran Von Ghasri was born in Washington D.C. to an immigrant Iranian father and African-American mother. Named after Tehran, the capital of Iran, his parents chose the name "Tehran" as a reminder of his Persian roots.

Tehran's background includes a Muslim paternal grandfather and Zoroastrian paternal grandmother on his father's side and Christian maternal grandfather and Jewish maternal grandmother on his mother's side. Muslim, Zoroastrian, and Jewish culture were part of his upbringing. Tehran talks about receiving both the adhan and having a bar mitzvah on stage. His maternal grandmother is of Egyptian mizrahi descent.

Tehran graduated with honors with undergrad degrees in International Politics and Communications with a concentration in Mid-East Conflict, a Masters of Arts in Economics from George Mason University, afterwards attending law school graduating with a Juris Doctor (J.D.) degree. .

== Career ==
In a television show launched by VOA Persian called Minutes with Max Amini, he described his long-time friendship with Max Amini and said that Amini was his first motivator to be a comedian by putting him on stage in 2009. followed by a performance by Maz Jobrani at George Washington University in 2011 with Jobrani encouraging him to move to Los Angeles and pursue comedy full time which he did shortly after graduation.

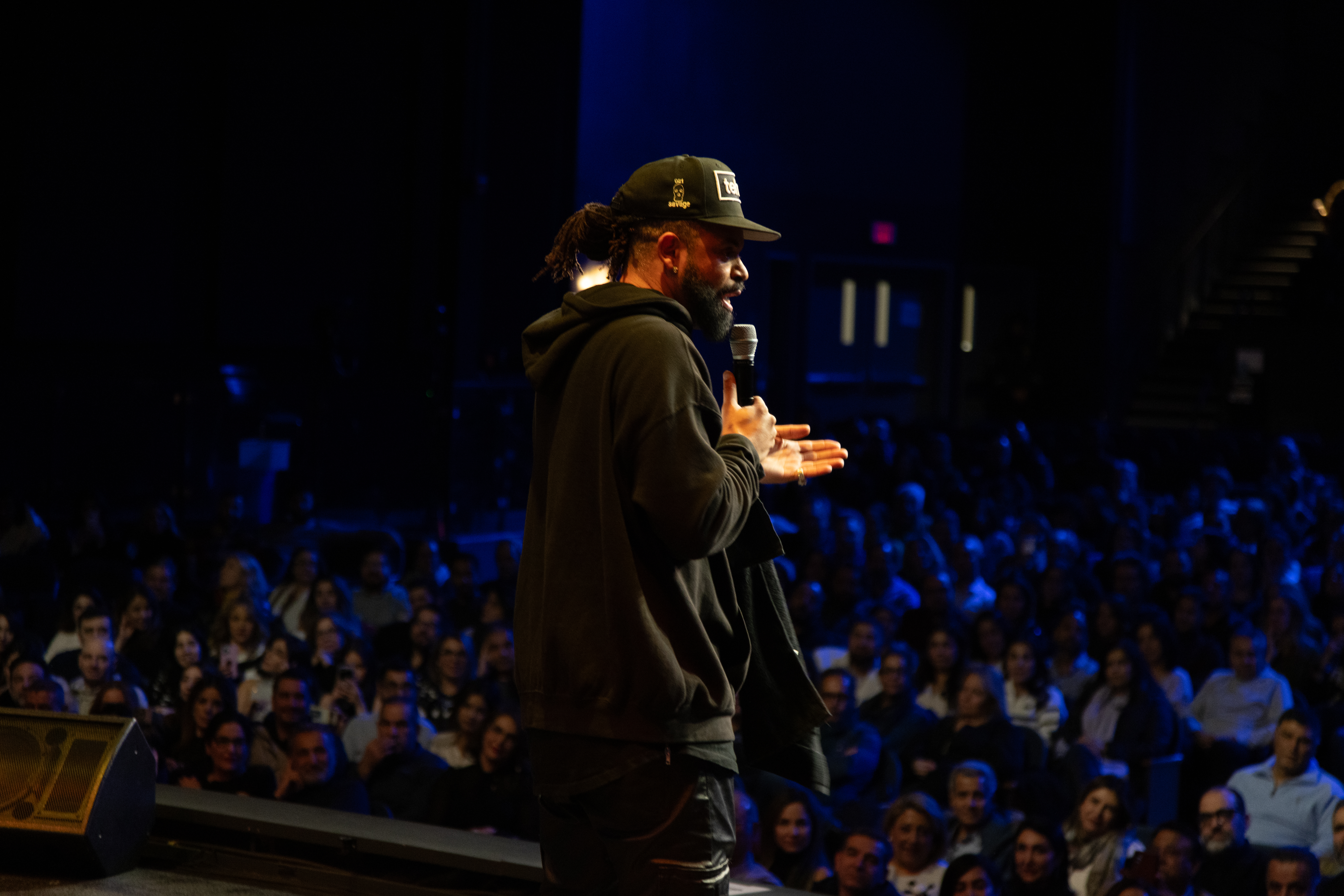
Tehran performing at The Meeting House, Oakville, Toronto, Ontario in February 2025

Tehran has hosted his own radio and television shows on Rangarang and Tapesh satellite television, which are US-based Persian language television channels. Tehran rose to popularity in the Iranian diaspora after appearing in the premiere episode of Parazit on VOA and has contributed to Persian trends and style.

In 2012, Tehran branched out, crossing over into the American and international markets with a radio program on Litt Live formerly Dash Radio. Tehran's debut on television was originally as a guest host, then becoming a main host and daily contributor on Take Part Live, the premier daily social commentary and political talk show on Pivot. This led to a role on the Fox nationally televised panel talk show "So Me".

Tehran has been in several TV and film projects including Dane Cook's American Typecast, the Sean Stone directed Fury of the Fist and the Golden Fleece, and featured in Maz Jobrani's project Jimmy Vestvood. Tehran has also been a main host on the national Fox "So-Me" panel show, daily host on Pivot's flagship show Take Part Live, The Young Turks, Indisputable with Dr. Rashad Richey, and regular on Fox Soul. Tehran has also hosted a variety of 'aftershows' including Fox's Empire, DC's Young Justice, Marvel's Agent's of S.H.I.E.L.D. and others. From 2015 - 2020, Tehran was a panelist on several episodes of AfterBuzz TV aftershow podcast for the American television series Agents of S.H.I.E.L.D. as well a variety of comic book related shows. Tehran hosted San Diego 2018 and Los Angeles Comic Con 2021.

Participating in Just For Laughs, Edinburgh Festival Fringe, and Netflix Is a Joke Festival, Tehran is a Los Angeles Laugh Factory regular and performs stand-up comedy in venues all over the world. Tehran created and hosts Comedy Bazaar, a Middle East and North African (MENA) themed weekly comedy show, as well as the inclusive Tehran Thursday which he headlines weekly at Laugh Factory in Los Angeles.

== Filmography ==
=== Film ===
Year	Title	Role	Notes
2015	Maul Dogs	Tehran Snipes	Supporting role
2016	Jimmy Vestvood: Amerikan Hero	D.J. at Wedding	Supporting role
2018	Fury of the Fist and the Golden Fleece	Count Blackula	
2019	American Typecast	Nick	
2024	Angels Fallen: Warriors of Peace	Barnabus	

=== Television ===
Year	Title	Role	Notes
2014	GGN: Snoop Dogg's Double G News Network	Kool-Aid Man	Episode: "GGN How to Be Kool - Snoop & the Kool-Aid Man"
2015	Get Your Life	Sketchy Waterer Guy	Episode: "Girl Get Your NYPTSD"
2018	Pennies for Your Thoughts	Charlie	
2018–2019	The Real Witches of West Hollywood	Ray J	

=== Other work ===
Year	Title	Role	Notes
2012	Shahs of Sunset	Himself	Episode: "Please Bring a Man"; Documentary
2013	@SummerBreak	Himself	2 episodes
2014	A Splash of Nowruz	Himself	Documentary short
2014	TakePart Live	Himself - Daily Contributor	86 episodes
2014	Revolt Live	Himself	Daily Contributor
2014	Speed Date Inn	Cool	Short film
2015	NOWRUZ: Lost and Found		Documentary
2016	SoMe	Himself	8 episodes
2017	Nowrooz 1396 Ceremony	Himself	TV special
2018	Travel Ban	Himself	Documentary
2018	Penny For Your Thoughts	Charlie	TV Series
2018	Fury of the Fist	Count Blackula	Film
2018	The Real Witches of Hollywood	Ray J	TV Series
2019	American Typecast	Nick	Film
2019	The Persian Bachelorette	Constestant	Short Film
2021	Friendz	Ahmad	TV Movie
2022	The Social Meltdown	Tehran Show Host	Short Film
2023	The Last King	Malek	Film
2023	Angel's Fallen: Warriors of Peace	Barnabus	Film

== See also ==
- Craig Robinson
- Dave Chappelle
- Matt Rife
- Max Amini
- Maz Jobrani
- Mo Amer
- Omid Djalili
- Ramy Youssef
- Shappi Khorsandi
- Tiffany Haddish
- Zarna Garg
- List of Iranian Americans
