= James Watt (entrepreneur) =

Scottish businessman and former CEO of BrewDog (born 1982)

- Born: 18 May 1982 (age 44); Fraserburgh, Scotland, United Kingdom
- Education: University of Edinburgh (LLB)
- Occupations: Businessman; investor; television personality
- Years active: 2007–present
- Known for: Co-founder of BrewDog
- Spouse(s): Johanna Basford (m. 2013; div. 2020) Georgia Toffolo (m. 2025)
- Children: 2

James Bruce Watt (born 18 May 1982) is a Scottish businessman and investor from Fraserburgh, Aberdeenshire. He is the co-founder and former CEO of BrewDog. As of 2024, his net worth is estimated to be over £400 million according to Sunday Times Rich List.

== Early life and education ==
James Bruce Watt was born on 18 May 1982 in Fraserburgh. Watt attended the University of Edinburgh where he studied law and economics between 2000 and 2004. During this time, he shared a flat with his school friend Martin Dickie, who was studying distilling at Heriot-Watt University. The two developed a shared interest in brewing.

== Career ==
=== Early career ===
After university, Watt briefly began training as a solicitor, but subsequently left that career. He became a professional fisherman, obtaining a deep-sea captain’s licence and spending much of his early twenties at sea. In his spare time, he began experimenting with brewing beer in his garage.

=== BrewDog ===
In 2007, Watt and Dickie founded BrewDog, a brewery and pub chain, in Fraserburgh, with Watt acting as CEO. In 2009, they opened their first bar in nearby Aberdeen. In 2011, BrewDog raised approximately £2 million through a crowdfunding shares offer. In 2012, they moved the main brewing operations to Ellon, Aberdeenshire, and ceased operations in Fraserburgh by 2014.

In 2016, BrewDog open-sourced its beer recipes to the public. In 2017, private equity firm TSG Consumer Partners acquired a 22% stake in the company for approximately £213 million. In the same year, Watt and the company announced the “Unicorn Fund”, a programme under which 20% of its annual profits would be given away, with 10% shared among employees and a further 10% donated to charities chosen by staff and small shareholders. In 2018, BrewDog announced its plan to build a $30 million brewery and tap room in Brisbane, Australia.

Under Watt and co-founder Dickie, BrewDog expanded from a small operation in a garage to become one of the UK's largest beer brands, using a combination of equity crowdfunding and a 2017 private-equity deal that valued the business at about £1 billion. In 2022 Watt announced that he would transfer a multi-million pound portion of his personal shareholding in BrewDog to salaried staff and introduce a bar profit-share scheme, under which bar workers would receive a share of the profits generated by their venues.

In recent years Watt and BrewDog have been the subject of controversies reported in the media. In May 2024, Watt stepped down as CEO after 17 years; he retained his shares and moved into a non‑executive position titled “Captain and Co‑Founder”. Watt was replaced by chief operating officer James Arrow. BrewDog's losses had doubled to £59 million in Watt's final year as CEO.

In July 2026, Watt launched a failed bid to regain control of Brewdog from Tilray through Second Best, a vehicle he set up to offer shares to thousands of "equity punks" who had bough shares in Brewdog but gained nothing from its eventual sale.

=== Television work ===
Watt appeared alongside Martin Dickie from 2013 on their reality TV show Brew Dogs on the American network Esquire, which lasted 3 seasons. After Esquire shut down in 2017, they launched SVOD service BrewDog Network, priced at $4.99 monthly. The networks initial PR campaign centred around the launch of beer.porn – a parody of a well-known pornography website – featuring content which drew criticism from industry observers and some shareholders. The network was relaunched in 2019 for free. As well as featuring Watt, its content includes originals featuring actress Alison Becker and Zane Lamprey, with acquired content featuring the likes of William Shatner and Curtis Stone.

== Controversy ==
Watt has been the subject of sustained media attention regarding BrewDog’s marketing practices and his personal conduct.

In 2024 Watt claimed that "entrepreneurs will abandon Britain" if capital gains tax rates were increased in the October 2024 UK budget. The rates were increased to 18% from 10% at the lower rate, and to 24% from 20% for higher earners, bringing them into line with the rates on property sales.

In July 2026, the Information Commissioner's Office confirmed it was "assessing" information related to complaints made against Watt for breaching data rules on contacting former BrewDog shareholders.

== Personal life ==
Watt splits his time between London and Ellon. In 2013, he married illustrator Johanna Basford; the couple have two daughters. They divorced in 2020. In 2022, Watt admitted to a "brief, amicable relationship with a team member" during a difficult period of his marriage.

In 2023, Watt brought a private prosecution against an ex-girlfriend relating to a bitcoin transaction. She was subsequently acquitted.

In 2024, he became engaged to media personality Georgia Toffolo, whom he had been in a relationship with since 2023. His attendance at Nigel Farage’s 60th birthday celebrations with Toffolo, and a subsequent LinkedIn poll about potentially delaying their marriage to maximise tax relief on an investment in her business, attracted criticism in the press and on social media. The pair wed in 2025.

He has disclosed diagnoses of autism and ADHD.

Watt and Dickie were awarded the MBE in 2016.

== Books ==
Business for Punks: Break All the Rules — the BrewDog Way (Penguin, 2016)
