= Persian satire =

Persian satire refers to satires in Persian literature.

== Early Persian satire ==
The Arabic poetic genre of hija (satirical poetry) was introduced after the Islamic conquest of Persia. The Greek dramatic genre of comedy was also later introduced after Aristotle's Poetics was translated into Arabic in the medieval Islamic world, where it was elaborated upon by Islamic philosophers from Persia, such as Al-Farabi and Avicenna Balkhi. Due to cultural differences, they disassociated comedy from Greek dramatic representation and instead identified it with the Arabic poetic form of hija. They viewed comedy as simply the "art of reprehension", and made no reference to light and cheerful events, or troublesome beginnings and happy endings, associated with classical Greek comedy. The term "comedy" thus became synonymous with "satire" in medieval European literature after the Latin translations of the 12th century.

Perhaps the most notable early Persian satirist is Obeid e Zakani (d. 1370 AD). His work is noted for its satire and obscene verses, often political or bawdy, and often cited in debates involving homosexual practices. He wrote the Resaleh-ye Delgosha, as well as Akhlaq al-Ashraf ("Ethics of the Aristocracy") and the famous humorous fable Masnavi Mush-O-Gorbeh (Mouse and Cat), which was a political satire. His non-satirical serious classical verses have also been regarded as very well written, in league with the other great works of Persian literature.

== Persian satire and constitutionalism ==
The Persian Constitutional Revolution coincided with the emergence of numerous legendary satirists and literary figures as Iraj Mirza, Ali Akbar Dehkhoda and Bibi Khatoon Astarabadi. Most satirists wrote their works in the form of poetry. Apart from Persian satire, Azeri satire had a strong presence during the revolution. Legendary Azerbaijani satirist, Jalil Mohammad Gholizadeh published his famous Molla Nasreddin weekly magazine in Tabriz during this period. He published the first very first cartoons in the history of Iranian cartoon art.

== Contemporary Persian satire ==
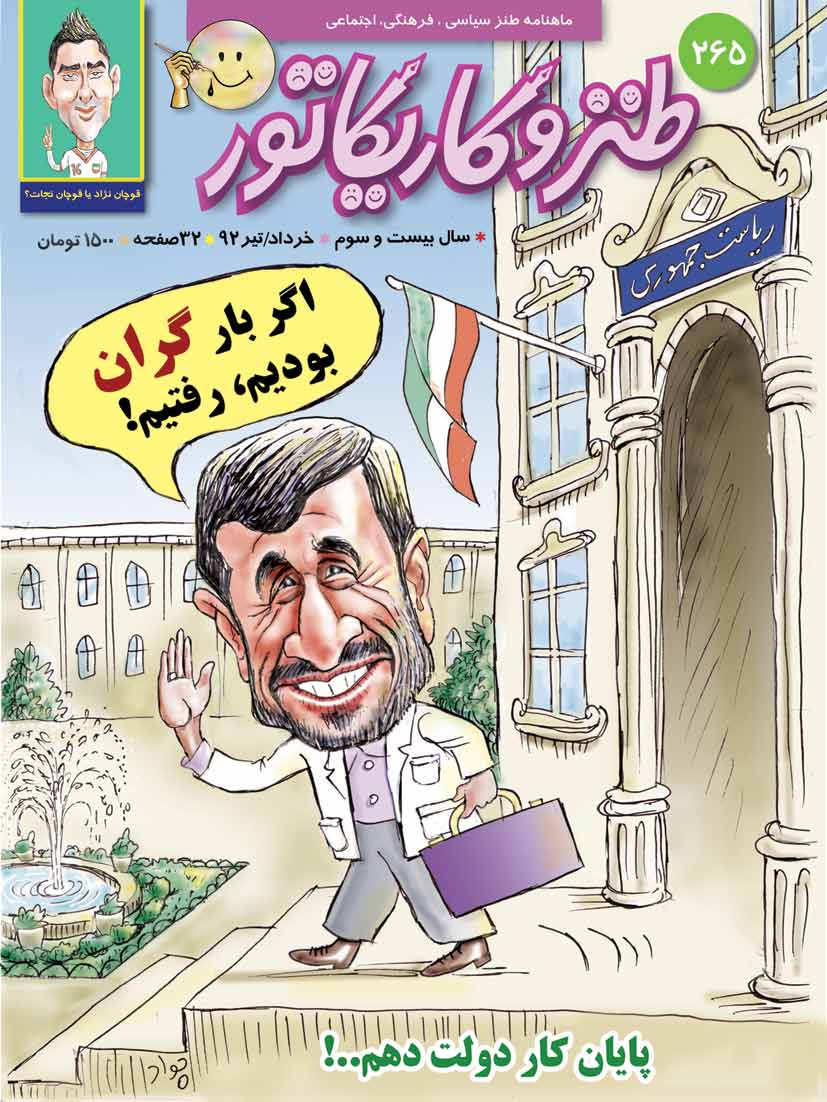
Tanz -o- Caricature (Humour & Caricature), founded by Javad Alizadeh is one of the leading magazine of satire in contemporary Iran

During the middle half of the 20th century, Towfigh Magazine became the pioneer of Persian satire, breaking all previous norms with very direct sharp attacks and jabs at the establishment - all the while within the confines of true satire in a country with no freedom of the press. Three brothers: Editor-in-Chief Hossein Towfigh, Hassan Towfigh and Abbas Towfigh turned Towfigh Magazine into the highest circulating and most popular magazine in Iranian history.

At the turn of the millennium, Persian Satire underwent a revolution with the works of Ebrahim Nabavi in Jame-eh daily. He offered a novel form of Persian satire in his work entitled "Sotoon e panjom".

The emergence and development of satire in Afghanistan is closely connected with political history. Mahmud Tarzi, Abdul Sabur Ghafory, Muhamad Yusof and Shaeq Jamal were perhaps the most notable satirists during the period 1873-1965. The period from 1965 to 1978 was the most productive, when different types of satire emerged and flourished in Afghanistan. In addition, an even larger amount of the same kind of work was imported from Iran.

== See also ==
- Persian literature
- Iranian stand-up comedy
- Nasreddin
