= Secret Garden: An Inky Treasure Hunt and Colouring Book =

- Author: Johanna Basford
- Language: English
- Published: 2013
- Publisher: Laurence King Publishing
- Publication place: United Kingdom
- Media type: Print
- Pages: 96
- ISBN: 978-1780671062

Secret Garden: An Inky Treasure Hunt and Colouring Book is a 2013 colouring book for adults by Johanna Basford. The book has 40 foreign versions and has sold over 8 million copies, becoming one of the best-selling books on Amazon.

Basford had been approached by Laurence King Publishing in 2011 after the publisher had seen Basford's work online. While the publisher originally wanted a colouring book for children, Basford proposed one for adults. Basford was inspired by several of her clients joking with her that they would enjoy colouring in her work, which was frequently done in black and white. Initially the publisher was reluctant to release such an unorthodox book. However, they eventually relented, and the first run quickly sold out. The book's success is frequently cited as starting the adult coloring book trend. The book is modelled after the Brodick Castle Gardens on the Isle of Arran, where Basford played as a child. By August 2015, Secret Garden had sold 6.8 million copies worldwide and launched the colouring trend for adults. In February 2015, Basford released a second book: Enchanted Forest: An Inky Quest & Colouring Book, and a third, Lost Ocean: An Inky Adventure and Colouring Book in October 2015.
