= Hadi Khorsandi =

Iranian writer (born 1943)

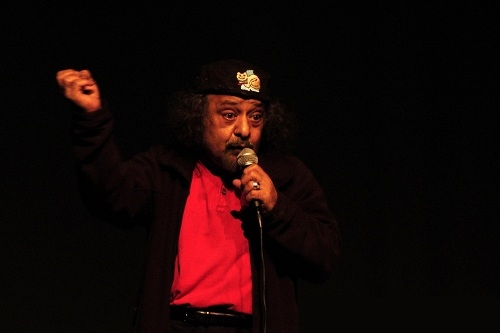
- Khorsandi in Amsterdam, 2010
- Born: 22 July 1943 (age 81); Fariman, Imperial State of Iran
- Occupation(s): Writer, poet, satirist
- Children: 2, including Shaparak Khorsandi
- Website: www.hadikhorsandi.com

Hadi Khorsandi (Persian: هادی خرسندی, born 22 July 1943) is an Iranian poet and satirist. Since 1979, he has been the editor and writer of the Persian-language satirical journal Asghar Agha. He is known for his examination of Persian socio-political issues and for openly criticizing the Iranian regime. He has lived in exile in London since the 1979 Iranian Revolution.

== Career ==
Khorsandi first wrote for Tawfiq when he was a high school student in Tehran. He was the subject of death threats during the 1980s.

Hadi Khorsandi's latest book is Tafrih al-Masaael. His other books are Sheraaneh and Yaad Daasht-haaye Mashkouke Alam and Aayeh-haaye Iraani.

== Personal life ==
Khorsandi is the father of comedian Shaparak Khorsandi and journalist Peyvand Khorsandi.

== See also ==
- Iranian stand-up comedy
