= Vigen (entertainer) =

Iranian singer (1929–2003)

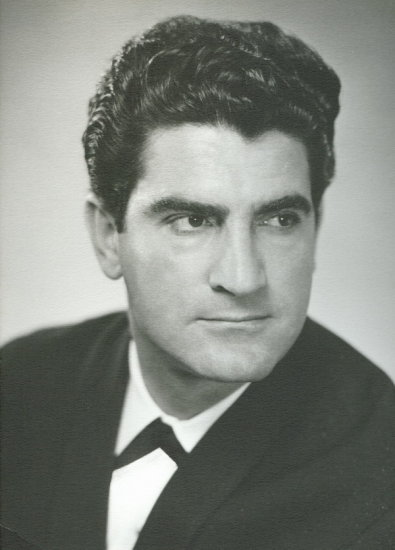
- Vigen in the 1960s

Background information
- Born: Vigen Derderian; 23 November 1929; Hamadan, Imperial State of Iran
- Died: 26 October 2003 (aged 73) Los Angeles, California, United States
- Genres: Rock; pop; jazz
- Occupations: Singer; actor
- Instruments: Vocals; guitar
- Years active: 1951–2001
- Labels: Avang Records; Caltex Records; Pars Video; Taraneh Enterprises Inc

Vigen Derderian (Persian: ویگن دردریان, Vigen Derderyân; Armenian: Վիգէն Տէրտէրեան, (Note: In classical orthography, which is in use by the Eastern Armenian-speaking Iranian Armenian community; Վիգեն Տերտերյան in reformed orthography.) Vigēn Tērtērian; 23 November 1929 – 26 October 2003) was an Iranian pop music singer and actor. He was known as the "King of Iranian pop" and the "Sultan of Jazz." He was an Iranian Armenian by ethnicity and sang in both Persian and Armenian.

During the golden age of Persian pop (the early 1970s) until the 1979 Islamic Revolution, many Iranian performers and celebrities—among them Delkash, Pouran, and Elaheh—yearned to be associated with him. He moved to the United States in 1971 and lived the rest of his life there.

Vigen's innovative and upbeat style of music had a great influence on paving the way for a new genre of Iranian music, influenced by Western European and Latin American styles. His musical and performing talents soon captured the attention of many prominent Iranian lyricists and composers such as Parveez Vakili(fa) and Kareem Fakkour(fa), and together they created some of Iran's most memorable songs.

== Early life ==
Vigen was born into an Iranian-Armenian family of eight children in the western Iranian city of Hamadan. His father died of complications related to pneumonia when Vigen was only eight years old. His mother and older brother Zaven raised him after moving away from the family property due to a family disagreement. His older brother Karo was a well-known Iranian poet and wrote the lyrics for Vigen's signature song, "Lala'ee" (Lullaby).

During World War II and following the Anglo-Soviet invasion of Iran, the family moved to the northern city of Tabriz where local Azerbaijani nationalists declared the area a separatist republic, with the help of the occupying Soviet forces. This is where Vigen bought his first guitar from a Soviet Armenian soldier and discovered his affinity for American, Italian and Spanish music and adopted many of those melodies for his songs with Persian lyrics that became some of Iran's most popular music to date.

== Artistic rising ==
In his mid teens, Vigen moved to Tehran and in 1951 he was hired to perform at the Café Shemiran, an upscale restaurant & bar on the northern outskirts of the capital city.

Equated to Elvis Presley by some fans in Iran, Vigen's debonair looks and his tall and athletic physique added to his appeal as Iran's first male pop star, particularly among young Iranian women at a time when ideas of emancipation and liberalism were taking hold in the 1950s and 60s. He was also one of the first Iranian entertainers to perform with a guitar.

== Later works ==
Vigen moved to the United States in 1971 and settled in California. He would return to Iran yearly to do concerts and perform in Vegas-styled nightclubs. After the Islamic Revolution of 1979, he was exiled to the United States because pop music was no longer allowed in Iran. He celebrated the 50th anniversary of his career at the Hollywood Palladium in Los Angeles in February 2001.

Some of his most notable songs are "Baroon Barooneh" (It's Raining), "Asb-e Ablagh" (Piebald Horse), The Groom شاه داماد, "Mahtab" (Moonlight), Lala'ee (Lullaby), "Gol-e Sorkh" (Red Rose), "Ragheeb" (Rival), "Simin-bari", "Awazekhan" (The Singer) and "Del-e Divaneh" (Crazy Heart). More than 600 songs were recorded during his long career.

== Film ==
Vigen's cinematic debut came in 1955 when he was discovered by the prominent Armenian-Iranian director Samuel Khachikian for a role in his film "Chaharrah-e Havades" (Crossroads of Incidents). In later years, he played roles in many other motion pictures by Khachikian and other producers, among them "Zalembala" (1956, Siamak Yasami), "Tappeh-eh Eshgh" (1959, Khachikian), "Arshin Malalan" and "Cheshmeh Oshagh" (1960, Samad Sabahi), "Atash Khakestar" (1961, Khosro Parizi), "Arooseh Darya" (1965, Arman). He later on founded "Vigen Film" to produce his own movies but did not pursue the enterprise.'

=== Filmography ===
Year	Original film title	English film title / translation	Notes
1955	Chaharrah-e Havades	The Crossroad of Events	Vigen's cinematic debut came in 1955, when he was discovered by the prominent Armenian-Iranian director Samuel Khachikian for a role in this film.
1955	Khoon va Sharaf	Blood and Honor	
1959	Tappe-ye Eshq	The Hill of Love	
1965	Aroos-e Darya	The Bride of the Sea	
1969	Atash va khakestar	Fire and Ashes	

== Personal life ==
His first wife was named Olga and they had three daughters together, including actress Aylin (also known as Eileen or Ailen), Aylin's fraternal twin sister, singer Jaklin Munns (also known as Jacqueline), and Katrin. His second wife was named Nadia and they had one daughter named, Evelyn, and one son named Edwin Derderian. His third wife was Karen Holston Derderian (1951–2015) and he had a step-daughter, Robin Navonne Brakefield.

== Death ==
Vigen died at home on 26 October 2003 from cancer and was buried at Pierce Brothers Valley Oaks Cemetery in Westlake Village, California. At the time of his death he had recorded more than six hundred songs, starred in six motion pictures and made guest appearances on various popular TV shows including The Bob Hope Specials, The Jack Benny Show and the TV series Mission Impossible.

== Discography ==
=== Select albums ===
- 1979 - Vigen
- 1984 - Hamkhooneh EP
- 1985 - Duets
- 1989 - Viguen Armenian Songs
- 1989 - Taraneh Man
- 1989 - Viguen 1 EP
- 1991 - 43 Viguen Golden Songs
- 1991 - Asb-e Som Tala
- 1991 - Kooleh Bar
- 1991 - Mahtab
- 1992 - Saghi
- 1993 - Zan-e-irooni
- 1995 - Shahdoomad
- 1996 - Soltan-e Eshgh
- 1997 - Be Yade Tehran
- 1998 - Bazgashte Dobareh
- 2006 - Viguen 2
- 2006 - Viguen 3
- 2006 - Viguen 4
- 2006 - Viguen 5
- 2006 - Best of Viguen
- 2008 - It's Raining
- 2008 - 40 Golden Hits of Viguen
- 2008 - Mahtaab
- 2008 - Dirooz Emrooz
- 2008 - Dokaboutar
- 2008 - Shah Doumaad
- 2008 - Ahanghaye Do Sedaiy
- 2008 - It's Raining
- 2011 - The Best Hits Vol 2
- 2011 - The Best Hits Vol 3

== See also ==
- List of Iranian musicians
- Music of Iran
- Persian pop music
- List of Iranian Armenians
- List of Iranian Americans
- Rock and alternative music in Iran
