= Jonathan Kesselman =

American screenwriter

- Born: 1974 (age 51–52); Los Angeles, California
- Education: University of Colorado Boulder; University of Southern California
- Occupations: Film director; screenwriter
- Years active: 2001-present
- Notable credit: The Hebrew Hammer

Jonathan Kesselman (born 1974) is an American film director, screenwriter, and producer, who first gained notice as the writer and director of The Hebrew Hammer (2003).

== Early life ==
Kesselman grew up in the San Fernando Valley in Los Angeles. He graduated from the University of Colorado Boulder with a degree in psychology, and then spent a few years working as an information systems consultant. He studied film at the University of Southern California School of Cinematic Arts, graduating in 2001 with a master's degree in film production.

== Career ==
=== The Hebrew Hammer ===
While at USC, Kesselman wrote and directed a short film version of The Hebrew Hammer, which screened at the 2000 Austin Film Festival. In 2001, ContentFilm offered to finance a feature film version, with Edward R. Pressman and John Schmidt on board as executive producers.

Kesselman wrote and directed The Hebrew Hammer, a "Jewxploitation" send-up of Blaxploitation and superhero films, starring Adam Goldberg as Mordechai Jefferson Carver, an Orthodox Jew on a quest to save Hanukkah from Santa Claus's evil son. It also stars Andy Dick, Mario Van Peebles, Nora Dunn, Peter Coyote, and Judy Greer, and has a cameo from Melvin Van Peebles reprising his role as Sweetback from Sweet Sweetback's Baadasssss Song (1971). It premiered at the 2003 Sundance Film Festival, had its television premiere on Comedy Central on December 8, 2003, and opened theatrically on December 19, 2003. It aired exclusively on Comedy Central for five years after its theatrical release, and is generally considered to be a cult film.

In 2005, Kesselman and Goldberg started discussing a sequel to The Hebrew Hammer, and Kesselman wrote the first draft of the script. In 2013, Kesselman and Goldberg first announced the sequel publicly. In The Hebrew Hammer vs. Hitler, the Hebrew Hammer comes out of retirement to combat racism, sexism, and anti-Semitism after an infomercial star becomes president of the US.

=== Jimmy Vestvood ===
Kesselman directed the 2016 political satire Jimmy Vestvood: Amerikan Hero, written by Maz Jobrani and Amir Ohebsion, and starring Jobrani as an Iranian traffic cop who moves from Tehran to Los Angeles to become a private investigator. It premiered at the 2014 Austin Film Festival, where it won the Comedy Vanguard Jury Award and the Audience Award for Comedy Vanguard Feature. It was released in theaters on May 13, 2016.

=== Other ===
Kesselman directed the 2013 TV pilot Grow, a comedy about a Los Angeles medical marijuana dispensary starring Jamie Hector and Dale Dickey. He wrote, directed, produced, and starred in the 2009-10 man on the street show On the Streets with Jonathan Kesselman on the Mother Nature Network website. He directed second unit for the 2016 war film Billy Lynn's Long Halftime Walk, directed by Ang Lee. He taught the seminar Writing Comedy for Film and Television at Yale University, and wrote the five-part series Writing in My Father's Footsteps, published in The Forward in 2009. It won second place in the Nefesh B'Nefesh category of the Simon Rockower Awards.

Kesselman was the showrunner on the six-episode 2020 sketch comedy series Gander, written by Rob Kutner and featuring Adam Goldberg, Lewis Black, Jay Mohr, Oscar Nunez, and Rachel Dratch.

== Filmography ==
=== Feature films ===
Year	Title	Credited as	Notes
2003	The Hebrew Hammer	Writer and director	
2016	Jimmy Vestvood: Amerikan Hero	Director	
2016	Billy Lynn's Long Halftime Walk	2nd unit director	Directed by Ang Lee
