= BrewDog =

Multinational brewery

BrewDog plc
- Type: Public limited company
- ISIN: GB00BDD97812
- Industry: Drinks industry
- Founded: 2007
- Founders: James Watt; Martin Dickie
- Headquarters: Ellon, Aberdeenshire, Scotland
- Area served: Worldwide
- Production output: 1,006,084 hectolitres (857,353 US bbl) (2023)
- Revenue: ▲£280 million (2024)
- Operating income: ▲£7.5 million (2024)
- Number of employees: 2,400
- Parent: Tilray
- Website: www.brewdog.com

BrewDog is a multinational brewery and pub chain based in Ellon, Aberdeenshire, Scotland. With production of over 100 million litres (200 million pints), BrewDog is the seventh-largest beer brand in Britain, and claims to be the "#1 Craft Brewer in Europe". As of 2023, the brand was available in 57 countries, with beers sold in over 129 bars and widely distributed internationally.

BrewDog, founded in 2007 by James Watt and Martin Dickie, opted not to invest in traditional advertising such as billboards or newspaper placements. Instead, the company employed a strategy centred on generating free media coverage through deliberately provocative campaigns, controversies, and publicity stunts. The company's UK and Ireland operations were acquired by the American company, Tilray, in March 2026.

== History ==
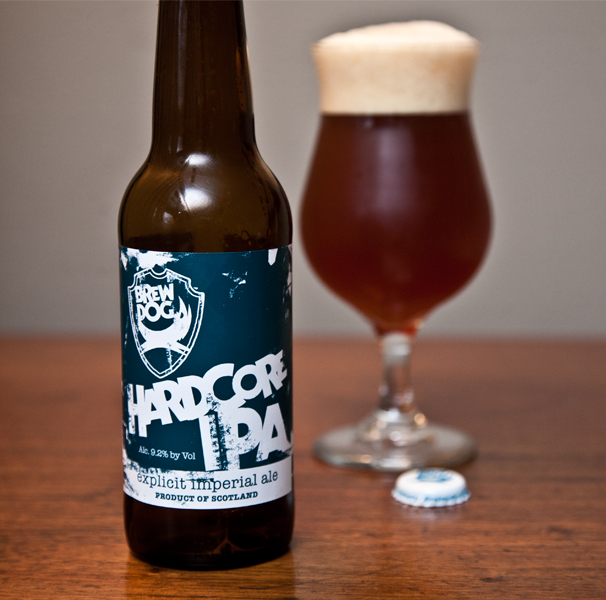
BrewDog's Hardcore IPA

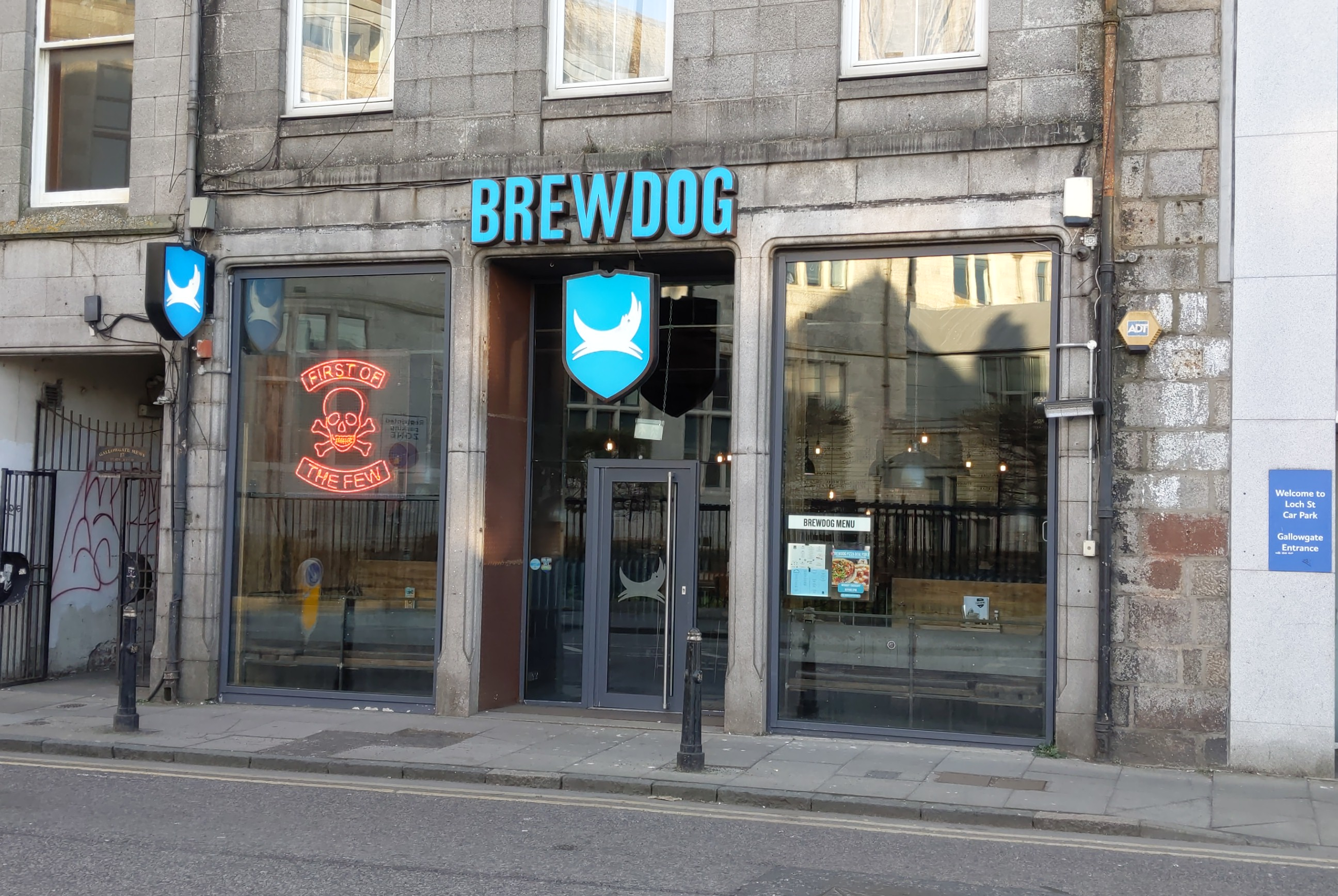
The first BrewDog pub located in Gallowgate, Aberdeen, pictured in April 2025

BrewDog was founded in Fraserburgh, Scotland, in 2007 by James Watt and Martin Dickie. Dickie had previously worked at Thornbridge Brewery, where he helped develop their flagship beer, Jaipur. In 2009, BrewDog purchased its first bar, in nearby Aberdeen. At the end of 2018, the company and its franchisees operated 78 bars worldwide.

In 2011, BrewDog, along with other industry stakeholders, participated in a campaign advocating for the allowance of new beer measures in Britain. 2011 also saw the company offered crowdfunding shares totalling £2 million, the equivalent of 8% of the capital of the company. The shares were sold at £23.75 and accompanied several benefits such as discounts in its bars and online purchase of its beers.

The main brewing moved from Fraserburgh to nearby Ellon in 2012. In 2014, the company ended operations in Fraserburgh. In January 2013, BrewDog opened its new 5 1/2-acre (2.2-hectare) brewery at a cost of £7.8 million just outside of Ellon. The brewery was designed to minimise carbon emissions with the use of treatment plants, biogas technology and since 2021, an anaerobic digestion plant. The effectiveness and overall impact of these measures have been a topic of industry discussion. In March 2015, BrewDog was awarded £1.5m in Regional Selective Assistance, a government grant available to businesses investing in job creation and economic development.

In 2016, the Ellon distillery was expanded at a cost of £5 million including the addition of a new 300 hectolitre (7,000 gallon) brew house. BrewDog open-sourced its beer recipes to the public. The decision also served as a marketing initiative to engage homebrewers and increase brand visibility.

In 2017, private equity firm TSG Consumer Partners acquired a 22% stake in the company for approximately £213 million. In 2018, BrewDog announced its plan to build a $30 million brewery and tap room on an 11,000 square metres (120,000 sq ft) greenfield site in the Metroplex complex at Murarrie, in Brisbane, Australia.

In 2019, the company announced a new distillery in the United States and opened its first bar in Ireland, at the Capital Dock development in the upmarket Grand Canal Dock area of Dublin.

On 6 January 2020, BrewDog opened BrewDog AF, an alcohol-free bar on Old Street in Shoreditch, London. It closed in 2022, by which point it had abandoned the alcohol-free concept.

In 2021, BrewDog launched a new visual identity. In 2022, they expanded their Australian operations, opening another bar in Fortitude Valley, Brisbane. Further bars followed in South Eveleigh in Sydney, Coburg in Melbourne and Perth. In December 2022, BrewDog auctioned the first 50 casks of its single malt and single grain whiskies.

In February 2023, BrewDog launched a partnership with Budweiser China and the expansion to that country's market.

In May 2024, James Watt stepped down as chief executive officer of BrewDog after 17 years in the role. He transitioned to a newly created non-executive position entitled "Captain and Co-Founder", remaining involved in the company's strategic direction while retaining his equity stake. He was succeeded by chief operating officer James Arrow.

In March 2025, BrewDog announced the appointment of James Taylor as chief executive officer and Lauren Carrol as chief operating officer, following the departure of James Arrow, who stepped down for personal reasons. The leadership changes took effect immediately.

In June 2025, BrewDog reported a return to profitability for the first time since 2021, with adjusted earnings before tax of £7.5 million. For the year ending 31 December 2024, the company recorded gross revenues of £357 million and net revenues of £280 million.

On 22 July 2025, BrewDog announced that it would close 10 locations in the UK, including its original branch in Aberdeen, on the following Saturday, 4 days later. The company described the closures as part of a strategy to "redefine the bar division's focus for long-term and profitable growth" in light of regulatory and financial issues affecting the hospitality industry. The trade union Unite called the short notice periods "morally repugnant" and "potentially unlawful".

In January 2026, the BrewDog distillery in Ellon was closed with the company ceasing production of all spirits.

On 2 March 2026, the company's UK and Ireland operations were acquired by the American pharmaceutical, cannabis and consumer packaged goods company, Tilray, for £33 million, as part of a pre-pack administration deal. As part of the deal it was announced that 38 bars would close with the loss of nearly 500 jobs. Brewdog founder, James Watt, commented on the deal stating he was "heartbroken".

British food think tank the Food Policy Institute subsequently warned of the potential impacts the BrewDog sale might have on craft beer investing in the UK.

== Marketing campaigns ==
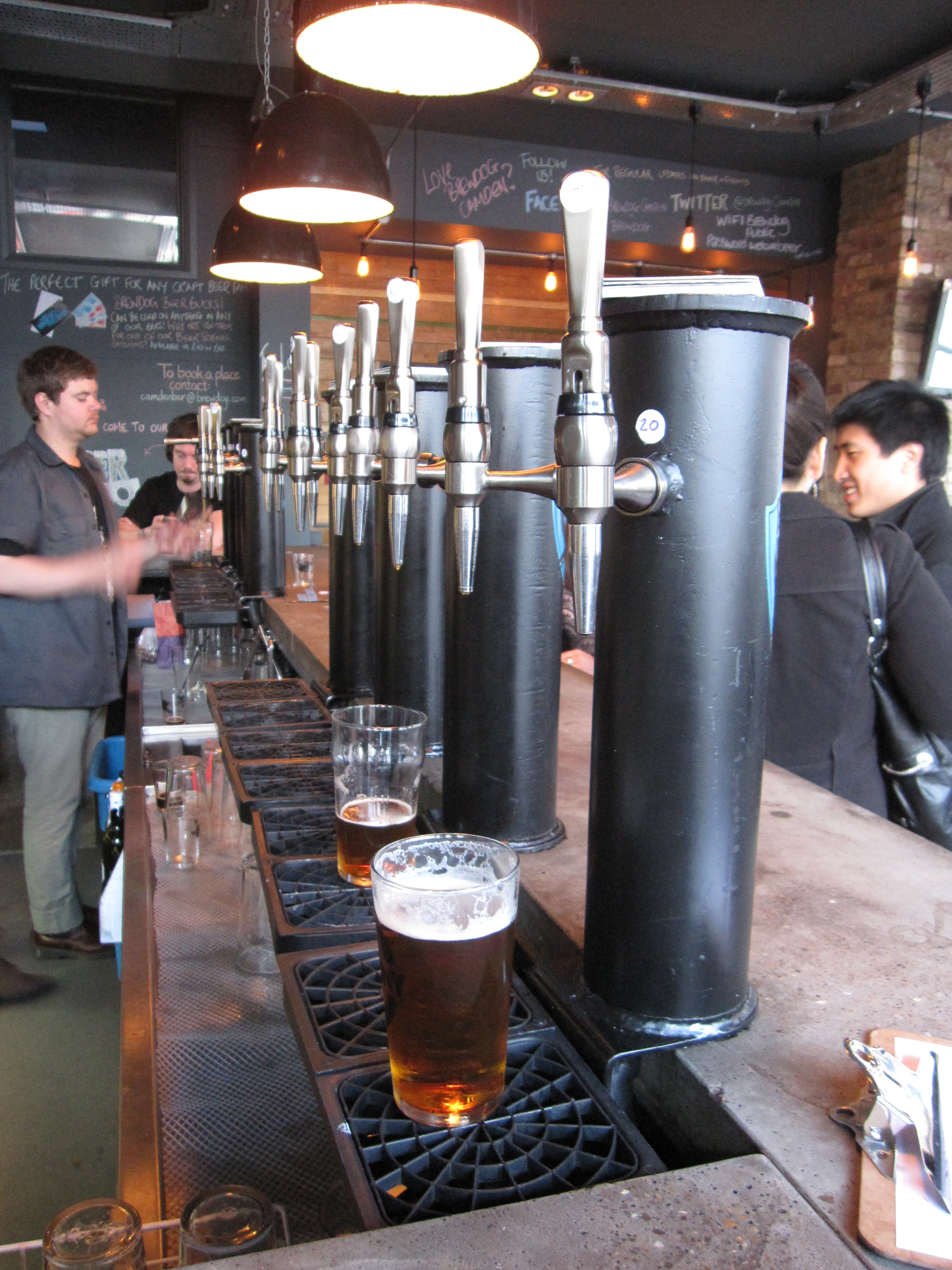
BrewDog bar in Camden

In 2008, BrewDog was accused of aggressive marketing by UK drinks industry watchdog the Portman Group and risked having its products withdrawn from British shops. BrewDog denied these allegations. In December 2008, BrewDog was cleared of all breaches of Portman's code of practice and permitted to continue marketing its products without making any changes to the packaging. BrewDog launched a beer named Speedball in 2009, referencing a drug cocktail, which was then renamed Dogma after being banned.

In 2014, Portman claimed BrewDog was in breach of Portman's Code of Practice "for encouraging both anti-social behaviour and rapid drinking" through the labelling of the Dead Pony Club IPA, which it claimed placed "undue emphasis on the strength and intoxicating effect of the alcohol in the product".

In September 2015, BrewDog was criticized for mocking homeless people, trans women and sex workers, leading the company to launch a "non-binary, transgender beer".

In March 2018, BrewDog produced Pink IPA, a limited edition bottling of Punk IPA. The beer breached Portman's Code of Conduct, upholding that the phrase "Beer for Girls" used on the packaging was likely to appeal to under-18s. BrewDog ignored Portman's remark. In 2020, BrewDog CEO Watt admitted that Pink IPA was a mistake.

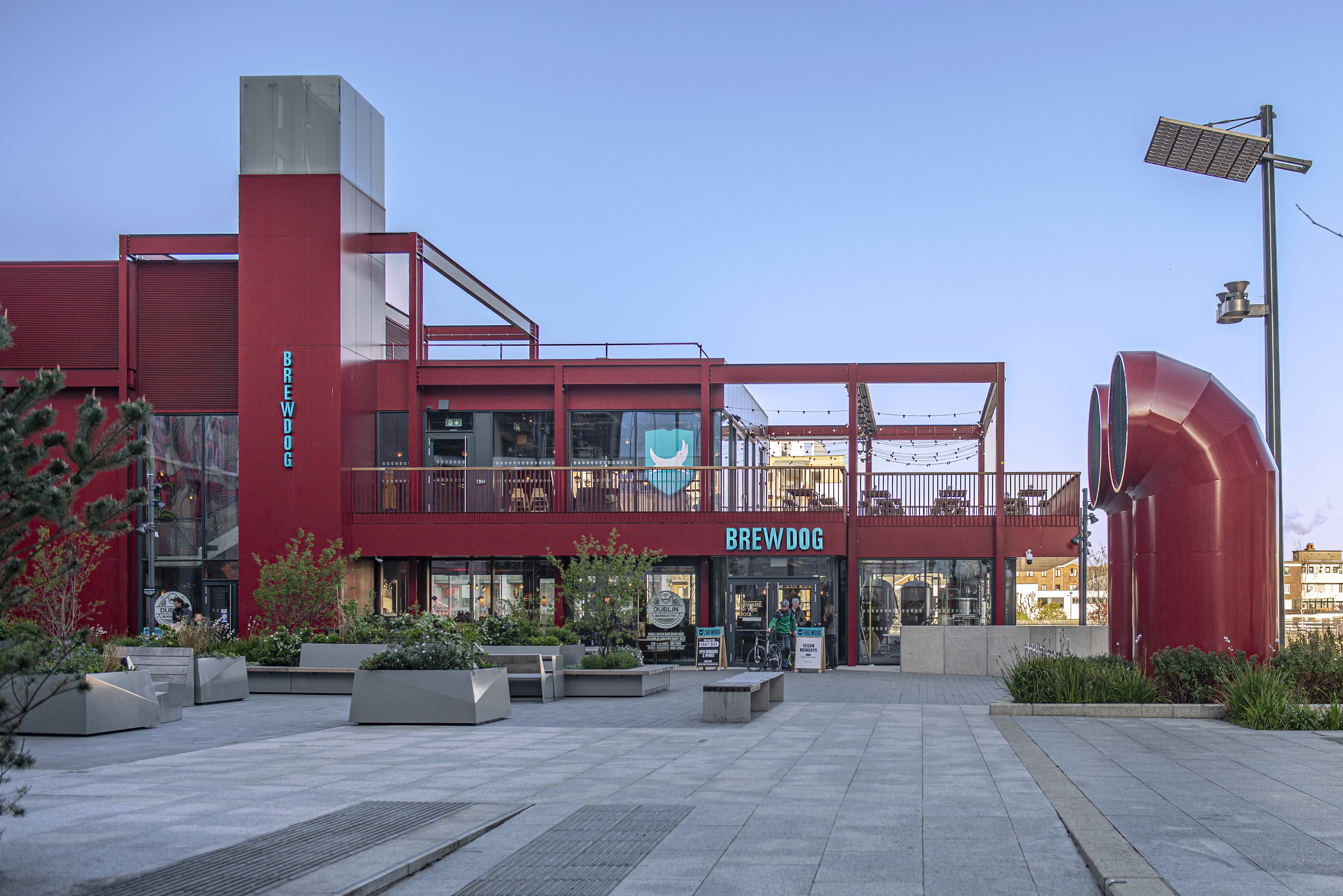
BrewDog Outpost Dublin

In June 2021, BrewDog came under investigation by the Advertising Standards Authority (ASA) concerning the company's claim in three of 50 promotional tweets that ten 24 carat solid gold beer cans, randomly hidden in cases of beer, were worth £15,000. Some winners had their cans independently valued, uncovering that their cans were not solid gold as advertised in those tweets and were indeed gold-plated brass, valued at the lower price of £500. Watt contacted the 50 winners to offer a full cash amount, subsequently buying 40 of the cans out of his own money at a cost of £470,000.

In July 2021, a BrewDog advert was banned by the ASA for "misleading claims". An Instagram post for its Clean & Press Hard Seltzer stated, "Due to advertising regulations we cannot claim this drink is healthy", but continued with a reference to a low calorie claim. The ASA challenged the nutritional benefits of the drink claimed in the advert.

In November 2022, BrewDog announced an "anti-sponsorship" of the 2022 FIFA World Cup, criticising Qatar for their mistreatment of migrant workers and criminalisation of homosexuality. The company also stated that profits raised from the sale of Lost Lager during the duration of the tournament would be donated to help fight human rights abuses. The Unite union accused BrewDog of hypocrisy, highlighting the company's own controversies regarding its treatment of employees. It was also pointed out by multiple news outlets that despite this stance, BrewDog still showed the event in their bars and that their beer was still being sold in Qatar.

== Strongest beer claims ==
BrewDog has produced progressively stronger beers and has claimed to have made the 'strongest beer ever brewed' more than once. In 2009, its Tokyo* brew, with 18.2% alcohol by volume (ABV), caused controversy when Portman criticised the availability of a beer of that strength in 330 ml bottles with traditional crown caps. BrewDog also launched a beer called Tactical Nuclear Penguin, with 32% ABV, which was claimed to be the strongest beer ever made.

In 2010, BrewDog announced Sink The Bismarck, an apparent 41% ABV. Also in 2010, BrewDog produced a 55% ABV freeze-distilled beer called The End of History, with the bottles packaged in small taxidermied animals, priced at £500 and £700 each. Only 12 bottles were produced; 11 for retail sale, with the other one going to video blog BeerTapTV. BrewDog marketed The End of History as one of the strongest and most expensive beers ever produced, though similar high-strength beers have since been released by other breweries. Advocates for Animals called the gimmick "perverse".

The title "strongest beer of the world" was then reclaimed by Georg Tscheuschner from Schorschbräu, whose Schorschbock 57 had an ABV of 57.5%. The title for world's strongest beer has since been claimed again by Brewmeister's Snake Venom at a reputed 67.5%.

== Legal issues ==
In March 2017, BrewDog threatened legal action against an independent pub based in Birmingham called Lone Wolf, a trademark owned by BrewDog. A day later, after the story was reported in The Guardian, BrewDog director Watt tweeted that the company had no issue with the bar using the name, despite it having already rebranded as The Wolf. However, BrewDog released a statement at a later date saying "Hands up, we made a mistake in how we acted", blaming "trigger happy lawyers". The next day, further controversy arose over an alleged previous threat of legal action from BrewDog against a bar calling itself Draft Punk. In response to this, a spoof cease and desist letter, asking BrewDog to stop using the term "punk", was signed by over 200 punk bands, labels and promoters from around the world. BrewDog's Watt later released a blog statement citing the allegation as inaccurate, calling it an example of "opportunistic lies combined with inaccurate journalism", noting that BrewDog does also own a trademark on the word 'punk' related to beer.

In 2017 and 2020, BrewDog lost legal and trademark battles to Elvis Presley's estate and Elvis Presley Enterprises over BrewDog's IPA product Elvis Juice and BrewDog's attempt to trademark "Elvis Juice" and "BrewDog's Elvis Juice". They won an appeal to use "BrewDog Elvis Juice" in the United Kingdom but lost an appeal to use the name in the European Union.

In May 2019, BrewDog was accused of stealing marketing concepts from public relations firm Manifest London, and from job applicants using fake interviews and other deceptive practices.

== Employee relations ==
In June 2021, a group of over 100 former BrewDog employees published an open letter criticising the firm's business practices and the treatment of its employees. The letter cited a "culture of fear" and claimed the company was "built on a cult of personality", with founder and CEO Watt singled out for particular criticism.

In January 2022, an episode of BBC One investigative series Disclosure interviewed "former employees who say they found it a miserable and uncomfortable experience", and "some loyal customers [who] now say they regret investing their savings in BrewDog". After the scandal, they lost their B Corporation certification. The Guardian later revealed that Watt had hired private investigators to obtain information on people he believed were propagating a smear campaign against him. In February 2024, Ofcom dismissed BrewDog's claim that the BBC's documentary had unfairly targeted the company with a "hatchet job".

In January 2024, BrewDog announced that it would no longer pay the "real living wage" from April 2024.

In March 2024, staff from BrewDog's flagship Waterloo bar signed an open letter to the company stating their working conditions were unacceptable and that little had changed since BrewDog's commitment to improve was made in 2021.

== TV series ==
James Watt and Martin Dickie had a show in 2013 on American television channel Esquire Network which lasted three seasons. After the channel closed, BrewDog launched BrewDog Network, which features a selection of original content. The BrewDog Network launch PR campaign centred around beer.porn, a parody of a pornography website, which drew further criticism of sexism and misogyny.

== Awards ==
=== Product ===
- 2007: World's Best Strong Pale Ale (Sub Category Winner) for The Physics by the World Beer Awards.
- 2007: World's Best Imperial Stout (Style Trophy Winner) for Rip Tide by the World Beer Awards.
- 2008: Gold medal at the 2008 World Beer Cup in the Wood and Barrel-aged Strong Beer Category for Paradox Grain.
- 2010: Gold at the 2010 World Beer Cup in the Imperial IPA category for Hardcore IPA.

=== Corporate ===
- 2008: Prince's Scottish Youth Business Trust Young Entrepreneur of the Year award.
- 2008: Tenon Entrepreneur of the Year Award at the National Business Awards for Scotland.
- 2019: One-star accreditation with a BCI score of 666.2.
