= Shaparak Khorsandi =

Iranian-born British comedian (born 1973)

- شاپرک خرسندی
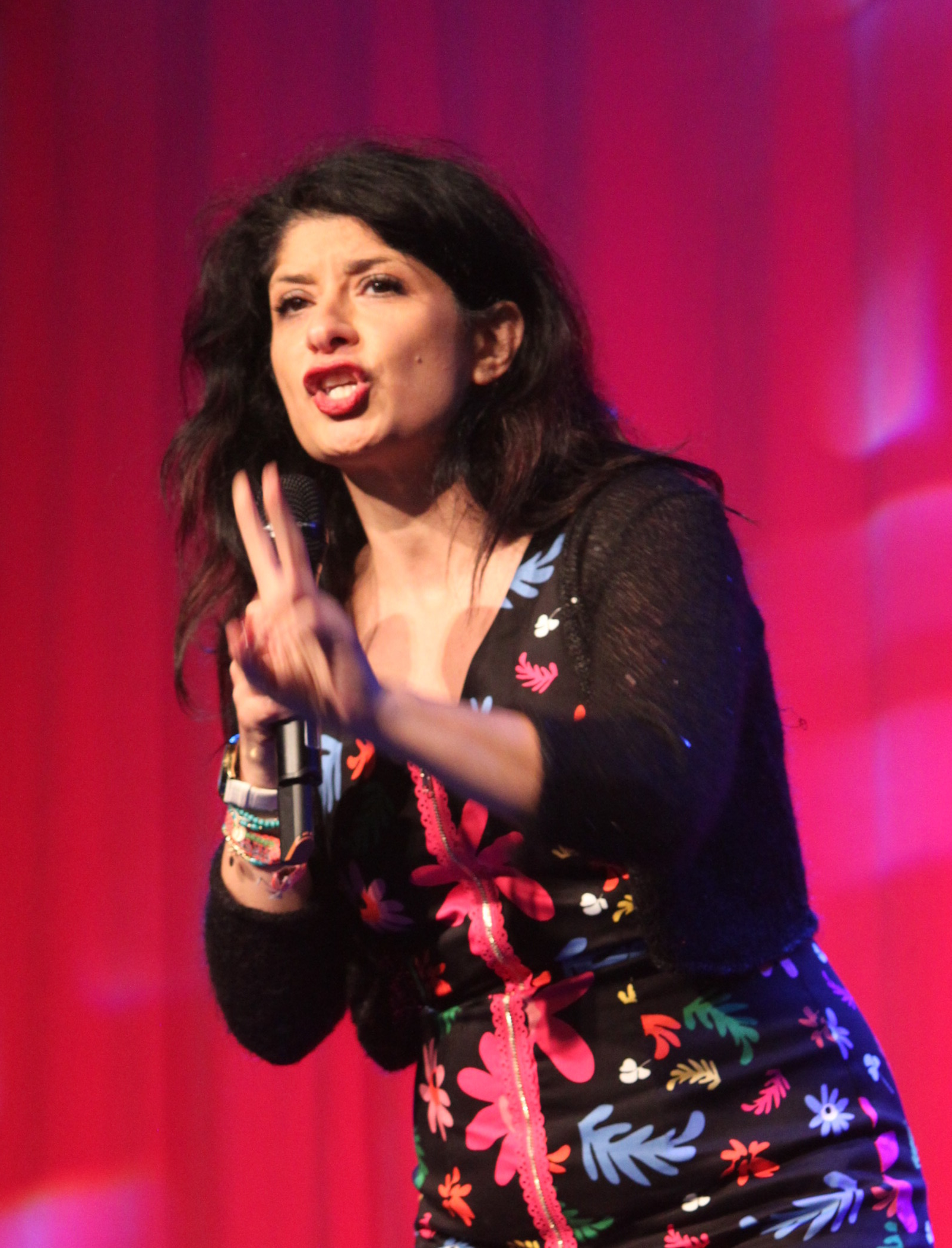
- Khorsandi at Glastonbury Festival in 2015
- Born: 8 June 1973 (age 53); Tehran, Iran
- Notable work: Live at the Apollo; Michael McIntyre's Comedy Roadshow; I'm a Celebrity...Get Me Out of Here!
- Spouse: Christian Reilly (m. 2005; div. 2011)
- Children: 2
- Parent: Hadi Khorsandi (father)

Comedy career
- Medium: Stand-up, television
- Subjects: Everyday life, Iranian culture, British politics
- Website: shappi.co.uk

Shaparak Khorsandi (Persian: شاپرک خرسندی, Persian pronunciation: [ʃɑːpæræk xorsændiː]; born 8 June 1973), who previously performed as Shappi Khorsandi, is an Iranian-born British comedian and author. She is the daughter of the Iranian political satirist and poet Hadi Khorsandi.

Her family left Iran for the United Kingdom following the 1979 revolution, and she frequently references her Iranian heritage and reactions to it in her stand-up comedy performances. Khorsandi rose to national prominence after her 2006 Edinburgh Festival Fringe show Asylum Speaker and her appearance at the Secret Policeman's Ball two years later. She has featured on numerous British television and radio programmes, including the BBC Radio 4 programme Shappi Talk (2009 and 2010), and I'm a Celebrity...Get Me Out of Here! in 2017.

Khorsandi has authored several books. Her memoir A Beginner's Guide to Acting English was published in 2009. Her first novel, Nina is Not OK, was published in 2016, and her young adult fiction novel Kissing Emma, was published in 2021. The autobiographical Scatter Brain followed in 2023.

== Early life and education ==
Shaparak Khorsandi was born on 8 June 1973 in Tehran. Her parents were Fatemah, and the satirist and poet Hadi Khorsandi. The family fled Iran to London after the Islamic Revolution after her father made a joke that was seen as critical of the revolutionary regime. Khorsandi graduated from King Alfred's College, now the University of Winchester, in 1995, with a drama, theatre, and television degree. After graduating, she worked in various roles, including at a community theatre, in a sandwich shop, as a telephone fundraiser, and as a nude life model, whilst starting her career as a stand-up comedian. In 2010, the university awarded her an honorary doctorate.

She originally performed professionally as Shappi Khorsandi. Khorsandi explained her decision to use her full name, Shaparak, professionally in The Independent. Having had her full name mocked and mispronounced when she was a child, she decided to be known as "Shappi" from the age of 16, but she eventually decided that this was an attempt "to bend in a direction which would make my foreignness more comfortable for other people", and chose to revert to using her full name.

== Career in comedy ==
Khorsandi performs stand-up comedy, and appeared at Joe Wilson's Comedy Madhouse in 1997. She frequently references her Iranian heritage and reactions to in her comedy performances. In 2000, she was runner-up in the Hackney Empire New Act of The Year, and William Cook of The Guardian found her "feisty self-mockery" to be "refreshing ... with something new to say and a new way of saying it". That summer, she debuted at the Edinburgh Festival Fringe in the three-person show Pablo Diablo's Cryptic Triptych, performing between ventriloquist Mark Felgate and Russell Brand. The same year, she was nominated for the BBC New Comedy Award.

A short, 2004 preview in The Times read that Khorsandi's act "uses her turbulent background to confident, creative effect". Her 2006 show at the Edinburgh Festival Fringe, Asylum Speaker, drew on her experience of leaving Iran and her fear upon learning of death threats to her father. Mark Monahan of The Daily Telegraph praised the show as "lively, ambitious and interesting," although he felt that the second half of the show was not as funny as the first. Jasper Gerard of The Sunday Times called Khorsandi the "surprise hit" of the Fringe. Theatre academics Elaine Aston and Geraldine Harris later wrote that this show was the "act that brought her wide media attention". Reflecting on her career up to 2010, they noted that a key aspect of Khorsandi's comedy was that "her humour resonates with common experiences of racially marked prejudice and 'othering', but is rooted in the specificities of her own, lived, migratory experiences".

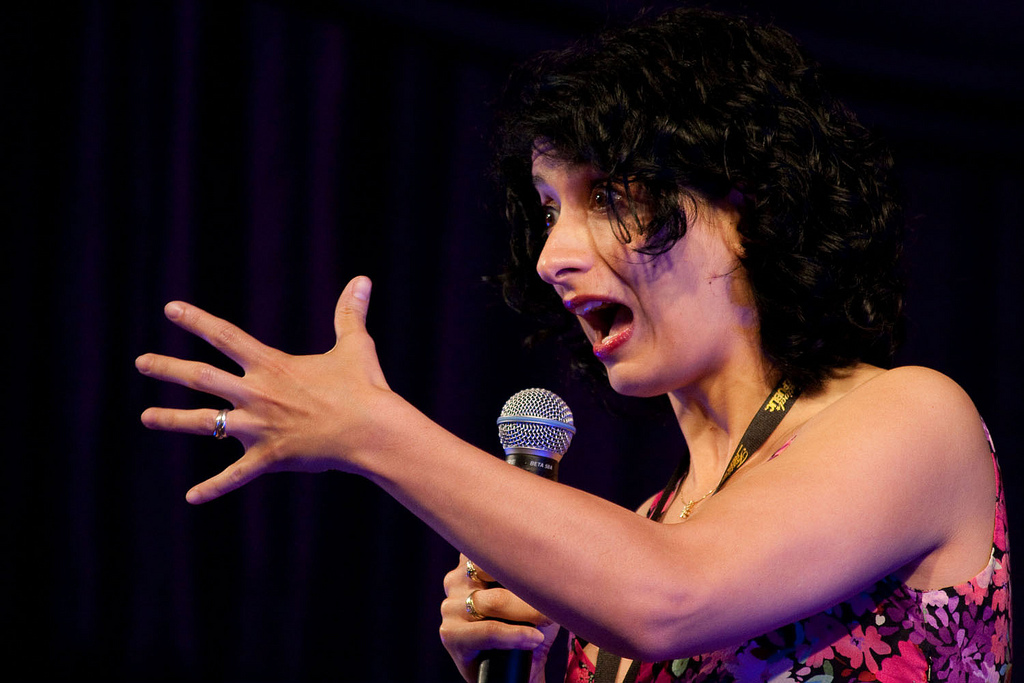
Khorsandi performing at Latitude in 2009

In 2007, Khorsandi travelled to Australia and performed at the Melbourne Comedy Festival. Later, she was nominated for the best breakthrough act at the 2007 Chortle Awards. Khorsandi was one of the acts at The Secret Policeman's Ball 2008 show for Amnesty International; writing in 2021, she reflected that this appearance "led to regular TV bookings, including Live at the Apollo, which meant I could tour. Being a touring comic meant that I made much more money than when I was on the circuit." In December 2008, she appeared on the BBC stand-up television show Live at the Apollo alongside Russell Kane and Al Murray. She performed her show, The Distracted Activist, at the Edinburgh Festival Fringe from 6 to 31 August 2009. The show addressed her involvement in campaigns while being "distracted" by being a single mother. Aston and Harris noted that Khorsandi made a point of emphasising that she was Iranian and a woman, but by highlighting her skin tone and dark hair, she "simultaneously defamiliarises the feminine and makes the foreign familiar: ethnicity and gender intersect to deterritorialise the category 'Woman' as a site of privileged white femininity". They remark that, while her act seeks to expose the concept of the "exotic foreigner" as the construct of "a white imagination", her self-description as "exotic foreigner" as "foreign but not in a way that we hate" potentially reinforces "stranger fetishism". Brian Logan's review in The Guardian found the show lacking in direction, and described it as "conventional comment on geopolitics amid much directionless banter and biographical gossip". Reviewing a performance in Brighton, Sarah Lewis-Hammond wrote in The Argus that she found the show relatable, and that the audience clearly enjoyed it.

Khorsandi was a panellist on Question Time in 2006 and returned in 2010, 2015, and 2018. In a column for The Independent in 2019, she recounted that Boris Johnson inappropriately touched her during one of the shows. She has included references to this in some of her stand-up routines.

Her BBC Radio 4 programme Shappi Talk (2009) had four themed episodes, each with comedy routines relating to her early life in the UK; the themes were racism, unconventional parents, religion, and growing up. The programme included guests like Meera Syal. In The Times, Chris Campling praised Khorsandi as "very funny" and described the show as addressing issues in a way that was "no mere retread of her general stand-up routine". Trevor Lewis of The Sunday Times called it "A comedy treat." Her second series, which explored themes of divorce, addiction, history, and politics, aired in 2010. She performed "Mickey" on the second episode of Let's Dance for Sport Relief 2010, and later was a guest alongside Noddy Holder on Genius, hosted by Dave Gorman. Khorsandi and Holder assessed concepts suggested by the audience, such as emery boards on escalators to file fingernails whilst moving between floors.

Topics in her 2011 show Me and My Brother in Our Pants, Holding Hands included her relationship with her brother, divorce, flashers, and her mother's low self-esteem. Tim Richards of The Age offered a positive review, writing that it was "not wet-your-pants material, but it's an absorbing hour". For the Leicester Mercury reviewer, it was Khorsandi's best show to date, and "a skillfully polished skit, that nevertheless felt like it was being performed for the first time".

Khorsandi wrote a 2011 episode of Little Crackers, a series of short autobiographical programmes shown on Sky1, about meeting Todd Carty from Grange Hill. Lucy Mangan of The Guardian acclaimed it as "a sweet, sharp vision of her grandparents in terrifying few words and minutes. Genius." Her 2012 stand-up show Dirty Looks and Hopscotch was based around an account of a short-term relationship with a famous, un-named, musician. According to James Kettle in The Guardian, Khorsandi presented "perhaps too much information about her sex life, her hang-ups and her general mental health", although he added that the performance had the "merciful addition of an arsenal of great jokes". Victoria Lee of The Daily Telegraph commended Khorsandi in this performance for being "more open than previously" in her routine, which contained "old-fashioned filth".

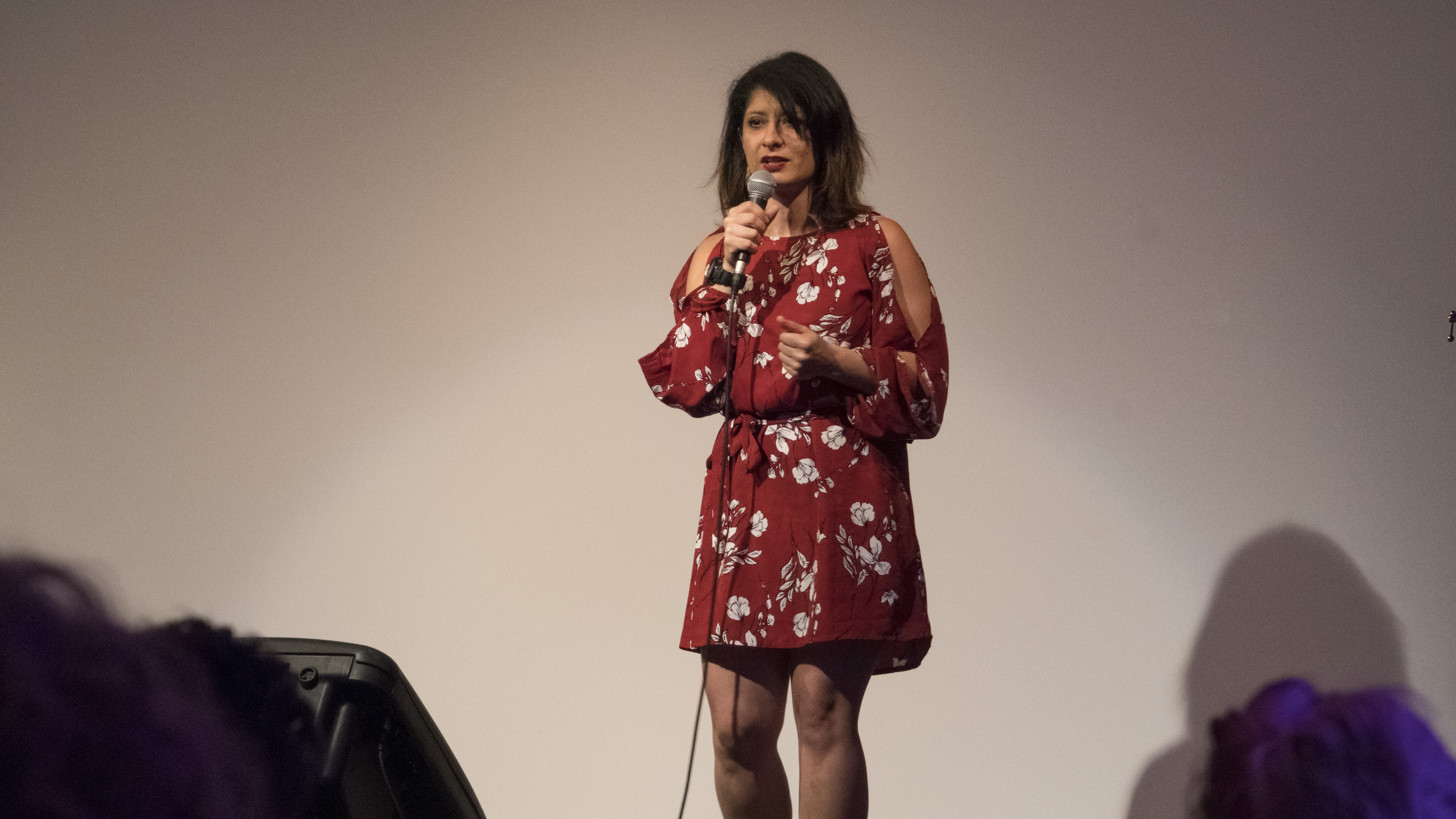
Khorsandi at the Amnesty International Brave Edit Wikimedia UK editathon in 2018

In 2016, Khorsandi appeared with her son on Big Star's Little Star. Also that year, along with other celebrities, she toured the UK to support Jeremy Corbyn's bid to become Prime Minister. Her new stand-up show that year, Oh My Country! From Morris Dancing to Morrissey, was summarised by Jay Richardson of The Scotsman as "a passionate love letter to the England she calls home". The Times critic Dominic Maxwell commented that Khorsandi's "playfully oversharing manner couches a passion for her topic and a knack for getting plenty said in an apparently conversational aside".

Khorsandi was a contestant on the seventeenth series of I'm a Celebrity...Get Me Out of Here! in November 2017 and, following a public vote, was the first contestant to be eliminated. She remarked that she felt isolated during the show and did not enjoy it. Her experience there had helped her realise that she was content with her usual life.

Her show Mistress and Misfit combined material about Khorsandi's life with biographical details about Emma Hamilton. In The Guardian in 2018, Logan wrote that he saw no clear reason for the mixture, and wrote that some of the jokes were reused from Khorsandi's earlier shows. Skittish Warrior... Confessions of a Club Comic saw Khorsandi reflecting on 20 years as a stand-up comedian, including her own undermining of herself in the early years.

It Was the 90s! (2021–2022) examined changes in attitudes since the 1990s, and Khorsandi's own experience of being a ladette. Lloyd Evans, in the Australian edition of The Spectator criticised Khorsandi in 2021, writing that, "Her material is not especially strong and her greatest asset is a combative stage presence which, as she admits, springs from a deep need to show off in front of strangers."

Her other television appearances have included Have I Got News for You, Friday Night with Jonathan Ross,. Mock the Week, 8 Out of 10 Cats, Celebrity Antiques Road Trip, and Blankety Blank.

== Personal life ==
In 2005, she married fellow comedian Christian Reilly, and they had a son together before divorcing in 2011. Her daughter was born in June 2013; the following year she told an interviewer that they were not in contact with the girl's father, "But that's fine, I'm not angry or bitter about it." As of 2022, she is in a relationship with fellow comedian Mark Steel.

Khorsandi was raised without any religion, and identifies as an atheist. She later became a patron of Humanists UK, which appointed her as its president for a three-year term beginning in January 2016, succeeding Jim Al-Khalili. She became a vice-president of the organisation in 2019, a role she retained as of 2023. In 2017, she came out as bisexual, and wrote that she had gone on marches in support of gay rights since she was 17, "Despite all those years of marching and getting drunk at Pride, officially coming 'out' as bisexual seemed like too much of a fuss."

In 2021, Khorsandi announced that she had changed her name back to Shaparak, having been inspired by people like Thandiwe Newton and Bukayo Saka. Writing in The Independent, she said: "I'm only now scratching the surface of how often in my life I have internalised bigotry and tried to bend in a direction which would make my foreignness more comfortable for other people – changing my name was a part of that."

Khorsandi was diagnosed with attention deficit hyperactivity disorder aged 47, which she discussed in a 2023 autobiography.

== Books ==
Khorsandi's memoir, A Beginner's Guide to Acting English, was published by Ebury Press in 2009. The book describes how she experienced England as a young girl. The narrative begins with her attending The Kings' International Nursery School with her brother Peyvand. Throughout the book, she explains how the Persian language differs from English: "They called me 'poppet'. Iranians said 'jaan' or 'azizam'". Other themes include her experiences with English food and customs. Historian Sharif Gemme felt that "While one can hear her distinctive, resonant voice reaching the punchlines at the end of the paragraphs, the final result is not impressive: neither particularly amusing nor genuinely observant."

Her second book and first novel, Nina is Not OK, was published in 2016. The titular character is a teenager living with alcohol abuse. It was nominated for the Jhalak Prize, a literary award for Black, Asian and minority ethnic writers. However, Khorsandi asked for it to be removed from consideration, telling an interviewer, "For once in my career I'd done something not about identity ... and I get a sticker for being brown." Khorsandi's young adult fiction novel Kissing Emma, published in 2021, was inspired by the life of Emma Hamilton. Her autobiographical work Scatter Brain (2023) is subtitled How I finally got off the ADHD rollercoaster and became the owner of a very tidy sock drawer.

== Tours and live shows ==
Shaparak Khorsandi Tours and Live Shows
Year	Title	Notes	Ref.
2000	Pablo Diablo's Cryptic Triptych	Edinburgh Festival Fringe, with Russell Brand and Mark Felgate.	
2001	Off The Kerb Roadshow	Edinburgh Festival Fringe, with Angie McEvoy, JJ Whitehead, and Mark Felgate.	
2003	Shappi Khorsandi	Edinburgh Festival Fringe	
2006	Asylum Speaker	Edinburgh Festival Fringe	
2007	Carry On Shappi	Edinburgh Festival Fringe	
2007	Comedy Gala 2007	Edinburgh Festival Fringe	
2009	The Distracted Activist	Edinburgh Festival Fringe	
2009	Night of Comedy for Ray – Hosted by Michael McIntyre	Edinburgh Festival Fringe	
2010	The Moon on a Stick	Edinburgh Festival Fringe	
2011	Me and My Brother in Our Pants, Holding Hands	Edinburgh Festival Fringe, Melbourne Comedy Festival	
2012–2013	Dirty Looks And Hopscotch	Edinburgh Festival Fringe and tour	
2014	Addison Cresswell Comedy Tribute	Edinburgh Festival Fringe	
2014–2015	Because I'm Shappi	Edinburgh Festival Fringe and tour	
2016–2017	Oh My Country! From Morris Dancing to Morrissey	Edinburgh Festival Fringe and tour	
2017	Mistress & Misfit	Edinburgh Festival Fringe	
2018	Skittish Warrior … Confessions of a Club Comic	Edinburgh Festival Fringe	
2021–2022	It was the 90s!	Touring	

== Publications ==
Books by Shaparak Khorsandi
Year	Title	Publisher	ISBN
2009	A Beginner's Guide To Acting English	Ebury Press	ISBN 978-0-09-192477-5
2016	Nina is Not OK	Ebury Press	ISBN 978-1-78503-136-6
2021	Kissing Emma	Orion (Hachette)	ISBN 978-1-5101-0699-4
2023	Scatter Brain	Vermilion	ISBN 978-1-7850-4419-9

== Awards, honours and nominations ==
Year	Award	Result	Ref.
2000	BBC New Comedy Award	Nominated	
2010	British Comedy Awards, Best Female TV Comic	Nominated	
2010	Honorary doctorate, University of Winchester	Awarded	
2013	James Joyce Award	Won	
2014	BBC's 100 women		

== See also ==
- Iranian stand-up comedy
