= Blood, Sweat & Tools =

- Developed by: Proper Television
- Presented by: Helder Brum; Rob Koci; Hillary Manion
- Country of origin: Canada
- Original language: English
- No. of seasons: 1
- No. of episodes: 9

Production
- Executive producers: Guy O'Sullivan; Jennifer Scott
- Producer: Blair Ricard
- Running time: 60 minutes (including commercials)

Original release
- Network: Discovery Channel Canada
- Release: April 13 – June 8, 2015

Related
- Canada's Worst Handyman

Blood, Sweat & Tools is a Canadian television series that aired on Discovery Channel hosted by Helder Brum, Rob Koci and Hillary Manion, who also acted as the challenge judges and expert advisers to the contestants.

== Format ==
The series is the successor of Canada's Worst Handyman and has a broadly similar format, but with an emphasis on rewarding competent handiwork rather than finding the nation's worst handyman. The couples are divided into teams, who are each tasked with undertaking a number of handiwork-related challenges, with the overall goal of improving their skills and confidence. At the end of each episode, the most improved couple is awarded a prize (unlike Canada's Worst Handyman, no one is named the worst). At the end of the series, a $50,000 cash prize is given to the most improved couple as voted on by the public.

== Contestants ==
- Steve Garner and Richelene Bautista are a young couple from Winnipeg, Manitoba who, by their own admission, are in serious need of an education in handiwork. Steve's projects around the house have almost all ended in failure and Richelene has virtually no knowledge of tools or handiwork whatsoever.
- Jesse Graham and Holly Dusome are a young couple from Penetanguishene, Ontario who are rapidly discovering the limits of their handiwork abilities when trying to adapt their house for their young family. Both have different opinions on what their primary problem is, with Jesse considering Holly a control freak and Holly in turn accusing Jesse of being too sloppy and not planning enough.
- Danielle Routliffe and Tyler Routliffe are a husband and wife from Woodstock, Ontario who met as children, but fail to see eye-to-eye on handiwork. Danielle considers herself to be very capable, but Tyler is worried about her destructive tendencies and habit of abandoning jobs.
- Jake Sharma and Nicole Sharma are a husband and wife from Mission, British Columbia who have a house that is full of incomplete jobs, including exposed wiring and incomplete plumbing. Jake is convinced that he's a good enough handyman to someday start his own business, but Nicole is less convinced.
- Fabian Sprik and Luayn Sprik are a husband and wife who live in a former hotel in Teeterville, Ontario. Fabian dreams of restoring it to its former glory, but so far has accomplished little, much to Luayn's annoyance.

== Synopsis ==
Team	Members	1	2	3	4	5	6	7	8	9
Red Team	Fabian & Luayn	IN	IMP	IN	IN	NOM	NOM	IMP	IN	WINNER
Pink Team	Danielle & Tyler	IN	IN	IMP	IN	NOM	IMP	IN	IN	RUNNER-UP
Blue Team	Jesse & Holly	NOM	IN	IN	NOM	IMP	NOM	NOM	NOM	OUT
Green Team	Jake & Nicole	NOM	NOM	NOM	IMP	IN	NOM	IN	OUT	
Purple Team	Steve & Richelene	IMP	IN	IN	IN	IN	EXPL			

WINNER - The team was named the winner of the series, and awarded the $50,000 prize
RUNNER-UP - The team finished as runners-up
IMP - The team was named the most improved of the episode
NOM - The team was nominated as the most improved of the episode
OUT - The team was eliminated, and is out of the running for the grand prize
EXPL – The team was expelled from the show, and is out of the running for the grand prize

== Episodes ==
=== Episode 1: Let There be Tools! ===
Original airdate: April 13, 2015

- The Workbench: After getting into the prefabricated cabins that will serve as the base for each couple, the teams are each tasked with building a workbench, which should ideally be 36 inches tall, sturdy enough to support having heavy tools permanently attached to it, and most importantly, portable enough that it can easily be carried outside and back into the cabin with a minimum of fuss. The Red Team seemingly manage this challenge well despite a lack of communication between Fabian and Luayn, but then realise that they've made a terrible mistake by building the table far away from their cabin, with no consideration as to whether or not it will fit in. As a result, they have to resort to chopping off a large chunk of the legs, resulting in a very low table and ruining what would otherwise have been a respectable performance. On the Pink Team, Danielle insists on going ahead without measuring or even marking the wood, and Tyler's insistence that she do the job properly results in a stormy build, and a table that's of barely passable quality. The Green Team are the only ones who go to the trouble of measuring the example table built by the experts, but Jake's imprecise measurements and troubles with getting to grips to the tools result in a very haphazard-looking table that noticeably sags in the middle. Much to the experts' alarm, Jake gets Nicole to act as a human brace while he screws the top into the frame. The Purple Team's table proves to be by far the worst, as the inexperience of both Steve and Richelene, along with the former's lackadaisical attitude and the latter's nervousness, results in a table so poor that it totally falls apart when being viewed by the experts. The Blue Team perform easily the best, as despite Jesse's somewhat brusque leadership, their table is completed quickly and to a very solid standard. As a result, their table is judged to be clearly the best and they are named the first challenge winners, and co-forepersons for the next challenge.
- Team Challenge: The Fire Pit and the Swinging Chair: The candidates are split into teams of men and women, with Jesse leading the men, and Holly leading the women. The men are tasked with building a fire pit from bricks, mortar and gravel, while the women have to assemble a flat-packed wooden swinging chair. Construction on the fire pit generally proceeds smoothly thanks to the work of Jake, who had already built a similar fire pit for his home, though he soon finds himself having to do the entire project, with the other men, especially Tyler, taking a backseat. Holly predicts that the chair build will go smoothly because "women follow instructions," but a power struggle soon emerges between her and Danielle, who insists that they don't need the instructions and that they should push on ahead. As a result, Nicole steps in and supervises the project to completion. The following day, the swinging chair is found to be able to hold four people (even though it was only designed for two), while the fire pit easily withstands a lawnmower being driven into it. Though it's noted that both Jesse and Holly did relatively well as leaders, Jake and Nicole are judged to be the standout performers, and so the Green Team are named the second challenge winners, giving them an advantage for the next challenge.
- Toilet Replacement: For the third and final challenge of the episode, the teams each have an hour (except for the Green Team, who have an extra 10 minutes) to remove the toilets from their cabins, and replace them with new ones. As an added challenge, one member of the team must remove the old toilet, and then the other must install the new toilet with no help from their partner. Whoever completes their installation to an acceptable standard (measured by being able to flush a bowl of popcorn) in the shortest amount of time wins. Despite Jake managing to get the old toilet out even before the 10-minute headstart is up, the Green Team rapidly falls apart among infighting between him and Nicole, who even threatens her husband with physical violence. They end up taking a total of 57 minutes to finish the job, with Jake noting that if not for their headstart, they would have been in serious danger of not finishing the job at all. The Pink Team fare little better, with tensions continuing to run high between Danielle and Tyler. They finish a little faster at 55 minutes, but their toilet doesn't flush quite as well as most of the others (though still does it well enough to be considered a pass). Jesse refuses to trust Holly to install their toilet and so ends up doing both halves of the Blue Team's job, in violation of the challenge rules; they complete it in 43 minutes. Things go very smoothly for the Red Team, who complete their job in 36 minutes thanks to Fabian having done this job before. However, they're pipped to the post by the Purple Team, as Steve's unorthodox approach of fully assembling the toilet before installing it pays off, resulting in them finishing in 33 minutes and being named the challenge winners. Because they each won a challenge, the Blue, Green and Purple Teams are nominated as the best of the episode. In the end, the experts note that the Green Team totally imploded in the episode's final challenge, and decide that Jesse's violation of the rules in the same challenge cannot be ignored. This means that the Purple Team are the first to be named the best of the episode, as they got better and better in every challenge, and the experts were extremely impressed with Richelene in particular, for showing by far the most improvement of any of the contestants. She and Steve are rewarded with a Japanese "Smart Toilet" worth $3,000.

=== Episode 2: What's Up, Dock? ===
Original airdate: April 20, 2015

- Window Installation: In the episode's first challenge, each team is required to remove the old single-pane windows from the kitchen area of their cabin, and install a double-glazed replacement. Since the new windows are larger than the ones they are replacing, each team will have to cut larger holes to fit the windows in. The installations will be tested by the experts spraying the window with a fire hose. The Pink Team prove to be by far the worst performers in this challenge, as uncertainty over how they should proceed and arguments between Danielle and Tyler see the project rapidly descend into total chaos. Matters nearly come to a head when Tyler comes dangerously close to slicing through a live electrical cable, and his carelessness and Danielle's screaming reaction causes an argument between the duo and Hillary. They take so long to cut their hole that the challenge ends before they can even attempt to install the window, and Danielle and Tyler are forced to take the full force of the fire hose through the empty hole as punishment for their failure. The Blue, Green and Purple teams all complete the job to a reasonable standard (albeit with Jake and Nicole on the Green Team continuing to argue fiercely during their project), but their windows leak due to inadequate usage of the expanding spray foam. At first sight the Red Team's window seems badly askew, but the experts are shocked to find that the window itself is actually perfectly level; the rest of their hut is in fact what's not level. The window itself holds up perfectly to the fire hose test, and so the team are named the winners of this challenge.
- Team Challenge: The Floating Dock: Fabian and Luayn are placed in charge of an ambitious project to build a floating dock from lumber and foam flotation blocks. Unlike the gender split in the previous week, the teams can be divided up in any way, and Luayn supervises the Blue and Purple teams in cutting the lumber to size, while Fabian has the Green and Pink teams handling preliminary assembly work. During this phase, Hillary notices Steve using the power tools in an unsafe manner, and consequently bars him from using them for the rest of the challenge, entrusting Richelene to do the job instead. Work is initially slow, and further delayed when Fabian notices that the dock's frame has been put together poorly, forcing the teams to take it apart and reassemble it. When the dock is eventually finished (with a diving board added as an extra embellishment), the teams are faced with the difficult task of getting it into the water, a problem which Nicole solves. After some additional work reinforcing the structure, it goes into the lake and successfully floats, and even stands up to all the contestants attempting to capsize it standing on one side of it. For the second week in a row, the standout couples are felt to be the Green Team and the task leaders (the Red Team), the former for being the most valuable contributors, and the latter for successfully organizing a very difficult project. This time however, the decision swings in the direction of the task leaders, and the Red Team win their second successive challenge.
- Outdoor Showers: For this challenge, the teams are each tasked with building a hand pump-powered outdoor shower for their hut within a 90-minute time limit (100 minutes for the Red Team, as a reward for winning the previous challenge), though are thrown a curveball by being given no instructions, only the required materials. Whoever finishes to the required standard first wins. The Blue Team's build soon falls apart due to arguments between Jesse and Holly, eventually causing Jesse to storm off the project. He eventually returns, but not in time to save the project, which they fail to complete in the allotted time. The experts judge the work that they did complete to be actually quite good, but tell them that teamwork is clearly a major issue for them, and one that needs to be resolved if they are to succeed. The Pink Team experiences another troublesome project, which immediately gets off to a difficult start due to Tyler insisting on creating a detailed plan, but Danielle not believing a plan is necessary at all. They end up being unable to get their hand pump working, and so resort to attaching a hose to their kitchen taps. The shower works, but is the last to be finished, barely making the 90 minute time limit. The Red Team squander their head start through a lack of planning, and it takes Fabian and Luayn a long time to get things together and build their shower. The result is arguably the closest to the shower the experts were expecting the teams to build, though is very rickety. Like last week, the Purple Team take an unorthodox approach by assembling their frame upside-down, using tall sheets of corrugated steel for the shower walls rather than the wooden panelling used by most of the other teams, and having their shower spray out upwards to provide a "rain" effect. The result is very solid overall, though the time spent righting the frame prevents them finishing in first place. Victory therefore is claimed by the Green Team, as Jake and Nicole are able to put their differences aside and build their shower relatively quickly; while they stick the pump at the opposite end of the water line to most of the other couples (meaning that their shower needs a second person to pump the water), this is still considered acceptable by the experts. This week, only two teams are in consideration for the most improved, namely the Green and Red Teams. While Hillary argues that the Green Team should be named the best for working better together than they had done in the past, and also argues that the Red Team's rickety shower should preclude them from being named the best, Rob and Helder ultimately agree on naming the Red Team as the best, for winning two challenges and doing generally very solid work across the episode. Fabian and Luayn are awarded with a $1,000 diving board, though are befuddled as to what they'd actually use it for.

=== Episode 3: The Walls Come Tumbling Down ===
Original airdate: April 27, 2015

- Bunk Beds: Each team must convert the two bedrooms of their cabins into a single, larger bedroom with a bunk bed. To do this, the teams must knock out the dividing walls, and then assemble the beds from scratch. In keeping with their tradition of unorthodox approaches to projects, the Purple Team build their beds outside of the cabin, with the bottom bunk being free-standing, and the top bunk held in place by a chain hung from the ceiling. Unfortunately, the two mis-measure and find that their beds don't fit in the way they originally intended, forcing them to be placed at right-angles. This, along with the fact that Steve resorted to just smashing the dividing wall with his boots rather than using the reciprocating saw (as everyone else did), cements their performance in this challenge as the worst. In what is rapidly becoming a familiar pattern, the Pink Team is slowed down drastically in the early stages due to Danielle and Tyler's bickering over what approach to take to the project. Despite their continued arguments they do finish the bed in time, but are criticized for the very small gap between the two bunks. Conversely, the Red Team has a very harmonious build, but their bunks turn out to be too far apart, 15 inches over the recommended distance. The Blue Team manages to build what in most aspects is the best bed, with railings and a ladder, but miss out on top spot due to forgetting to add a brace to the top bunk, along with the horrible working atmosphere between Jesse and Holly. Therefore, the Green Team, who managed to work together well after some initial arguments between Jake and Nicole, and also ended up making an overall very solid bed, are named the winners of this challenge.
- Team Challenge: The Gazebo: Jake and Nicole are given the job of leading the contestants through the task of building a prefabricated gazebo, along with making a picnic table from scratch, and building a barbecue out of an old oil drum. Jake assigns Fabian and Jesse to build the picnic table which, despite getting very little direction from Jake, they complete without any trouble. The barbecue is mostly handled by Steve, who also manages to finish it without any trouble, though considers Jake's leadership to be more than a little nitpicky. Nicole leads the remaining contestants in assembling the gazebo, and quickly gets very flustered and snappy, causing the build to progress slowly. Things speed up once the remaining contestants join them, despite Nicole continuing to maintain a negative attitude. However, after having already witnessed several safety violations (including Jesse and Fabian both needing to be reminded to wear eye protection, and Jake's unsafe use of the angle grinder), Rob drags everyone aside to reprimand them for failing to wear the safety gloves that they were specifically instructed to use. He warns them of dire consequences should he see any more safety violations, but minutes later Fabian is caught without his gloves on a critical part of the build. An infuriated Rob immediately shuts the build down and declares the project a failure; consequently, no team is named the best for this task, and no-one gets an advantage for the next challenge.
- Boat Lifts: The third and final challenge for this episode gives each team 90 minutes to assemble a boat lift from a combination of a kit, and lumber that each team must cut to size. Whoever completes their boat lift in the fastest time to an acceptable standard will win. For the second episode in a row, the Blue Team fails to finish a challenge due to Jesse and Holly's inability to work together, and unlike the previous week, the experts tell them that their boat lift would likely not have been deemed acceptable even if it were finished due to the generally poor workmanship. The Green Team actually manage to finish in the second-fastest time after yet another row between Jake and Nicole (which causes the latter to briefly storm out), but their lift is not considered up to scratch by the experts, due to it being far too small (to the extent where it can only barely hold a child's canoe) and having various other faults. The Red Team are the slowest of the teams who actually complete the job, due to confusion over the tools needed; their boat lift turns out to be of generally passable quality, though is a little wider than it needs to be. The Purple Team decide to save time by building their lift from offcuts from the Pink Team's lumber, and the experts have no major criticisms of their work. However, they're beaten to first place by the Pink Team themselves, as Danielle and Tyler finally manage to work together harmoniously, agree on a definite plan for the job, and finish it quickly.

Before naming the most improved team, the experts drop a bombshell; prior to the final episode, two teams will be eliminated. They do not tell the teams how or when this will occur, but hint that as of now, they consider the Blue Team to be the worst of the five due to leaving jobs unfinished and having shown no improvement in their ability to work together. The Red Team are also privately concerned that any repeat of their careless safety violations could result in them being thrown off the show if they commit a bad enough mistake.

Again, there are two teams in consideration for best, namely the Green and Pink Teams. Hilary argues that the Green Team should be named the best, as they've been consistently strong until now, and are making major progress toward working together better, despite the occasional argument. Helder, on the other hand, feels that the Pink Team deserve to be named the best as a reward for turning their act around this episode, after their generally dreadful performances in the first two episodes. In the end, Rob sides with Helder, and the Green Team are passed over for the third time in a row, with the Pink Team being named the best. Their reward is an outdoor Sicilian pizza oven, and while Danielle admits that she has no idea how to make pizza, she says that she's going to learn it now.

=== Episode 4: Thrown for a Coop ===
Original airdate: May 4, 2015

- Roof Repairs: A large hole has been made in each cabin and the teams must repair these holes by cutting the hole into a larger, square gap, cutting plywood to fit the gap, and then covering the plywood with a waterproof membrane and shingles. One member of the team will go atop the roof of the cabin and handle the bulk of the work, while the other will mostly handle prep work and anything that needs to be done inside the cabin. The tensions that have been building between Jake and Nicole on the Green Team continue to be a major problem, and when combined with Nicole's fear of heights and near-total lack of knowledge on how to use a power saw (with all three experts having to instruct her during the course of the challenge), they fail to get past cutting their initial gap. The Purple Team does a generally creditable job despite Richelene having some minor problems cutting the plywood, but are sharply criticised for wasting materials; in particular, their cabin had a thicker roof than the others, which they even out by adding several layers of shingles, instead of just shimming out the difference with the plywood. The Pink Team also does well, with Danielle conquering her fear of working in high places, though they are found to have a few loose tiles; an easy problem to fix, but one that precludes them from winning. The actual best job is done by the Red Team, with Fabian's repair job being virtually seamless; because he refused to let Luayn do any of the work however, they are not rewarded with top spot for the challenge. That honour goes to the Blue Team, who rebound from the heavy criticisms they got in the previous episode, work together harmoniously and finish the job near-flawlessly.
- Team Challenge: The Teeter-Totter: Because Jesse, Jake, Danielle, Steve and Fabian are considered the nominal leaders of their respective teams, they are told to stand aside and let each of their partners work together in constructing a child's teeter-totter from supplied materials. Despite the Blue Team winning the previous challenge, Holly is not placed in charge of the build, and the five instead come to a consensus on how they should build it. Richelene and Tyler take the lead on cutting the materials to size, while Holly, Luayn and Nicole handle the assembly work. The build subsequently goes with no major problems at all, the only real issue being some brief confusion over the instructions, which Tyler helps to clear up, and the teeter-totter is finished on time and to a high standard. The lead team members are suitably impressed, until the experts drop a bombshell; they have to work together to build the same teeter-totter their partners just built, without any instructions. They end up having to use the scrap lumber left over from the first teeter-totter to get an idea on the dimensions, with Steve handling the seats, and the remaining four cutting the lumber. Despite having been asleep for most of the initial build, Steve takes point on assembling their teeter-totter, remembering the details and dimensions of the first one. Though the team builds a very close copy of it, their finished product has a fatal flaw in that they built the base far too narrow, resulting in it being so unstable that it can barely even stand up unsupported, and leading to the partner team being named the clear winners. Due to the challenge being designed primarily to help the partners, and the two best performers being from different original teams (Tyler in the first part, and Steve in the second), no individual team is named the winner.
- Chicken Coops: The episode's third and final challenge requires each team to build a chicken coop. The teams are required to provide at least 4 square feet per bird, and make it both escape-proof and predator-proof, but otherwise are free to design it however they want. The Blue Team get a 10-minute headstart for winning the first challenge, and the remaining teams each have 90 minutes. Due to the scope of this challenge, the teams are each given the full amount of time rather than the usual criteria of whoever finishes first winning. Most of the teams get far too ambitious, trying to build huge coops including a separate house and yard. As a result, the Blue, Pink and Purple teams all fail to get anywhere near completing their coops. The Pink Team performs the worst, as Danielle and Tyler descend into arguing, and get almost nothing accomplished, while the Blue Team fares little better due to Holly losing her confidence and letting Jesse make all the key decisions. The Purple Team, despite a late push, fail to recover from a slow start and still have a lot unfinished. The Red Team come close to finishing, but their overly ambitious attempt to build the largest coop and an argument late on between Fabian and Luayn sees them narrowly fail. Therefore, the Green Team, who were the only ones to fully understand the challenge and build a modest home for the chickens, along with managing to keep the arguments between Jake and Nicole under control (using a "safe word" technique they learned from the Pink Team), are by far and away the best performers in this challenge, and easily named the winners. The Blue and Green Teams are in contention for the episode's best and the experts quickly come to a unanimous decision. While the Blue Team certainly improved their teamwork a lot in the first challenge, they slipped back into their old ways in the third challenge and the experts agree that ultimately, how the teams finish an episode is more important than how they start it. Therefore, it's fourth time lucky for the Green Team, whose impeccable work on the chicken coop sees them finally named the most improved couple of the week after three near-misses. For their victory, Jake and Nicole are awarded a high-end set of carving knives and roasting pans, along with a supply of whole, frozen chickens.

=== Episode 5: Lights! Paneling! Action! ===
Original airdate: May 12, 2015

- Wall insulation: For this episode's first challenge, the teams must tear down one of the walls in their cabins, place fibreglass insulation in the gaps (cutting and installing extra wall studs if needed), place a vapour barrier over the insulation and then add in new wall panelling. Despite the teams being explicitly told that they are to install their insulation in a wall that has two windows, Jake ignores this instruction and decides to install it in the corner of the kitchen, even as Nicole (and later Rob when he drops by to see how they're doing) tries to remind him of the instructions. On top of that, the two fail to install the needed extra studs, and affix their wall panelling so poorly that a small tug from Hillary brings it all falling down, cementing the Green Team as the worst in this challenge. The Purple Team do an okay job of attaching their wall panelling and vapour barrier, but resort to haphazardly stuffing chunks of insulation in the wall instead of cutting it to size, which the experts tell them is a waste of materials and will not insulate effectively. The Blue and Red Teams both get their insulation and vapour barriers installed correctly, but their wall panelling is visibly loose in places; the Red Team also have issues with Fabian and Luayn working together. The Pink Team, therefore, are named the winners, as while their job wasn't perfect by any means (in particular, they left large, obvious joins between their sheets of wall panelling), it was still the best of the five teams.
- Outdoor Floodlights: Instead of the usual team challenge, this episode has the five lead members of each team (and Tyler, as a reward for the Pink Team's victory in the previous challenge) attend a lesson on how to install an outdoor security floodlight, controlled by a switch inside the cabin. They will then be tasked with instructing their partners on how to install the floodlight on their cabins, with the caveat that the lead members cannot take any hands-on role, and will be ejected from the cabin if they set hands on the job even once (something that would ultimately happen to every team leader except for Fabian). The Green Team again performs the worst, as Jake bizarrely insists that Nicole install the switch in the middle of the cabin rather than by the door, something that she eventually corrects, but costs them valuable time. Additionally, Nicole fails to properly mount the light due to losing some of the necessary screws, and does such a poor wiring job that not only do two switches have to be turned on to switch on the light when only one should be necessary, the circuit isn't even grounded, resulting in the experts declaring the job unsafe and refusing to test it. The Purple Team has a stormy build, with Richelene twice trying to give up due to the stress caused by the installation. She, too, fails to properly ground her circuit, and her job is also not tested by the experts. Despite Fabian not actually being ejected, he proves very controlling and argues a lot with Luayn. While the Red Team's light is installed mostly correctly, Luayn fails to correctly recess the mounting box, which will require additional work to make it waterproof. Tyler does a generally very solid job with the Pink Team's light, but like Luayn, initially fails to realise that the box should be recessed. Tyler does try to correct the issue, but runs out of time and only succeeds in recessing it about halfway. The Blue Team are therefore the winners, as Jesse's clear instructions (despite getting thrown out of the cabin) and Holly's intelligent approach to the job leads to the job being completed to a near-perfect standard.
- Kitchen Cabinets: Each team has to install a set of prefabricated cabinets in their cabin's kitchens, a task which will require one of the walls to be knocked out in order to expand the kitchen. Though the teams are permitted some autonomy in this job, they are informed that their kitchens must be based around a "triangle" layout made up of the sink, the fridge and the dishwasher, and that any kitchen which does not conform to this layout will be judged a failure. The teams each have three hours, with the Blue Team getting an extra ten minutes thanks to their challenge victory. All of the teams have major problems figuring out how to make the triangle layout work due to the very limited space available in the kitchens. In the end, the Green, Pink and Purple Teams all fail to complete the job, with the Green and Pink Teams being brought down by teamwork issues (the Green Team also discovering that the fridge they were supplied with will not even fit through the doors to their kitchen), and the Purple Team failing to realise that their cupboards are supposed to have drawers incorporated into them until Hillary specifically informs them of this, which happens too late for them to regroup and finish. The Blue Team finish their kitchen on-time and to a generally decent standard, but the experts find several careless mistakes, including at least one cupboard having its handle mounted on the same side as the hinges. The Red Team finish their kitchen with no major faults noted and so are named the winners of this challenge. Though the Blue, Pink and Red Teams are shortlisted for the title of the episode's most improved, the Pink Team are immediately removed from consideration due to their failure to complete the third challenge, whereas the Blue and Red Teams completed all three. Though Rob favours the Red Team for doing well in all the challenges and completing the most complex challenge (the kitchen) flawlessly, Helder and Hillary agree that Fabian still needs to work on his leadership style, and that Jesse and Holly have done a good job of addressing their previously very poor teamwork. The Blue Team are named the most improved, something which the experts admitted that three episodes ago they didn't see ever happening, and Jesse and Holly are awarded a high-end kitchen sink and garbage disposer, which Jesse immediately resolves to install when the two get home.

=== Episode 6: That Sinking Feeling ===
Original airdate: May 18, 2015

- The Kitchen Sink: The experts jokingly tell the teams that because they've installed "everything but the kitchen sink" so far on the show, an actual kitchen sink will be the next thing that they install. Rob gives the teams a lengthy lesson beforehand, emphasizing that the sinks must be installed to code, especially the trap, before giving them two hours to get the job done. Despite seemingly getting through the job without a hitch, the Blue Team's sink fails to work due to the water pipe getting kinked in the installation, causing them to finish in last place by default, much to Jesse's anger. The Pink Team are heavily criticised for failing to use the supplied template for their sink, along with their extremely messy and ugly plumbing; Rob berates them for the latter, accusing them of laziness and telling them that they will be eliminated before the final if they maintain this approach. Similarly, the Green Team are taken to task for their extremely loose sink (a consequence of not using the template) and leaving a large, obvious hole in the side of the cabinet, where Jake cut an incorrectly located hole for their water line. The Red Team seemingly get through the job without any major trouble, but make two big mistakes, not only discarding the template (and resultantly cutting another hole that's too big, albeit not as much as the Green Team's) but attaching the hot and cold lines to the wrong taps. While the Purple Team have the huge additional job of having to run water from the other side of their hut to the new kitchen, which ultimately proves too much and keeps them from finishing the whole job, the experts are nonetheless hugely complimentary of the work that they did do, saying that they cannot find a single fault. As a result, the Purple Team are named the winners of this challenge.
- Walkways and Flagpoles: The teams are each tasked with laying a concrete walkway to their cabins, along with erecting a flagpole. The flagpole's hole will have to be dug out using a mechanical auger, to a depth of 23 inches. Helder gives the teams a lesson, and emphasizes the importance of safety. The twist is that the teams each only get the first 10 minutes working together and then have to alternate "tag team" style, which means that the holes must be dug in the first 10 minutes due to the requirement for two people to operate the auger. Immediately after the first team switch is called out, Steve commits a serious violation of the safety regulations by attempting to operate the auger himself after failing to reach the required 23-inch depth in the initial 10 minutes. Helder is enraged by this, and even more by the fact that not only does he have to yell at Steve four times before he shuts the auger off, Steve then gets in Helder's face and shouts about the challenge being unfair. Steve continues to argue the point, eventually resulting in Richelene having to step in and talk him down; Steve then angrily throws the auger aside, and "accidentally" breaks the team's shovel when attempting to continue digging the hole, before demanding to use the auger again, and then angrily throwing his building supplies around the cabin. Realising that Steve's behaviour has disrupted the challenge too badly for it to continue (in particular, the Pink and Blue Teams, located next to the Purple Team, both stopped working and were left visibly shaken), the experts call a halt to the challenge. No one is declared the winner. After the challenge ends, the experts summon all the teams and announce that while they were originally going to eliminate the weakest team at the end of this episode, Steve's actions have changed all that. The experts berate Steve, telling him that his actions were wholly unacceptable, likening him to a "hooligan," before bluntly telling the Purple Team that they are expelled with immediate effect and to leave the site at once. As the Purple Team are driven away, Richelene is visibly distraught, while Steve's only comment is that his outburst was how he typically resolves his temper issues and that he would not have physically struck Helder.
- Wall-mounted Shelves: While the remaining four teams are still in shock from Steve's abrupt meltdown, the experts tell them immediately after eliminating the Purple Team that they will be proceeding onto the next challenge regardless. This requires them to build a set of shelves from supplied lumber, based on a model that Hillary shows them; furthermore, she informs them that the shelves must be precisely 2.5x the size of the model. She also gives the teams a lesson in using routers, which must be used to cut dadoes to fit the wood together. The teams each have 90 minutes in which to make their shelves (the Purple Team would have gotten a headstart, but due to their elimination every team gets the same amount of time). Calculating the required size trips up most of the teams, with Fabian mistakenly thinking it's supposed to be 3x the model size, Tyler incorrectly working out the required width as 29" instead of 32.5" (though he corrects it before he and Danielle begin cutting the wood), and Jake insisting over Nicole's objections that they don't need to replicate the expert's model in exact detail. The Green Team's shelves end up bearing next to no resemblance to what they were asked to build, but are nonetheless quite well-made, and Jake and Nicole were noted to have worked together better than usual. The Red Team, despite finishing well in advance of any of the other teams and having very solid workmanship, is ultimately undermined by Fabian's measuring errors. While the Blue Team's shelves are a little too far away from the reference model for the experts' liking, their overall build quality is judged to be the best in the challenge. The Pink Team overcome a very stormy build and frequent arguments between Danielle and Tyler to build shelves that are a near-perfect match for what the experts requested. Due to the Purple Team's ejection and no winner being declared in the walkway and flagpole challenge, the best couple ultimately comes down solely to the shelving challenge, with all four teams being nominated for the best. The experts ultimately decide that while workmanship is important, the ability to follow instructions correctly is even more vital (especially given that the argument that ultimately saw the Purple Team expelled started out over Steve's refusal to follow the instructions) and thus the Pink Team become the first to be named the best for a second time, something that visibly disgruntles the other teams. The Pink Team's reward is a pair of Canadian flags; a small, tabletop flag for Tyler and a gigantic flag (big enough to cover up the site's central stage) for Danielle.

=== Episode 7: Door-to-Door Service ===
Original airdate: May 26, 2015

- Front Doors: Since each of the teams was forced to destroy the front door of their cabins in order to gain access on the first day, they are each asked to replace not only the door, but its frame as well. While the team will be supplied with a pre-made door, they will be required to build the frame from scratch, as well as fitting hinges to the door and frame. The Blue Team mismeasure and build their frame too large, as do the Pink Team. While the Pink Team resort to just jamming shims in to even out the difference (something that the expert sharply criticize them for), the Blue Team end up remaking their entire frame, which takes up so much time that they fail to come anywhere close to finishing. Nonetheless, the experts compliment the Blue Team for the high quality of the work that they did finish, and note that Jesse and Holly have developed what appears to be the strongest team dynamic. The Green Team get the job finished, but the door is a little tight, and more significantly they did not build a new frame and re-used the existing one. While the experts are critical of this, and even more so of the fact that it took them 75 minutes before getting anything accomplished on the job, they nonetheless accept Jake's reasoning that the door frame was supporting the roof, and would have been too dangerous to remove outright. The Red Team, who felt that they had a point to prove in this challenge, successfully replace their door (a more difficult task than faced by most of the other teams, due to their unlevel cabin), almost perfectly, the only major issue being messy usage of expanding spray foam. This results in Fabian and Luayn easily being named the challenge winners.
- Cabin Signs: The teams are each given a large log, which they are asked to cut at least one cross-section out of and then use to build a sign. The Red Team are given use of a chainsaw as a reward for their victory in the previous challenge, while the remaining teams have to make do with two-person crosscut saws. The Pink Team are slowed down severely when Tyler has major difficulty cutting a maple leaf from the cross-section, with Helder commenting that the result looks more like a fan than a maple leaf. This results in them being the only one of the four teams who fail to finish, and adding insult to injury, the experts point out that they misspelled their team motto on the sign. The Green Team also get slowed down, in their case through trouble using the crosscut saws; they do finish however, and the experts compliment them on their clearly heartfelt design, though have issues with the quality of workmanship. The Red Team make full use of their chainsaw and finish well ahead of the other teams, but their sign, while otherwise well-made, receives some criticism for its unambitious design. The Blue Team are therefore victorious, as Holly's creative design (which showcases nearly all the skills that the teams have learned until now) and her strong working dynamic with Jesse results in what the experts judge the best sign.
- Range Hoods: In a departure from the usual procedure, the experts first reveal that the Blue Team's advantage is being able to make one of the other teams start the challenge fifteen minutes later than the rest and they immediately choose the Red Team, who they regard as their biggest threat. The Blue, Green and Pink Teams are then sent to their cabins, where they discover that the task involves installing a range hood, which entails attaching it to wall studs, connecting it to the electrical supply and then creating a hole for the hood's exhaust. The teams have 90 minutes (except for the Red Team, who have 75). Believing that they can beat the Red Team regardless, Holly deliberately nullifies the Red Team's disadvantage by openly telling them what the task is. Hillary tells Holly that while this is technically not a violation of the challenge rules, she just threw away their advantage and Jesse is also less than thrilled to learn what Holly did. Shockingly, three of the four teams end up failing the job. The Green Team fails to finish at all, due to problems with their kitchen layout and continuing arguments between Jake and Nicole. While the Blue Team end up being the first to finish, the modifications they made to the hood render the fan unable to spin, which ends up destroying the motor. The Pink Team's hood also fails to work, due to Tyler inadvertently damaging the electrical connections during the installation, and not being able to repair them in time. Despite the Red Team's initial disadvantage and being further slowed down when Luayn accidentally sustains a deep cut to her hand, the team rally and finish the job flawlessly and so are the obvious winners. With the Red Team having won the first and third challenges and the Blue Team winning the second, the two teams are nominated for best of the episode. Despite Holly's actions in the previous challenge, Hillary feels that they were the best of the four teams for their consistently strong teamwork and showing more ambition than the other teams. However, Rob and Helder feel that the Red Team are the overwhelmingly obvious choice to be named the best, as they did very well in all the challenges, have overcome their previous teamwork problems and were the only team to win two challenges this week. Their reward is a $2,400 gasoline-powered chainsaw with a 60-inch blade, something which both Fabian and Luayn are thrilled to receive.

=== Episode 8: Chip Off the Old Cabin ===
Original airdate: June 1, 2015

- The Bar: After reminding the contestants that the weakest team will be eliminated this episode, the experts reveal that whoever wins this challenge will be immune from elimination this week and guaranteed entry to the finale. The challenge entails building a bar with a curved copper top, a built-in cooler and storage space for a good selection of drinks. The Green Team's build proves highly problematic, due to Jake initially refusing to discuss his proposed design (which doesn't even have an entry point for the bartender) and then frequent clashes between him and Nicole when he does let her get involved. Though they manage to finish the project after a late rush, it proves to be the least impressive of the four bars by some distance. The Red Team gets slowed down initially due to the complex carpentry they opt to use; this does result in them having the best shelves, but leaves them short on time to install the cooler, which Luayn achieves by crudely slicing out part of the worktop and hammering the cooler in, bringing down an otherwise very solid performance. For once, the Pink Team has easily the most harmonious build, as Tyler's clear plan and simple-but-solid design lead to them finishing with minimal fuss. Their only shortcoming is forgetting to factor the cooler into their design. Despite initial problems caused by Holly's ambitious plan to slice a boat in half and build their bar from it, the Blue Team soon pull together and finish their bar to a near-perfect standard. The experts note this to be the closest decision yet, with the Blue, Pink and Red Teams all doing very solid work, but ultimately the Blue Team wins out due to their greater ambition and generally good workmanship, to the frustration of the Pink and especially Red Teams, making the Blue Team the first to enter the finale.
- Water Heaters: Rob gives the teams a lesson in installing a water heater, connecting it to the water lines, and installing a GFCI outlet to power the heater. The Blue Team is given the option of sitting this challenge out since they are guaranteed to be in the final no matter what, but they decide that the opportunity to attempt the job in this setting is one they shouldn't pass up. The teams each have two hours to complete the job, and must use the spot marked by the experts. The Blue Team quickly become overconfident due to their immunity, and Jesse's carelessness when using the blowtorch results in him causing a small fire, forcing the crew to step in and extinguish it. Their build is immediately shut down, with the experts telling Jesse and Holly that had they not been immune, they would have faced some form of punishment. As for the teams actually competing in the challenge, the Pink Team have easily the most harmonious build, despite Danielle's confusion over the water connections. They finish on-time and the water heater itself works fine, but their shut-off valve turns out to leak. The experts note that it should be a simple fix, but Danielle and Tyler are worried that this small mistake could cost them. Fabian on the Red Team comes dangerously close to causing a fire himself, after getting frustrated while trying to solder the pipes together; nonetheless, their heater works perfectly, with no leaks or any other problems. After a build that is a little less stormy than usual (though Nicole's recommendation that they use the bar top for soldering results in them making a huge mess of solder and flux), the Green Team's heater fails to power on. When Helder inspects the GFCI outlet it turns out that Nicole accidentally connected the electrical wires to the outlet's ground terminals. Both she and Jake are devastated by this, realizing that unless one of the other teams messed up even worse, this mistake has likely cost them their place in the competition. Despite the implication that the elimination decision would be based solely on the previous challenge, the experts ultimately decide to base it on the entire history of the three teams so far. While the Red Team is noted to be clearly the most talented of the three and Luayn receives much praise for a huge improvement, all three experts are still worried about Fabian, feeling that he's shown little (if any) improvement since the start of the season. The Pink Team are complimented for the overall progress they've made after their awful early performances, though Rob still feels that they're a little on the inconsistent side. As for the Green Team, the experts feel that Jake and Nicole are talented individually, but have serious problems when it comes to working together. When the teams gather for the announcement, the Pink Team are, much to their surprise, named as the second team to join the finale, for showing the most improvement overall. This leaves the Green and Red Teams and in the end, the experts note that one of the teams was consistently solid throughout the season, while the other, despite arguably showing more improvement overall, tended to totally disintegrate whenever things got tough. The Green Team are therefore eliminated, though, unlike the Purple Team, are at least allowed to say goodbye to the experts and other teams and leave the show in overall high spirits, feeling that the experience was still worthwhile. The Red Team are left to join the Blue and Pink Teams in the finale.
- The Dream Project: After the Green Team's elimination, the experts reveal that the three remaining teams each have a project that they (unknowingly) told the experts they wanted to do. No winner will be declared for this challenge, as the aim is to simply impress the voting public. For the Blue Team, this project is installing an electric fireplace and a feature wall for their bar, the Red Team's project is redoing their cabin's exterior walls and fitting a ceiling fan in the kitchen, and the Pink Team's is the window that they failed to install back in the second episode. All of these jobs go well, and Jesse, Danielle and Fabian each admit to underestimating the skills of their respective partners, and that they've learned to properly work as a team in the process. In fact, the teams each finish their jobs well ahead of schedule, and so make extra jobs for themselves; the Blue Team chops up the rest of the boat that they built their bar from in order to make even more decorations, the Pink Team affixes panelling to their cabin wall and the Red Team properly recesses the security light that they didn't quite finish several episodes ago. After finishing their dream projects (there is no review by the experts), each of the teams makes their case to the viewers at home as to why they deserve $50,000.

=== Episode 9: And the Winner Is... ===
Original airdate: June 8, 2015

In this live finale episode (the length of time that has passed since the prior eight episodes is indicated by the fact that Danielle is now heavily pregnant and Luayn's formerly blonde hair is now dark brown), the three finalist teams reunite in front of a live studio audience. Voting remains open for most of the episode, and the winner will be announced at the end. The teams will still face a series of challenges in a last-gasp bid to earn the nation's votes.

- Water Pipes: The first live challenge requires the three teams to each connect pipes to a laundry sink that has been placed atop a large wooden frame, and then use the tank's contents to fill a beaker to the required level, with the first team to do so winning. The Blue Team finish in last place by a large margin, after drilling their holes too small and out of alignment and not being able to regroup in time. The challenge proves a close-run race between the Pink and Red Teams, but after a slow start the Red Team are ultimately triumphant. Between challenges, highlight reels for all three teams are shown. The Red Team name their proudest moment as the range hood challenge in episode 7, where they won despite a 15-minute time penalty and Luayn injuring her hand. The Blue Team are proud of how well they regrouped after their disastrous performance in episode 3's boat lift challenge. Similarly, the Pink Team name their failure in the window challenge in episode 2 (and the ensuing spraying they took with a fire hose) as their own turning point. A "top 3 stumbles" reel is then shown, with #3 being Jake falling into the lake while placing the Green Team's boat lift, #2 being Jesse accidentally breaking his plastic chair while watching the teeter-totter challenge and #1 going to Jake again, this time for tripping up while removing the team's old toilet from the cabin, resulting in him breaking the toilet and then tripping up on a cardboard box outside the cabin.
- The Pop Quiz: The three teams each take part in a quiz loosely styled after Jeopardy! answering handiwork-related questions with values of 10, 20, 30 or 40 points. The Pink Team finish third with 70 points after a poor performance in the first round, with the Blue and Red Teams tying on 130 points. The challenge goes to sudden death and the Red Team correctly answer the question to win their second consecutive challenge. After the quiz finishes, a brief reel showing the "top 3 jobs done without tools" moments is shown—all of which go to Steve, for his habit of carrying out demolition jobs by just tearing or kicking away bits of the cabin that need to be removed.
- Home Challenge: Chairs The final challenge of the season is one that the contestants have to do at home with their own tools, and lumber supplied by the show. This challenge entails building a chair that can support at least 250 pounds. The Blue Team are the only ones who actually measure an existing chair, while the Pink and Red Teams make rough guesses by measuring Danielle and Luayn's approximate sitting positions. The Red and Pink Teams end up producing near-identical-looking chairs (albeit with the latter being a bit taller and narrower), while the Blue Team choose a more unorthodox plywood-based design and also produce a footrest. The experts allow the studio audience to vote for the winning chair and the Red Team's chair is overwhelmingly named the best, giving the team a clean sweep of all the episode's challenges. Before the result is announced, a few more highlight reels are shown, including of the Green and Purple Teams. The experts then give their thoughts on the three remaining teams, complimenting Luayn on the huge improvement in her skillset, Jesse and Holly on their creativity and ability to work together, Danielle for being able to set her ego aside and learn with new skills, and Tyler for gaining in confidence. Finally, the results are announced. The Blue Team finish in third place, visibly disheartening Holly and especially Jesse, though they are nonetheless complimented for the overall strong job they did. The winner of the public vote is then announced as the Red Team, who take home the $50,000 grand prize.

== See also ==
- Canada's Handyman Challenge
- Junk Raiders
