= Canada's Worst Handyman 6 =

- Season 6
- Starring: Andrew Younghusband
- No. of episodes: 7

Release
- Original network: Discovery Channel Canada
- Original release: May 2 – June 13, 2011

Season chronology
- ← Previous; Canada's Worst Handyman 5 Next → Last

Canada's Worst Handyman 6 was the sixth and final season of Canada's Worst Handyman, a Canadian reality television series on Discovery Channel which seeks to improve the do-it-yourselfer skills of five contestants. In this season, the contestants must transform several rooms in the Niagara Falls Carriage House on Lundy's Lane in Niagara Falls, Ontario and transform the space into a retreat for newlyweds. Group challenges this year will be focused on transforming a common area into a spa. As with its sister season Canada's Worst Driver 6, a new series logo was commissioned for this season, dubbed "the honeymoon suite season" for all but the first episode.

== Experts ==
- Gail Prosser-Craig is an expert carpenter, operating a renovation company entirely staffed by women.
- Geoff Woodmansey is a general contractor who has a lot of experience in transforming rundown places: the on-screen host of Discovery Channel's Junk Raiders chronicles one of his most notable recent endeavors.

== Contestants ==
- Charlene Hunt, from Pickering, Ontario, is a designer who considers herself an "idea gal," but when it comes to actual work, her husband, Dave, is usually the one to step in and fix her errors, to the point he has to go to work to relax. Accompanying Charlene (the only female nominee) to rehab will be her twin sister Charmaine.
- Daniel "Dan" Lafleur, from Cambridge, Ontario, is a new homeowner whose home is under constant renovation due to projects never being completed. This sends calm and cool Dan into a frenzy, forcing his wife and nominator, Natasha, out of the home for him to rage in peace.
- Robert "Rob" McFarlane, from Dunchurch, Ontario, is a professional construction worker, with his trade being installing insulation. He believes that handiwork is a painful job and that anyone who is handy should bear the pain. However, Rob's common-law wife and nominator, Joe-Anne McMillan, is more concerned about his health than the quality of their work.
- Ajay Pal Singh, from Strathmore, Alberta (near Calgary), is a landlord and businessman who believes professionals are too expensive. However, his wife and nominator, Prabhjot Sarao, believes that professionals, at the very least, can do things right.
- Matthew "Matt" Young, 35, from Ottawa, Ontario, is a drug counsellor, youth worker and bachelor who is inexperienced with handiwork. He is nominated by his buddy, Kory Keogan, because he is tired of Matt constantly turning to him for advice.

== Synopsis ==
Contestant (with hard hat colour)	Nominator	1	2	3	4	5	6	7
Ajay	Prabhjot	IN	IMP	WORST	IN	WORST	IN	IN
Charlene	Charmaine	IN	IN	IMP	WORST	IN	IN	CWH
Dan	Natasha	IN	WORST	IN	IN	IN	M/W	IN
Matt	Kory	IMP	IN	IN	IN	IMP	IN	IN
Rob	Joe-Anne	WORST	IN	IN	IMP	IN	IN	IN

CWH – The contestant is Canada's Worst Handyman.
WORST – The contestant is the worst of the episode.
IN – The contestant was considered for the worst for this episode.
M/W – The contestant was named both the most improved and the worst for this episode.
IMP – The contestant is the most improved of the episode.

=== Episode 1: Check-In ===
Original airdate: May 2, 2011

After interviewing a record 900 nominations and after a screening process culled the field to 40, the five contestants arrive at the Handyman Rehabilitation Centre, where their nominators are waiting. As with previous years, each contestant is assigned a color-coded room. Ajay is given the blue room, Charlene is in purple, Dan in yellow, Matt in grey and Rob in orange. Each room has been locked from the inside by two locks, which they must remove from the outside before they can enter their room. Matt is the first to enter his room after Kory explains how a reciprocating saw works before helping him cut the locks. Rob smashes off his doorknob (something which baffles Joe-Anne, as the door itself wasn't actually locked) and causes substantial damage to the door itself before entering. Ajay is next to enter after chiselling the locks off his door. Charlene eventually enters after cutting the locks, leaving Dan last to enter their room. In each room, there is a heart-shaped bathtub that is to be installed, as well as their first challenge.

- The Vibrating Bed: The contestants must convert the queen-sized bed into a vibrating bed by attaching a vibrating motor. Matt passes in short order. Ajay fails after erroneously installing the vibrating motor underneath the bedframe rather than fitting it to the side. Charlene also fails for this reason. Rob, having already injured his hand, injures himself again trying to install it, so he fails (though his installation is correct). Dan also passes with ease.
    - Best Performer: Both Matt and Dan pass this challenge.
    - Worst Performer: While Rob failed due to injuring himself while installing the motor, both Ajay and Charlene did the worst due to installing the motor incorrectly.
- Home Challenge: The Heart-Shaped Box: Each season, there is one challenge that is done at home, before the contestants arrive in rehab. This year, the contestant must build a heart-shaped box from a single sheet of plywood. Matt proceeds to cut a heart free-hand with his own saw, a rip saw and so power saws were provided for him for this challenge. Despite this, he fails due to frustration, and ultimately only manages to produce a small, triangular box, which has a notch cut out an attempt to make it look like a heart. Ajay fails after building a box that is too big and has gappy sides. Rob injures himself and also has gappy sides, so he fails. Dan fails as his box is not heart-shaped (it is a rectangular box with a heart-shaped base). Charlene's box also is not heart-shaped (it is a rectangular box with a heart-shaped lid) and so fails.
- The Workbench Challenge: Each year since the second season, contestants are tasked with building a workbench as a working surface during construction. However, in this year's challenge, the workbench must be repurposed into a massage table in the final episode. The contestants may use the experts' table as a reference. Rob ends up building the best workbench, but is judged to have failed the challenge, since not only did he injure himself for the third time, he also injured Joe-Anne as well. Ajay builds a relatively decent workbench, but forgets to take into account the fact that it's supposed to become a massage table and makes it far too short for that purpose, leading to him failing. Matt's workbench seems solid, but when subjected to a "jump test" one of the main braces fractures. Charlene fails as her workbench lacks a top, having given up on cutting a top to size. Dan is the only handyman to pass the challenge, despite his table being a full sheet of plywood and his lower shelf being at floor level.
    - Best Performer: Dan is the only person to pass this challenge.
    - Worst Performer: Charlene did the worst by failing to get a sheet of plywood on her workbench.
- Group Challenge: The Bathroom Demolition: The group challenge this year is to renovate a common space into a spa. First, they must demolish a bathroom. The contestants mainly resort to a sledgehammer before proper tools are used, but Charlene quickly takes the rear by cleaning after the other four and not actively taking part in the demolition, laughing off the notion of actually doing so as being "men's work." Though the demolition is eventually completed, the toilet's water intake was never shut off, resulting in a surprising leak when the water is turned back on.

In the experts' evaluation, Gail and Geoff took Charlene's lack of participation to heart. No major criticisms were leveled at Dan, Ajay or Matt, but for Rob, Geoff warns that his door is a writeoff. Geoff names Charlene is the worst for the episode for being slow and not participating in the group challenge, while Gail names Rob as the worst due to constantly injuring himself. Despite Geoff believing that Rob had the best workmanship, he is named the worst, while Matt is named the most improved by virtue of fixing his workbench in his own time and doing relatively well despite having the least handiwork experience going into the show. For homework, Rob must build a "days without injury" sign. As he does this, he regales Andrew on his numerous injuries in the past.

Web extras for this episode:

- Danger!: Andrew and the experts comment on what they considered the most dangerous thing that they had seen on the show and the most common handyman mistake that they had seen on the show. Andrew believes that Deen Flett's initial entry in the previous season was the most dangerous (so much so that the camera crew had to intervene), before changing his mind and saying the massive plumbing leak in last year's group challenge as the kitchen was installed when he mentions destroying toilets with a sledgehammer as his most common handyman mistake. Geoff's nomination of the most dangerous thing was Joe "The Bullet" Barbaro's demolition work in his first year as an expert and his indiscriminate use of the sledgehammer which ultimately caused him to intervene, while he names mismeasuring as the most common handyman mistake. Gail names the incidents in last season's group challenges where Deen repeatedly drops a power cord of an angle grinder into a puddle, only to get shocked as he tries to pick it up as the most dangerous. Her candidate on what the most common handyman mistake is a lack of effort into planning ahead. All three agree that not reading and following instructions, however, is by far the most common cause of handyman mistakes; Andrew even believes that it happens at least once an episode in each of the six seasons.

=== Episode 2: Framed ===
Original airdate: May 9, 2011

- The Heart-Shaped Tub: Framing: Each episode will have one portion dedicated to installing a heart-shaped tub in their room. The first tub challenge is to build a frame for the tub to support on. Dan makes short work of framing the tub despite a few minor snags over the size of the tub and the speed of his pass even surprises him. Ajay makes the mistake of cutting the tub to its outside perimeter and making a one-inch strip from the cut-out portion as the bathtub's lip instead of cutting the heart shape itself one inch smaller. Matt builds a frame too large for his plywood, but he fails as he takes too long to adjust the frame down to size (having not been completed four hours into a challenge originally scheduled in three hours). Rob and Ajay also take too long to install a frame due to a lack of internal supports. Charlene also takes too long and fails.
    - Best Performer: Dan is the only one that passed this challenge.
    - Worst Performer: Matt, Rob, and Charlene fail due to taking too long past the time limit.
- The Tool Test: Gail administers a quick tool test to all the contestants. Of the 10 tools tested, Dan gets the most tools correct with 5/10, while Matt has the fewest with 1/10.
- The Soundproof Headboard: The contestants must install soundproof panels the size of a headboard. This involves precision mitre cuts for a frame as well as fitting fibreglass panelling between the frame paneling. Everyone cuts the mitre cuts incorrectly and only Rob does not have any troubles with the stapler or adhesives used to attach the framing pieces to the wall. He passes easily. Dan fails due to the panels lacking internal supports (admitting that the entire headboard must be redone on his own time), while both Matt and Ajay build their framework too large; Matt gives up after this, but Ajay is able to complete the task by cutting the fibreglass into small chunks and building a patchwork panel. Charlene falls behind again and only has a frame up with no paneling installed when time runs out.
    - Best Performer: Rob is the only one that passed this challenge.
    - Worst Performer: Charlene as she is the only nominee that did not get to installing her fiberglass.
- The Mirrors Over the Bed: The contestants must install a set of mirrors above their bed. Because Charlene has no completed projects up to this point, Gail personally assists Charlene in building a frame and installing the mirrors for a project well done. By comparison, the four men have a reference model in the lobby of the hotel to work off of. Rob is quickly finished with a pass. Dan actively discourages Natasha from helping, especially after he mismeasures; the ensuing stress from Dan beating himself up for his mistakes causes him to fail. Matt realizes that he made his frame too small and without the time needed to redo the frame and admitting that "the past few hours were all for nothing," he concedes defeat. Ajay, working quickly but in a manic mood (from issues such as taking forever to use a hammer drill to drill a hole into a concrete ceiling, not realizing that the hammer setting was off), eventually passes.
    - Best Performer: Rob and Ajay passed, but Rob's attempt is deemed the better of the two. While Charlene passed as well, she needed Gail's help to complete the challenge.
    - Worst Performer: Even though Matt failed due to mismeasuring his mirrors, Dan's attempt is deemed the worst due to his temper forcing Natasha out of the room.
- Group Challenge: The Reception Desk: Matt will lead the team in the building of a reception desk for the spa out of glass blocks. The team starts without a plan, with Ajay and Rob blindly following Matt's instructions. Charlene is demolishing the floor for a later group challenge (where a new floor is to be installed), while Dan cleans up the drywall from the demolition. After Geoff intervenes after it appears that Matt has forgotten the lessons taught to him, the desk building begins in earnest. However, the team ends up instead with a wall due to Matt having misunderstood what type of desk they were supposed to be making (thinking that the receptionist would stand behind it rather than sitting in a chair) and also neglecting to build a tabletop from the provided sheet of formica.

In expert evaluations, the experts advise Ajay on slowing down so as to avoid mistakes and hurting Prabhjot. Rob almost finished his tub in his spare time and no criticisms were levelled at him. Matt concedes defeat due to his incomplete work, while Charlene also admits that her jobs are incomplete. Geoff names Dan as the worst due to his self-admitted temper, but Gail names Charlene as the worst even after personally assisting in the mirror. After more debate, Ajay is named the most improved due to his perseverance and Dan is named the worst; Dan admits that it is because with Natasha, he completed the episode's most difficult challenge easily, but without Natasha, the easier projects this episode had fallen apart for him. For homework, Dan has to admit to needing help from Natasha in projects around the house.

Web extras for this episode:

- Ajay: Most Improved: Ajay reacts in bewilderment as he is named the most improved, but he likes being named due to the additional responsibility involved next episode. He also states a particular lesson learned en route to the golden hard hat in mismeasuring in the headboard challenge. Prabhjot also expresses her congratulations to her husband for his improvements. They also give thanks to Andrew and the experts in the decision.
- Dan: The Worst: Dan expresses that he deserved to be named the worst of the episode, even if Natasha had meant no harm in walking out on Dan during the mirror challenges, as well as their plans on resolving conflicts in the future. Natasha also mentions that things can only go up from there.

=== Episode 3: Trapped ===
Original airdate: May 16, 2011

- The Heart-Shaped Tub: The Trap: The contestants must install a trap as part of the tub installation. Two drains must be installed for the tub: one for the main drain and another for the overflow and both must connect to only one trap, which must be installed in the hotel's basement and connected to the hotel's existing system. Due to there only being two drills available for all the contestants, only Dan and Charlene have first access to the drills; Ajay, denied a drill by Natasha, instead grabs a jackhammer and uses the coring bit to cut a hole through the concrete floor, damaging both the floor and the bit and cutting a hole too big for his drain pipe. Furthermore, he attaches his pipes to the tub before installing his drains in the basement, and he places his trap too far away from his drains (by Ontario's codes, the trap may only be at most 60 cm from his drain). On top of all that, his pipes leak when tested. Needless to say, he fails. Matt originally misinterprets his notes from the lesson taught by Geoff (who will also test the traps by pouring a bucket of water into the drain pipes), but he eventually finishes his connection. However, beyond the trap his connection to the hotel's existing system runs uphill, so he fails. Neither Dan nor Rob encounter any issues in installing their drains to an acceptable quality and both pass. Charlene runs out of time and fails.
- The Heated Towel Rack: The contestants must install a ground fault circuit interrupter outlet in order to install a heated towel rack in their bathrooms. Rob, Matt and Charlene have no problems replacing the original outlet with the GFCI outlet; Dan is momentarily delayed by his color blindness, requiring Natasha to assist him in connecting the wires, while Ajay fails to comprehend the lesson and has to solicit Matt's advice to correctly hook up the outlet. Rob doesn't have any further issues in installing his rack, and passes in short order. Dan has trouble anchoring the towel rack to the wall due to trouble with the wall plugs and stripping screws, but otherwise passes. Charlene fails after failing to drill pilot holes to anchor in the screws and wearing out her screws. Ajay's rack is mounted, but he destroys his drill bit in making pilot holes and he cuts off his wall plugs after failing to fully recess them, so he fails. Matt also admits defeat without installing the towel rack after spending 80 minutes trying to install the anchors, compared to the five that he took to change the outlet.
- The Hanging Chairs: The contestants must install a chair which is to be suspended from the ceiling. Due to unsteady hands by everyone, at least one of the two hanging eye hooks needed was too large for their anchors, but a copper wire trick that Andrew teaches to each of the contestants manages to make Charlene, Matt and Ajay pass without much additional effort. Rob's installation is also fine, except that he injures himself installing one of the holes. Dan both rejects the copper wire trick and he injures himself and fails.
- Group Challenge: The Living Wall: In this group challenge, Ajay must lead the group into installing a living wall: a wall with plants mounted sideways on it that waters itself. The supply company had quoted a two-hour installation time and a $500 cost and cost-conscious Ajay is given five hours for this task. Rob and Dan take charge of the needed plumbing, while the other three watch an instructional video on how to mount the pipe. Ajay presses Dan and Rob for progress in the plastic plumbing, in which Dan must take lessons from Geoff on how to use it, as he has never used the materials before. Geoff is also forced to bail out Ajay in installing the electrical system needed for the plants to water themselves, which only use up more time; a series of unnecessary cuts had caused Matt and Charlene to compromise on the original wall design. In short, after five hours nothing is installed correctly.

While the contestants did the group challenge, the nominators paint their nominees' rooms. Dan's "Tacky Room" (now in red) is criticized for the ultimately poor job in anchoring in the towel rack and hanging chair. Matt's "Honeyroom Suite for a Guy" (now in brown) is commended for his progress in thinking and planning due to the work in his room proper, but he admits defeat in his bathroom. Geoff is also concerned for Ajay's safety and his tub installation when his room was inspected; Ajay's room has also been repainted red. Rob (whose room is still orange) admits that injuring himself during the hanging chair challenge would make him the worst, though it was ultimately overlooked by the experts. Gail nominates Ajay as the worst due to him rushing his work and displaying what she felt was an arrogant attitude. Geoff nominates Matt as the worst, feeling that he had showed no understanding of his mistakes in the drain challenge and that the overall quality of his work had taken a sharp downturn in the last two episodes. Andrew ultimately sides with Gail in naming Ajay as the worst of the episode, due to having used the jackhammer, a two-handed tool, unsafely with one hand. For homework, Ajay must fix his plumbing while Andrew lectures him on safety. The most improved is Charlene (whose room is in a darker shade of purple) due to finally finishing a project with the hanging chairs and the fact that her work is correct, if only a bit slow.

Web extras for this episode:

- The Worst: Ajay: Ajay expresses surprise at being the worst and blames it on not taking things seriously; in particular, he regrets his decision to use the jackhammer to cut the holes for his drains.
- Most Improved: Charlene: Charlene thanks the experts for noticing her improvement, before adjusting the golden hard hat for her size. She expresses (after some difficulty) her reasons for improving despite her slow pace, since she does not redo things. She also states that a contributing factor to her being most improved is being dressed appropriately for work. Charmaine also expresses her congratulations at the self-proclaimed "underdog" and that their sister relationship is like "two halves of a brain," before expressing her desire to redecorate the golden hard hat so it would look less fitting for the men.

=== Episode 4: Room Service ===
Original airdate: May 23, 2011

- The Heart-Shaped Tub: Plumbing: The contestants must install the running water into their tubs by tapping into an existing plumbing line. After an extensive lesson by Geoff on how to install the shutoff valve, Ajay can't get his solder to stick due to holding the torch too far away and due to the water, so he inexplicably sprays the joint with more water. The other contestants also have similar problems, but Rob quickly addresses it by plugging the pipe with bread, having learned the trick from Geoff in the previous group challenge. However, Dan, who was also taught this trick by Geoff the previous day, doesn't pick up as quickly, but everyone eventually pick up on this trick. Ajay fails as he nearly burns himself with the torch after nearly dropping it. Rob's plumbing works and he passes, but he builds his pipes above the level of his tub deck. Matt's cold water pipe works fine, but he twists and ultimately destroys his hot water pipe in the process of unclogging bread from his pipe for a water test, so he fails, though the rest of his plumbing is noted to be fine. Dan fails as his pipes leak (though it is a minor issue, as Andrew notes). Charlene, having installed a T pointing down toward the floor at a 45° angle, ends up slicing off the whole pipe in her efforts to fix it and so is forced to restart from the beginning well after everyone else is finished.
    - Best Performer: Rob is the only one to pass this challenge as he managed to get water running without any leaks or damaging the pipes.
    - Worst Performer: Even though Charlene failed to get her plumbing finished, Ajay's attempt is judged to be the worst due to nearly burning himself with his torch.
- The Stereo Speakers: The contestants must install stereo speakers that are to be recessed into the walls of their rooms over their tubs. For this challenge, the nominators will be paired with someone other than their nominee. Matt, paired with Joe-Anne, confuses electrical wire for speaker wire and is forced to turn to Kory (in Charlene's room) for advice. In the end, he can only get one speaker installed and fails. Despite a minor hiccup in forgetting to secure his electrical box for the amplifier unit (causing the speaker wire to fall off the wall), Rob (with Charmaine) passes. Dan (with Prabhjot) installs the speakers without much trouble, albeit with one slightly higher than the other, but is deemed to have failed due mixing his plaster improperly and doing an extremely messy job of covering the wires. Ajay (with Natasha) is forced to bite to strip his wire and installs his speakers vertically, meaning that the sound will not be in stereo. Still, his connections are fine (though there is a knot in the wire neither notices) and he passes. Kory is forced to do most of the grunt work in Charlene's challenge and is forced to intervene when he tries to get Charlene to do her own work, only for her to mud over the groove in which she was to install her speaker wire without having installed her wire or electrical box. She fails.
    - Best Performer: Both Rob and Ajay passed this challenge, but Rob's attempt is deemed better due to placing his speakers in a proper stereo space.
    - Worst Performer: Charlene fails due to being the only one that did not get her speakers wired.
- The Breakfast Table: The contestants must create a table that can be used to serve breakfast in bed. The contestants must copy one of five randomly chosen designs. Matt, with two matching "his and hers" tables, has trouble installing his top pieces level. Though he tries to shim the difference with washers, they fall out and he fails. Rob's folding table impresses Joe-Anne so much that she wants one for their home. Ajay finishes his round table quickly and, despite initially being chastised by Andrew for being flimsy, passes after further strengthening his tabletop. Natasha manages to rein in Dan's frustration over his cantilevered table to get him to pass. Charlene fails as she tries to make a top for her table, meant to go over the whole bed, out of a single poplar board; she ultimately gives up without doing any real work on the challenge.
    - Best Performer: Rob, Ajay, and Dan passed this challenge, but Rob's attempt is deemed better as his table was built without any hassles.
    - Worst Performer: While Matt failed the challenge, Charlene did the worst as her tabletop is nothing but a narrow plank of board.
- Group Challenge: The Ethanol Fireplace: Charlene must lead the men to build a frame around an ethanol fireplace. Charlene is convinced by the four to quickly set the instructions aside and follow their well-meaning but ultimately bad advice and instead, they embed the fireplace into the hotel's exterior wall. The other four quickly take charge and Charlene is quickly relegated to watching the other four at work, being unable to assert herself. To add insult to injury, they run short of the faux brick that was meant to cover a frame that was to be built to accommodate their fireplace.

The Group Challenge had left Charlene in tears, having lost her focus. Her failures were attributed to hearing too much cross-talk and being too distracted and "over-thinking." Matt admits to various major failures from minor mistakes (though he eventually finishes his tables by installing another set of brackets that fit), while Dan is chastised over his temper. Rob is commended for the best table, while Ajay is chastised over the poor plastering job. In a rare unanimous decision, the experts and Andrew name Rob as the most improved and Charlene the worst. For homework, Charlene must cut out the letters "focus" out of a piece of plywood.

Web extras for this episode:

- Worst: Charlene: Charlene had fully expected to be named the worst and how her homework was extremely difficult; she could only finish cutting three of the five letters before losing focus. She reiterates her focus on improving her focus, including during the confessional itself when she has difficulty expressing this.
- Most Improved: Rob: Rob feels exhilarated at being named the most improved, but he still expresses concern that his occasional hyperactivity could cause him to hurt himself. He particularly likes Charlene's modifications to the golden hard hat, though he also states that a few other contestants could have won it instead. A particular lesson learned was during the speaker challenge, especially burying when burying the wire in the drywall. He also expresses his nervousness at the group challenge (which he knows will either be the sauna or the steam generator) and makes it a point to read the directions before formulating a plan. Joe-Anne in the confessional also expresses her congratulations, though she cannot stop laughing at Rob wearing the golden hard hat. Rob also expresses his regret at his actions during the group challenge and he takes the blame for possibly leading Charlene astray.

=== Episode 5: Down The Drain ===
Original airdate: May 30, 2011

- The Heart-Shaped Tub: The Drain: The contestants must finish any incomplete plumbing work to their heart-shaped tub and install their heart-shaped tubs into their tub decks. For Rob, it involves building a box to cover his overhanging plumbing from the previous episode, while Dan and Ajay must fix their leaky shutoff valves. For Charlene, who has a massive backlog, her husband, Dave, arrives at the Handyman Rehabilitation Centre on his day off work to help her finish the job. In addition to installing their tubs, they must install their bathtub drains. Matt is the only one to install his drains without issues and spends the bulk of his drain installation fixing his leaky faucet. Dan and Rob had mismeasured their overflow drains and a botched drain installation causes him to waste over four hours of his time, even with Matt's and Kory's assistance.
- The Heart-Shaped Tub: The Waterproof Membrane: After the drains are installed, the waterproof membrane is to be installed on top. Matt is the only one ready for it at first, but Rob quickly finishes his repair work and passes his challenge before Matt passes, due to accidentally installing his membrane upside-down. Dan runs out of time fixing his plumbing and he is unable to start his waterproofing. Neither does Ajay, who had to remove some of his hastily installed work from earlier episodes. Charlene isn't even that far along due to the fact that her tub deck isn't anywhere near complete (let alone the plumbing), but with both Dave's and Charmaine's assistance, Charlene manages to finish the deck; before he leaves, however, he applauds Charlene's progress in rehab so far.
- The Toilet: The contestants must replace the toilets in their bathrooms. Dan resorts to smashing his toilet in frustration after the two bolts stubbornly refuse to come off. Matt accidentally drops a bolt into his toilet drain and must resort to sticking his hand in the drain in order to retrieve the bolt, much to his chagrin. He fails the challenge after failing to find the bolt and giving up. Despite initially attaching the toilet tank to the bottom of the toilet bowl, Ajay manages to pass. Dan also passes without incident. Rob also manages to install his tub successfully, though he is slightly unsanitary at his task. Testing Charlene's toilet installation causes all her bathtub pipes to leak and burst, making her fail.
- The Curtain: The contestants must create curtains for their room from fabric of their choosing. Charlene, an experienced hand with a sewing machine, quickly passes her challenge, while Dan quickly backs out of the challenge due to nerves, and lets Natasha do the curtains. Similarly, Ajay fails as he chose to have Prabhjot assemble them. Rob fails due to a combination of nerves and having curtains mismatched in length. Matt manages to create his curtains with no issues, but turns what would otherwise have been a pass into a fail by deciding to attach "he scores" lettering into his black curtains by using wood glue rather than sewing them.
- Group Challenge: The Sauna and the Floor: Rob must lead the group in installing a prefab sauna as well as tongue-and-groove "click" flooring in the spa, the latter of which he delegates to Dan, Ajay and Charlene. Rob and Matt assemble the prefab sauna without much trouble; however, Dan is confused by Rob's vague directive on the direction the floor is to be laid out and they manage to install the floor contrary to Rob's plan. Rob also is forced to repeatedly intervene in minor decisions such as how to cut the flooring. In the end, the floor is incomplete, but the sauna is complete.

In inspections, Matt's tub is commended, but the toilet bolt incident and his use of glue (rather than sewing) earns him the experts' scorn. Charlene and Dan had no substantial criticisms or compliments leveled at them. Rob's work is commended, but he personally takes the responsibility for misallocating the work in the group challenge. Ajay's toilet, his only success, is found to leak, dampening his mood, as none of his other challenges succeeded. In deliberation, Gail names Ajay as the worst over his poor workmanship, while Charlene was named the worst by Andrew for her tub still lacking a membrane and her pipes bursting. In the end, Geoff sides with Gail and Ajay is named the worst for a second time, while Matt is named the most improved due primarily to the tub work. For homework, Ajay must tally the time and money that he has wasted from cutting corners.

Web extras for this episode:

- Matt: Most Improved: Matt expresses his desire to learn and that being the most improved is indicative of his learning progress. He also had liked Charlene's decorations on the golden hard hat compared to the plain hat that he had won in the first episode. He also feels for Ajay being named the worst, as he felt that he had worked hard in his challenges. As for whether he deserved it, he states that learning something new and doing it well made him worthy of the golden hard hat. On the upcoming group challenge, he states that he already has a loose strategy in mind: to have the others work in pairs on loose ends if there is work that does not require everyone to be involved. He reiterates his desire to learn and the desire to take his learning experience back to Ottawa and do things in his home that he could not do before. He then goes on to say that being able to "adjust on the fly" due to various gaps in his understanding of the instructions has been a valuable asset learned in the last group challenge and that the sewing machine is the scariest tool he has learned to use so far; his reason being that it works smoothly if set up properly but not at all if something goes wrong. He finishes off by saying that the positive can-do attitude of the contestants has led to accomplishments in the group challenge that none of them had been able to do on their own.
- Ajay: The Worst: Ajay expresses his exasperation at the amount of money wasted, as calculated in his homework; the estimate was double the amount that he estimated a professional would charge. Still, he is undeterred and believes that if he catches up on his tub work he would be unbeatable.

=== Episode 6: Easier Said Than Done ===
Original airdate: June 6, 2011

- The Heart-Shaped Tub: Tiling: The contestants must lay tile on their tub decks. Neither Charlene nor Ajay are ready for tiles as their tub decks are not fully installed (and their tiles and Dan's also, will be installed without waterproofing due to Matt having used up all their waterproofing in the last episode), so the experts assist in completing their decks so as to level the playing field. As for the challenge itself, after a brief one-line lesson from Geoff on how to use tile adhesive (to read the instructions that come with the adhesive) and a longer lesson from Gail on how to tile, the challenge begins in earnest. Charlene had chosen difficult glass tiles which require more finesse, while Matt and Rob use larger tiles; Dan's and Ajay's tiles are ceramic tiles of medium size. Dan manages to use his tile spacers incorrectly, but he tiles his entire tub before realizing his error; he runs out of time and fails before he can dig out the spacers. Matt manages to pass after several initial troubles with cutting tiles upside-down. Rob injures himself repeatedly and has only two courses of tiles before he runs out of time and fails. Ajay also fails due to taking too long and installing his tiles in an asymmetrical manner, contrary to Gail's directive; he also manages to short out the light fitting in his room after failing to fit the water guard on his tile cutter, which consequently squirts a large jet of water onto the light. The difficulty of Charlene's work causes her to run out of time and fail, though most of the tiles which do not require cutting are up.
- The Four-Poster Bed: The contestants must install a four-poster bed from old metal fence posts and scaffolding. A reference model is available for the contestants to work off. Matt makes short work of his cuts and installation, and passes; he and Kory then use their remaining time assisting Charlene and Charmaine. Dan's hatred of Allen keys leads him to frustration, but he eventually passes. Rob's frame is impeded by a bulkhead and due to failing to account for it, he fails. Ajay fails out of frustration, after he installs his pipes of different lengths in the wrong positions.
- The Nameplate: The contestants must make nameplates for their rooms, matching their chosen room styles, using a router, on a single pine board. It's a special occasion for Ajay and Prabhjot (the "Bollywood Lovebirds"), as the challenge is done on the anniversary of their arranged marriage, and they finish without issues. Matt ("Honeymoon Suite for a Guy... and Gal") fails to measure his sign before mounting it, and fails. Rob easily finishes his "Eden of the North" nameplate without issues. Dan ("The Sexy Tack Shack") also finishes without issues. Charlene ("Slam and Glam") is too slow on her router and burns the wood in a number of places, before taking the odd decision to cover the sign in black paint; she fails the challenge.
- Group Challenge: The Steam Generator: Matt will lead the team in installing a steam generator. Ajay and Charlene continue in the flooring from the last episode, while Dan and Rob take care of the steam generator's plumbing; Charlene is also tasked with building a seat for the steam generator, which turns out too large for its space. Despite various minor obstacles, the steam generator is eventually installed, though it does not run; Dan had incorrectly assumed that the 13-pin connector for the thermostat was supposed to be screwed on rather than inserted and broke off several of the pins. However, the flooring remains incomplete.

In inspections, Gail and Geoff admonish Ajay for partially complete projects and an ultimately patchy tile job, though he is commended for the sign. No major criticisms were levelled against Matt (though Geoff is concerned with his tile cuts around the tub), while Charlene is admonished for her poor workmanship in her sign (which is nearly unreadable) and her short four-poster bed, causing Geoff to name her as the worst. Rob also admits that he has a lot of work to do, causing Gail to nominate him for the worst. Dan is also admonished for his tiling mishap and for breaking the thermostat in the group challenge and because of this Andrew nominates him as the worst. The most improved is, for the first time in the series, left completely up to the contestants themselves and they agree on giving Dan the golden hard hat (with only Ajay giving the sole dissenting view; he had nominated Matt). As for the worst, Dan is named as such for not following the show's central lesson: reading the instructions (he joins Terry Cress from the second season and Johnnie Bachusky from the fourth season as the only nominees to be named the most improved and the worst in the same episode; both Terry and Johnnie were ultimately named Canada's Worst Handyman at the end of their respective seasons for poor attitude and work ethic and slow progress, respectively). For homework, Dan must read the instructions that he missed.

Web extras for this episode:

- Dan expresses his regret at not having followed the instructions to lay his spacers as directed on the tiling adhesive bag, and his frustration over how not reading it may have ruined his tile job. He states that he may not have deserved it, but it did do its job in driving the point home. He also believes that it was an honour for his peers to name him the most improved, because of the differences between believing that he is most improved and having other people tell him that he is most improved. Overall, he believes that having finally won the hard hat despite being named the worst is a bittersweet experience, and that the two together must have meant that he was "absolutely brutal" before. Natasha, in the confessional, is happy that Dan won the golden hard hat, but she also expresses concern that it was his peers that awarded him the golden hard hat and not the experts, but Dan sets his concerns aside. Natasha then states that Dan fully deserves the golden hard hat and that he is more confident than ever before, being a great workhorse for the team in the group challenges.

=== Episode 7: The Verdict ===
Original airdate: June 13, 2011

- The Massage Table: The contestants must turn their workbenches into massage tables by covering the top of the workbench with foam and a vinyl covering, as planned in the first episode. Charlene, whose workbench had lacked a top for over six episodes, has a top installed by the experts for this challenge to help her speed up. However, she still runs out of time, having not even started to stretch the vinyl around the hole for the head and fails. Dan's table is finished without issues, though Natasha finishes the head hole. Matt had neglected to cut the foam over the hole and he eventually botches his job after trying unsuccessfully to cut out the foam from underneath. Ajay rushes through the table, cutting a head hole too large and fails in frustration. Rob also fails to fully stretch the vinyl, failing the challenge.
- Group Challenge: The Spa's Finish: As the peer-nominated foreman, Dan must lead the team in completing their spa. Dan himself is finishing on a reception table, Ajay is finishing the living wall, while Charlene and Matt proceed to finish the floor. Because of the slow pace, the experts intervene and assist Matt in installing the floor, while Charlene shifts to painting and other decorative aspects of the spa. Rob is working on drywall and thresholds, while Ajay and Matt proceed to install the baseboards. The contestants finish the spa on a $10,000 budget, with roughly 22 man-hours of work. The nominators are the first to test out the spa and give it a rave review.
- The To-Do List: The contestants, in their final challenge, must complete all of their incomplete challenges so their rooms are presentable. As with previous years, each task on the to-do list must be done in the order prescribed therein (roughly corresponding to the order in which they are introduced). Dan hits a snag on the first item (the soundproof headboard), but eventually finishes to work on getting the dug-in spacers out of his bathtub tiles. Matt chews through the first three items easily, though his towel rack returns to frustrate him. He soon completes it to work on grouting his tiles. Rob has time to assist Charlene in her tub drains, though her tub's water intakes still leak. Ajay is doing his tasks out of order (grouting before his cold water pipes are installed), which isn't helping him go any faster; most of his time is focused on the tub's plumbing. By the time Ajay's tub is complete, Matt's entire room is complete and only decorations remain. Rob's room and Dan's room both finish soon after, while Charlene and Ajay end up cutting corners to meet the deadline.

For final inspections, a group of three newlywed couples will be evaluating each room. Matt's room is first to be evaluated and is quickly shot down on the theme, though his tub is commended. Items are popping off in Dan's room, from tiles to wainscotting, leaving Dan pessimistic about his chances of not being named Canada's Worst Handyman. Ajay's room is considered to have worse craftsmanship compared to Dan, but better design. Rob's room is deemed the best by the honeymooners (though there were still glaring issues such as a splinter from the breakfast table), while Charlene's room is unanimously named the worst, mostly because she was never able to get her plumbing working and had to resort to using a hosepipe to fill her tub. In expert evaluations, Geoff expresses his disappointment in Ajay, while Matt expresses his enjoyment in doing handiwork. Rob admits he still has to work on not injuring himself, while Dan also admits in helping to work with his wife. Charlene admits to learning a lot, even if she needed help from other contestants or the experts in speeding up on a number of occasions. Rob is quickly agreed to be nowhere near the worst of the group, as despite the occasional accident he managed a relatively decent quality of work throughout and finished the most tasks. Matt is also agreed to definitely not be the worst, having made impressive progress from the start of the season and also doing some solid work. Harsher words are given to Dan, whose work the experts consider to be generally mediocre and they also note that he continued to make the same mistakes (particularly not reading instructions) throughout the season; even with that, however, they agree that his work is not the worst of the five and Natasha adds that she feels a lot more comfortable working with him now. Ajay and Charlene are therefore left as the bottom two and Geoff and Gail both name Ajay as Canada's Worst Handyman, as his claims of success do not match the reality of his results and they felt that he ultimately learned nothing from his time on the show. However, Andrew does not accept the results, stating that Charlene should be Canada's Worst Handyman as she frequently needed help to complete her assignments, whereas, despite almost always rushing to finish (to not much success, no less), Ajay did more work himself. However, both experts argue that Charlene has at least learned her lessons and that, even though his work was better than hers, Ajay should be named the worst as a means of deflating his overconfidence. Still, both experts eventually capitulate to Andrew and Charlene is declared the first (and only) woman to be Canada's Worst Handyman. With Matt managing to avoid being named Canada's Worst Handyman, he joins Darryl Andrews from the first season, Desmond "Dez" Nanassy from the third season and Brian Macdonald from the fourth season as the only nominees to not be named as such in a single episode.
