= Junk Raiders 2 =

- Developed by: Proper Television
- Starring: Geoff Woodmansey; Gordie Wornoff; Tom Mourgas; Merv Lane; Katarina Tompkins; Paul Graham; Andy Berry; John Johnson; Martin Leifhebber; Matthew Cohen
- Narrated by: Peter Ruprecht
- Country of origin: Canada
- Original language: English
- No. of episodes: 6

Production
- Executive producer: Guy O'Sullivan
- Running time: 60 minutes (including commercials)

Original release
- Network: Discovery Channel Canada (Canada); ION Television (United States)
- Release: March 21 – April 25, 2011

Related
- Junk Raiders; Junk Raiders 3

Junk Raiders 2 is the second season of the Canadian reality television series that airs on The Discovery Channel and ION Life. The series follows the titular Junk Raiders, a team of eight professionals as they attempt to renovate a site in Toronto's Don Valley (on Bayview Avenue) and renovate it to a two-story "clubhouse" in one month with only a C$5000 budget, as part of the Evergreen Brick Works project. Because of the extremely limited budget, many of the materials needed must be found by freecycling: finding something unwanted for free and reusing it.

== The Team ==
The team consists of the following members, both new and returning:

- Geoff Woodmansey returns for the second season of the series. Besides from his work on this show and on Canada's Worst Handyman, he spends his time renovating homes in some of Toronto's most exclusive neighborhoods.
- Gordie Wornoff, the only other returning member, is a salvager who salvages as a way of life. He is skilled in carpentry, having built his house from repurposed wood, and he is also a freegan, regularly eating otherwise good food that has been disposed of.
- Andy Berry is the team's designer. He has designed residences, commercial spaces, and film sets. His ideals match that of the show, as his specialty is sourcing materials from junkyards and making them look pristine.
- Paul Graham is the team's tech expert. The president of OpenLuna, an organization that seeks to get folks on the moon, he is also the builder behind "Beer-bot", a beverage-dispensing robot that keeps beer out of children's hands.
- John Johnson is an inventor whose invention, the "Scoop-It Pooper Scooper", helped him pay for his first home. He is working on an invention that generates electricity from food scraps which he envisions could power large cities.
- Merv Lane has spent 25 years in the steel trades, having helped build some of the largest steel structures in North America.
- Tom Mourgas is a Greek blacksmith. He lives an old-fashioned lifestyle, from his way of life, not owning a computer or cell phone, to his way of plying his craft.
- Katrina Tompkins is a Sheridan college graduate from 2009 from the Crafts and Design: Furniture Program.

The team's client is Evergreen, a nonprofit organization in charge of the Brick Works project, a massive restoration project eight years in the making. Representing them is Martin Leifhebber, their architect, and Matthew Cohen, their senior project manager.

== Synopsis ==
=== Episode 1 - Days 1-3 ===
Original airdate: March 21, 2011

The team is introduced to a project from their warehouse in Toronto's west end: a clubhouse whose second story is made from two halves of a shipping container, with various artistic features adorning both floors of the site. The entire clubhouse will be built in their warehouse, and to be shipped over to the brickworks at the end of the project and assembled onsite. While Tom, Merv, and Katarina get to cutting the shipping container, Gordie and John are ordered to spend $1000 for 380 feet (120 m) of steel (much to both of their chagrins), used to reinforce the weakened shipping container. They head off to the site which had donated the shipping container, with instructions to haggle as necessary. The steel they need cost $60 more than what they have (if HST was taken into account), so they negotiate down to 200 feet (61 m) of new steel and various scrap fixings (intending to weld the rest together to make up the difference). Gordie and John also stop by Gordie's own shop for some of his stockpiled materials. The materials, however, disappoint Geoff (as he believes welded-together scrap will never meet building codes) and the rest of the team, and he takes out his frustrations on John (and less so on Gordie). Meanwhile, Andy gets cracking on the design of the living space, and Paul is tasked to start an online campaign to secure the recycled materials that they need.

On the second day, the entire team (with Geoff) visit the Brickworks, where they also meet the clients, who have slightly (but not significantly) altered their plans to include a feature known as the "firefly". They also take the opportunity to salvage unused material from the Brickworks for various projects: John has secured an old motor and fan that he plans to convert into a wind generator to power the lights needed for the firefly, while Katrina has salvaged a large pipe for at least two pieces of furniture. However, they are unable to use everything that they salvage: a set of stairs (which they cannot use as-is due to building codes) they had thought of reusing is found to contain lead paint.

On Day 3, Paul's online campaign has paid off, and he and Gordie secure parts from a local bicycle repair depot. While putting posters around the neighborhood (asking residents to donate useful materials for their project), they also spot a local contractor, who allow Gordie and Paul to scavenge from his dumpster. This junk haul helps the team cool off their tensions (especially between Merv and Tom, who briefly argue over one being a gofer to the other): John now can run his generator using the motor from a scooter rather than the older motor from the fan. Tom, however, is reserved about the use of some of the resourced metal, but he is assuaged by the fact that Geoff intends to sell off any metal that they cannot use. The crew spends the rest of the day inventorying the junk and finishing Katrina's and John project.

The clients arrive, and are impressed by the progress so far. However, they are reserved on Andy's design, and specifically requests that the fan blades on John's fan be made larger and that Katrina's wall-mounted table be clear-coated to a matte finish. The team is happy with the great results so far, even if only $4000 remains in their budget.

Deleted Scene: The deleted scene from this episode is from Day 1, where Tom is adamant that the bottle of special water that he brings from home each day is cold when he needs it. Geoff is willing to accommodate him, but Merv believes that Tom is being too much of a diva.

=== Episode 2 - Days 4-7 ===
Original airdate: March 28, 2011

Day 4 begins with Geoff ordering Tom and Merv to continue the structural work on the containers, while Katrina and John are tasked with their projects. Meanwhile, Paul is tasked to search for free structural steel desperately needed by Tom and Merv, while Gordie and Andy head off with a hot tip on the junk hotline; apparently, an elderly handyman (who also abided by the freecycling philosophy) had moved into a retirement home, and all of his stockpiled tools and materials are up for grabs. While the trip proved fruitful, they are still short windows and structural steel. Andy promptly takes the recovered hardwood flooring for a table project, but Geoff is forced to dip into the budget for the desperately needed steel.

By day 5, they are still short on steel, and because Paul could not source the steel, Geoff sends Merv and Gordie to a scrapyard across the city (on McCowan Road in York Region) with $500 for the needed steel. They spend $300 on a series of older steel pipes to use as structural support, along with a series of truck and bus doors, intending to use them as the container's windows. However, they are short $90 on new steel, so he decides to pay the difference out of his own pocket. Meanwhile, Katrina and Andy finishes their project, and Paul is tasked on a project that would let people open the container door from the inside, using mostly bicycle parts. Andy switches gears and uses even more bike parts for a lounge chair as a recovered treadmill. When Gordie and Merv return, Geoff and Tom are concerned with the older (and possibly rusted) pipes, but Geoff is nevertheless forced to reimburse the $90 to Merv, and is sold on Gordie's idea to repurpose the truck and bus doors for windows.

Day 6 begins with Geoff getting Tom and Merv competing against each other to see who would finish restructuring their half of the container first. The general consensus is that while Tom may be faster, Merv is more likely to finish with better quality, and indeed this is the case when both finish - so much so that Geoff is concerned with the quality of his work. Geoff, however, is more concerned with Paul's project, as he believes Paul is working too slowly. Geoff also begins work on 4 crib walls needed on the first floor, but they lack the structural steel. Andy suggests that they make the crib walls out of wood (also in short supply) despite Geoff's reservations that the clients would insist on metal. Gordie and Katrina are off in search for wood, but find much more than that, including plywood, steel pipe, scrap metal, and chain-link fencing, all of which are desperately needed. Meanwhile, John's windmill is finished, with the larger fan blades taken from the cut-out portions of the shipping container.

Paul's project is sadly incomplete on Day 7, while Tom is tasked with a safety railing to accompany Paul's door opener. However, Merv also reminds Tom that he needs to finish his somewhat spotty work on the container. The clients arrive in the afternoon, and are immediately impressed with the windmill, which has also been painted yellow to match a sunflower found on the outside of the brickworks, as well as Katrina's chair/table combination and Tom's railing. They are also impressed by Tom and Merv's overall work, as Matthew's previous experience with renovating shipping containers had taken three times as long. They are less impressed by Andy's table, and is ultimately reserved on the windows from truck and car doors. They ultimately reject the wooden crib walls due to the industrial aesthetic of the brickworks, but is willing to concede a redesign so that less metal is used. To make things worse, the rusty pipes cannot be used for any project at all, rendering it a potential white elephant, which they cannot afford with $3410 left in their budget.

Deleted Scene: The deleted scene from this episode is from Day 3, where Paul shares his fascination with space travel to Gordie. Gordie is somewhat reserved in his reaction, due to his environmentalist ways.

=== Episode 3 - Days 8-10 ===
Original airdate: April 4, 2011

Day 8 begins with Merv finishing the container, Tom on the railing, John and Paul on the door opener, Gordie to find sinks for a sink wall, Katrina on furniture projects, and Andy on more design work. While on the road looking for metal sinks and finding only cheap plastic ones, Gordie gets a hit on the junk hotline, where he manages to get 20000 smoke-damaged wine corks. The lack of anything of immediate use adds to Geoff's troubles, already at a high due to Paul spending too much time on the door opener. Geoff issues an ultimatum on the door: finish it or demolish it in two hours. After Gordie invites Geoff on a trip raiding the Canadian National Exhibition (Day 8 being Labour Day, the last day of the Exhibition) for possible crib wall supplies, Geoff leaves Andy in charge of the door opener's fate. However, Martin arrives unannounced just after Geoff leaves, leaving Andy to receive Martin's crib wall redesign. Martin also signs off on Andy's window layout, opening the way for Merv to install the window. Andy also approves of Paul's and John's work after one door is finished in the door opener.

Day 9 marks the halfway point of the build in the workshop. However, Geoff is worried that they will not have the manpower needed to finish the steel work, and is contemplating dipping into the budget to hire another iron worker; even reassigning John to the iron work isn't enough. However, Tom and Merv balk at the thought of adding manpower due to morale issues, but the thought makes the crew work harder. Meanwhile, Gordie and Katrina hit a site near Bathurst Street and Lawrence Avenue to assist in a house demolition, and make off with most of the materials there. That night, Geoff makes good on his intention of hiring a steel worker for some overnight work on the steel supports that will prop the container up on the second storey.

Day 10 starts with $2550 left in the budget, after the new steel ($500) and iron worker ($360) expenses are deducted. Geoff is concerned that there is no substantial progress in completed projects, and decides to hide the incomplete projects so to avoid Martin and Matthew rejecting their progress. However, the wetland rail is installed despite the door not being fully functional. When the clients arrive, Geoff uses the partially completed door opener, but they are concerned with the railing being a climbing hazard. They are reserved on the window installations, the supporting structure, especially the fact that they only have 3 of the 80 sinks needed for the sink wall. The time crunch is officially on, and Geoff is adamant that the pace must be picked up in order for the work to be finished on time.

Deleted Scene: The deleted scene from this episode is from Day 8, where Geoff is riding Paul for taking too long to finish the door, even having to divert John from helping Merv with the steel work to finish it. Paul takes exception to Geoff's "eight days" assertion due to having done other tasks between working on the door.

=== Episode 4 - Days 11-13 ===
Original airdate: April 11, 2011

Day 11 begins with Andy starting on the kitchen, John and Paul on a water purification system, Katrina on various furniture project, Merv and Tommy on further structural work, and Gordie as a spare body. For John, this is not a new project (having once created a water purification system for an entire town from recycled parts), and Geoff is amazed with the design. However, Geoff is adamant that everyone has a parts list so that he knows what to buy, and Merv and Tom's parts list would be sucking up most of the budget ($2000) on the metal stairs, even with a 20% discount that Tom had fought hard to obtain. However, the materials that everyone else needs beyond the steel would easily break the bank. Later in the day, Gordie and John are off to Steam Whistle Brewing for recycled parts; the brewery is expanding and thus have a lot to recycle. Among the parts that they have scored are parts desperately needed for the purification system. Meanwhile, Merv and Tom are at odds over how the stairs are to be built; Tom is adamant that he does things "old-school" with chalk lines on the floor of the shop, while Merv is adamant that Tom use a calculator.

Day 12 begins with Geoff running out of money, and he is turning to Gordie for desperately needed parts. Gordie and Andy head off to an old drive-in theater, where they can raid a storage container for parts. Meanwhile, the parts order has cost more than what anyone expected, and Geoff is forced to beg the crew to pay for the steel. Geoff is forced to tell the whole team that they are broke after Gordie and Andy return. The team is furious, as they forced to sell some of the unneeded metal for any new items. The scrap nets Geoff $360, which placates him. What isn't, though, is Tom's refusal to use a calculator, and though Merv is reluctant to follow Tom's old-school method, Geoff and Tom get into a shouting match, which in turn leads to Tom walking off the job in anger.

Geoff and Tom make up at the start of Day 13, but Tom suddenly decides to do things Merv's way. There is another setback, however, as they had mismeasured some of the stairs, wasting some of their valuable metal and time. Paul had also found a buyer for one of their spare cast iron sinks for $200. Geoff is also concerned about how to fill in the crib walls, as their crushed glass wall seems too heavy (but Geoff is hopeful that the cork, which they have in plentiful supply, can be used as a substitute). However, they also manage to finish a brick wall from the wall the clients rejected earlier. Meanwhile, Andy and Katrina's kitchen is raising issues from the incomplete appearance, and Geoff ultimately decides to hide it from the clients. When the clients show up for inspection, they show their like of the brick wall, but they're adamant on the glass instead of the corks. They are also sold on the ozone generator in the water purification system, but they are concerned with some of the health issues. Geoff is forced to think hard and consider pulling the plug on some of the projects, as only $560 is left, all of which have already been earmarked for supplies needed by the team.

Deleted Scene: The deleted scene from this episode is from Day 12, as the team contemplates on ways to raise money after Geoff admits to blowing the budget. Geoff considers selling one of the artisan pieces such as Tom's railing. Tom isn't opposed to the idea as he believes he can create a new one (though the rest of the team is reserved due to the massive steelwork still to be done), as long as the team can sell it on the right website for at least $1500; he is adamant about this as ten years ago, he was burned when the piece that took him $1500 to make sold for only $200 due to what he believed was a poor choice of website.

=== Episode 5 - Days 14-18 ===
Original airdate: April 18, 2011

Day 14 begins with most of the container structure completed, but one notable project that hasn't even started is the firefly. Geoff had put off the project for a long time, and he's forced to use the rest of his $500 for steel studs to build the firefly. As for his orders to the rest of the team, John is tasked with finding the rest of the sinks needed for the sink wall (as Gordie's chances of finding enough sinks is starting to slim), Katrina with a boardroom table, while Tom and Merv are tasked with preparing the container for installation at the brickworks. John is able to secure a barter deal for the needed sinks, but they do not have the stainless steel needed for bartering. Gordie heads to various sites around Toronto (a Toronto Works and Emergency Services storage locker and a storage space for old Toronto Santa Claus Parade floats) for the stainless steel, but unfortunately he returns with no stainless steel (though he does manage to find parts for the firefly). In a turn of events, Paul receives an offer for the bicycle chair built by Andy that will give them the cash needed to buy the sinks, but Andy refuses to give his consent to sell (despite the clients having stated their dislike for the chair). However, they may not have to sell the chair at all: they had earlier recovered two fudge machines, which contains enough stainless steel that they can trade for the sinks. Unfortunately, at the scrapyard they only have 33 of their 70 sinks, but they had managed to save four stainless steel augers that Andy had fought so hard to keep (as well as $230 in their account).

Day 15 begins with Tom and Merv heading off to the brickworks to install the support columns, as Geoff begins building the firefly. The pressure is building for Andy and Katrina, as the furniture builds are up against a time crunch. Andy starts painting the box chairs Katrina had built earlier, and gets the inspiration for a portable kitchen island from a recovered stretcher; it is fully built three hours later. Meanwhile, Katrina starts work on a boardroom table from recovered tongue-in-groove cedar. At the brickworks, Tom and Merv discover that a sprinkler pipe is impeding their container installation, meaning that they must return to the shop and cut the supports down to size.

After a late night of cutting, Tom and Merv try for a second try at the supports at the brickworks. Meanwhile, Geoff and Gordie manage to secure uncrushed cans from the brewery, which they use to get another crib wall completed (though two crib walls, including one out of the crushed auto glass that the clients want, is still to be built). As for the firefly, they have very little cladding; only 4 of the 300 square feet (28 m^{2}) of the firefly can be covered with the recovered parts. When the clients arrive early at Geoff's request, they are sold on the can wall, and a design complication on the clients' end means that the sink wall may need fewer sinks than what they had thought. However, Geoff had brought the clients in to address the firefly; he is afraid that he cannot finish the firefly on time, and he makes his concerns clear with the clients. However, this only brings Geoff's time management into question, as they believe rightly that Geoff had put off the firefly until it was too late.

Day 17 has Paul working on an AV system, Merv, Tom, and John on finishing touches on the container, and Andy and Katrina on the furniture. Paul heads off to an electronics recycling depot to raid what they have. One old monitor and overhead projector later, and a "poor man's projection display" is completed.

An all-nighter by the entire crew later, Paul continues his work on the door opener, still non-functional after 18 days. Geoff, however, doesn't have the money to dispose of the leftover garbage from their build (needing $500 for a garbage bin), and Geoff is pressuring Andy to sell the bike chair once again. To add to the bad news, just as the door opener is finished and properly working, they discover that the sprinkler pipe may impede the door opener. Finally, the containers are loaded onto a flatbed truck and taken to the brickworks. The build at the workshop is now complete, but the team is confident that complications may still arise in the installation...

=== Episode 6 - Day 19-22 ===
Original airdate: April 25, 2011

Day 19 begins with Andy taking charge of the sink wall and Gordie with the garbage disposal. Geoff, Tom, and Merv head off to the brickworks to hoist the containers in place, but because of the limited clearance, the door opener that took Paul so much time to build and perfect must be taken down to get the container in place. Meanwhile, many of the sinks must be cleaned by Katrina and John, as they contain a rubber soundproofing applied to the underside. Gordie's approach to the garbage is exactly according to his lifestyle: selling it in a yard sale.

Day 20 begins with Merv and Tom continuing with the container installation, Geoff and John taking the crib walls to the brickworks to be installed, all while Gordie goes to scrap the rest of their scrap metal for cash. However, they still need $30 for a garbage bin (and to avoid selling Andy's vaunted bike chair). Paul is tasked with finding the ultralight material for the firefly, while Gordie is organizing the yard sale. A late hit on the junk hotline allows Paul to get the rest of the firefly cladding they need, in the form of space blankets and LEDs. Back at the yard sale, despite a diminishing crowd, they are able to secure the garbage bin that they need, and the rest of what they cannot sell proceeds to the garbage bin. At the brickworks, while Tom works on the metal work that will secure the two container halves to each other, the rolling wall is discovered to not roll due to a buried rail track running under the wall.

Day 21 begins with everything being packed and moved to the brickworks. Merv and Tom are already at the brickworks with a head start on the welding job. Geoff and John start on the windows, Andy and Katrina on installing the sink wall, while Gordie goes on hanging the sink wall. Unfortunately, the firefly's top-heaviness does not allow it to be hung even without the cladding. The kitchen and most of the container's internal furniture are installed without a hitch, but the cork crib wall (replacing the crushed auto glass) is discovered to have been damaged during the transport, and an argument between Tom, Paul, and John over a sheet metal awning (over which a solar panel is to be mounted) causes Tom to walk off the job in disgust. The rest of the team continues to press on through the night on various tasks.

Day 22 is the final working day of the Junk Raiders experiment, and the day that the Evergreen Brick Works is open to the public for the first time. Still on the finished list is the firefly as well as some of the furniture. The team has only one hour before the clients show up for their final inspection, and because the firefly cladding is flammable, the bad news is that the firefly is doomed to fail. Furthermore, the water purification system and the projector media player are also acting up. This causes Tom to snap again with so little time until the clients arrive. The rest of the team works on finishing touches to the clubhouse.

The clients arrive with four other Brickworks executives. They are greeted with the bad news on the firefly, but the rest of the team helps everyone through the completed clubhouse, as even Matthew and Martin has not seen over half of the projects before this point. The client group is mixed over the final project, especially on the brick wall and firefly, but they ultimately unanimously decide to keep the structure (less the firefly). The Junk Raiders celebrate their success in finishing the project with $5000, of which only $60 of which was spent on things other than structural steel.
