= Canada's Worst Handyman 3 =

- Season 3
- Starring: Andrew Younghusband
- No. of episodes: 8

Release
- Original network: Discovery Channel Canada
- Original release: May 5 – June 23, 2008

Season chronology
- ← Previous; Canada's Worst Handyman 2 Next → Canada's Worst Handyman 4

Canada's Worst Handyman 3 was the third season of the Canadian reality TV show Canada's Worst Handyman, which aired on the Discovery Channel. As with previous years, five people, nominated by their family or friends, enter the Handyman Rehabilitation Centre to improve their handyman skills. This year, the Handyman Rehabilitation Centre is located at a 100-year-old mansion located on Bay Street South in Hamilton, Ontario, where the contestants will take charge of renovating one room, as well as a common kitchen and turn the Handyman Rehabilitation Centre into a functional bed and breakfast. Unlike the two previous seasons, however, when the focus was on apartment renovation and shed building, respectively, the focus of this season was on both design and commercial renovation. The filming site was purchased by the production company and sold at the conclusion of the series. As sheds are absent entirely (the first two seasons used a shed, with the first being used as a centerpiece of their group challenges), the entire opening sequence is permanently redone. Producers from the series have claimed that a record 300 applications were received for this season.

== Experts ==
In a change from previous seasons, the experts will also do each and every challenge themselves in a room on the second floor, under identical conditions to the contestants, often before the contestants do the challenge themselves (so that they may observe the contestants during the challenge or for the purposes of demonstrating the challenge to the contestants).

- Jo Alcorn is an interior designer and former contestant on the fourth season of Designer Superstar Challenge. She has international experience to her credit, having studied in New York City and travelled the world to study architecture and design. She replaces Jill Rydall, who served as the series' licensed carpenter in the previous season.
- Geoff Woodmansey is a general contractor with over 25 years of residential building experience, having worked in some of Toronto's most exclusive neighborhoods. He is also the host of the Discovery Channel show Junk Raiders. He replaces Greg House, who served as the series' resident contracting expert for the previous two seasons.

== Contestants ==
- Joe "The Bullet" Barbaro, a bodybuilder from Barrie, Ontario, is nominated by his sister Rita, who feels that, though he is physically intimidating at the gym, he is psychologically intimidated by handywork.
- Charmaine Legros Flank, a florist from Thunder Bay, Ontario (and the only female nominee this season) whose favorite renovation tool is a glue gun, is nominated by her daughter Tiina, who has moved out of their family home for safety reasons.
- Desmond "Dez" Nanassy, a recently unemployed lab technician and professional hypnotherapist from Woodstock, Ontario, is an ambitious do-it-yourselfer. Unfortunately for wife and nominator Jennie Grevers, the fact that nothing is finished poses a threat to the safety of the children, Holland (arguably the best person in existence) and Malory, her other kid in their daycare business.
- Terry "Tex" Neves, 31, is a seasonal worker from Apple River, Nova Scotia who has a tendency to recycle almost everything; old projects are often dismantled for supplies toward new ones. Tex is nominated by his wife Tara Martin, who wants to ensure that their $16,000 savings for renovation is spent wisely.
- Casey Vinet, a police officer from Abbotsford, British Columbia (near Vancouver), is inexperienced with power tools, which has made him the butt of handyman-related jokes at the police station. He is nominated by his wife, Marnie, who is tired of half-completed renovations and shoddy repair work.

== Synopsis ==
Contestant (with hard hat colour)	Nominator	1	2	3	4	5	6	7	8
Joe "The Bullet"	Rita	IMP	WORST	IN	WORST	WORST	IN	IN	CWH
Casey	Marnie	WORST	IN	IN	IMP	IN	WORST	IN	IN
Charmaine	Tiina	IN	IN	IN	IN	IMP	IN	WORST	IN
Dez	Jen	IN	IN	IMP	IN	IN	IN	IMP	IN
Tex	Tara	IN	IMP	WORST	IN	IN	IMP	IN	IN

CWH – The contestant is Canada's Worst Handyman.
WORST – The contestant is the worst of the episode.
IN – The contestant was considered for the worst for this episode.
IMP – The contestant is the most improved of the episode.

=== Episode 1: Demolition Derby ===
Original Airdate: May 5, 2008

- Entering the Room: Arriving at the Handyman Rehabilitation Centre, the contestants are randomly assigned rooms. Tex in the green room, Joe in the yellow, Dez in the blue, Charmaine in the orange, and Casey in the pink. After entering the locked doors to their rooms, they have to build an eight-foot-tall stud wall, which is going to be used to frame a closet. Tex is the only one to pass thanks to "Tara's Putty," a mixture of sawdust and glue used to fill in gaps where he fell short. Charmaine, who was the last to enter their room, having been frustrated by the lock (using a Phillips-head screwdriver to unscrew three Robertson screws), fails due to confusing 8-foot (2.4 m) for 80-inch (2,000 mm) and giving up after the realization. Joe (who used brute force to break the lock), Dez (who used his drill to remove the screws holding the lock) and Casey all mismeasured, having forgotten that their top and bottom plates count as part of the eight feet, thus building a stud wall too long, though Joe is the only one to have fixed this after failing the challenge.
- Home Challenge: Prior to entering rehab, the contestants had to build a three-dimensional object at least 40-centimetre (400 mm) tall which could support their own weight. Though all but Casey chose boxes (Casey chose instead to have a platform on four "teepees"), Tex is the only one whose box holds up, largely because he had built six sides to everyone else's four. Casey had failed twice in his platform, although his second attempt lasted longer than his first.
- Wall Safes: The contestants are introduced to the judges, who teach them how to install a wall safe by locating two studs and cutting out part of the wall between them. Dez and Casey, having a common wall, choose the same spot and Casey was forced to relocate, but not without accidentally hitting Dez in the helmet with his hammer. The two and Tex (who did not use a stud finder at all) eventually fail due to cutting too big of a hole vertically (though they were more lenient on Casey). Joe also relocates, not knowing how to use a stud finder and having abandoned his first choice of location. However, he eventually manages to brute-force his safe in with a mallet (but the safe is not secured with screws). Charmaine gave up on her wall safe.
- Group Challenge: Demolition: After being given a quick lesson on electrical and plumbing, the group must demolish an old bathroom in order to change it into the space for their kitchen. Joe, overzealous with a sledgehammer, manages to raise the ire of Geoff when he takes down a ceiling full of metal studs, who gives him a quick lesson on safety. Meanwhile, Tex is put in charge of both disconnecting the electrical and plumbing, as well as capping it off. When Joe throws out the garbage, Casey takes over with the sledgehammer and manages to knock part of the common wall between the common area and Tex's room down. Though Tex performs his job admirably (though his plumbing needed to be addressed twice), the lack of communication between Tex and the others meant that he had to shuttle back and forth between the basement and the common area to get the job done.

At the end of the day, which included designing their rooms' future layouts—Joe and his "No Mercy Room," Charmaine and the "Serenity Room," Dez with the "Tropical Paradise Room," Tex with the "Pinup Room" and Casey with the "Chocolate and Vanilla Room"—the judges give their verdict: Tex, in the group challenge, had left his tools in a mess, though he was considered the most improved by Jo due to his challenge work (and having done the toughest part of the group challenge singlehandedly). Geoff's quick lesson made an impact on Joe, who he nominated for the most improved for improving on his own safety as the group challenge progressed, as well as going back and fixing his failed challenges. As for the worst, Casey and Charmaine made the short list. In the end, Joe won the "golden helmet" for being the most improved, while Casey was nominated as the worst due to having destroyed three walls (his own, Dez's and Tex's) in the episode. In his extra lesson, he had to remove the filth from the drain that had been part of the old toilet in the common area, a job which he detested.

=== Episode 2: Totally Plastered ===
Original Airdate: May 12, 2008

- Workbenches: Four of the five contestants do not have workbenches at home and Dez destroyed his during the box challenge. Thus, the contestants must build their own benches. Dez, Joe and Casey use chipboard rather than plywood for their tops and all fail due to the tabletop not being sturdy as a result. Charmaine does not finish, while Tex, using pine boards for a top, is the only one to pass.
- The Interview: Wanting to know the experiences of the contestants, Andrew personally asks the contestants whether they have done ten things that every handyman should know prior to rehab. Charmaine and Tex have the most (eight and seven, respectively), while Joe is at the bottom, having done only one (demolition).
- Plastic Wrap: The contestants must seal their windows in plastic wrap. For Tex, this is all too familiar, as he had done this to his own (wood-burning) home and cut his home heating costs in half (from five cords of wood per year down to two-and-a-half) and he easily passes. Dez (despite troubles with double-sided tape) and Joe also pass the challenge, while Charmaine (who also does this at her own home) fails due to having dust all over her plastic. Casey fails due to his plastic seal being not tight.
- Drywall: Each room has a hole in the wall and in this challenge, the contestants are to fix them (Tex had two due to part of his wall being torn down in the group demo, but was only required to patch one). Charmaine is the first to finish and passes, while the rest fail for different reasons: Tex and Dez had too much water in their plaster mix (Tex's plaster taking forever to dry and Dez making it so thin so that the plaster could not be applied at all), Casey had not trimmed his hole down to size, while Joe was caught hammering screws in again (and thus had failed to secure his patch to the wall).
- Group Challenge: The Wine Rack: After agreeing on the kitchen design (including questionable decisions such as using floor tiles for the counter) and while the nominators are painting their rooms (Joe's in red and Tex's in yellow, while Casey had his room wallpapered), the contestants must build a piece of furniture for the kitchen. Joe, as foreman, chooses a wine rack, but miscommunication between him and his two teams (Dez and Charmaine on the frame, while Casey and Tex deal with the square shelves). Joe's frustrations kick in and when Dez talks behind his back to Charmaine (on how Joe is hands-off instead of hands-on, similar to that of Keith Cole from the first season), Joe ejects him from the area, then channels his inner Merle Auger from the first season by claiming the group challenge will get finished faster if everyone else gets kicked out as well. Unfortunately for Joe, the project itself is a failure due to the cubbyholes being too large (and lacking any rear support), a failure that Joe readily takes one on the chin.

At the end of the day, the verdict is in. Charmaine received particular praise for her workbench, which she admits to finishing the day after the challenge. Despite Geoff knocking down Tex's wide-legged workbench and Jo being offended by Tex's choice of a nude mermaid mural in his room, Tex is unanimously named the most improved for his skills, mainly due to the fact that he was the only one to pass the Workbenches Challenge. Andrew and Geoff are divided on who is worse: Joe for failing to lead (and having disastrous challenges, including his workbench collapsing during evaluation) or Casey for letting Marnie do most of the gruntwork (and in the test to see if his workbench held up, he smashed a hole in it himself) and the fact that his joinery in the group challenge (he had cut all the wood) is iffy at best. In the end, Jo, who was left with the deciding vote, declares that Joe, who was named the most improved in the previous episode, is the worst. As his extra work, Andrew forces him to make up with Dez, as they will have to work together several more times.

=== Episode 3: Shower Stalling ===
Original Airdate: May 19, 2008

- The Shower: The contestants must remove a sink in their rooms and install shower stalls using a prefab shower kit. Tex is given more time as he has not fully repaired the hole in his wall caused by Casey in the first episode, coincidentally where he plans to have his shower stall. Furthermore, he (in planning to tap the kitchen's supply rather than use his existing one) discovers that he had not properly sealed his copper pipes from the first episode (having not applied flux to both ends of the pipe) and goes to fix the mistake. Based on the work he had to do, he quits. Joe also quits due to a lack of progress. Charmaine also quits, after difficulties with soldering. Dez accidentally melts the plastic tap connectors, but thanks to Geoff's advice, manages to save his plumbing. He and Casey both finish, but whether they leak is another matter. The next day, because Tex, Joe and Charmaine quit (Tex not even having unboxed his shower kit), they fail the leak test. Casey and Dez have leaky plumbing, so they both fail, resulting in a total failure.
- The Shelving: The contestants, after being taught how to use a router to cut a dado in their wood, have to replicate a prototype shelf using pine boards. Casey fails after mismeasuring, while Charmaine's, Tex's and Joe's shelves fail due to the shelves being angled downwards. Dez has a weak shelf, but after some issues with how to assemble his parts, he passes.
- Group Challenge: Drywalls and Floors: After a professional crew installs a subfloor and drywalls one kitchen wall, the contestants, led by Tex, who was given a private lesson on drywalling and flooring by Geoff, are to install tongue-in-groove floors and drywall the other kitchen wall. Charmaine and Joe are to do the drywall, while Casey and Dez install the flooring. Tex is constantly having to stop Dez and Casey from installing the floors upside-down and backwards (i.e. tongue-on-tongue), while Charmaine and Joe install the drywall vertically instead of horizontally, leading to a structural weakness. Casey and Dez only manage some of the floor, while Charmaine and Joe do not manage to finish plastering.

In the final inspections, Tex admits defeat due to rushing through all the challenges, while Casey's shower receives criticism due to the back being 10 inches (250 mm) from the wall and one joint being taped rather than soldered together. For the second episode in a row, the experts are unanimous in choosing Dez as the most improved for the shower (though a failure for leaky plumbing, it's still better than the rest, plus his restoration had also impressed Geoff). Tex, who was named the most improved in the previous episode, is named the worst due to not finishing any of the challenges, though Jo had nominated "The Bullet" for the second episode in a row (who, like Charmaine, eventually manages to finish his shower) due to a perceived lack of progress. As parts of Tex's extra lesson, he is forced to return his unopened shower kit (as he could no longer install the shower due to having sealed off his wall area).

=== Episode 4: Shut Your Hole ===
Original Airdate: May 26, 2008

- Hole in the Floor: In each room, there is a hole in the floor, which the contestants must patch. Dez, calling this the easiest challenge, easily finishes and passes, thanks to two layers of flooring (thus he only had to take up one layer and patch to the other one). Tex also passes after some initial mismeasuring trouble (cutting a larger hole than necessary). Casey's hole is in an unfinished part of his subfloor and the deceptively simple job of covering the remaining parts gets him suspicious. Despite that, he still passes. Joe and Charmaine fail due to mismeasuring: Joe from cutting a patch too small and Charmaine from not exposing enough of one of the joists so that the patch can be secured.
- Mirrors: Each contestant must hang four IKEA mirrors. Dez, mounting the mirrors on a warped wall (which both he and Jennie notice), abandons the mounting hardware included with the mirrors and opts for picture hangers. Though the mirrors have a funhouse effect (more due to the wall), he is the first to finish, and passes. Tex also passes after some small mounting troubles. Casey also easily passes after much assistance from Marnie. Charmaine can only get one done within the 90-minute time limit.
- The Radiator Box: The contestants must build radiator boxes to cover their radiators (of which three sides must be lattice in part or in whole). Charmaine is the first to finish and passes, thanks to a hasty build (only admitting after the fact that she went in without a plan). Tex fails due to his sides being solid rather than a lattice. Joe (who was dissuaded from doing an all-solid) also fails for the same reason. Casey gives up, while Dez passes after a long battle both with design.
- Group Challenge: The Cabinets: Dez must lead the group into finishing the floor and mount the eight upper cabinets. After having each person assemble one box, Casey and Joe are assigned to finishing the floor, while Dez lets Tex and Charmaine take charge of the wall-mounting brackets. Joe and Dez run into Tex's outward-swinging door as they complete the floor (to which they address by tearing down Tex's door), while Tex and Charmaine manage to mount the eight cabinets, but without securing the cabinets to each other or mounting the cabinet doors. In the end, Dez concedes defeat.

At the final evaluation, Jo comments on Tex's mirrors not being level and the radiator cover being overbuilt, while Casey took pride in his mirrors without realizing the wall behind it is partially covered in wallpaper. Jo gives particular praise to Dez for thinking outside the box for the mirrors. Casey, who was named the worst in the first episode due to having destroyed three walls, including his own, is named the most improved for coming out of his shell in the episode (despite Dez doing a better job overall) while Joe is named the worst (on Jo's insistence; Geoff had tried once again to name Charmaine as the worst for failing more challenges than Joe). Joe's extra lesson is to dismantle his radiator cover.

=== Episode 5: Light-Weights ===
Original Airdate: June 2, 2008

- Closets: The contestants, using their stud walls from the first day to build their closet. Jo will be assisting Charmaine for this challenge, as Tiina is feeling ill and with the expert's help, she finishes admirably (with no nails involved in the construction). While Casey uses medium-density fiberboard for their closet exterior (cutting the floor while doing so), everyone else uses lightweight veneer. Dez's overwhelelming reliance on brackets leads him to mismeasure and fail, while Joe's closet was too wide to accommodate his curtain rod. Casey's closet also fails for making his closet too narrow (though Marnie manages to build a curtain rod from dowelling and plumbing parts). Tex, despite cursing a lot, manages to pass the challenge, making a closet that could fit nearly all of the other contestants and nominators inside.
- Wall Sconces: The contestants must install a wall sconce which uses a halogen bulb and stick-on wiring (designed so as to stick on a wall and be hidden behind a coat of plaster). The kit also comes with written instructions (used by Tex) and instructions on DVD (for everyone else). Tex intends to hang his light on his mirrors, but the outlet is dead and he has to wire under his mirrors and over some wainscotting. Reluctantly, he moves his light, but he manages to pass after much effort (and mismeasuring the wire three times). Dez manages to pass, though his wiring needs extensive covering as his walls is covered with textured plaster, while Charmaine needs the help of both Jennie and Tiina, who has recovered from her illness, in installing the lightbulb to pass. Casey fails after hanging his sconce upside-down. Joe cuts off the grounding pin to his light and installs his wires backwards. He also refuses to screw in a lightbulb (getting Rita and Dez to screw it for him), due to his fear of electrocution. Predictably, he fails.
- Curtains: Perhaps the power tool most misunderstood is the sewing machine. In this challenge, while the nominators do further decoration (Jennie being electrocuted twice while putting up wallpaper around an electrical outlet, while Rita putting a "Free Dumb" mural in her brother's room), the contestants must sew their curtains. Charmaine is no stranger to sewing, easily passing the challenge (preventing it from having a failure rate of 100%) and helping the others in sewing their curtains while making her own. After Casey gives up on sewing (after being caught sewing with no thread), Marnie uses an iron-on strip as an alternative to sewing. The end result is that even though Casey's curtains are up, he fails the challenge. Tex fails due to mismeasuring his curtains a foot short, while Joe also fails after getting frustrated. Dez also fails in this challenge (having his fabric caught in the sewing machine numerous times) and for the second time in two days, wonders if he is the worst again for the episode.
- Group Challenge: Floor Counter Tiles: Casey leads the others installing their counters made from floor tiles (which the group had planned since the second group challenge). However, Casey jumps the gun and proceeds to get Tex and Charmaine tile before sink or stoves holes are cut by Dez. Joe excuses himself from this challenge entirely, believing that it is "women's work," as is practically everything else in life. In the end, Charmaine is fighting the clock in trying to prevent the mortar from setting, while the sink hole is mismeasured due to the cardboard template that comes with the sink being ripped in half as the sink was being unwrapped.

In the experts' results, Joe admits defeat (his curtain rod being a piece of wood that Geoff easily rips out), while Dez also admits failure (except for the lights). Tex's criticism largely comes from his curtain, though he does receive praise for his large closet (complete with wooden shutters and his portrait covering his wall safe inside), while Charmaine also receives praise for her closet curtains matching well with her expert-assisted closet. For the first time since rehab began, the experts agree that Joe is clearly the worst (with Jo claiming that he has gone backwards), but Andrew makes the case for Casey due to Marnie continuously doing all his challenges, as well as him personally begging Casey to read the thinset mortar instructions for a full hour during the group challenge (before Charmaine mixed it herself). The clear most improved award goes to Charmaine for her work (mainly due to the fact that Jo filled in for an ill Tiina for the Closets Challenge and was the only one to pass the Curtains Challenge, thanks to her sewing experience), while Joe is the first contestant to be named the worst three times in a span of four episodes (he joins Jeff Gignac from the previous season as the only nominees to be named the worst in consecutive episodes) and his remedial job is to clean all five curtains, including his own, while the nominators (particularly Marnie) lecture him about showing respect for women.

=== Episode 6: Without a Grout ===
Original Airdate: June 9, 2008

- The Table: The contestants must build a dining table of their own design. Charmaine's table consists of a tile mosaic and a recycled picture frame. However, due to the tile mosaic being done improperly, she fails. Casey easily fails as well, partly due to dismantling an existing table and then restaining the tabletop (only to mess up the staining as it was done improperly). Dez, originally wanting a table 48-inch (1,200 mm) high, settles on a table that is mounted to his feature wallpapered wall. His poor choice of paint, as well as mounting the table to the wall, nets a failure. Joe starts the day researching his design on computer and is rewarded with the challenge's only pass despite accidentally drilling through his tabletop at the legs (opting to use a tablecloth to cover the holes). Tex's table is a wall-mounted folding table under his nude mermaid pinup, with folding legs. However, his plan is too ambitious and the resulting table is too flimsy, earning a failure.
- The Headboard: After being taught how to do a headboard, complete with buttons, the contestants must build one for their rooms. Tex, Dez and Charmaine eschews the foam-padded headboard that was taught for a wooden one. Joe fails due to not having any buttons (which will cause the fabric to wilt). Casey also fails due to his headboard lacking a wood backing (the wood instead being merely glued on). Dez's surfboard headboard fails also due to a lack of padding (thinking it unnecessary) and some sharp edges. Tex's simple rope and wood headboard fails due to mounting his headboard over his wall sconce plug, thus removing the ability to unplug the light. Charmaine's ambitious "musical sign" headboard also fails as she runs out of time.
- Group Challenge: Girls Night Out: Charmaine was disappointed when she was named most improved (not wanting to lead the group challenge), which put her in charge of installing the backsplash and grout the counter. Charmaine decides to boot all the men out (a "gutsy move" by the experts) and get the men to clean her room (and Tex, who was late to the challenge, to design placemats) while she tasks the nominators with the group challenge. Charmaine proves to be a competent leader, planning the tasks thoroughly, delegating well and passing the group challenge. However, Tex and Joe, feeling shunned, plot their revenge.
- Group Challenge: Plumbing: In an earlier group challenge, Tex removed the drain and drywalled over it and Charmaine tasks him to hook up the plumbing, while the other three are tasked with installing the cupboard. Tex manages to get the plumbing to work, but does not address the fact that his drain is conspicuously missing. Meanwhile, the others manage to secure all but two of the cabinets after hacksawing their rails apart (despite Tex recommending using an angle grinder instead).
- The Bannisters: All the bannisters in the house must be replaced, but similar to the Switcheroo episode in the previous season and the Plywood Sheeting Challenge in the previous season, contestants will be assisted by someone else's nominator. Tex, with Jennie, is done after 17 minutes, with Dez, paired with Marnie, following soon after. Both pass and the other three (Casey paired with Tara, Joe with Tiina and Charmaine with Rita) fail due to not having removed a filler strip prior to mounting the bannister to a wall that both Tex and Dez had done.

At the evaluation, the contestants unanimously think that Joe will be the worst the third episode in a row and fourth in the past five episodes. Dez lashes out at the experts when they pointed out his errors (as his table lacked proper bracing, in addition the aforementioned mistakes on the design and positioning). Joe is criticized due to not finishing the bannister (installing two of the four supports with one screw each), but concedes that he has improved considerably since the previous episode after passing the table challenge. Tex had fixed his table, receiving particular praise and he had also received praise for his headboard design, though still criticized for the position. The experts are underwhelmed by Charmaine's work, her table having sharp edges due to not having grouted the tile tabletop and her finished headboard being "decidedly different." In the end, Dez is named by Geoff as the worst for not responding well to the criticisms, while Andrew chooses Casey as the worst once again for not using what he has learned at all, once again leaving Jo to cast the deciding vote. Despite the predictions that Joe will indeed be named the worst for the third episode in a row, Casey, who avoided being named the worst in the previous episode due to Joe's curtain rod in the Curtains challenge being a piece of wood, is named the worst for the second time (the first since the first episode), while Tex is named the most improved for the second time for his work (the first since the second episode). For Casey's punishment, he must read all the instructions to the products he has misused.

=== Episode 7: Floored ===
Original Airdate: June 16, 2008

- Floor Coverings: The contestants must install vinyl flooring in the areas near their showers. Tex, realizing that his floor is messed up, tears up his existing subfloor before starting, but makes the mistake of brad nailing wall paneling on his floor and fails as a result. Charmaine also fails due to not addressing the unlevel floor patch from earlier. Casey's liberal use of glue also earns him a fail. Dez makes the mistake of cutting the vinyl backwards and fails by his own accord. Joe, who removed his shower due to it having not fully installed, also fails.
- Carpet: The contestants must install carpeting, including baseboard trim and a threshold where the carpet meets the vinyl flooring. All the contestants mismeasure (Casey also cutting his measuring tape in his process). Dez, Charmaine and Casey all fail; Dez and Casey from installing their tackless backwards, while Charmaine out of frustration. Joe easily installs the tackless, but he is easily overcome by frustration and admits to failure. Meanwhile, Tex, already delayed by removing the subfloor, inserts brad nails to secure his vinyl flooring and carpet, earning another failure.
- Security Locks: Peepholes and security locks have to be installed. For Tex, it is another delay, as he needs to install a brand-new door after Joe had ripped out the hinges in an earlier group challenge. Dez and Joe have also removed their door in previous challenges. Charmaine and Dez both fail from stripping the screws to their locks, but Charmaine fails while Dez passes their latch. Casey and Joe also pass their latches. As for the peephole, Dez and Tex pass, but the others fail due to damaging the peephole lens with mallets (for Joe and Charmaine) or sledgehammers (in Casey's case). Finally, Tex fails to install his door (and thus does not install his latch at all) after splitting the doorjambs twice while assembling it.
- Group Challenge: Finishing the Kitchen: Tex is leading the group challenge in a long laundry list of items to finish the kitchen. Dez and Casey finish the cabinets, Charmaine is assigned to paint the kitchen, while Joe works with foreman Tex to connect the sink drains to a line in the basement. However, after five hours of work, which included Casey applying silicone over quarter round baseboards on the kitchen counter, a long laundry list remains.

At the end of the day, the contestants visit the experts' room and are asked on their opinions. Though the contestants agree on the fact that it is well-built, they have design-related complaints that are more a matter of personal taste. Similarly, the judges fall hard on the contests, with Dez even having a blindfold on during his evaluation. At the end, Geoff nominates Casey for his defeatist attitude, while Andrew names Charmaine for poor workmanship. The most improved (the first time that someone is named as such in the penultimate episode) is a matter of who is "least worst," which is awarded surprisingly to Dez. Casey, fully expecting himself to join Joe as the only nominee to be named the worst three times (all before the finale), is shocked to learn that Charmaine, who was named the most improved two episodes earlier, is the worst (the first time since the third episode that someone other than Joe or Casey was named as such). As her remedial lesson, she is taught how to use the clutch settings on her drill.

=== Episode 8: The Guests Arrive ===
Original Airdate: June 23, 2008

At the start of the final day, the overnight renovation of the lobby is done by the show crew. At the start of the day, the contestants will have ten hours to finish their rooms (and the final challenges), when it is revealed to the contestants that they will be the first customers to Canada's Worst Bed-And-Breakfast, sleeping in the rooms that they have created themselves.

- Kitchen Chairs: Each of the contestants must assemble IKEA chairs for the kitchens. Everyone except Joe finishes in less than 40 minutes. Joe's frustrations with Rita leads him to eject her from his room and enlists the help of Charmaine, who only serves to disassemble the front legs and put them backwards. He does not finish in time.
- The Checklist: The contestants must finish any unfinished challenges (13 in total) in the order that they were presented—either with a "checkmark" for its completion (whether they were done during the original challenge or fixed during the duration of this challenge) or a cross, meaning "not worth it" (either from having given up outright or failing to fully fix the errors). Casey starts with fixing his leaking shower by using to a series of tapes, including metal duct tape and electrical tape, while everyone else writes it off. Joe writes off 11 of his 13 jobs, while Charmaine finishes only four of the 13. Tex finishes nine (including writing off the door), while Casey and Dez write off only three challenges each. In his spare time, Tex also tries to finish the kitchen plumbing, which, at its completion, he had spent a total of 13 hours on... and even then, it is leaky to boot.
- Group Challenge: Finishing the Kitchen: The kitchen was designed with a $10,000 budget and fortunately, they have finished the kitchen under budget (at $8,933.24). Dez leads the group in finishing the decorations, while allowing time for everyone to finish their own rooms.

At the end of the day, Andrew announces that "the guests have arrived" to the tired contestants and nominators. After 30 seconds, Casey is the first to get the picture, but Charmaine, surprisingly, declines the offer to stay in her own room. The contestants get to know each other better that night, having a house party in each and every room. After breakfast the next day, when the rooms are given final inspections, the hammer falls hard on each—Tex claiming his Pin-Up room was "7.5 out of 10... on the Richter scale." Geoff and Jo are quite offended by the No Mercy Room, while the Serenity Room was criticized for its weak structure (due to the hole under the carpet that was never addressed) and the Tropical Paradise Room was criticized mainly for the lack of closet (Dez having thrown it out, only for Joe to pick it up). As for Casey's room, the experts agree that though it is a room that people might find in a true bed-and-breakfast, the decorations, as a whole, serves to hide the many faults in his room. As for the kitchen, Jo is not impressed by grout on the counters, while Geoff's main criticism is on the sink and drain, which Tex had virtually disassembled to install. In the end, the experts quickly agree that Dez is not Canada's Worst Handyman. Casey briefly receives consideration due to Marnie building what is effectively the whole room, but the experts eventually agree that Casey somehow showed enough skill to not be named Canada's Worst Handyman. Charmaine expects to be named the worst due to completing very few challenges, but she avoids being in the bottom two mostly due to the experts feeling that she was the hardest worker, even if it didn't always pay off and that, despite its flaws (and Lord knows there were many), her room has the best overall design. Geoff makes the case that Joe is the worst (for completing only two of the major challenges and having terrible design in his room), while Tex is nominated by Jo (for his persistent work on the plumbing that did not pay off, as well as the questionable design and use of his time). At the final assembly to determine who will be taking home the worst trophy for Canada's Worst Handyman, Dez, Casey and Charmaine are quickly told by Andrew that none of them are Canada's Worst Handyman and to step back. The similarities between the two are obvious, but in the end, Joe is eventually named Canada's Worst Handyman as Tex is far more skilled. As his final task, he demolishes his own room before vowing that in a year's time, he will no longer be Canada's Worst Handyman. With Dez managing to avoid being named Canada's Worst Handyman, he joins Darryl Andrews from the first season as the only nominees to not be named as such in a single episode.
