= Junk Raiders =

Canadian reality television series

- Developed by: Proper Television
- Starring: Geoff Woodmansey; Gordie Wornoff; Anthony D'Arcy; Daniel Janetos; Cam Pikul; Michelle Mawby; Jean-Marc Haddad; Ross Werry; Ron Smith
- Narrated by: Craig Smith
- Country of origin: Canada
- Original language: English
- No. of episodes: 18

Production
- Executive producer: Guy O'Sullivan
- Running time: 60 minutes (including commercials)

Original release
- Network: Discovery Channel Canada (Canada); ION Television (United States)
- Release: September 14, 2009 – October 15, 2012

Junk Raiders is a Canadian reality television series that debuted in 2009 on The Discovery Channel and ION Life. The series follows the titular Junk Raiders, a team of professionals who attempt to renovate a designated space over a short period of time, and with a relatively low budget. Because of the extremely limited budgets, many of the materials needed must be found by freecycling: finding something unwanted for free and reusing it.

For the production of the series, the team had commissioned a "junk hot-line", urging Torontonians to donate any garbage that they could use. In addition, as looking through other peoples' trash is illegal in Toronto, the show also has a special exemption that allows the team to do just that.

== Seasons ==
The first season of Junk Raiders aired in 2009 and followed a seven-member team as they attempted to renovate an old steel factory in downtown Toronto and turn it into a high-end loft in one month with only a C$5500 budget.

On the second season, of 2011, the team was expanded to eight members, and the task was to renovate a site in Toronto's Don Valley (on Bayview Avenue), converting it to a two-story "clubhouse" in one month with only a C$5000 budget, as part of the Evergreen Brick Works project.

The third and final season, from 2012, had eight professionals attempting to renovate an old sports bar into a modern restaurant in one month with only a C$5000 budget.

== Team members ==
- Siamak Ashrafinia appears in the third season only. He is an Iranian-born master craftsman, who now plies his craft in Canada as a sign maker. He has many other talents, including the ability to fix almost anything. Because he is also deaf, his son, Saeed Ashrafinia, an IT specialist, is also on board as his apprentice and interpreter.
- Chuck Barnett appears in the third season only. He is resourceful, energetic, and incredibly crafty. He's the kind of guy who has never found himself needing anything that he couldn't just build himself. Online he's known as "The Cheap Bastard," starring in a ridiculously popular series of how-to videos for how to live life frugally. Chuck lives on the Kahnawake Mohawk Reservation just outside Montreal. For this season, he is also the operator of the official Junk Raiders Twitter account, @JunkRaiders.
- Andy Berry appears in the second season only as the team's designer. He has designed residences, commercial spaces, and film sets. His ideals match that of the show, as his specialty is sourcing materials from junkyards and making them look pristine.
- Anthony D'Arcy appears in the first season only. He is a real estate agent by day and freecycler by night. He is into freecycling largely because of his desire to avoid paying for anything. He is an accomplished amateur renovator, having used the freecycling philosophy to renovate his whole house.
- Lara Finley appears in the third season only. She is a high-end furniture builder who got into the trades when she accidentally ended up taking "construction technology" in high school. She then continued her studies at Sheridan College (SOCAD) taking the Furniture Design Program, and is now the president of Her Rough Hands Inc. specializing in fine furniture and custom millwork.
- Paul Graham appears in the second season only as the team's tech expert. The president of OpenLuna, an organization that seeks to get folks on the moon, he is also the builder behind "Beer-bot", a beverage-dispensing robot that keeps beer out of children's hands.
- Jean-Marc Haddad appears in the first season only as the team's technical expert. He is the owner of an electronics store, and his Cobourg, Ontario business thrives due to the planned obsolescence that is prevalent in the industry.
- Blair Harvey appears in the third season only, and is the first member of the Junk Raiders team from Newfoundland and Labrador. He is a carpenter by trade, and well-versed in creatively reusing available resources, because, in his own words, "that's what all Newfoundlanders do".
- Daniel Janetos appears in the third season only. He is the opening Toronto-based consultant chef for The Farmhouse Tavern. Chef Dan gets into heated discussions with Geoff as he attempts to push for his kitchen standards.
- John Johnson appears in the second season only. He is an inventor whose invention, the "Scoop-It Pooper Scooper", helped him pay for his first home. He is working on an invention that generates electricity from food scraps which he envisions could power large cities.
- Merv Lane appears in the second season only. He has spent 25 years in the steel trades, having helped build some of the largest steel structures in North America.
- Michelle Mawby appears in the first and third seasons as the team's interior designer. In her world, she rips out perfectly good interiors for perfectly new interiors. It's a business that she admits is wasteful, but she does little to combat the trend. As the series progresses, she becomes more committed to the reuse of materials.
- Tom Mourgas, a Greek blacksmith, appears in the second season only. He lives an old-fashioned lifestyle, from his way of life, not owning a computer or cell phone, to his way of plying his craft.
- Cam Pikul appears in the first season only as the team's builder. He has built and renovated many restaurants in and around Toronto, and he cares little for garbage—as long as his projects are on budget and are of high quality, waste is not an issue.
- Al Swanky appears in the third season only. He is a furniture upholsterer, who found his passion for upholstery after deciding to sew leather costumes for his metal band.
- Katrina Tompkins appears in the second season only. She is a Sheridan college graduate from 2009 from the Crafts and Design: Furniture Program.
- Ross Werry appears in the first season only as the team's labourer. The only member of the team not from Ontario, he plies his trade as a garbage collector at Fish Creek Provincial Park in Calgary. His skills in collecting garbage is second to none, and he joins the team to take something out of the garbage instead of hauling it away.
- Geoff Woodmansey appears in all three seasons as the team's general contractor, and is credited as the host of the series. He has been in the trades for over 25 years, working in some of Toronto's most exclusive neighborhoods. Making waste is not an issue for him—in the previous year he estimated that he threw out 135 tons of garbage—and that doesn't include the garbage from Canada's Worst Handyman 3, 4 and 5, where he was one of the experts. Besides from his work on this show and on Canada's Worst Handyman, he spends his time renovating homes in some of Toronto's most exclusive
- Gordie Wornoff, also appearing in all three seasons, is a pro salvager and a carpenter by trade. To him, freecycling is a way of life: he freecycles because others waste. He also is a freegan, finding and eating good food that has been disposed. He is skilled in carpentry, having built his house from repurposed wood.

In the first season, the team must also answer to Ron Smith, the landlord of their building site. At the end of each episode, Ron arrives and has a face-to-face meeting with Geoff and Geoff alone, and, as the client, may order the removal of anything that does not meet his standards, up to and including stopping the freecycling experiment entirely. In the second season, the client is Evergreen, a nonprofit organization in charge of the Brick Works project, a massive restoration project eight years in the making. Representing them is Martin Leifhebber, their architect, and Matthew Cohen, their senior project manager. In the third season, the client is Darcy MacDonnell, the general manager of some of the fanciest restaurants in Toronto. In addition to the incredible pressure of finishing the renovation to his standards, he also wants the restaurant to be ready for opening night, and wants his new restaurant's first impression to be a good one.

== See also ==
- Canada's Worst Handyman from the same production company
