= Canada's Worst Handyman =

Canadian television series

- Season one logo
- Developed by: Proper Television
- Written by: Andrew Younghusband
- Presented by: Andrew Younghusband
- Country of origin: Canada
- Original language: English
- No. of seasons: 6
- No. of episodes: 45

Production
- Executive producer: Guy O'Sullivan
- Running time: 60 minutes (including commercials)

Original release
- Network: Discovery Channel Canada
- Release: March 13, 2006 – June 13, 2011

Related
- Canada's Worst Driver; Blood, Sweat & Tools

Canada's Worst Handyman is a Canadian television series that aired on Discovery Channel Canada from March 13, 2006 to June 13, 2011. Based on a one-off 2004 episode of Britain's Worst DIYer, the show was produced by Proper Television, whose president, Guy O'Sullivan, was the director of the original Britain's Worst Driver series until its 2003 cancellation and shared its production with Canada's Worst Driver, including executive producer and host Andrew Younghusband. Like sister series Canada's Worst Driver, there have been similar adaptations in other English-speaking countries, in the United States in 2011, with America's 10 Worst DIYers and in Britain with a Britain's Worst 2005 spin-off series, Britain's Worst DIYer. Six seasons of the show have been completed. Throughout the show's five years on air, Younghusband remained in his role of being the only host of Canada's Worst Handyman and, like with Canada's Worst Driver, has appeared in every season. On January 10, 2013, the series' Facebook page posted a statement that the show is "on hiatus with an unknown date for relaunch." In June 2014, Discovery Channel Canada started canvassing for couples at www.badhandyman.ca. The new version of the show aired in 2015 under the title Blood, Sweat & Tools, featuring couples instead of individual handymen.

== Format ==
In each season, typically five contestants and their nominators arrive at the Handyman Rehabilitation Centre, where they partake in a two-to-three-week (16 filming days over 18 days) renovation project there, consisting of challenges that are designed to improve the contestants' handyman skills in an effort to not be named Canada's Worst Handyman. Each contestant and nominator pair are assigned colour-coded workplaces and otherwise work separately on their respective projects. Prior to entering the Handyman Rehabilitation Centre, each contestant performs a challenge in their own home, to be aired in the first episode; this is colloquially referred to as the "home challenge."

Since season one, each challenge is judged on a pass/fail system, based on whether challenges are completed within the allotted time limit (typically two to three times the time needed for a professional to perform the challenge). Nominators are expected to assist their nominees (though, as of season five, they are unable to directly offer suggestions as to the proper course of actions, so as to not take charge of the challenge themselves) and contestants may freely help each other upon the completion of their challenges. Contestants may also revisit a previous challenge on their own time if they had failed the challenge or was otherwise incomplete. Each episode also contains a group challenge where the five contestants, typically without their nominators, must perform a challenge together. Starting with the second group challenge, one contestant is deemed the foreman and is given the task of leading the other four. The foreman concept was instituted starting with the second group challenge in the first season in response to how badly the contestants worked together for the first Group Challenge (in which they had to shingle the toolshed) and it has stayed with the series since.

At the end of each episode, two experts (there were three in season one) inspect the contestants' worksites and, after each contestant is interviewed, deliberate with Andrew on which contestant improved the most and which contestant was the worst. The contestant named the most improved is given the "golden hard hat" (a tool belt was given in the first two seasons) and rewarded with the privilege of being foreman of the next episode's Group Challenge, while the contestant named the worst (who may also be the most improved contestant, as was the case with Terry Cress in season two, Johnnie Bachusky in season four and Dan Lafleur in season six; both Terry and Johnnie were ultimately named the worst in their respective seasons) is asked to "hang their head in shame," nail their portrait to a "wall of shame" and be subjected to a private "homework challenge" with Andrew.

The experts reserve the right to not name the most improved handyman or to name more than one contestant as the worst, though the former has never occurred and the latter only once (season four; Angie Budgell and Brian Pugh were named joint-worst in that season's third episode; Brian P. would become the first (and, as of 2011, only) nominee in any Worst Handyman series to ever be expelled from rehab for making a threatening statement to Brian Macdonald (known as Brian M. until the sixth episode, in which he was credited as simply "Brian") following the fourth episode's Group Challenge). On rare occasions, nominators may also be awarded the most improved or the worst for helping or hindering their nominees, respectively, though the former has occurred twice (seasons one and two; both David Hawe and Harvey Houle were named as such in the fourth episode of their respective seasons, although Harvey had to leave the latter series due to persistent back pain, but recovered enough to return for the final episode to deliver the second of Terry's two packages to the Lange family in Caledon, Ontario) and the latter only once (season five; Matt Hanley was named the worst in that season's fifth episode). On one occasion, the contestant and their nominator were collectively the most improved and worst (season two; Jaime García and Sheilla Stengler were named joint-most improved in that season's sixth episode, while Candace Landmark and her husband, Justin, were named joint-worst).

Throughout the entire process, the experts teach the contestants the various skills they may need in order to perform the challenge in classroom sessions. Starting in the third season, the experts also perform each and every challenge themselves before the contestants are given the challenges, partly as a demonstration to the contestants and partly to show that the tasks can be done correctly and within the time limit, similar to that of Canada's Worst Driver. During the challenge, the experts observe each contestant from the show's production facilities or, in later seasons, the "expert room." The experts may also intervene in the event of a gross safety violation or other serious incident or if a contestant is otherwise unprepared for the challenge (such as prerequisite challenges not being close to completion).

The final episode of each season differs in many details, but is centered on a list of tasks that all contestants must finish. For the first season, this was the "handyman final exam," where contestants must work together to fully renovate an apartment in an extended group challenge. For the second season, the list was used in a group challenge where the contestants and nominators as a whole must finish every shed, with the final challenge being moving their sheds out of their workshop, while in subsequent seasons, each contestant is given their own lists for the tasks that they must finish in their workspaces so as to make their rooms presentable; furthermore, the list must be completed in the order stated therein, typically corresponding to the order in which the challenges were originally presented. At the end of the series, the contestant with the worst finished product, as determined by Andrew and the experts, is named Canada's Worst Handyman and awarded a trophy.

== Experts ==
Experts	Season					
Experts	1	2	3	4	5	6
Geoff Woodmansey						
Gail Prosser-Craig						
Jo Alcorn						
Jill Rydall						
Dr. Julie V. Hill						
Robin Lockhart						
Greg House						

== Tools ==
In the first three seasons, the contestants were given the tools and materials needed for each challenge, with most being of the DeWalt brand. Canadian Tire became the series' primary sponsor for seasons four-five and the first challenge in both seasons was to visit a Canadian Tire store near the rehab centre where all the required tools and materials needed in rehab were purchased; as such, Mastercraft products are prominently featured. Canadian Tire withdrew their sponsorship in season six and as a result, the shopping challenge was eliminated and contestants' tools were returned to being from multiple different brands. The show has not given any indication as to whether the contestants are given the tools as a keepsake or the tools are returned to the show's production staff following each season. Furnishings for the rooms in the first three seasons included decor from IKEA.

== Nominations ==
Like its sister series, the contestants are chosen by nominations submitted to Proper Television. Canada's Worst Driver and Canada's Worst Handyman are filmed alternately, with each season of Driver followed by a season of Handyman (except for the first season, in which Handyman was filmed during the summer and Driver was filmed during the winter, Driver has been filmed during the summer and Handyman was filmed during the winter). Nominations for the next season of one are accepted shortly before the airing of a season of the other on Discovery Channel. Candidates may be nominated by multiple nominators, though like its sister series, only one nominator accompanies the contestant to the Handyman Rehabilitation Centre.

== Home Video/Internet Availability ==
Like its sister series, all six seasons are available for download in Canada from the iTunes Store in anamorphic widescreen standard definition (480i/480p), with seasons 5-6 also being available for streaming on DiscoveryChannel.ca. As of 2023 the series is no longer available on iTunes, although if you already purchased the seasons, you can still view them. Seasons 2-6 are available for streaming on CraveTV. Seasons 3-4 are available in some countries such as the UK and Sweden through streaming service Netflix. There has been no news on whether the series will be released on DVD/Blu-ray.

== Seasons ==
Season	Originally aired		Worst Handyman	Runner(s)-up
Season	First aired	Last aired	Worst Handyman	Runner(s)-up
1	March 13, 2006	April 24, 2006	Keith Cole	Darryl Andrews
2	April 16, 2007	June 11, 2007	Terry Cress	Ruth Summersides
3	May 5, 2008	June 23, 2008	Joe "The Bullet" Barbaro	Terry "Tex" Neves
4	May 4, 2009	June 15, 2009	Johnnie Bachusky	Brian Macdonald
5	May 3, 2010	June 14, 2010	Deen Flett	Simon Larade
6	May 2, 2011	June 13, 2011	Charlene Hunt	Ajay Pal Singh

=== Season 1 (2006) ===
Season 1's theme was apartment renovation.

Keith Cole was the first person named Canada's Worst Handyman due to his lack of focus. This is the only season filmed in the summer; all subsequent seasons have been filmed during the winter. This is also the first instance of a nominator being named the most improved, as David Hawe was named as such for doing The Kitchen Sink, Wallpapering and Hanging a Door Challenges correctly.

=== Season 2 (2007) ===
Season 2's theme was shed building.

Terry Cress was named Canada's Worst Handyman due to his poor attitude and work ethic, demonstrated when he not only tore apart his eco-shed with a chainsaw in order to remove the shed from the warehouse, but also visibly enjoyed this process (which was considered by the experts to be evidence of a lack of pride in his workmanship). This season saw the first instance of a nominator being replaced (Angie Cress served as Terry Cress' nominator after his original nominator, Harvey Houle, was unable to continue for medical reasons). This season also featured the first-ever instance of a contestant being named the worst in consecutive episodes, as Jeff Gignac refused help from others when needed and made too many mistakes in the Building a Doghouse Group Challenge. This season also featured the first instance of a contestant being named both the most improved and the worst in the same episode, as Terry did more things correctly, despite the usual husband-wife interactions causing trouble, but chose not to finish unfinished work. This season also featured the only instance of a contestant-nominator to be named joint-most improved, as Jaime García and Sheilla Stengler were named as such as, despite the usual mother-in-law-son-in-law interactions causing trouble during both The Entertainment Unit and Television Challenges, the fact that they completed the Cork Floor Challenge correctly. This season also featured the only instance of a contestant-nominator to be named joint-worst, as Candace Landmark and her husband, Justin, were named as such due to Justin's continual butting-in and Candace's often-futile attempts to take charge, resulting in Justin doing much of the work (although as it turns out, at the time of filming, Candace was three months pregnant with their second child, which explains the real reason why Justin had been doing much of the work). This season saw the only instance of two female nominees (every other season had only one).

=== Season 3 (2008) ===
Season 3's theme was design and commercial renovation.

Joe "The Bullet" Barbaro was named Canada's Worst Handyman for his poor design and workmanship in his room and for his perceived lack of progress. This season saw the first time the experts completed each and every challenge themselves in a room on the second floor under identical conditions to the contestants.

=== Season 4 (2009) ===
Season 4's theme was working outdoors in the cold winter.

Johnnie Bachusky was named Canada's Worst Handyman for his slow progress. This season saw the first-ever expulsion in any Worst Handyman series when Brian Pugh was removed for behaviour reasons (it was later implied that he threatened Brian Macdonald following the Three Doors Group Challenge). This season also saw the first (and only) instance in which two contestants were named the worst in the same episode, as Brian Pugh and Angie Budgell were named as such for leading the team to the ground in the Window Group Challenge and for not passing a single challenge, respectively. This season also featured the second instance of a contestant being named both the most improved and the worst in the same episode, as Johnnie did learn the most during the Plumbing Challenge, but also did the most damage to his bathroom.

=== Season 5 (2010) ===
Season 5's theme was renovation of a central kitchen.

Deen Flett was named Canada's Worst Handyman due to his unsafe work, becoming the first person to have been named as such without having been the worst in any given episode. This season saw the second instance of a nominator being replaced (Joey Larade served as Simon Larade's nominator after his original nominator, Linda Larade, was unable to continue due to other commitments). This season also saw the only instance of a nominator being named the worst, as Matt Hanley was named as such for his constant negativity, pessimism and lack of support of his wife, Angela Finseth, to the point he wants her to fail at everything.

=== Season 6 (2011) ===
Season 6's theme was transforming a common area into a spa.

Charlene Hunt was named Canada's Worst Handyman due to her slow craftsmanship, becoming the first (and only) woman to be named as such. This season featured the third instance of a contestant being named both the most improved and the worst in the same episode, as Dan Lafleur's failure to read the instructions led to him being named as such, even though the other nominees (barring only Ajay Pal Singh) voted him the most improved.

== Spinoffs ==
Junk Raiders

Junk Raiders was a spinoff series starring veteran contractor Geoff Woodmansey which used construction junk and castoffs to produce quality construction.

Blood, Sweat & Tools

In June 2014, Discovery Channel Canada started canvassing for couples for a new season at www.badhandyman.ca, using clips from past seasons. This became Blood, Sweat & Tools, a 2015 revamp of Canada's Worst Handyman starring Helder Brum, Rob Koci, and Hillary Manion, who also served as challenge judges and expert advisers to the contestants that featured handymen couples instead of individual handymen, proceeding on DIY challenges.

== See also ==
- Handyman Superstar Challenge
- Junk Raiders
