= Guy O'Sullivan =

Canadian TV producer

- Born: 1967
- Died: April 8, 2017 (aged 49)
- Occupation(s): Producer, director
- Known for: Canada's Worst Driver, Canada's Worst Handyman

Guy O'Sullivan (1967 - April 8, 2017) was a British-born Canadian television producer, and the founder and president of Canadian television company Proper Television.

O'Sullivan was born in the United Kingdom and served as a director and producer for the BBC. After moving to Canada in 2004, O'Sullivan founded Proper Television and developed Canadian versions of several popular reality television series such as MasterChef (MasterChef Canada), Storage Wars (Storage Wars Canada), Four Weddings (Four Weddings Canada) and Britain's Worst Driver (Canada's Worst Driver). He was the original director of Britain's Worst Driver in the UK.

Prior to his death in April 2017 at the age of 49, he was working on The Great Canadian Baking Show.

Throughout his career, he was nominated for the Gemini Award twice and the Canadian Screen Awards three times.
