= Junk Raiders 1 =

- Developed by: Proper Television
- Starring: Geoff Woodmansey; Gordie Wornoff; Anthony D'Arcy; Cam Pikul; Michelle Mawby; Jean-Marc Haddad; Ross Werry; Ron Smith
- Narrated by: Craig Smith
- Country of origin: Canada
- Original language: English
- No. of episodes: 6

Production
- Executive producer: Guy O'Sullivan
- Running time: 60 minutes (including commercials)

Original release
- Network: Discovery Channel Canada (Canada); ION Television (United States)
- Release: September 14 – October 19, 2009

Related
- Junk Raiders 2

The first season of Junk Raiders is Canadian reality television series that aired in 2009 on The Discovery Channel and ION Life. The series follows the titular Junk Raiders, a team of seven professionals as they attempt to renovate an old steel factory in downtown Toronto and turn it into a high-end loft in one month with only a C$5500 budget. Because of the extremely limited budget (quoted at $300,000 if done conventionally), many of the materials needed must be found by freecycling: finding something unwanted for free and reusing it.

For the production of the series, the team had commissioned a "junk hot-line", urging Torontonians to donate any garbage that they could use. In addition, as looking through other peoples' trash is illegal in Toronto, the show also has a special exemption that allows the team to do just that.

== The Team ==
The team consists of seven people, for which there are two freecyclers and five "wasters":

- Anthony D'Arcy is a real estate agent by day and freecycler by night. He is into freecycling largely because of his desire to avoid paying for anything. He is an accomplished amateur renovator, having used the freecycling philosophy to renovate his whole house.
- Jean-Marc Haddad is the team's technical expert. He is the owner of an electronics store, and his Cobourg, Ontario business thrives due to the planned obsolescence that is prevalent in the industry.
- Michelle Mawby is the team's interior designer. In her world, she rips out perfectly good interiors for perfectly new interiors. It's a business that she admits is wasteful, and she does what she can to combat the trend. Her preference is to renovate rather than demolish.
- Cam Pikul is the team's builder. He has built and renovated many restaurants in and around Toronto, and he cares little for garbage—as long as his projects are on budget and are of high quality, waste is not an issue.
- Gordie Wornoff is a pro salvager and a carpenter by trade. To him, freecycling is a way of life: he freecycles because others waste. He also is a freegan, finding and eating good food that has been disposed.
- Ross Werry is the team's labourer. The only member of the team not from Ontario, he plies his trade as a garbage collector at Fish Creek Provincial Park in Calgary. His skills in collecting garbage is second to none, and he joins the team to take something out of the garbage instead of hauling it away.
- Geoff Woodmansey is the team's general contractor, and is credited as the host of the series. He has been in the trades for over 25 years, working in some of Toronto's most exclusive neighborhoods. Making waste is not an issue for him—in the previous year he estimated that he threw out 135 tons of garbage—and that doesn't include the garbage from Canada's Worst Handyman 3, 4 and 5, where he was one of the experts.

The team must also answer to Ron Smith, the landlord of their building site. At the end of each episode, Ron arrives and has a face-to-face meeting with Geoff and Geoff alone, and, as the client, may order the removal of anything that does not meet his standards, up to and including stopping the freecycling experiment entirely.

== Synopsis ==
- Episode 1 – Days 1–3 (September 14) – Geoff introduces the team to their worksite and their budgetary constraints, and Ron reveals the plan to build a "high tech loft" out of the space. After the whole team (except Geoff) visit Turtle Island Recycling in Toronto's Port Lands to find recycled wood for their framing needs, Geoff is noticeably unimpressed; very few 2x4 wood was found, and the rest had to be milled into 2x4s. A round of slim pickings by Gordie and Michelle on the second day leads Geoff to commission the junk hotline, which yields immediate results: a tip from a home which had recently torn out their bathroom has given the team the bathroom sink and tub they need, though Michelle is critical of the "baby bathing station" and the hand shower. In the end, thanks to Cam and Ross, the framing is complete, and none of the money is spent.
- Episode 2 – Days 4–6 (September 21) – The whole team (except Geoff) starts the episode by visiting a transfer station (Commissioners Street Transfer Station in Toronto's Port Lands) to raid the unwanted junk from visitors there, where they score an old dishwasher, a working microwave, and some stainless steel. A separate trip by Gordie and Cam leads them to a construction site, where they harvest their used lumber and weeping tile. However, a shortage of fasteners and drywall (being unable to find only scrap pieces and no full sheets) leads Geoff to spend $1000 on new drywall and screws (Cam agrees, as he believes that they would save on plaster compared to drywalling with their scrap pieces). Meanwhile, Michelle believes that she is being silenced in terms of design after Geoff has Gordie and Anthony design decorations made from freecycled materials behind her back (Gordie with a lamp and Anthony with a wine rack) while she and Ross go shopping, but her attitude changes for the better after the junk hotline leads Michelle, Gordie, and Jean-Marc to Saint Luke's United Church, where they recover solid oak from old church pews, a large mirror, lockers, and an old desk that they intend to repurpose as their bathroom vanity. For the bathroom tiles, Anthony and Ross grab tiles from a warehouse where Anthony has previously freecycled for tile, but due to miscommunication with Michelle (who had insisted on going with them but was held back by Geoff), they return with more than twice what they need, forcing the team to give away the excess. In the end, Ron has some reservation as to the progress, and the accumulating pile of garbage at the worksite is leading him to believe that the site is being disrespected.
- Episode 3 – Days 7–10 (September 28) – After Geoff spends another $500 on a garbage bin (now leaving them with $3500) to address Ron's concerns, a trip to an electronics recycling depot by Anthony and Jean-Marc yields nine identical computer monitors, giving Jean-Marc the idea to hang the monitors as a showpiece for the room. While Jean-Marc works on them, Geoff takes Gordie and Anthony to task for not getting the junk they desperately need, being behind schedule on many fronts. This irks the two freecyclers, as the "freecycling to spec" needed for this job contrasts with the traditional method of freecycling renovation (freecycling to hoard supplies, and starting work only after the necessary materials are found). Nevertheless, freecycling trips by the two of them nets the crew some old plumbing that the crew can reuse for their shower, most (but not all) of the kitchen cabinetry they need, as well as a bathtub that, after Geoff declares it to be unusable (due to the rusted drain and the fact that they have an existing tub), Michelle repurposes as a sofa. Because they are behind schedule, Geoff, behind the rest of the team's back, commissions a tiler to help tile the bathroom for $1200. In the end, despite being pleased with Jean-Marc's nine-monitor display, Ron is visibly concerned that the work is behind schedule, and the problem is compounded when he orders the teardown of a bedframe that Cam and Ross had taken half a day to build.
- Episode 4 – Days 11–13 (October 5) – A surprise donation of a broken-down 1978 Chrysler New Yorker luxury car nets the team $200 by selling it for scrap (now leaving them with $2500). However, the time crunch forces Geoff to send Cam and Michelle to a Habitat for Humanity reuse-it store, where they spend $675 (now $1875) on the remainder of the kitchen cupboards, as well as a fridge, stove, and sink, as well as a new microwave after finding the one they have is defective. After a friendly competition building chairs out of shopping carts recovered from the Don River by Gordie and Ross, Anthony and Ross head out for paint and surplus supplies. Ron arrives earlier than expected, but is pleased with the progress: Jean-Marc's home theater, with speakers made with weeping tile, Gordie's rolling door, Michelle's "Harenmahkeester" headboard (an prop used on The Love Guru), and the overall car theme throughout the apartment are among the highlights.
- Episode 5 – Days 14–18 (October 12) – A mistake in the budget calculations forces Geoff to admit to the team they only have $1100 left. To raise everyone's spirits, the team head to Toronto Pearson International Airport, to an old storage facility named "Fort Knox" containing the parts that could not be recycled from the old Terminal 1 when the new Terminal 1 was built. However, the team, Jean-Marc most of all, as his "high-end home theatre" consists of an old television, can't find the necessary parts they need (though they do not leave empty-handed). Even as Jean-Marc is at a loss at what to do (now lacking the budget to buy their way out of the problem), Geoff decides to push his crew harder, creating a concrete countertop when they could not freecycle one. Still, the dire situation is creating a tense working environment, especially between Geoff and the freecyclers with a growing list of needed items and slim pickings with each garbage run, to the point where Geoff tells the freecyclers that they would be "the goats" if the project fails. Desperate for needed parts, Geoff has Michelle spend $300 of what they have left to buy things they need (including $169 for a new mattress, which offends Gordie as he believed he could find one for free). The team have another competition to make light fixtures out of old lights, while Cam finishes the boardroom table from the old church pews and Jean-Marc returns to the electronics recycling depot in the hopes of finding a better TV for their home theater. To his surprise, he finds a brand-new fully functional television there. However, the news is not all good: because of another accounting gaffe, the $300 purchase was actually a $500 purchase, and, combined with the $500 to remove the dumpster bin outside, the team has less than $100 left. Geoff asks Ron for more money when he visits, but Ron adamantly refuses and leaves without seeing the progress made. Geoff tells the team the bad news, but the team is confident they can complete the project without any more money and assure Geoff they can finish on time.
- Episode 6 – Days 19–22 (October 19) – Despite the assurance that they can finish on time under budget, Geoff, at Cam's suggestions, continues to urge Ron for $1000, if only to have money to clean up the floor. Meanwhile, Michelle's frustrations with the project quality reaches a breaking point with the rest of the crew: when arguing about whether to a tile backsplash, Geoff and Michelle argue for an extended length of time, only for both to be silenced by Cam when he suggests to use the freecycled stainless steel instead. Anthony's junk runs prove fruitful, and a barter deal with a mechanic across the street from the job site allows Jean-Marc to finish his last project—an exercise bike that could also recharge laptop batteries. The budget issue is resolved when Ross suggests that Michelle should "charm" Ron for the money when Ron refuses to answer Geoff's calls; Michelle's plea nets them $500, which they spend on cleaning up the floor and finding some cheap fabrics for upholstery. In the end, all of the projects are completed; however, Ron and a group of his clients will be making the final inspection together. On the final day, the team decides to throw a party in preparation for their arrival, with catering to be provided by one of the restaurants Cam runs. Gordie, however, leaves at the last moment, returning with some freegan food that he found on one last junk run. Though the team is appalled by what Gordie had done, they admit that the food that Gordie had found, which included more expensive items such as prosciutto, was not as bad as they had imagined (it was not until after the party that Gordie reveals that the food was, in fact, not freegan; he had also swapped some of the food for new food). In the end, Ron and his guests were split on whether to order a total tearout, but they eventually decide that the loft should stay. The Junk Raiders experiment is now complete, taking roughly $5400 to build from start to finish.
