= Keg =

Small barrel, commonly used for beer

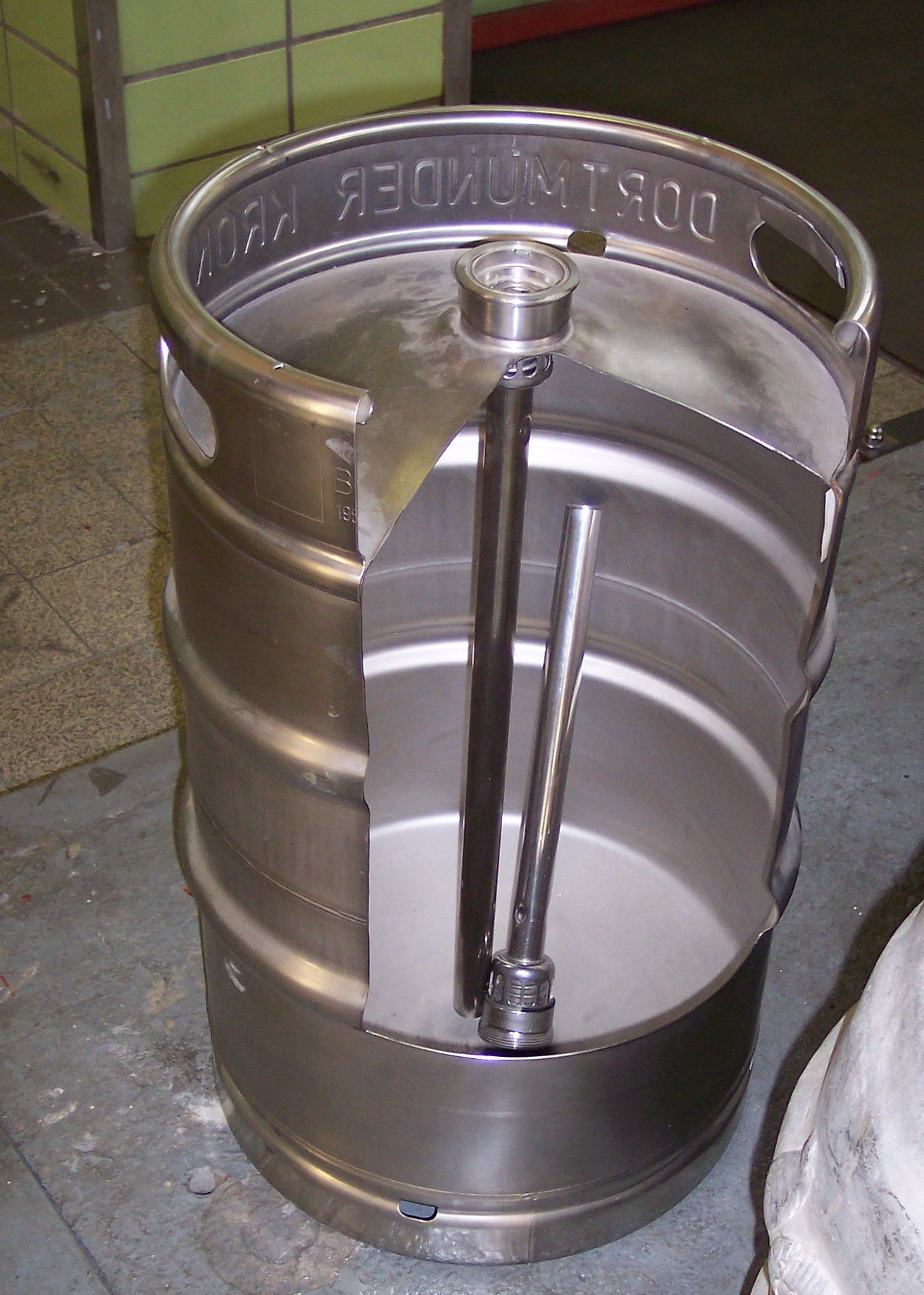
50 litre DIN keg, cutaway.

A keg is a small cask used for storing liquids. Wooden kegs made by a cooper were used to transport nails, gunpowder, and a variety of liquids. Nowadays a keg is normally constructed of stainless steel, although aluminium can be used if it is coated with plastic on the inside. It is commonly used to store, transport, and serve beer. Other alcoholic or non-alcoholic drinks, carbonated or non-carbonated, may be housed in a keg as well. Carbonated drinks are generally kept under pressure in order to maintain carbon dioxide in solution, preventing the beverage from becoming flat.

== Beer keg ==
Beer kegs are made of stainless steel, or less commonly, of aluminium. A keg has a single opening on one end, called a "bung". A tube called a "spear" extends from the opening to the other end. There is a self-closing valve that is opened by the coupling fitting which is attached when the keg is tapped. There is also an opening at the top of the spear that allows gas (usually carbon dioxide) to drive the beer out of the keg. The coupling fitting has one or two valves that control the flow of beer out of and gas into the keg. The keg must be in the upright position, that is, with the opening on top, for the beer to be dispensed. Kegs can be contrasted to casks, which have two or more openings and no spear. Most major breweries now use internally speared kegs. Beer that is sold in kegs is fully conditioned. Beer intended for local use may be kegged without sterilization, however, the beer must stay cold.

=== Size ===
Historically a beer barrel was a standard size of 36 US gallons (140 L; 30 imp gal), as opposed to a wine barrel of 32 US gallons (120 L; 27 imp gal), or an oil barrel of 42 US gallons (160 L; 35 imp gal). Over the years barrel sizes have evolved, and breweries throughout the world use different sized containers. Even when the content capacity of two kegs are equal, e.g. metricized to 50 liters, the keg shape and tap system may differ greatly.

==== U.S. keg sizes ====
Most U.S. brewers sell beer in 1/2 barrels of 15.5 gallons, 1/4 barrels of 7.75 gallons, and 1/6 barrels of 5.17 gallons.

Since keg sizes are not standardized, the keg cannot be used as a standard unit of measure for liquid volume: despite this, a number of people still refer to kegs as if they were a unit of measure. This size standard varies from country to country and brewery to brewery, with most countries using the metric system rather than U.S. gallons.

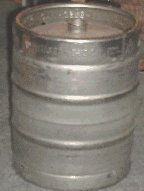
A typical keg (half-barrel) with a single opening in the center of the top end

In common parlance, the term keg refers to a half-barrel (15.5 U.S. gallon) vessel as this is the most common size used in restaurants, bars and limited home use. A quarter-barrel has a volume of 7.75 U.S. gallons. Generally, a keg is a vessel smaller than a barrel; thus, it is 30 gallons or smaller.

In the U.S. the terms half-barrel and quarter-barrel are derived from the U.S. beer barrel, legally defined as being equal to 31 U.S. gallons (this is not the same volume as some other units also known as barrels).

A 15.5 U.S. gallon keg is also equal to:

- Exactly 58.673882652 liters
- 124 U.S. pints
- 165 twelve U.S. fluid ounce drinks
- 6.875 24-unit cases of 12 fl oz cans
- 1,984 fluid ounces (U.S.)
- ≈12.90645 Imperial gallons
- ≈103.2516 Imperial pints
- 177 330ml drinks (U.K.)
- 7.375 24-unit cases of 330ml cans
- ≈2065.032 fluid ounces (imperial)

However, beer kegs can come in many sizes:

Size (US gal)	Size (liters)	No. of 12 fl oz drinks	No. of 16 fl oz drinks	No. of 20 fl oz drinks	Weight of full keg (lb)	Also known as
1.32	5	14	10	8	—	Mini Keg / Bubba (single-use/recyclable)
3.875	14.67	41	31	24	—	Eighth Barrel
5	18.92	53	40	32	55–60	Soda syrup / Corny Keg / Home Brew
5.17	19.56	55	41	33	58–60	Sixth Barrel / Torpedo Keg / Sixtel / Log
6.6	25	70	52	42	—	"Half Barrel" (Europe)
7.75	29.33	82	62	49	90	Quarter Barrel / Pony Keg
13.2	50	140	105	84	—	Import Keg (standard European "Barrel")
15.5	58.67	165	124	99	140–170	Half Barrel / Full Keg

===== Specifications for a U.S. 1/2 barrel keg =====
Accepted specifications for a standard keg are:

Height of keg	23.3 inches
Diameter of keg	16.1–17.15627 inches
Contents	1984 U.S. fluid ounces
Contents	15.5 U.S. gallons
Contents	12.90645 imp. gallons
Contents	58.673882652 liters
Full keg weight	161.5 pounds; 73.3 kg
Empty keg weight	29.7 pounds; 13.5 kg
Beer weight	131.8 pounds; 59.8 kg
24 × 12 fl oz case equivalent	6.875 cases
12 fl oz servings	165
16 fl oz (1 U.S. pint) servings	124

==== DIN-keg and Euro-keg ====
In Europe, the most common keg size is 50 liters. This includes the UK, which uses a non-metric standard keg of 11 imperial gallons: by coincidence, this is exactly 50.00699 litres.

The German DIN 6647-1 and DIN 6647-2 have also defined kegs in sizes of 20 and 30 liters.

Content	DIN 6647-1/-2	DIN-Keg diameter	Euro-Keg	Euro-Keg diameter
20 litres (4.4 imp gal)	310 mm (high)	363 mm (ø steel keg)	216 mm (high)	395 mm (ø steel keg)
25 litres (5.5 imp gal)	-	-	327 mm (high)	395 mm (ø steel keg)
30 litres (6.6 imp gal)	400 mm (high)	381 mm (ø steel keg)	365 mm (high)	408 mm (ø steel keg)
50 litres (11 imp gal)	600 mm (high)	381 mm (ø steel keg)	532 mm (high)	408 mm (ø steel keg)

=== Taps ===
Kegs are sealed to contain the liquid and pressurized gas for storage and transportation. Most beer is served carbonated, and this is most easily accomplished by storing it carbonated as well. Beer kegs are designed to maintain the carbonation in a beverage by storing it with pressurized carbon dioxide in the headspace above the liquid. The liquid is also dispensed using pressurized gas; the pressure of the gas provides mechanical force to overcome friction and gravity to push the beer to the dispensing location.

To serve the beverage, a keg must be tapped to breach the container so that pressurized gas can be added and the liquid can be dispensed. Originally, this was done by hammering a tapping rod through a cork bung, similar to how a keystone is still used today to tap unpressurized cask ales. Tapping a keg this way would often waste a bit of beer, which would be forced out under pressure until the tap was secured. By the 1950s and 60s when metal kegs had replaced wooden ones, common tap systems included Golden Gate, Hoff–Stevens, and Peerless taps, which all had one or two couplers for pressurizing and dispensing the beer but retained a separate bunghole for cleaning and filling the keg which was sealed with a wooden bung. These made it easier to tap the keg, but still had sanitation problems (from the wooden bung and attachments that penetrated the keg, and from ports that were at the bottom of the keg next to the floor) and tended to leave some beer inaccessible at the bottom of the keg.

In the 1960s and 70s, several similar styles of tap were created in Europe and America which used a single hole for cleaning, filling, pressurizing, and dispensing. A single bunghole at the top of the keg is used to clean and fill the keg, after which it is sealed with a metal assembly containing a ball bearing which acts as a stopper, held in place by the gas pressure inside the keg. The tap is twisted or slid into place atop the keg, and a lever provides the mechanical force needed to push the ball bearing down, providing access to the keg's contents. These taps, or "couplers", are more sanitary and easy to operate, and were adopted by major U.S. breweries like Anheuser-Busch in the 1970s and quickly displaced other taps to become the industry standard. One such system was referred to as Sankey after its designer (GKN Sankey Ltd., named for founder Joseph Sankey). The term Sankey, often misspelled "Sanke", has become a generic name for all of the similar industry standard couplers.

Today there are six industry standard couplers:

- The D System is used by most breweries in the Americas.
- The S System (Korb) is used by many breweries in Europe. It is similar to the D System but has a longer probe.
- The G System (or Grundy) is less common and is used by some British and Irish breweries and beers including Tennent's, Boddingtons, and Fuller's ESB.
- The U System (or U/E.C.) is uncommon and is used for a few Irish beers (mainly beers from Guinness/Diageo: Guinness, Harp, Kilkenny, and Smithwick's) and Magners cider.
- The A System (or Flat Top German) is used by many large German and Central European breweries. It slides into place rather than rotating.
- The M System is very uncommon and is used by only a few breweries in Germany and Central Europe (mainly for Aventinus Eisbock, Einbecker, Schneider, Veltins, and Żywiec; soft drink Kofola). It also slides into place.
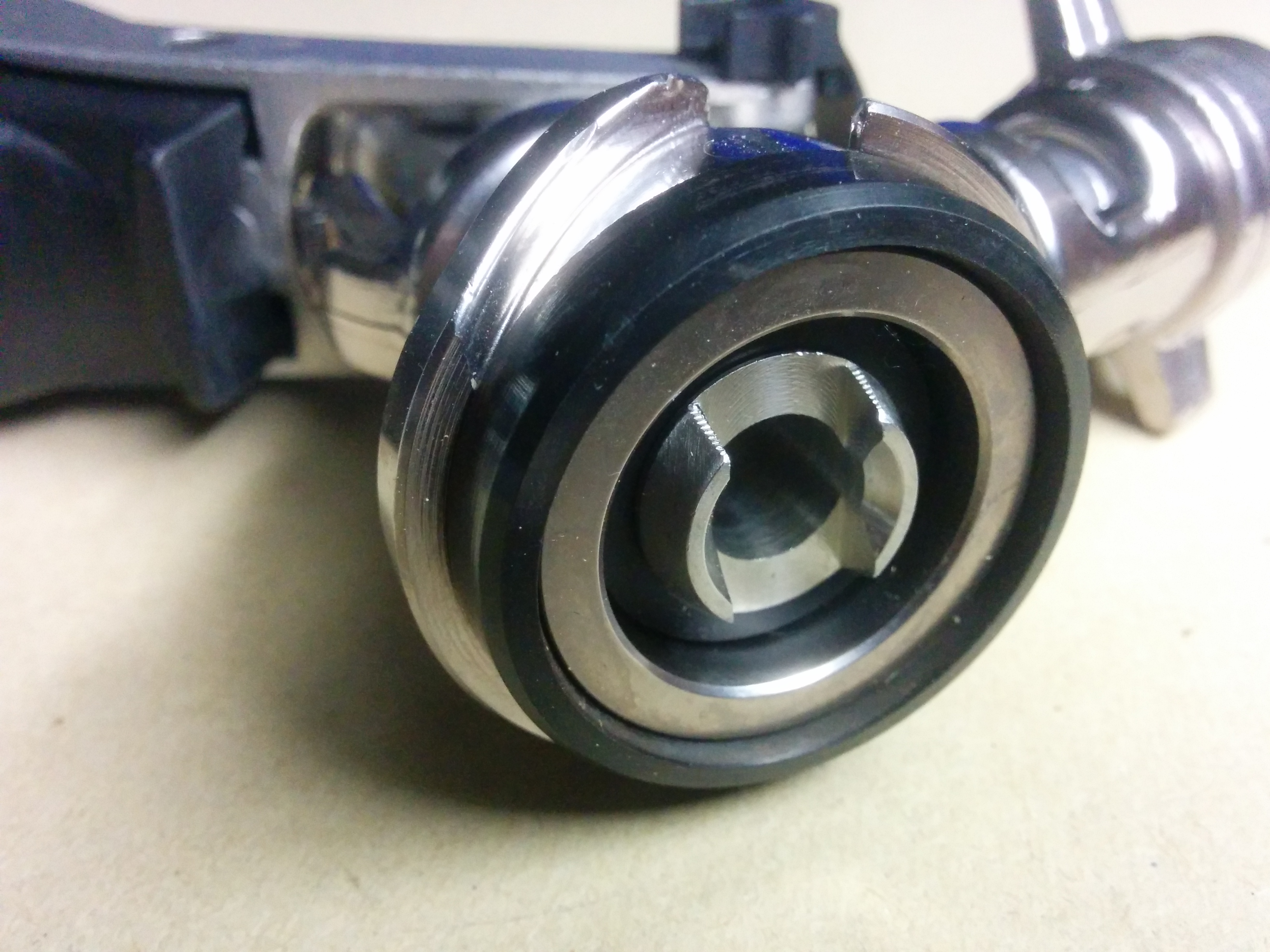
Type D

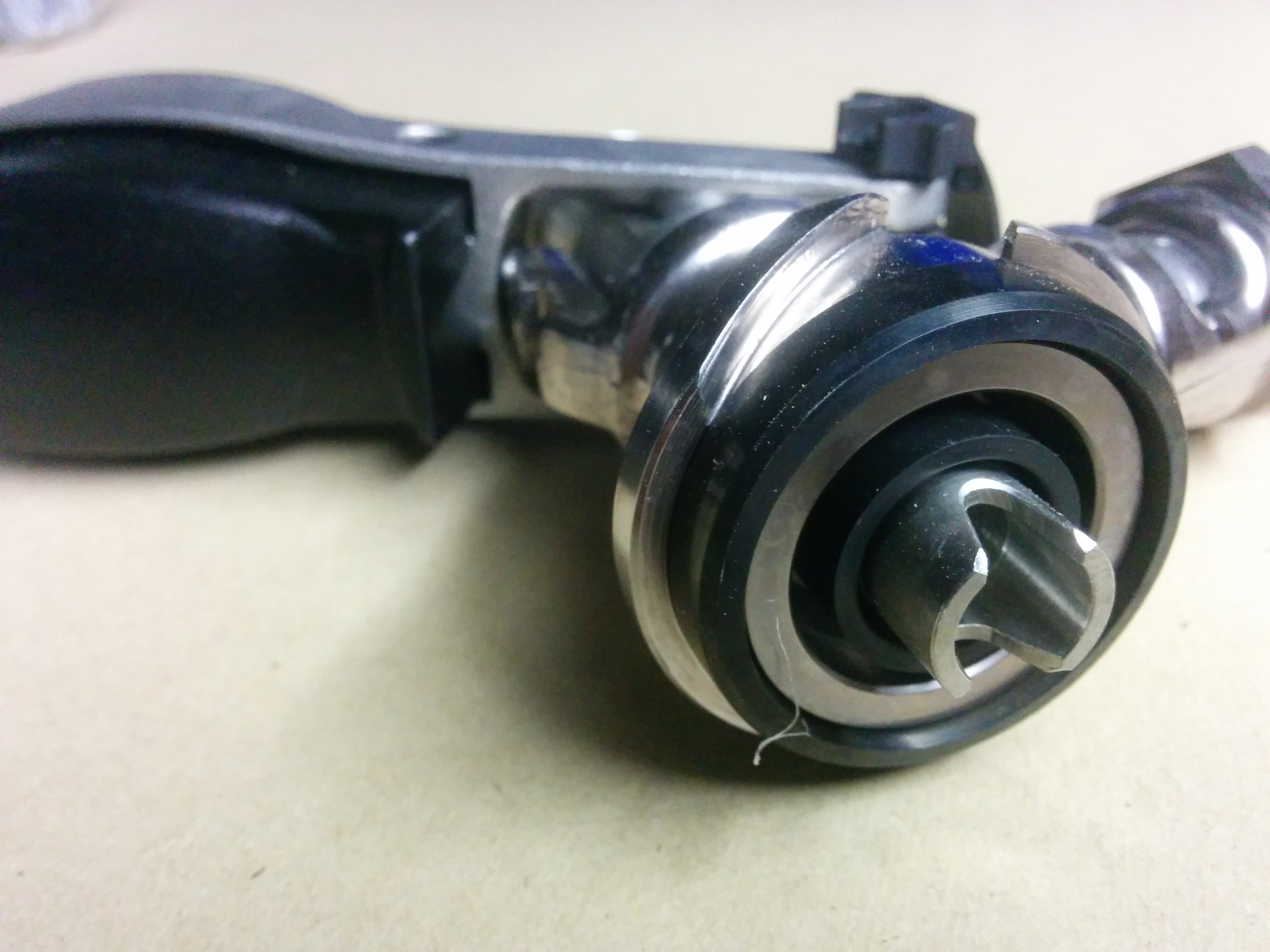
Type S

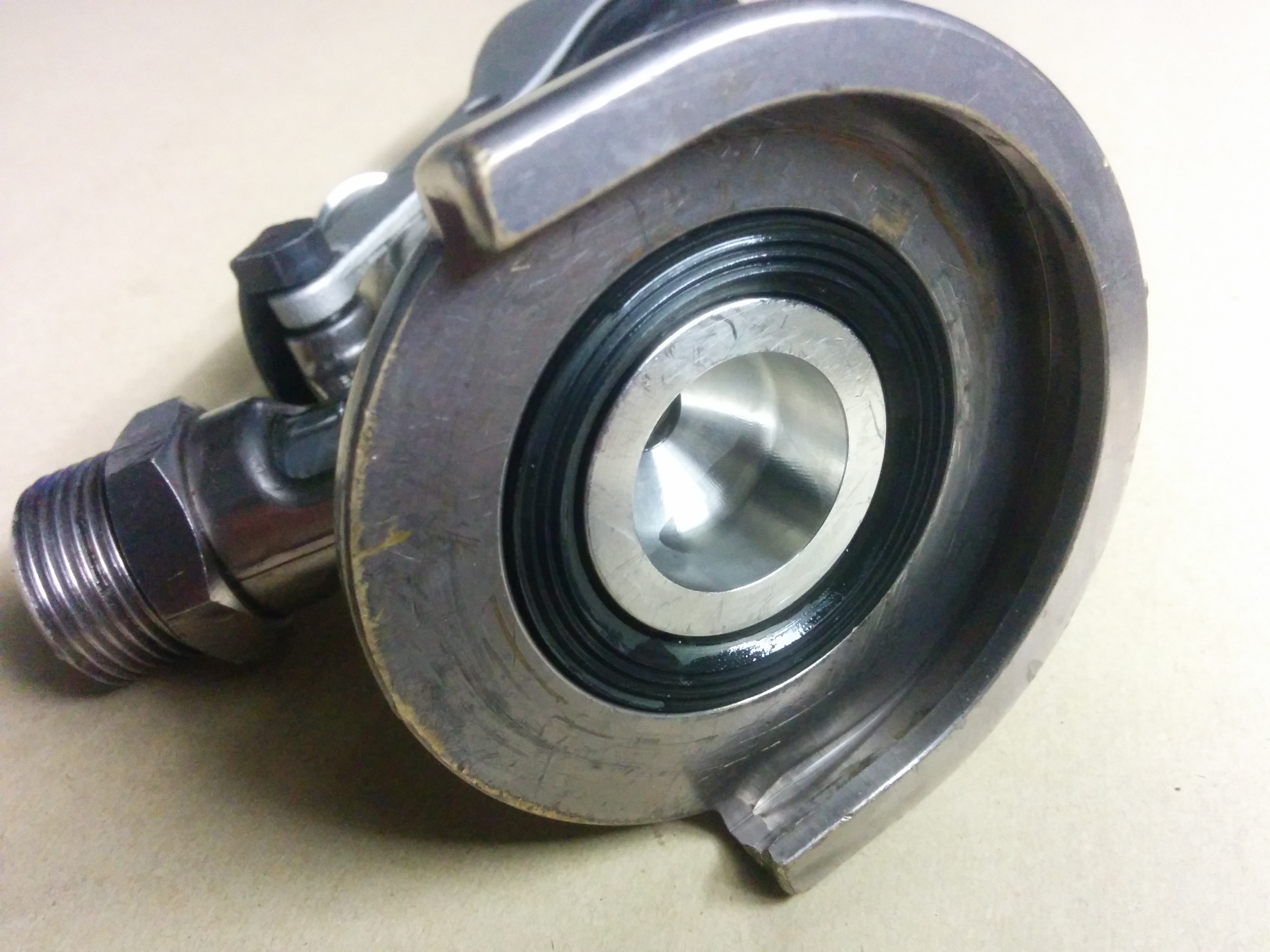
Type A

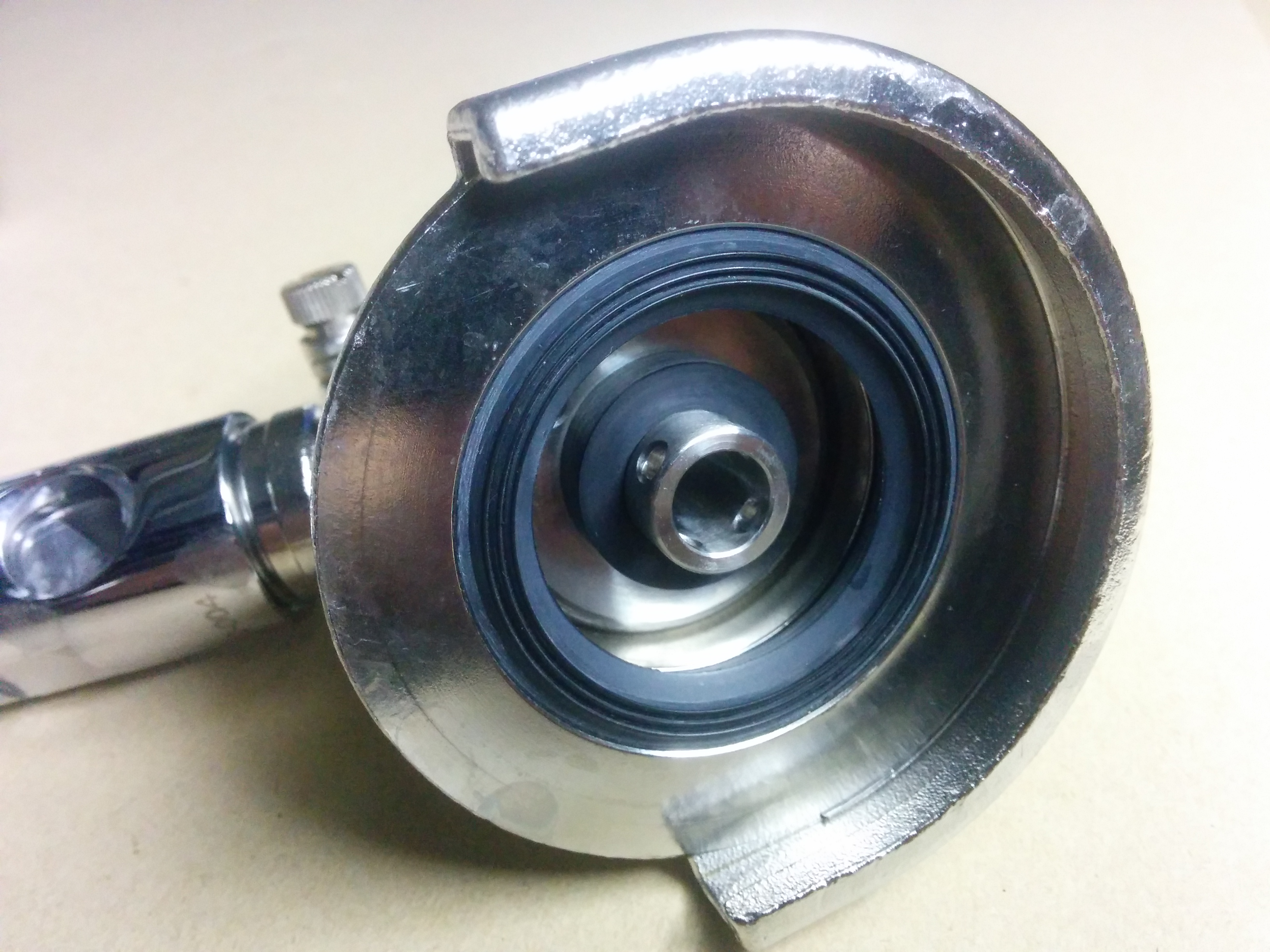
Type M

There are two different types of tapping equipment that are available for kegs. A "party tap" or "picnic tap" is a hand-operated pump that utilizes outside air, thus introducing oxygen and bacteria into the keg. This causes the beer to oxidize, affecting the taste; the partial pressure of CO_{2} will also decrease, causing the beer to go flat. Kegs dispensed with a party pump should be used within 18–24 hours so that the beer does not become unpalatable. Commercial installations, as well as some home users, use pure pressurized gas; these can preserve a keg up to 120 days with proper refrigeration. In simpler installations only CO_{2} is used to pressurize and dispense the beer, but in installations with very long lines between the keg and dispensing location (bars with customer-operated faucets at each table being an extreme example), the pressure needed to pump the beer for dispensing would over-carbonate the beer. In these situations, "beer gas" or "mixed gas" is used which combines CO_{2} with another gas, usually nitrogen. Nitrogen is 80 times less soluble in water than CO_{2}, so it can provide additional pressure without noticeably affecting flavor. Typical beer gas is 70-75% nitrogen and 25-30% CO_{2}, but the ideal ratio depends on the beer being served and the installation; more advanced installations blend the gas on site so it can be adjusted for each beer. A few beers like Guinness are required to be pressurized and dispensed with mixed gas; they usually also require the use of a special faucet that deliberately creates additional friction to force the nitrogen out of solution, creating a thick frothy head.

As with any pressurized container, a keg can cause injury, even at normal operating pressure, whether with compressed air or carbon dioxide:

The tapping system and pressure regulator both should be equipped with a pressure relief (blow off) device. If you are not familiar with tapping equipment, consult your retailer.

— printed on an Anheuser-Busch's keg cap

Commercially, kegs are usually kept in a refrigerated room for storage and dispensing, and liquid lines run from this room to all of the faucets in the restaurant. Kegs are too large to fit in a typical home refrigerator. A kegerator (specially designed for kegs, or converted from a suitable small refrigerator) can be used, but as these are somewhat specialized they are cost-prohibitive for the average consumer who has only occasional use for one, and are obviously impractical to bring to a beach or campsite. Instead, in the US and Australia, kegs are usually kept in a bucket of ice and/or water to keep the beer cool. Alternately, the keg can be kept at ambient temperature and served using a "jockey box", consisting of a cooler with beer coils (50–120-foot-long (20–40 m) metal dispensing lines arranged in a coil) and filled with ice, which acts as a heat exchanger to cool the beer to serving temperature by the time it reaches the faucet. European consumers, when not using a party pump, mainly use inline beer chillers, essentially the same concept as a jockey box but using a refrigeration unit instead of ice. Those chillers usually also have their own air compressor for keg pressurization.

== Other types of kegs ==
=== Cornelius keg ===
The Cornelius keg (also known as a "Corny keg" or "soda keg") was originally used by the soft drink industry. It is now commonly used to store and dispense beer, especially homebrewed.

Cornelius kegs were originally made by Cornelius, Inc., and were used for premix soft drinks. Since the arrival of newer technology such as bag-in-box packages, Cornelius kegs have become largely obsolete in the soft drink industry, and refurbished ones are readily available to hobbyists.

Cornelius kegs use two unique types of tap, both very similar to each other, known as ball locks and pin locks.

=== Mini keg ===
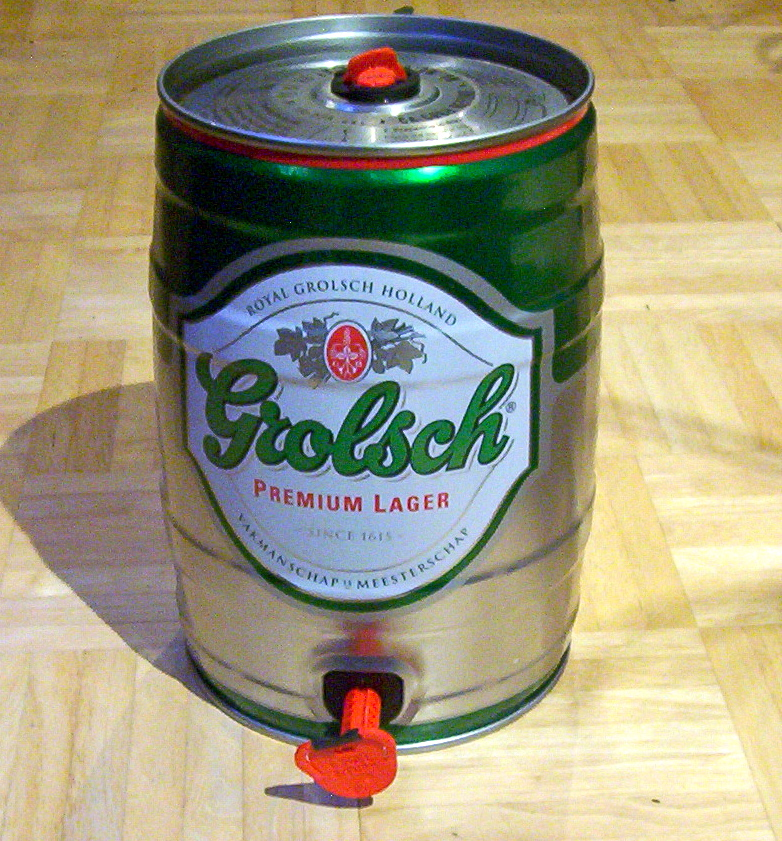
Mini keg of Grolsch beer.

The mini keg is a 5-liter keg produced for retail sales. Some brands come with a spout and pour from the bottom via gravity, while others may use a low cost pressurized tap. Mini kegs are typically not returned to the manufacturer for cleaning and refilling. The disposable kegs, being made of aluminum, may be recycled.

In Canada, Molson brewery dubbed the mini keg "Bubba". This name has now been genericized to generally apply to all 5-liter mini kegs in Canada. This might cause confusion, as a company called Bubba Keg is established in the U.S., and appears to not be associated with Molson. Today, mini kegs are widely available in liquor stores worldwide, with Heineken, Grolsch and Bitburger all adopting the design.

Recently in Austria, beer is available in mini kegs, either by a one-way type keg made of steel or out of a reinforced thermoplastic for about a €4 deposit.

=== Beer ball ===
Another type of mini keg is the "beer ball" or the "party ball", a disposable plastic ball that usually holds around 5.2-US-gallon (20 L), the equivalent of 55 twelve-ounce beers, though they can also be found in a smaller 3.8-US-gallon (14 L) size. Like kegs, it is necessary to tap the ball before the beer inside can be served.

=== One-way kegs ===
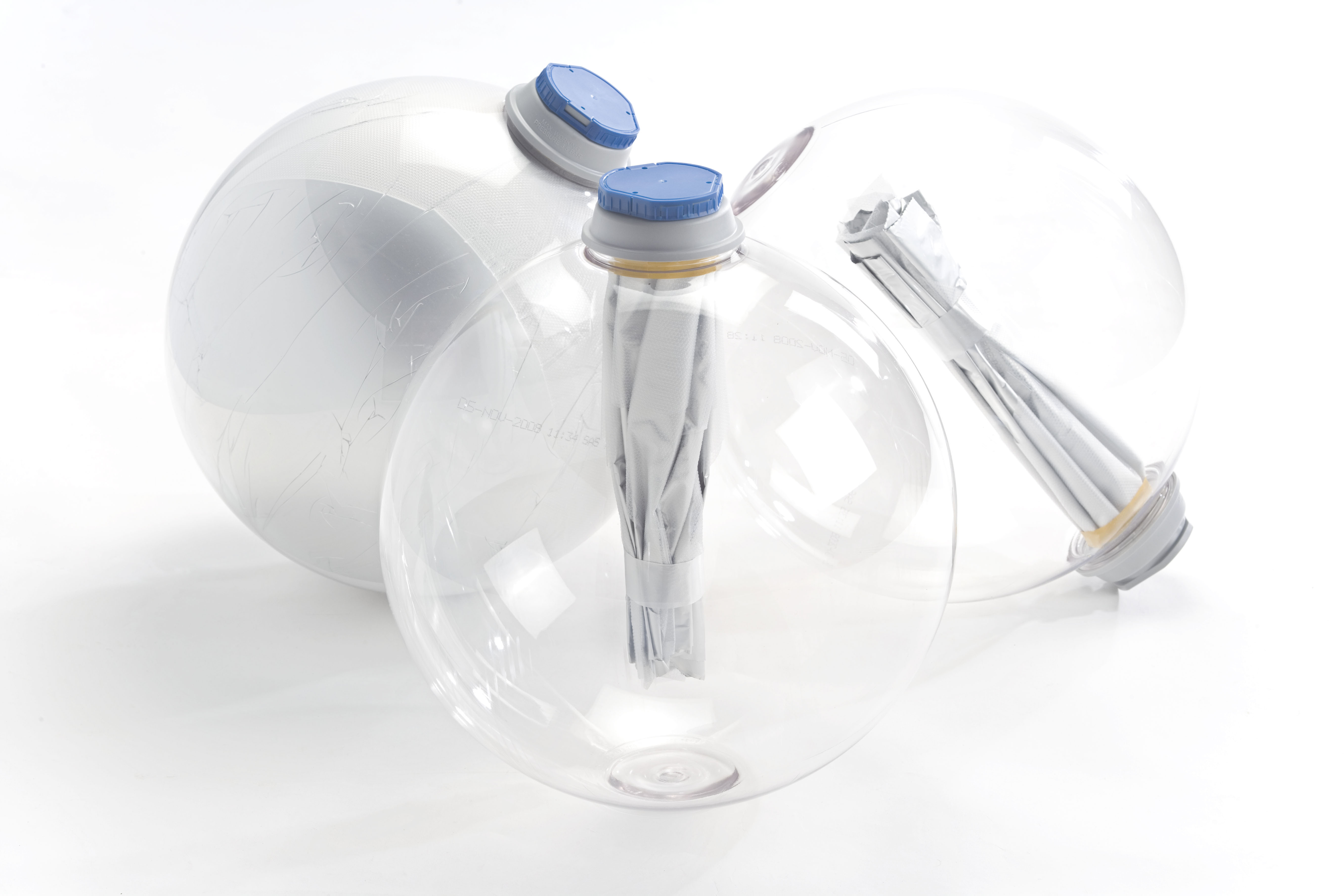
Example of bag-in-ball technology

One-way kegs, also known as disposable kegs or PET kegs, were invented in 1996. They are usually made of plastic. Some types have a cardboard outer packaging, which makes them easier to stack and transport, and also protects the plastic container. Some may use either bag in ball or spear technology. Products like the Hybrid keg have a puncture resistant wall and are easy to disassemble after use. Circular by design, the top and bottom chimes can either be re-used or recycled.

=== Quarter barrel (pony keg) ===
A quarter barrel, more commonly known as pony keg, is a beer vessel containing approximately 7.75 U.S. gallons (29.3 liters) of fluid. It is half the size of the standard beer keg and equivalent to a quarter of a barrel. The term pony refers to its smaller size – compare pony glass (quarter-pint) and pony bottle. It will serve roughly 82 twelve-ounce cups. The shape of a pony keg resembles that of a full-sized keg while being much easier to move manually. However, it shares many inconveniences with the bigger kegs, such as: often requiring a deposit when purchased, needing a tap to serve the contents, and posing difficulties in determining the amount of beer remaining (weighing the keg or observing its buoyancy are common techniques). Despite this, a pony keg can be a cheap way to provide beer for a medium-sized party. In some places, such as Cincinnati, the term pony keg can mean a convenience store that sells beer.

=== Sixth barrel ===
A sixth barrel keg contains approximately 5.2 gallons, and is becoming the choice for many establishments and breweries that wish to use kegs smaller than a half barrel. The sixth barrel kegs are nominally larger in size and volume compared to the Cornelius keg. They are normally fitted with a standard US Type D Sanke coupler on a single downspout; whereas, Corny kegs are normally fitted with a flip-hatch, and a dual connector pin-lock or ball-lock top. Although the sixth barrel torpedo keg is approximately the same height as the standard half barrel, the smaller foot print of the sixth barrel allows retailers have a greater variety of beer in a small space. This size keg is quickly replacing the quarter barrel size which has the same foot print as a half barrel keg, but is only half as tall. Other than smaller circumference, sixth barrel kegs are very similar to their full-sized counterparts in construction. A stainless Micromatic brand sixth barrel keg weighs approximately 14–15 pounds (6.4–6.8 kilograms) when empty, and approximately 58–60 pounds (26–27 kilograms) when full.

=== Eighth barrel ===
An eighth barrel has the same dimensions as a sixth barrel, but the seven bottom-most inches are hollow.

== UK and Irish keg supply structure ==
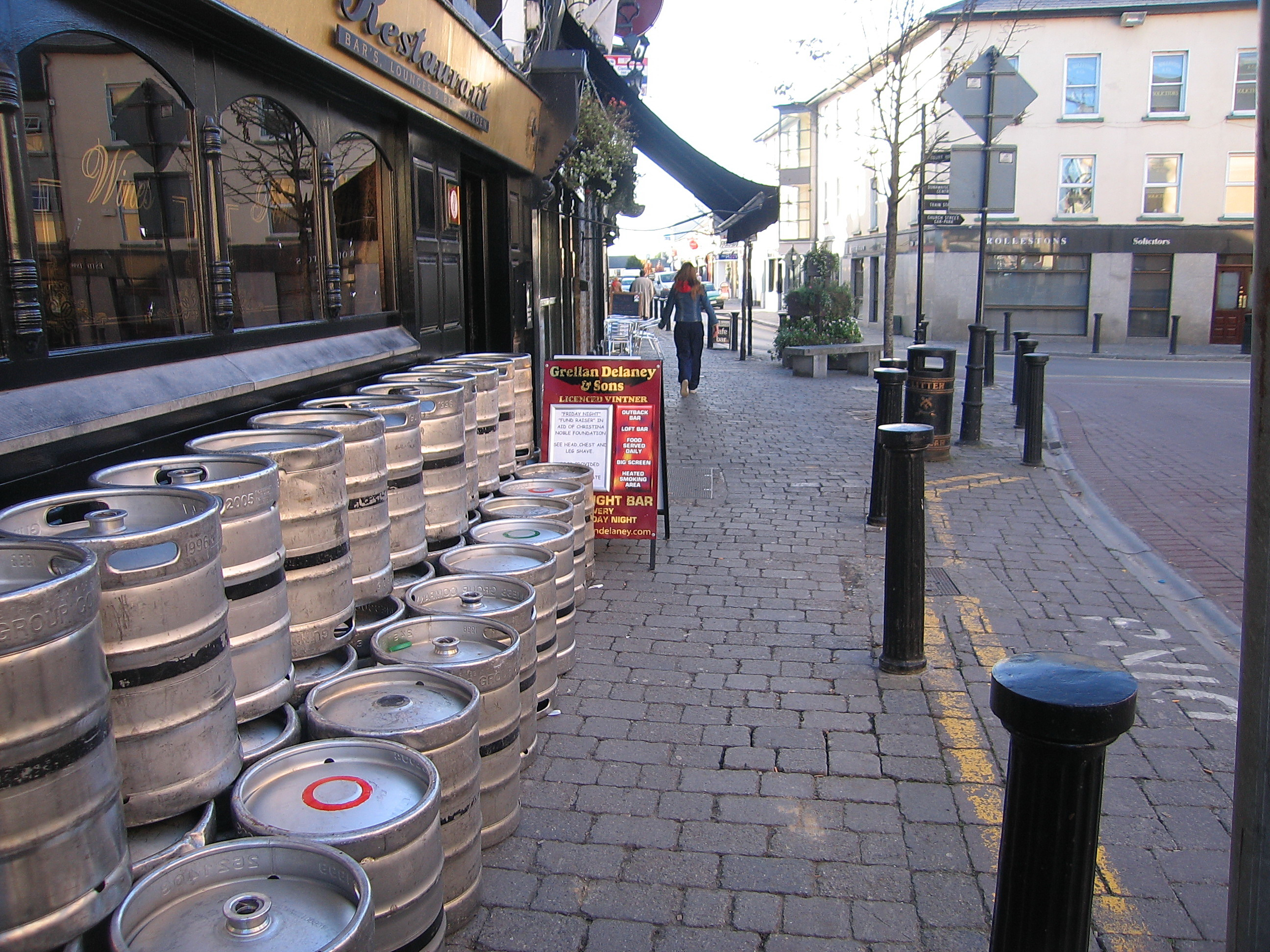
88-pint beer kegs lined up outside a pub in Portlaoise, Ireland

The beer vessel supply structure in the UK and Ireland is quite different, whilst the couplers for kegs have been largely standardised to sankey, grundy and interbrew, a couple of others exist such as UEC and U-Type, however these are much less common. The kegs themselves are made from stainless steel or aluminium. The standard keg size is 11 imperial gallons (50 litres or 88 imperial pints) and the vast majority of keg beers are supplied in this keg size. There are also smaller 30 litre (6.6 imperial gallons or 52.8 imperial pints) kegs, usually reserved for speciality and premium European beers.

A number of manufacturers also produce 18 imperial gallon (81.82 litres or 144 imperial pints) and 22 imperial gallon (100 litres or 176 imperial pints) kegs: however owing to their size they are not as popular, as manual handling is seen by some to be difficult, and as a result these tend to be used only for large-scale events and bars with a high output.

For bars that sell a large volume of beer, there is a 36 imperial gallon (163.64 litres or 288 imperial pints) keg. However, due to its very large size, few people can move it without assistance, making it an impractical choice otherwise.

== Keg laws ==
In the U.S. as of 2005, there are 21 states and numerous localities that have keg registration laws. The laws vary widely in terms of whom they target, what their intended purpose is, and how strongly they are enforced.

== See also ==
- Bag-in-box
- Cask ale
- Draught beer
- Firkin
- Growler (jug)
- "Keg in the Closet"
- Keg stand
