= Premix =

Premix usually refers to a substance or object which is mixed in an early stage in the manufacturing and distribution process.

The term may refer to:

- Compound feed, animal food
- Premix and postmix, methods of serving soft drinks
- Premixed flame
- Premix, the first part of the traditional Re-recording process by a re-recording mixer
