= Cornelius keg =

Stainless steel canister

Cornelius keg

A Cornelius keg (also known as a Corny keg or soda keg) is a stainless steel canister (keg) originally used as containers by the soft drink industry. They can be used to store and dispense carbonated or nitrogenated liquids. Cornelius kegs were originally made by Cornelius, Inc.

In the keg, fully made soda is stored under pressure just like standard cans and bottles. The soda is referred to as "premix" in the industry, as compared to "postmix" bag-in-box (BiB) packages which are concentrated syrup. BiB soda is cheaper but requires a high-quality water source and well-calibrated dispenser. Premix soda costs more and takes up more space, but can be used anywhere, and the equipment is simpler and cheaper.

Once the main method of delivering and dispensing soda, today kegs are largely obsolete in the soda industry. Cornelius kegs are now widely used for homebrewed beer and other homemade beverages such as soda or nitro cold brew coffee.

== Description ==
Pin lock (left) and ball lock quick-connect fittings, which mate to the keg ports. Hoses attach to the threaded flare fittings seen at the top. Fittings are color-coded for whether they connect to the gas (gray) or liquid (black or metal) port; these specimens are both for liquid lines.

A Cornelius keg is a stainless steel cylinder typically rated for a maximum pressure of 130 pounds per square inch (9.0 bar). There are three openings in the keg: a large central hole for cleaning and filling, and two ports for pressurizing and dispensing.

The central opening is used for filling and cleaning the keg and is large enough to permit reaching inside for hand scrubbing. The separate metal lid for the central opening provides a clamp mechanism that closes and seals the lid against the keg with a large rubber O-ring; this design ensures that the lid can only be opened when the keg is not pressurized. The lid also provides a pressure relief valve that is typically identified by a circular pull-ring (like a key ring). The relief valve can be manually opened to release the pressure in the keg; in the event of an unsafe overpressure in the keg, the relief valve automatically opens to avoid the hazard of bursting the cylinder.

The two ports are used to dispense the beverage, one for "gas in", and the other for "liquid out". Two metal or plastic tubes are attached to the ports on the inside of the keg. The "gas in" port has a short tube, not reaching the fluid. The "liquid out" port has a long tube (a "dip tube") which reaches the bottom of the keg. Headspace gas pressure (usually carbon dioxide and sometimes nitrogen forced into the "gas in" port) pushes the drink from the bottom of the keg up the tube and then out of the "liquid out" port connected to a tap or other dispensing device.

Quick-connect posts are attached to the ports. The posts have integral poppet valves which open when a hose with an appropriate fitting is attached to them. The quick-connect posts and fittings come in two mechanical varieties, namely pin lock and ball lock, which are not interchangeable. Historically, pin lock kegs were used primarily by the Coca-Cola company, while ball lock kegs were used primarily by Pepsi. Pin lock kegs use a bayonet mount consisting of radial pins on the posts and corresponding slots on the fittings. When the connector is attached, these pins hold it in place. The "gas in" post has two pins, while the "liquid out" has three, making it impossible to accidentally switch the gas and liquid hoses (which would harmlessly result in carbon dioxide bubbling up through the drink, while gas but no drink would be dispensed). Ball-lock kegs have flared ridges on the outside of the posts, which are gripped by small metal balls in the connectors. The ridges are different sizes: a smaller ridge for the gas post, and a larger ridge for the liquid post. Compared to pin locks, this is not as easy to visually distinguish, so additional visual cues are sometimes provided: the gas and liquid posts may use different colored rubber gaskets, the gas post may have small notches to distinguish it, and the kegs themselves may label the ports as "IN" and "OUT" or may have a bump to mark one of the ports. Unlike pin locks, it is possible to mistakenly force a ball lock fitting onto the wrong post (usually the liquid connector onto the "gas in" post), after which it is quite difficult to remove.

Cornelius kegs are produced in several capacities. The dimensions are slightly different for ball lock kegs versus pin lock kegs; pin lock kegs are wider and shorter than ball lock kegs of the same capacity.

Capacity	Ball lock kegs		Pin lock kegs	
Capacity	Diameter	Height	Diameter	Height
9 litres (2.38 US gal; 1.98 imp gal)	8.25 in (210 mm)	15 in (380 mm)		
3 US gal (11.4 L; 2.5 imp gal)	8.5 in (220 mm)	17 in (430 mm)	9 in (230 mm)	16 in (410 mm)
4.75 US gal (18.0 L; 3.96 imp gal)			9 in (230 mm)	22 in (560 mm)
5 US gal (19 L; 4.2 imp gal)	8.5 in (220 mm)	24.75 in (629 mm)	9 in (230 mm)	23 in (580 mm)
10 US gal (38 L; 8.3 imp gal)	12.25 in (311 mm)	24.75 in (629 mm)		

While the quick-connect fittings and posts for both pin and ball locks are standardized, the posts themselves have several styles, and the attachment of the post to the keg depends on the manufacturer. Kegs manufactured by Cornelius are typically threaded 19/32″ 18 threads per inch on both posts. Kegs manufactured under license by Firestone or John Wood are typically threaded differently (most commonly 9/16″ 18 TPI), and may have distinct threads for the gas and liquid posts.

Cornelius kegs use pressurized gas to dispense the beverage. This design is ideal for soda, beer, and other carbonated beverages which must be stored under pressure to keep the gas dissolved in the liquid. With appropriate storage temperatures and dispensing lines, the same gas used to dispense the liquid can also keep it at the optimum pressure for carbonation. A hand pump can be used to dispense the beverage using air but served this way the beverage will lose its carbonation and go flat over several hours to half a day, and perishable beverages like a beer can spoil. Carbonation pressure depends on temperature and the desired amount of carbonation. Sodas are carbonated up to 5 volumes of CO_{2}, which requires a pressure of 38.9 pounds per square inch (2.68 bar) at a serving temperature of 40 °F (4 °C). Beers are carbonated from 1.5 to 4.5 volumes of CO_{2}, depending on the style; typical pressures are around 10–20 psi (0.69–1.38 bar).

== Use in homebrewing ==
Surplus Cornelius kegs, which are largely obsolete from the soft-drink industry, have been adopted by homebrewers as an efficient alternative to bottling. This is because the kegs are easier to fill, clean, and maintain than industry-standard beer kegs, whose Sankey taps are designed for machines or specialized tools. They are one of the most versatile systems for the home-brewer. Unlike commercial brewers who fill bottles with automated machines, most homebrewers must bottle their beer by hand, which is laborious for a large batch. Without a keg or pressurizing system, the usual way to carbonate bottled beer is by adding a small amount of sugar during bottling, which leftover yeast will consume to produce carbon dioxide. It can be difficult to determine or measure the correct amount of sugar to add, and as glass bottles and metal bottle caps are not designed for high pressures, mistakes can cause the bottles to explode. The most common size of Cornelius keg holds 5 US gallons (19 liters) which conveniently matches the size of a typical batch of home-brewed beer, and kegs can be used to carbonate the beer. This means that rather than saving, cleaning, and filling approximately fifty bottles, the brewer only needs to fill one keg.

== See also ==
- Homebrewing
