= Kegerator =

Refrigerator made to store and dispense from kegs

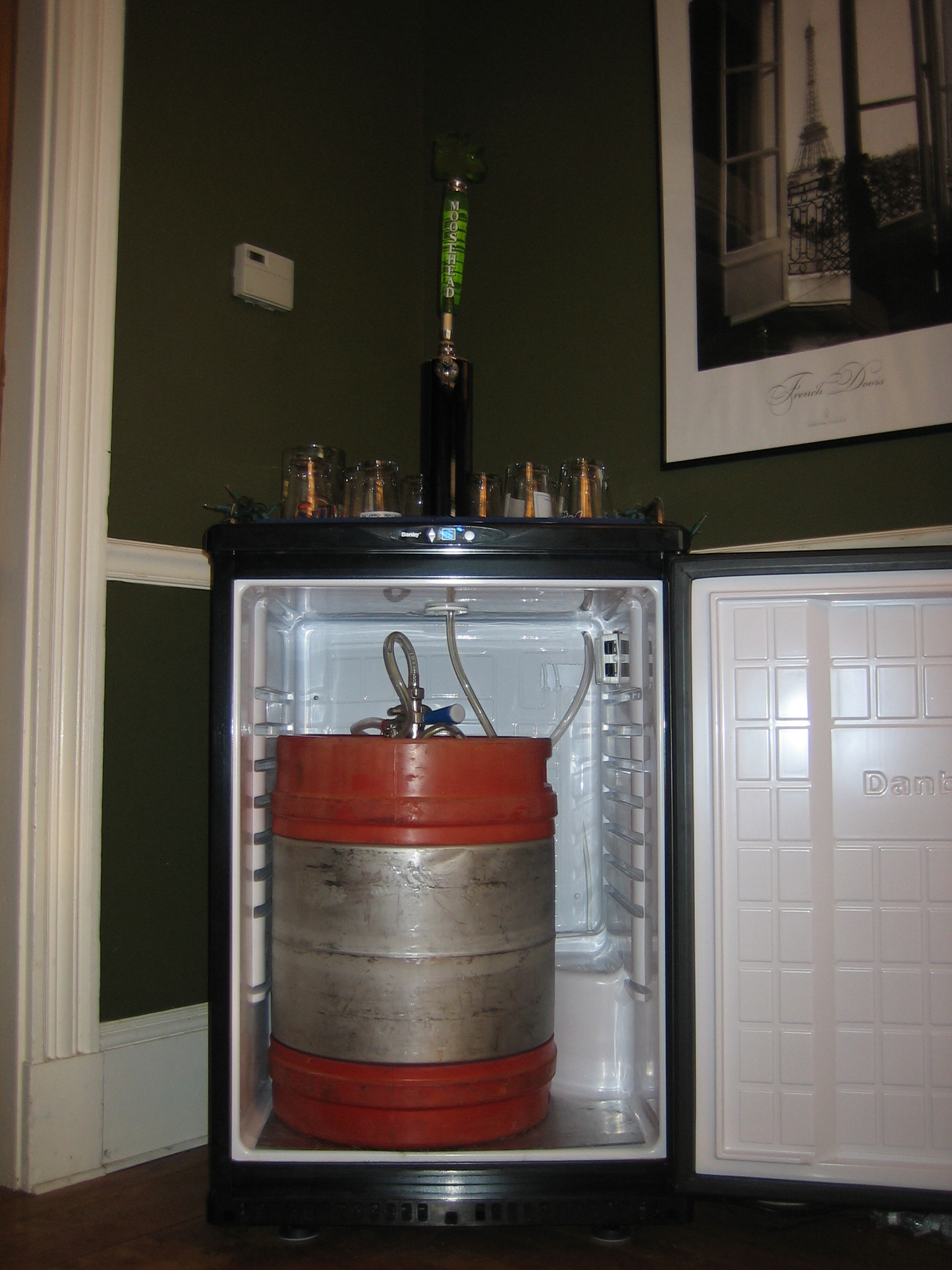
Kegerator containing a half-barrel keg

Kegerator, a portmanteau of the words keg and refrigerator, is a refrigerator that has been designed or altered to store and dispense from kegs.

A kegerator keeps a keg in a refrigerated environment and uses CO_{2} to pressurize and dispense beverages from the keg. This process keeps the contents of the keg fresh and carbonated for up to 60 days on average.

Kegerators are specifically designed and available for both commercial and residential use, but a standard refrigerator can often be reconfigured into a kegerator with a kegerator conversion kit.

Not all standard refrigerators have enough room for a keg, so kegerators are specifically designed to house one or more kegs along with the dispensing system.

Kegerators are typically used to dispense draft beer, but are also gaining popularity for dispensing wine, cold brew coffee, and kombucha with certain modifications.

== Components ==
The kegerator contains the following components:

- Stainless steel keg
- CO_{2} cylinder
- CO_{2} pressure regulator, with inlet and outlet pressure gauges
- Keg Coupler (also known as a Keg Tap)
- Beer and air lines
- Tower
- Drip tray
- Shank
- Faucet
- Faucet handle

A crucial part of any draft beer system is the keg coupler, the part inside the kegerator that taps the keg. Different types of kegs require different keg couplers, so considering what you plan on serving is important in order to purchase the appropriate coupler.

- System D (U.S. Sankey) – standard for North American beer
- System S (European Sankey) – most common for European beer (Beck's, Heineken, Amstel, Stella Artois)
- System U – used for stout and ale by a few breweries in UK/Ireland (Guinness, Harp)
- System G – used by some breweries in UK/Ireland, and in the United States by Anchor Brewing. Broadly used in Argentina By commercial, craft, and home brew.
- System A – chiefly used by breweries in Germany (Warsteiner, Paulaner, Hacker Pschorr)
- System M – used by some German breweries (Schneider, Einbecker)
- Pin and ball lock home brew keg taps – designed to work with Cornelius kegs.

The D, S, U and G couplers are secured to the keg by twisting them in place (like a screw). The A System coupler is often called a "German Slider" because, unlike the other couplers, it slides in place and can be secured at any angle. The M-coupler also slides onto the keg, but it taps different brands than the German Slider. Home brew couplers are different in that they have a separate component for the gas in and the liquid out.

== Economics ==
Kegerators may have cost benefits that make them a viable choice over canned or bottled beer.

Because a keg typically stores large amounts of cold beer, kegerators can save up to 60% on costs when compared to the same amount of volume in cans and bottles. Depending on the brand of beer, cost savings may be even greater.

The cost of a kegerator can range anywhere from $400 to $7,000 for a premium model. Refills range between $5 and $22.

== Conversion kits ==
A kegerator conversion kit allows you to convert an existing refrigerator into a beer-dispensing kegerator. This may be a more economical solution if you already have a refrigerator ready to use. You must consider whether or not the refrigerator will be able to hold a keg. Many refrigerators have a step inside them that houses the compressor and takes up half the bottom of the fridge, which means there isn't enough space above or in front of the step for a keg. Pre-configured kegerators are designed with this in mind and install the compressor in a manner that allows plenty of room.

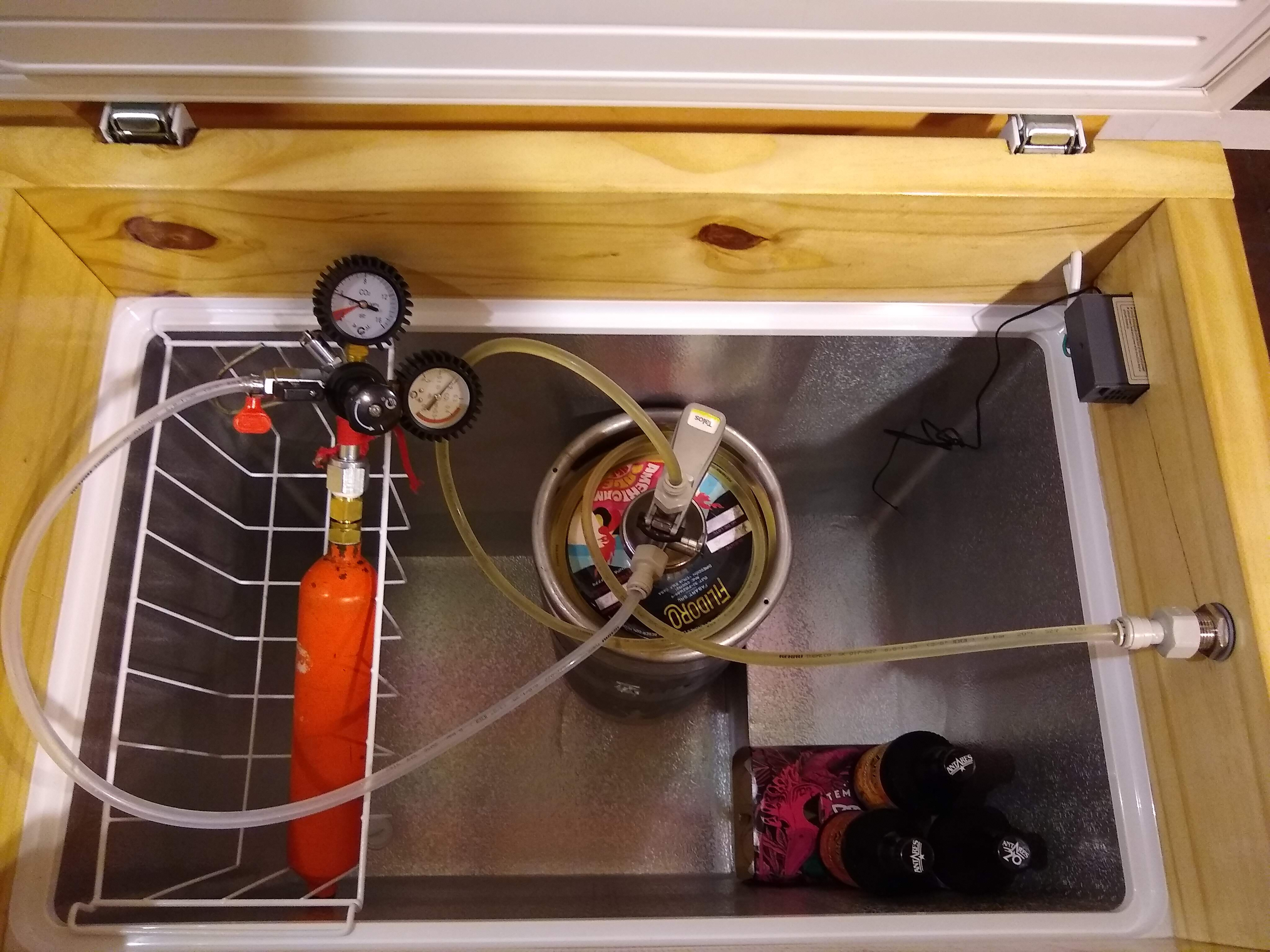
Inside of a keezer with shank/tap, temperature control and the door hinges attached to the wood collar

Conversion kits are configured to either dispense through the door of the fridge or through the top into a draft beer tower. Door mount kits have a shank that goes through the door, with an attachment for the faucet on the outside and a hose nipple for the beer line on the inside. A draft beer tower would extend above the top of the fridge and already includes the faucet, shank, and 5' beer line.

Installation requires tools, such as a socket wrench set, screwdriver, and a drill with a hole saw bit to modify the refrigerator. A CO_{2} tank can be installed inside the fridge if there is enough room, or placed outside the fridge and secured into place.

You can also convert a top opening chest freezer into a beer dispenser (sometimes called a keezer) with the use of a thermostat control unit. The advantage of a keezer is that you are assured it will get cold enough to dispense beer at the proper temperature range (32–38 degrees Fahrenheit) and it usually has more interior floor space than a refrigerator, allowing it to store and dispense more kegs. The disadvantage is that it requires the thermostat to be overridden to ensure you don't freeze your kegs and you have to lift the heavy kegs up and over the freezer wall. You can accomplish this conversion with a tower kegerator conversion kit or build an extension (collar) on top of the freezer to mount the door and taps onto it.

== Configurations ==
Kegerators are generally designed for use with beer kegs, but they are gaining popularity for dispensing other types of drinks, most notably wine, cold-brewed coffee, kombucha, and soda. With home brew kegs, you can put whatever liquid you want inside the keg, pressurize it and dispense it with a kegerator. Different types of liquids require different alterations to the dispensing system. Wine and cold brewed coffee use a CO_{2}/Nitrogen blend to pressurize the kegs. These types of drinks also require all stainless steel contact with the dispense system fittings because the higher acid content can corrode the chrome-plated brass normally found in dispense systems. You may also need to change out the beer line for a silicone wine line, which is less likely to impart flavors. In many larger cities, coffee houses and wineries are offering their products in commercial kegs for use in a kegerator. If that is not available, you can always fill a home brew keg yourself.

Pouring Guinness or other nitrogen beers from a kegerator requires a stout faucet, nitrogen regulator, and a nitrogen tank. The stout faucet has a small restrictor disc inside the faucet head. Forcing the beer through the restrictor disc creates the rich and creamy head that nitro beers are known for. A nitrogen regulator or CO_{2}/nitrogen adapter is required and should be set to 30 psi. Nitrogen tanks are filled with a 75% nitrogen and 25% CO_{2} blend referred to as mixed gas or beer gas.

== Kegerator storage ==
For a properly stored keg in a kegerator, beverage freshness depends on the style of beer. Pasteurized beers can stay fresh from three to six months. For non-pasteurized beers, the keg will stay fresh for approximately two months.

== See also ==
- Cornelius keg
