= Canada's Worst Handyman 5 =

- Season 5
- Starring: Andrew Younghusband
- No. of episodes: 7

Release
- Original network: Discovery Channel Canada
- Original release: May 3 – June 14, 2010

Season chronology
- ← Previous; Canada's Worst Handyman 4 Next → Canada's Worst Handyman 6

Canada's Worst Handyman 5 was the fifth season of the Canadian reality TV show Canada's Worst Handyman, which aired on the Discovery Channel. As with previous years, five people, nominated by their family or friends, enter the Handyman Rehabilitation Centre to improve their handyman skills. This year, the Handyman Rehabilitation Centre is located at the Delta Upsilon fraternity house located on Central Avenue in London, Ontario. As with the previous season, contestants must purchase the 245 supplies they need, this time to renovate individual rooms in the frat house. Group challenges this season center on the renovation of a central kitchen. There are several changes that were made for this season: contestants were allowed full access to a computer during challenges for informational purposes and nominators were not permitted to make suggestions to their nominees. It is also the first time since the first season that the nominators are not present at the end of the episode when the most improved and the worst are named.

== Experts ==
- Geoff Woodmansey has been in the trades for most of his life. One of his recent projects was shown on the TV show Junk Raiders, where he and others attempted to renovate a loft using only recycled and reclaimed materials.
- Gail Prosser-Craig is the show's carpentry expert. She was trained in finish carpentry and currently operates a renovation company entirely staffed by women.

== Contestants ==
- Angela Finseth, 30, a stay-at-home mother of three from Spruce Grove, Alberta (near Edmonton), has been bitten by the decoration bug, but the quality of her redecoration leaves much to be desired. In fact, her husband and nominator, Matt Hanley, an audio engineer, is said to be disgusted by her workmanship. However, it is often his attitude that makes her give up the projects. As the season progresses, it becomes clear that Matt wants Angela (the only female nominee) to fail so she will stop doing handiwork.
- Deen Flett, 38, a youth worker from High Prairie, Alberta (at the time of taping; he has since moved to Stony Plain, Alberta at the time of airing, both of which are near Edmonton), is completely clueless when it comes to tools, not knowing what they are and what they are used for. His twin brother, Doug, is putting him in rehab because he does not want to bail him out of handiwork trouble again.
- Cory Goertzen, 27, an auto mechanic from Burns Lake, British Columbia, is a person who rushes through projects to finish them. His short temper has led his fiancée, Kim Pettigrew, to nominate him based on his attitude and he accepted simply to prove her wrong.
- Simon Larade, 63, a retired school teacher from North Sydney, Nova Scotia, is passionate about home renovation. According to his wife of 37 years and original nominator, Linda, the passion may be there, but the skill needed to get things done is not—so much so that she has barred Simon (the oldest nominee overall) from doing projects on the ground floor of their home. Linda was only able to attend the first half of the rehab course due to other commitments and for the second half was replaced by the couple's son, Joey.
- Matt Webb, 24, a former soldier from Elmsdale, Nova Scotia, is a self-described hillbilly. Handiwork is in his blood; he had built his house from the ground up. However, his friend and nominator, Keith MacNeil (referred to as Silent Keith on the show because he went through almost the entire series without saying a word; the only exception being the Frat House Bender: Part Two Challenge in Episode 6), thinks that it is all for naught, as his house is crooked and nothing is properly done.

== Synopsis ==
Contestant (with hard hat colour)	Nominator	1	2	3	4	5	6	7
Angela	Matt	IN	IN	IMP	WORST	NOM	IN	IN
Cory	Kim	IN	IMP	IN	IN	IN	WORST	IN
Deen	Doug	IMP	IN	IN	IN	IN	IN	CWH
Matt	Keith	WORST	IN	IN	IN	IMP	IN	IN
Simon	Linda/Joey	IN	WORST	WORST	IMP	IN	IMP	IN

CWH – The contestant is Canada's Worst Handyman.
WORST – The contestant is the worst of the episode.
NOM – The nominator of the contestant is the worst of the episode.
IN – The contestant was considered for the worst for this episode.
IMP – The contestant is the most improved of the episode.

=== Episode 1: The Frat Pack ===
Original Airdate: May 3, 2010

The contestants arrive at the Handyman Rehabilitation Centre, where the nominators await them with their colour-coded hats: Angela in pink, Simon in red, Cory in yellow, Matt in orange and Deen in blue. They are also greeted at the door by Andrew and over a video monitor by former Delta Upsilon alumnus Alan Thicke, who had lived in the house during his education at the University of Western Ontario. The second floor of Canada's Worst Frat House contains the five rooms they are to renovate. Inside each room is a binder consisting of a description of the 31 challenges that the nominees will do, as well as a monitor with a picture of Thicke.

- Entering: The first task is to enter the rooms, which have all been boarded up on the outside. Whereas Matt enters easily by kicking the door open from behind the boards, Deen tries to prod the door open with a hockey stick before changing gears and cutting the boards with a circular saw (as revealed in the following episode the show's crew stopped him halfway through when he was found to be holding his hand mere inches from the blade). Cory gets in by ripping all the wood apart with a chain saw. Simon and Angela both enter by undoing the screws holding the boards to the door frame, but Simon finishes much faster.
- Shopping: For the second year in a row, the nominees travel to Canadian Tire, where they are each given $4,000 to locate and purchase the 245 items that will be needed for their 31 challenges ahead. Cory, who tries to cheat by soliciting a Canadian Tire staffer to pick all his tools, manages to get creative with accounting and goes slightly over-budget, but enough that the difference is covered by the Canadian Tire money he gets back. Matt (180/245) gets a few items not on the list, intending to build a bar in the room. Simon (104/245) goes over budget, while nominator Matt's insistence of buying more expensive tools (and other arguing) causes Angela also go over budget (the number of items she got was not stated). Deen (57/245) has the worst trip, with Doug gathering all 57 items.
- Home Challenge: The Trunk: The contestants are tasked to, prior to entering rehab, build a trunk that can support their own weight out of a sheet of plywood and an assortment of hinges, handles, and other fasteners. Despite promising starts by all (Matt's plan involves not wasting wood), all of them fail when they discover that their lids are too small for the boxes they have made. In addition, Angela cuts the floor to her garage when she uses a circular saw to cut her plywood that's placed on the ground, Cory cutting his wood with a chain saw, Simon with multiple saws after frustration over the operation of a table saw leads him to switch to a jig saw.
- The Workbench: The contestants must build a workbench to start their project. Cory is first to finish, but his bench only consists of a plywood board and four 2x4s for legs. Matt's workbench is a single sawhorse, which must combined with his ladder and a piece of plywood to form a bench. Deen's idea of a cube with a top is a pass, even supporting Andrew's weight. Simon's workbench is too low, but otherwise fine. Angela fails when it is "slightly too wobbly" due to a short leg.
- Group Challenge: Demolition: Group challenges this year are centred around the demolition of the kitchen on the first floor. Everyone begins ripping things apart, with Matt and Cory tearing the dishwasher while the plumbing and electricity is still connected, creating a potentially lethal hazard. After being chastised by Andrew on electrical safety, the team continues going in an ad-hoc style, earning the team another chastising by the experts when a vent hood nearly falls on them.

In final inspections, Cory's workbench is harshly critiqued and admits that he does not take criticism easily (though Andrew and the experts make the point that brutal honesty will be given in spades over the course of the series). Praise is given to Deen's workbench, while Angela's workbench is given a minor critique for not making the legs flush to the floor. Simon admits that he lacks organization and Matt admits that he was the worst of the episode after the group challenge, as he felt that his effort in both his workbench (which he rebuilt, but still failed) and the group challenge was "half-assed." The experts agree that the worst is based on who made more safety violations in the episode—Geoff choosing Matt for disconnecting a running dishwasher without switching off the power and standing on a stove and Gail choosing Cory for using a chainsaw indoors in a tight space. In the end, Matt is declared the worst, while Deen is named the most improved of the episode, due to building the workbench that exceeded the "non-trunk." For his homework challenge, Matt is forced to build a new workbench and paint the phrase "Am I Finished?" on the walls of his room until he believed it is properly complete. While doing so, he admits to various incomplete projects around the house.

Web extras for this episode:

- Andrew Responds to Your Questions: Between seasons, viewers could ask Andrew questions regarding either Canada's Worst Handyman or Canada's Worst Driver on the Discovery Channel website, which he would answer on the show. Questions answered included the following:
  - With regards to a "worst of the worst" series, Andrew replies that it has been floated around but never acted upon. He does note that there would be five contestants that would have been named Canada's Worst Handyman at the end of this season, so a "worst of the worst" season for Canada's Worst Handyman could come as early as next season.
  - With regards to who the worst of the four contestants named Canada's Worst Handyman are so far, Andrew simply defers the answer to the outcome of a "worst of the worst" season.
  - With regards to why there has not been a contestant for Canada's Worst Driver or Canada's Worst Handyman from Newfoundland and Labrador, the only province so far unrepresented in the history of the two shows combined (that has since changed with Santana Pike in Canada's Worst Driver 10; none of the territories have also been represented on the show as well), Andrew states that there has not been a "fellow Newfie" who has even come close in the nomination process and thus, he believes that Newfoundlanders are simply better drivers and handymen.
  - With regards to how the experts interact with the contestants, Gail states that the contestants often leave messes lying about when doing their work, making the worksite seem unprofessional. However, she also defends the contestants, stating that they need to be nurtured with respect to their skills.
- The New Nominees: Andrew gives his opinions on the new nominees, in particular, that the nominees (Deen aside) are more experienced (in terms of having done handiwork) but less skilled. More specifically, the nominees, having not had any direction into what the right and wrong way to do things and thus, accept mistakes as being correct due to not knowing otherwise. (As a result, the experts often demand a higher standard compared to previous years.) As with previous seasons, he also gives a quick rundown on each of the contestants and their quirks.
- Geoff's Take (2): Geoff, after numerous glitches, manage to give his take on the contestants. He notes that the number of mishaps, including tools catching on fire, is a major issue this season. Another major issue this year was the age of the house, which is especially prominent during the upcoming electrical challenges, where the various different styles of wiring was revealed that the electrical wiring was considered dangerous for the house, not just the contestants.

=== Episode 2: Lofty Ideas ===
Original Airdate: May 10, 2010

At the start of the episode, Andrew notes that the house in question was abandoned by Delta Upsilon in 2008, two years before the series was filmed. Furthermore, filming had to be stopped at various points in the first episode by the cameramen due to unsafe tool use by the contestants, leading the experts to teach the contestants a lesson on tool safety.

- The Loft Bed: After a lesson on framing, the contestants must build a loft bed (essentially, an indoor deck), complete with lag bolts to secure the frame to a post, from which a plywood board is placed on top, to support the bed's mattress. Matt does this easily, as he is experienced at building decks. Deen also passes after some work, though he mismeasures his plywood covering. The rest, however, do not fare as well. Simon admits to failing after failing to support the outside corner. Cory, ambitious to decorate the posts after quickly finishing the structure, fails after admitting to not reading the instructions to the post covering. Angela fails after her husband Matt gets her to tear down the walls in order to mount the bed to the wall.
- The Loft Bed Ladder: The contestants, to complete the loft bed, must build a ladder out of ABS plumbing pipes. Deen got pipes, but not T joints to make the rungs; some were provided to him so he would not fail. Andrew lashes out at everyone (Simon in particular) for not reading the instructions to the adhesive when assembling the ladder. Matt fails as he had purchased PVC adhesive instead of ABS adhesive (which would mean that the adhesion was, at best, only temporary). Cory fails as his adhesive sets before he assembles the whole ladder. Deen also fails when he admitted that he had never closed the adhesive can lid the whole time he was using it, which allowed the adhesive to set. Angela and Simon also fail, though Simon learns an important lesson on reading the instructions.
- The Closet Door: The contestants must resize a hollow core door for their closet, before having to hang it. Deen, however, asks for his lesson (taught by Gail) on how to cut open the door to resize it to be repeated before he begins. After the resizing itself goes without incident, the contestants take a break for the day before installing the door the next day. Deen fails as his closet door fails to close due to the hinges being not properly installed, and a similar outcome awaits Angela. Matt discovers his door had been cut too short, while Cory discovers that his door had been cut too narrow. Simon also fails due to not getting the door to latch.
- The Cabinet: The contestants must assemble a prefab MasterCraft industrial-grade cabinet. Matt fails as he accidentally installs a component upside-down. Cory, after being repeatedly convinced to read the instructions by Kim, passes quickly. Angela discovers that her doors were installed upside-down and fails. Simon also fails due to not reading instructions, while Deen fails after wanting to put off his cabinet until the group challenge.
- Group Challenge: The Kitchen Cabinets: Deen and his "wolf pack" must frame the kitchen island, as well as hang the cabinets. Cory gets cracking on Deen's unfinished cabinet, while Simon and Angela gets to mounting the other four cabinets and Matt gets framing. However, Deen's disappearance after giving his initial orders leads Matt and Cory to mutiny, leading Angela and Simon, who have accomplished nothing in frustration, to join them in mutiny. Deen returns to find none of the others at work and none of the work is done in the three hours allotted to the challenge even after the other four return.

In final inspections, Simon and Deen both admit to defeat. Geoff is not present for the final inspection due to personal matters, so Gail and Andrew are left to do the final inspections without him. Matt thanks Gail for giving him a "butt kicking" after the glue debacle (being forced to reassemble the ladder with the proper adhesive on his own time), while Cory manages to fix his projects on his own time. Simon and Angela are chastized for beds which fall apart, while Deen admits to Gail a growing passion for building. Cory is named the most improved for finding the time to fix his failures, while Simon is named the worst for not following instructions (despite Andrew asserting that Deen's lack of leadership was much worse than anything Simon did). As homework, Simon must read instructions on how to read instructions.

=== Episode 3: On a Bender ===
Original Airdate: May 17, 2010

Since the previous episode, Deen's "Wolf Pack" name has stuck with everyone else, with the group challenges this season being nicknamed "wolf pack challenges." Even the golden hard hat is adorned with the label "wolf pack leader" (and the most improved being named as such) and the trophy for Canada's Worst Handyman adopting the "wolf pack" theme.

- The Metal Studs: The contestants, after a lesson on how to build using metal studs, must build a wall using these studs. However, during the lesson, one key portion was omitted: the detail on how to attach a strengthening channel to the wall. Despite this, all of the contestants easily determine how the strengthening channel is to be installed (cutting it too long, bending the excess up and screwing it in place). Despite some minor difficulties in aligning the holes in the studs for the channel as well as attaching the stud wall to the room's walls, all of them eventually pass.
- The Drywall: The contestants, after another lesson, must attach drywall to their new stud wall as well as add a coat of plaster. Silent Keith takes the opportunity to nap, as Matt easily passes without his assistance. Cory initially has a scary moment when cutting corner bead almost cost his eye, but afterwards he fails due to mixing his drywall mud by hand instead of using his drill. Angela passes despite her husband, while Deen, after having realized he built his wall three inches too tall for his liking, fails as he runs out of time. For Simon, who chose to close a hole in the wall with his wall, he must also attach a steel mesh to close the sizeable gap between the wall's edge and the wall. When on plastering he realizes that steel mesh is not the most appropriate job, he writes off his challenge, claiming that he would need five coats of plaster instead of the usual three.
- The Frat House Bender: The contestants must bend electrical conduit to form a frame for a chair, before attaching old skateboards to the frame for the seat and back. In addition, the experts' chair can be used as a reference model. Matt chooses to deviate from the design a little, so as to facilitate lap dances and manages (with Linda demonstrating Matt's intent) to pass. Deen also chooses to deviate from the chair entirely, by building a bench. He fails. Cory builds the chair exactly according to the reference model and passes, but he feels somewhat unsatisfied from the ordeal (Cory later attributes this from not getting a lap dance). Simon, who at one point tried to drill a hole with the bit in reverse, fails when he runs out of time. Once again, Angela and Matt's negativity causes the couple to fail.
- The Motorized Shelf: The contestants must install a shelving unit that raises and lowers using an electrical motor. Key to passing is locating the ceiling joists, which Matt finds easily with small drill holes with a screw (instead of a drill bit) after failing to find the joists with a stud finder. Assembly quickly follows and he passes easily. The others, in finding the joists, make much larger holes: Angela and Simon with drywall saws, Deen and Cory with sledgehammers. Because of the cost of repairing the plastered ceiling, the rest fail even if their shelves function. Deen, however, also fails as he decides to cut his mounting bracket, voiding the unit's warranty. Simon fails due to running out of time.
- Group Challenge: The Kitchen Island: Cory's "wolf pack challenge" requires him to lead the group into permanently mounting the kitchen island, adding aluminum sheeting to the framing, and installing the island's plumbing. While Geoff supervises Deen and Simon on cutting the plating (Geoff teaching Deen how to use a metal grinder and reciprocating saw), Andrew teaches Matt how to use plastic plumbing pipes. After a while, he pulls Angela to assist him. Cory's hands-on leadership pays off in spades, as the challenge is finished on time.

In final inspections, Simon admits that nothing worked and that everything is disorganized. Angela is commended for following instructions, while Cory admits he has no excuse for opening up too much of his ceiling, while Deen is taken to task for modifying his lift, with a furious Geoff deeming it unsafe to use and ordering Deen to dismantle it. No serious criticisms were handed to Matt, but Angela is named the most improved over Matt since Matt had arguably done all of his tasks before. As for the worst, for the second episode in succession, the nominees are Simon for once again failing every single challenge and Deen for his mediocre overall standard of work and the dangerous modifications he made to his shelf. In a rare unanimous decision, Simon joins Jeff Gignac from the second season and Joe "The Bullet" Barbaro from the third season as the only nominees in the show's history to be named the worst two episodes in a row (Joe was ultimately named the outright worst at the end of his season). For homework, Simon must give himself a report card on his own progress.

Web extras for this episode:

- Angela and Simon: The Best and the Worst: Angela, in the confessional, comments on how her being the most improved was a shock to her, as she thought highly of everyone else's work. She also mentions how it inspires her to do her best and learn how to do better wolf howls (following the tradition of starting and ending group challenges with a wolf howl, starting with Deen and continuing with Cory). Angela also comments on how Simon deserved to be named the worst with Simon agreeing due to tiring out in the middle of the day. He admits the challenges are easy enough, but he lacks the concentration and focus to do well. On his homework challenge, he gave himself an A+ for working well with a group, though he admitted failing at everything else. He also speaks highly of Andrew and he believes that he is falling short of Andrew's expectations of him.

=== Episode 4: Spark an Interest ===
Original airdate: May 24, 2010

- The Metal Bench: The contestants, after a lesson on how to use an arc welder, must build a bench with the frame consisting of metal tubing. Cory, a mechanic by trade, is experienced with welding, and as such, he passes easily. Simon's frustration with the welding process leads him to get assistance from both Geoff and Cory, but his persistence pays off and he passes. The bench is also not a problem for Matt, as he also passes. Angela starts her cushion before she finishes her frame and fails as the legs are wobbly as a result. Deen fails as his legs fall off and he had injured himself with a stapler while creating the cushion.
- The Window Frame: After Andrew "vandalizes" the glass window above everyone's doors, everyone is taught how to replace the glass on the existing window frame. Deen appeared to not pay attention, but he had in fact paid perfect attention and easily passes. Cory destroys his window frame in the process of removing it and fails as a result. Prior to this challenge, Matt had his helmet modified to include a mohawk by the show's crew in his honour (for passing so many challenges) and his streak of passing continues with this one. Angela fails, as her window glazing is rough in various areas. Simon finishes his window without incident, but he has trouble remounting his window, which has a hinge. That is termed a failure.
- The Disco Ball: The contestants must install a disco ball and laser lights in their rooms. Cory fails due to poor design, along with the fact that his disco ball does not spin. Deen was also a victim of poor planning, as one of his lights missed the disco ball. Angela fails as she sets the lights without mounting them, thus not technically finishing, as her husband Matt points out. As for nominee Matt, he had planned to install a bar in his room and had purchased extra equipment that was not in the shopping list (such as a blender and black lights) to that effect. Along with the disco ball and lights, he also takes the time to install all these things in his new "VIP lounge" under the loft bed. The disco ball and lights also work as intended and easily complement a stripper pole that is to be installed in a later challenge. Simon also passes, though he has a sloppy arrangement for routing all his electrical wires.
- Group Challenge: The Kegerator: Angela leads the wolf pack in creating a kegerator out of an old fridge, as well as installing the island's countertop (including the sink) in this edition of the "wolf pack challenge." While Deen finishes the kitchen backsplash and Matt finishes preparing the countertop for the countertop installation, the other three get started on the kegerator. Though there were a few small mishaps with the kegerator (resulting in Andrew nearly flipping out at Cory for not reading instructions), the kegerator is eventually finished. The same cannot be said of the island, as everyone struggles on the size of hole that needed to be cut for the sink (Simon having accidentally thrown out the template to trace for the right size two episodes ago when Deen had led everyone in framing the island) as well as how to keep the sink in place (as the instructions in doing so was also thrown out). Deen is forced to stop when he is repeatedly shocked after the connection between his angle grinder and an extension cord falls into a puddle of water.

In inspections, Deen is taken to task for his disco ball and frame, which were both incomplete. Angela is also taken to task for arguably doing 95% of all her tasks. Gail complements Matt's room as being "sexier and sexier" every time the experts enter and the same is said for Simon, who at least finished all his challenges. Cory takes pride in his bench with its "extra-curricular" back, but is not as proud of his other failures. The experts are split as to who is the worst: in Gail's eyes, it is Cory for rushing through his work, while Deen is Geoff's choice for the worst due to repeated failures in welding. Andrew does not support either view, instead naming Angela as the episode's worst for not finishing. After being named the worst in back-to-back episodes, Simon, for finishing all his challenges, is named the most improved and the new leader of the wolf pack. For homework, Angela must pick an incomplete challenge and complete it. Angela chooses to complete her bench.

Web extras for this episode:

- Angela and Simon: The Worst and the Best: With the tables turned, Angela and Simon take to the confessionals again. Angela reveals that her bench still has minor imperfections and understands why she had been named the worst, as she had been putting off her projects even though she had the time—exactly what she had been doing at home. Still, she thinks that she is not Canada's Worst Handyman and that there are things worse than not finishing. Simon says that he had not deserved the title of most improved and that he is being set up to look bad for the next episode. However, though he did take pride in his accomplishments, he had believed that he had failed all the challenges in the episode due to workmanship that's not up to his standards. He also thinks that he has much more to prove as the leader of the wolf pack and that regardless of his status, he believes that he is the worst. However, he states the fact that the key to success in the future is calming down and managing himself.

=== Episode 5: Concrete Ideas ===
Original airdate: May 31, 2010

Prior to the show, Linda had told the show staff that she could only stick around for half of rehab. Filling in for her as Simon's nominator is their son, Joey. While Joey is given a warm welcome, Andrew tells viewers that in addition to the experts and the students that will live in the frat house for the upcoming fall semester, Alan Thicke will also inspect each of the contestants' rooms.

- The Concrete Tabletop: The contestants must build a tabletop out of concrete. Instead of being given instructions, however, the contestants must find their own through the internet. Simon and Deen were given computers for this task, while Matt brings in his own laptop and Angela and Cory rely on their nominators' iPhones for their internet. Simon's design is orthodox, but he makes the mistake of adding in steel mesh at the bottom of his concrete pad instead of in the middle, forcing him to add another steel mesh halfway through his concrete pour. Cory, who mistakes cement for concrete (cement is just one of the ingredients in concrete), improvises everything, including his too-tall concrete form. Matt's design is the "desktop bar top," while Deen builds a "hockey rink" complete with goals and a hockey player. Angela chooses an orthodox design, but this irks Matt, as Matt wants Angela to fail: prior to the show, the two had agreed that should Angela be named Canada's Worst Handyman, Angela would stop doing handiwork altogether. Matt seeks to undermine Angela's work in order to make this a reality. The results of all five tabletops, however, will have to wait, as the tabletops must cure overnight.
- The Bike Lift: While the contestants wait for the concrete to cure, the contestants must install a pulley system that can hoist a bike. The point of the challenge is to read instructions. Cory does not do that, instead opting to use the picture on the product packaging as a guide. Predictably, he fails. Deen also fails as one of his ceiling mounts were not fully attached to a joist. Matt takes 30 minutes to pass, making Andrew ask when he had last failed a challenge (over two full episodes ago). Andrew's "hug of encouragement" invigorates Angela to do well more than Matt's antagonism. Despite this, she passes. As for Simon, Joey does most of the heavy lifting, but they still fail as the pulley cord ends up being too short.
- The Concrete Tabletop Redux: The next day, the concrete forms are removed from the tabletops. Deen's and Matt's tabletops come off beautifully and they both pass. Cory's does not come off beautifully at all, his rough edges earning him a failure. Simon's tabletop ends up weighing 300 pounds, meaning that he and Joey have to get help from Matt and Silent Keith to lift it and its excessive weight combined with Simon's failure to read the instructions results in a failure. Angela passes, further distancing Matt from his goal of getting Angela to be named Canada's Worst Handyman.
- Fishing Season: The contestants are given a lesson by Geoff on how to retrofit an electrical outlet and how to make the electrical connection from the new outlet to an existing outlet. The challenge is to do so, in order to install a wall-mounted television. For the second challenge in a row, Matt is done with a pass after 30 minutes. Deen makes the mistake of trying to connect it to a junction box rather than an outlet. After Geoff steps in to convert the junction box into an outlet, he easily passes. Meanwhile, Andrew learns more about Matt and Angela's "pact" and tries to dissuade Matt from further trying to sink Angela (suggesting that while most men would be pleased about their wives doing any handiwork, Matt is displeased over having to do even a small amount). Andrew is somewhat successful in his endeavour and Matt makes a better effort of pitching in. However, he makes the mistake of cutting too large of a hole for the retrofit box and while the electrical outlet itself works, the task is a failure. Cory is temporarily dissuaded from not following the instructions, if only for the fact that the instructions for installing the electrical box is on the box itself, as Geoff points out in the lesson. He passes. Simon also passes after much straining, if only for the fact that he is taking regular breathing exercises taught to him by Andrew.
- Group Challenge: The Kitchen Sink: The wolf pack's tasks include finishing the kitchen backsplash, plumbing the kitchen sink and tiling over a Delta Upsilon emblem with new tile. Though Simon is nominally leader, Matt emerges as a capable second-in-command: he and Angela take charge of the tiling, while Cory gets to the plumbing and Deen with the backsplash. The tile goes along well, but Cory struggles with the plumbing due to not knowing how to solder (despite having asked Matt, who had plumbed most of the kitchen connections so far, for advice); it takes Cory some time to figure out that he had failed to apply flux to his copper, which was causing his leaks, though he manages to finish the plumbing and move on to installing the sink. Meanwhile, Deen's work in cutting more metal for the backsplash hits a snag when his angle grinder breaks down. The sink installation is further hampered by the fact that Simon had unwittingly also thrown out the sink's tiedowns three episodes ago along with the sink's instructions and template; they were finally given to Cory after Andrew had salvaged them from the garbage an episode ago, so that Cory could finally secure the sink in place. Simon's overreliance on Matt proves to be the group's downfall, as an "emergency" caused by Cory testing the sink plumbing sees Matt diverted from his tiling job to investigate a massive basement leak, leaving none of the tasks at hand finished when the three hours are complete. As Simon is visibly shaken by the ordeal (his blood pressure, by his own claim, being sky high), the wolf pack together engage in breathing exercises to calm him down instead of the traditional wolf howl.

In inspections, Simon admits that breathing exercises that Andrew had taught him over the past few episodes has helped to make him more relaxed as well as control his high blood pressure issue. Angela discusses the emotional roller coaster with the experts, with Gail saying that Angela is being "too nice" to Matt. Deen admits that he had lost his focus while the pulley was being installed, while Cory is taken to task for not following instructions, as he admits that he likes to do things using trial and error (he tells the experts, "Once you figure it out your own way, then you know how to do it perfect next time.", prompting Andrew to reply, "Once you read the instructions, you know how to do it perfect the first time."). Matt, who has been keeping pace with the experts, makes small talk with them during inspections (Gail asking him if he had, in high school, passed as often as he did in rehab, to which Matt replies in the negative, as he had graduated from high school roughly three years earlier). In the end, Matt's continuing streak of passed challenges, which had earlier earned him the nickname of "golden boy," earns him the golden hard hat for the most improved. As for the worst, Gail claims that Cory is the worst, as his work has been getting worse rather than improving, but Geoff adds that it is even worse when someone is making a bad handyman worse. As such, Angela's husband, Matt, is named the worst of the episode, the first time any nominator has been named as such in the history of the series. Furthermore, behind Matt's photo is a TV with a live feed to the nominators' green room, so the contestants can see his reaction. For Matt's homework, Matt has to open a healthier dialogue with Angela and agree to better work together.

Web extras for this episode:

- A Surprise Worst Handyman This Week: Matt, Angela's husband, takes to the confessional booth and says that it was not surprising that he was named the worst, but it was surprising that his words could be so hurtful. Andrew's words, in particular, during the electrical challenge, was said to have been particularly profound, as he had realized at that point that he was part of Angela's problem. Matt, the contestant, also takes to the confessional, on how he had not expected to be named the most improved despite working 110%. The biggest lesson of this episode, in his opinion, is to slow down and think things through before taking action.

=== Episode 6: Building Breakdowns ===
Original airdate: June 7, 2010

- The Food Cabinets: The contestants must build a cabinet using a router and dado joints and attach a laminate cover to their main food preparation surface. Deen proves to be a natural at cabinet making... right until realizing he mismeasured the width of his bar fridge, making it so that the fridge does not fit in his cabinet. After Doug guides him to a fix, he passes, but takes to the confessional and admits that it felt to him like he was cheating. The others are not as fortunate: for Cory, poor joinery results in the cabinets falling apart, resulting in failure. Angela also fails due to her increasing pile of incomplete projects diverting her time. For Matt and Simon, they also fail due to not adhering to the instructions for the contact cement that attaches the laminate to the cabinet (Matt's first since the Cabinet Challenge in Episode 2), ending his streak of challenge passes (not counting the group challenges).
- The Frat House Bender, Part Two: The contestants must take a piece of clear acrylic and bend it in order to turn it into a side table. Deen chooses to not use the acrylic to make an end table at all, opting to use it as boards for his hockey rink wall. Despite not bending acrylic at all, he passes (leading to an impromptu mock hockey fight between himself and Andrew). Matt and Cory find the challenge to be quite easy—so easy that even Silent Keith (nicknamed as such as he is a man of few words) breaks his silence and speaks, much to Andrew's shock. Both pass (though Cory admits that his table has a few imperfections). Angela also passes with husband Matt's support, taking so much pride in it that she wants to take the table home with her. As for Simon, frustration with the heat gun and later the blowtorch causes him to melt the acrylic and fail.
- The Snowboard Shelf: The contestants must take four snowboards and build a shelf out of them. Each contestant is given at random one of five different shelf designs, which they must follow. Angela's shelves are assembled with threaded rods, Cory's shelves are ceiling mounted, Simon's shelves are a corner unit that is supported with threaded rods on one side and a board on the other, Deen's a "pagoda-style" unit and Matt's design is a more conventional shelf supported by wood and dado joints on both sides. Cory is initially frustrated with the fact that his shelves run perpendicular to how the ceiling joists are run. He uses one snowboard as strapping, but hanging the other three snowboards causes him to get frustrated and fail. Angela fails after trying to notch the room's baseboards with a chainsaw near an electrical outlet in order to make room for the lowest shelf, though her shelf is also not attached to the wall. Deen, after staring at a "dry fit" for some time and not noticing that one shelf bows as a result, manages to fix his error and finish his shelf without Doug's assistance. As for Matt, he uses his snowboards upside down for his shelves, which promptly earns him a fail when his shelves start to bow under a weight test. Simon had arguably the most complicated design, but he manages, with Joey's assistance, to guide it to a pass.
- Group Challenge: The Kitchen Continues: Right off the top, Matt assigns four tasks to each of the others: Deen is to finish the diamond plating he has been working on for several episodes, Simon is to build and attach the sink cabinet doors, Angela is to finish cutting tiles for the Delta Upsilon emblem, while Cory is to install a new range hood. Cory does not read the instructions all the way, and installs the range hood too high (as Ontario building codes set a maximum height difference between stove top and range hood); to compensate, he decides to build a platform. Deen diverts some of his time to assist Matt in plumbing the dishwasher, as he wants to learn how to do plumbing back home. He is then tasked to finish the remainder of the plumbing while Matt himself switches gears to tiling with Angela. The tile job proves to be difficult due to Matt using too much adhesive, making a mess out of the "Delta" tiles in the Delta Upsilon logo as the adhesive comes up between the tiles. Matt's demand for perfection, however, meant that he wants to start the tile job over. As for Simon's task, he takes over 90 minutes in repeatedly installing and uninstalling doors that do not fit due to the openings being unlevel and not plumb. In the end, none of the major tasks are completed.

In inspections, Angela is taken to task for the shelves and the food table, but is commended for the side table. Cory admits that his food cabinet is a "work in progress" before Gail retorts that it is "progressing to the dumpster," while Geoff tells Cory to anchor his shelf. Matt points out his shortcomings on both the food cabinet and shelves, admitting that he did not "overthink" enough (and that his recent string of passes that were broken by his two failures this episode was due to "overthinking"), underestimating the challenge's difficulty. Both Deen and Simon were commended for their jobs well done—Deen for his cabinet and Simon for his shelf. Ultimately, Simon wins the golden hard hat a second time due to his project being more difficult. As for who the worst is, Geoff names Cory as the worst for his attitude and the fact that his projects (including the platform for the stove) were hazards, while Gail picks Matt as the worst for letting his standards slip and leading the group project to what Geoff describes as "the worst project he's ever seen." This leaves Andrew to cast the deciding vote and he ultimately sides with Geoff and Cory, who only avoided being named the worst last episode due to Angela's husband, Matt, always being negative and, in Geoff's own words, making a bad handyman worse, is named the worst for this episode. For homework, Cory must open up about his attitude to Andrew as a measure to keep it under control.

Web extras for this episode:

- Geoff and Gail Make a Desk: In a first for the series, Geoff and Gail demonstrate how they built a concrete countertop. Portions of this video were shown in the previous episode.

=== Episode 7: The Lone Wolf ===
Original airdate: June 14, 2010

- The Biometric Deadbolt: The contestants must install a deadbolt lock with a biometric sensor to the doors of their rooms. For Matt, who lives in rural Nova Scotia, he would prefer having a traditional key and he found the installation particularly frustrating, though he does pass. Cory ardently reads the instructions, and despite some trouble programming the door, he passes. Deen fails as he installs the door backwards (with the lock side in), while Angela fails due to realizing that her chosen location is opposite a weak part of the doorjamb and must drill a hole at another location. Simon fails after some frustration with the installation.
- Group Challenge: The Kitchen's Final Touches: Simon and the wolf pack must finish the kitchen. He tasks Matt to handle dishwasher installation, Angela with putting grout on the tiles, Cory with redoing the range hood vent and Deen with the island doors. While Matt and Cory eventually help each other through their jobs (including removing the pedestal that the stove was installed on after the last group challenge, but not before Simon installed a smaller pedestal as a step next to it), Deen manages to make the same mistakes as Simon when he tried to install the doors the last group challenge, though he does manage to finish. Angela uses an extensive array of tools to clean the mortar (though the tiles eventually are cleaned) before installing the grout, which was mixed too thin (Simon having confused pint, the US customary system measure, for pinte, the French term for litre). As for Simon himself, he wanders about aimlessly trying to assist Angela. After a few finishing touches on the last day, the kitchen is finished, though Simon admits that it was due to the others' work ethics and not his leadership.
- The List: The contestants have two days to finish any previously incomplete challenges. At the end of the list is "bonus," for any final touches that contestants will need for their rooms. Angela's back had given out an hour into the group challenge and she takes the rest of the day off to recover, though she maintains that she will be okay in time for the last day. Her room, however, does not go untouched: Matt, whose to-do list was short enough that he could afford to defer the paint and "bonus" (his stripper pole) to the last day, rallies everyone else to help finish her room. Simon, who has the longest to-do list out of the contestants, declines in order to make time for his room (which includes finishing his concrete tabletop and the skateboard chair). Before assisting Matt with finishing Angela's room, Cory and Deen also make progress on their rooms—Cory by covering the large ceiling hole he had left during the motorized lift challenge with a sheet of melamine and Deen by doing the acrylic table challenge with a new piece of acrylic as well as installing the pulley system that had fallen apart. The next day, after a quick cleaning of the kitchen, Angela returns to her room, expecting it to have been left untouched, but finding that it is, for all intents and purposes, finished; all Angela needs to do is decorate.

An hour before the rooms are finished, the frat boys who will be staying in the contestants' rooms, accompanied by Patrick Knight, president of Delta Upsilon's London chapter, show up early to inspect each room. Matt's room, the Gentleman's Club, easily impressed the frat boys—David, the owner of the room, in particular. Angela's "Girly Room" is less impressive in the frat boys' eyes; the criticisms of her room were close to personal in nature, but she easily silences her critics after a snappy retort on their fashion sense. Simon's room, the Golf Room, will be occupied by Aaron, who is an avid golfer like Simon. After trying out the golf green on the floor (and discovering that the cup Simon installed for his room does not fit), Aaron decides he hates the room. Simon seems to agree, calling the frat boys' rating of a 3/10 "too generous." Cory's room, the Car Room, is given a lukewarm reception, though the only major complaint is that the seat on his bar stool isn't fastened, to which Cory admits that he forgot about it in the rush to complete his other projects. Finally, Deen's room, the Hockey Room, is looked down upon by the frat boys, due to Deen's wall being too flimsy and giving the appearance of a smaller room, with Andrew also taking issue with Deen's attempts to boast about his work on jobs (the bed, in particular) that were actually finished mostly by Doug.

In the end, the frat boys are divided on whose room and, by extension, which contestant is the worst—Deen (hearing Deen's story of how he had drawn blood during the Metal Bench Challenge in Episode 4) or Simon (who had the least work done), though most seemed to agree that Deen's room was worse. Alan Thicke, who had been watching the progress of each room throughout the season, gives the dissenting viewpoint that Simon's room is worse than Deen's. An hour later, the experts give their final assessments. As everyone had pointed out the previous day (and for most of the season), Matt is clearly not the worst, with his work being agreed to be perhaps the best in the entire history of the show. The experts had agreed beforehand that Angela would be exempted from consideration as the worst (due to her injury and her husband, Matt, being agreed to be more at fault for the bad work that she did do), but even then, her work is still felt to be of a very solid quality overall and both she and Matt agree that the experience has been worthwhile if only for the improvement in their marriage. Cory is also agreed to have done more than enough to avoid being named the worst and the experts tell him that if he keeps his attitude in check and remembers to follow instructions, he can become even better. As was obvious to everyone, the worst is either Deen or Simon. Deen appears to be confident of his chances in avoiding being Canada's Worst Handyman (though Andrew warns him of being overconfident), as he had declared his room finished 30 minutes before the others, while leaving serious mistakes unaddressed. Simon admits to a lack of focus and admits to his shortfalls. The experts' deliberation is not shown, but in the end, Deen, the only nominee who had not been named the worst in any particular episode, is ultimately named Canada's Worst Handyman after being frequently injured due to doing things in an unsafe manner throughout rehab. As he hoists the wolf-shaped Canada's Worst Handyman trophy, everyone else gives him one final wolf howl in his honour.

Web extras for this episode:

- Yup, Deen's the Worst: Deen, in the confessional, is exasperated that he was named Canada's Worst Handyman. He speaks about how the feeling has not yet sunk in and is defiant to the end, believing that his room was the best.

== Reception ==
Canada's Worst Handyman 5 has been a ratings success for Discovery Channel, with a record 500,000 viewers tuning in on its first airing, more than any other non-sports show on a specialty channel airing on the same day.
