= Canada's Worst Handyman 4 =

- Season 4
- Starring: Andrew Younghusband
- No. of episodes: 7

Release
- Original network: Discovery Channel Canada
- Original release: May 4 – June 15, 2009

Season chronology
- ← Previous; Canada's Worst Handyman 3 Next → Canada's Worst Handyman 5

Canada's Worst Handyman 4 was the fourth season of the Canadian reality TV show Canada's Worst Handyman, which aired on the Discovery Channel. As with previous years, five people, nominated by their family or friends, enter the Handyman Rehabilitation Centre to improve their handyman skills. This year, the Handyman Rehabilitation Centre is located at the Pow Wow Point Lodge, a 100-year-old country retreat near Huntsville, Ontario, where each contestant competes in challenges meant to improve their do-it-yourself skills, including one where all the contestants must work together as a group. At the end of each episode, host Andrew Younghusband and two judges determine the most improved and the worst contestant in each episode: the most improved being rewarded with the responsibility in leading the next episode's group challenges, while the worst being punished with a further one-on-one tutorial with Andrew. At the end of the last episode, the worst of the five contestants is named Canada's Worst Handyman. This is the first season in which Canadian Tire is the primary sponsor. Furthermore, unlike previous seasons, contestants will not be given the materials or tools that they need: instead, they must purchase them from a Canadian Tire store near the rehab centre while keeping under budget. The overall theme to this season is the question of what is considered "good enough," in addition to working outdoors in the cold winter (Canada's Worst Handyman has been filmed in the winter since the second season, but was held primarily indoors in previous seasons).

== Experts ==
- Gail Prosser-Craig is the owner of "Women Who Build Stuff," a renovation company exclusively staffed by women. Her company's projects can be seen all over the Greater Toronto Area. She replaces Jo Alcorn, who served as the series' interior designer in the previous season.
- Geoff Woodmansey is back for his second season as general contractor. As the owner of his own construction company, he has had over 25 years of experience under his belt, working in some of Toronto's most exclusive neighborhoods.

== Contestants ==
- Johnnie Bachusky, from Red Deer, Alberta, is a columnist with the Red Deer Express newspaper and book author (mainly on ghost towns in and around Alberta) who, as a handyman, has a fear of following directions—so much so that his wife, Darlis, does everything around the house, similar to that of Marnie Vinet from the previous season.
- Angie Budgell, from Minto, New Brunswick, is a stay-at-home mom whose high spirits and attitude are in stark contrast to her clumsiness. Her husband and nominator, Roy, is a perfectionist who simply wants things done properly.
- Brian McDonald, from Sarnia, Ontario, is a Canadian Coast Guard officer whose family of five must constantly put up with his "Do Not Use" labels all over his house, all from do-it-yourself projects—a habit his wife and nominator, Veronica, brought him to the Handyman Rehabilitation Centre to end.
- Brian Pugh, a retired stockbroker from Ottawa, Ontario, claims to be "dyslexic" when it comes to directions, buying by two or three times the materials he actually needs for his projects. His son, Brennan, nominated him to bring his spending and skills under control.
- Eric Thibeault, a registered nurse from Gatineau, Quebec, is easily excitable, but carries with him a hot temper. His childhood buddy, Marc Buzzell, brought him to the Handyman Rehabilitation Centre to bring it under control. However, partway through the fifth episode, the producers decided that Marc was too much of a distraction for Eric to work or learn effectively and thus, replaced him with Eric's wife, Michelle Lacroix.

== Synopsis ==
| Contestant (with hard hat colour) | Nominator | 1 | 2 | 3 | 4 | 5 | 6 | 7 |
|---|---|---|---|---|---|---|---|---|
| Johnnie | Darlis | IMP | WORST | IN | IN | M/W | IN | CWH |
| Angie | Roy | IN | IMP | WORST | IN | IN | IMP | IN |
| Brian M. | Veronica | IN | IN | IMP | IN | IN | IN | IN |
| Eric | Marc/Michelle | IN | IN | IN | IN | IN | WORST | IN |
| Brian P. | Brennan | WORST | IN | WORST | EXPL | | | |

CWH – The contestant is Canada's Worst Handyman.
WORST – The contestant is the worst of the episode.
IN – The contestant was considered for the worst for this episode.
M/W – The contestant was named both the most improved and the worst for this episode.
IMP – The contestant is the most improved of the episode.
EXPL – The contestant was expelled from the Handyman Rehabilitation Centre and is out of the running for Canada's Worst Handyman.

=== Episode 1: Wilderness Lodge ===
Original airdate: May 4, 2009

The contestants arrive at the Handyman Rehabilitation Centre, a 100-year-old lodge in the Muskokas. Having arrived at "Canada's Worst Lodge," the handymen and their nominators pick out their rooms: Johnnie in red, Brian M. in pink, Eric in blue and Brian P. in yellow. Angie, left without a room on the second floor of the building with the other four, is given the green room on the ground floor. However, each contestant discovers that the doors have been barricaded with barrels, which only need a gentle but sustained push to move aside. Nevertheless, Johnnie and both Brians use hard body checks to get in, damaging their doors. Inside each room lies a binder, detailing the 23 challenges they will do and the materials they need for each.

- Shopping: At the local Canadian Tire store, the contestants have two hours and $4,000 to locate and purchase the 269 items that will be needed for their 23 challenges ahead. While Johnnie frets about finding vice grips (despite it being one of the first things that he puts in his cart), Eric proceeds calmly. Brian P., however, manages to only buy just over half of the items needed (149/269), including only buying 3.5-inch framing nails (intending to cut them shorter as needed) instead of nails and screws of all sizes. Though heavily assisted by their nominators, Brian M. (211/269), Angie (200/269) and Johnnie (174/269) also finish, but miss out on a significant number of items (though Angie is well under budget due to having found many of her items on sale). Eric fails to purchase only eight items.
- Home Challenge: The traditional home challenge, done by each nominee before entering rehab, is to build an object 60 cm tall that will support their own weight from a sheet of plywood and several pieces of lumber. Johnnie intended to build a table using the plywood as his top, but settles on a piece of lumber with four legs side-by-side. It does not hold his weight. Brian P. manages to waste his lumber, accidentally destroying one piece while trying to "cut" it by stamping on it, using most of the remaining pieces to needlessly reinforce the plywood, and then wasting another piece by cutting it into small blocks and nailing them together. This leaves him with just one piece to build the legs and he fails as the resulting table is too short. Angie also builds a table, but accidentally nails a piece of lumber to the table while upside-down and has to spend some time removing it. While her effort ends up being the best of the five, the table is still very crooked and of questionable quality. Brian M. decides on a table with "linear tripod" legs, which does support his weight, though is considered a failure because of how unstable it would be. Eric eschews the plywood entirely and simply builds scaffolding from the lumber; not only does this require both Eric and Marc to climb on at the same time in order to balance it, the scaffold collapses almost immediately under the weight of the two men. Needless to say, Eric fails.
- Shelving: Meeting the experts for the first time, the experts show the handymen how to build shelves for their closet so that they can put away their tools. Prior to the challenge, however, Angie and Eric agree to switch rooms (Angie now has the blue and Eric the green room), as Angie dislikes the downstairs room. Johnnie and Brian M. manage to finish correctly without involving their nominators. Eric measures meticulously, but fails as he failed to account for his slanted floor, leaving his shelves unlevel. Angie also fails, from having cut her shelving boards too long and measuring levelness by eye. Brian P. fails to finish in the allotted time, due to not even touching his power tools.
- Group Challenge: The Bar Table: The contestants gather together to build a bar table in the style of an existing 100-year-old desk. Brian P. quickly takes charge and insists on overbuilding his bar table (with eight legs instead of four, each made of 4x4 posts, as well as largely redundant supports). After some input from the others, the table quickly goes up and passes the test.

In the final evaluation, Johnnie admits that he is not a master of organization, as his purchased supplies are still all over the floor instead of being in his closet. However, by virtue of passing his first challenge despite knowing nothing about handiwork, he is given the golden helmet for the most improved for the episode. Angie is applauded for quickly organizing her room (she credits it to her maternal instincts due to being a mother of four). Brian M. apologizes for damaging his door, while Eric is led into his former room, as he had damaged the radiator in Angie's bathroom, which would have caused a lethal electrical hazard were the power connected, causing Geoff to nominate him as the episode's worst. However, Gail and Andrew decide that the worst in the episode is Brian P.: before the first challenge, Brian P. had demolished his bathroom sink to get a head start on the next episode's demolition challenge, but had caused a water leak that is starting to drip into the common area on the floor below (Gail also notes that he had not attempted to use any of his new tools, relying on what he knew coming into rehab). As Brian P. hangs his head in shame underneath the fireplace's "Not Good Enough" banner, he solicits Brian M.'s help in securing it in place. As his extra punishment, Brian P. must repair the leak. During this time, he regales Andrew of his past as a stock broker, where he was given the nickname of "Brain" by his peers for his skills in the market, but the nickname of "Brain Damaged" by his wife for his skills (or lack thereof) in handiwork.

=== Episode 2: Down the Drain ===
Original airdate: May 11, 2009

- Demolition: The second day of rehab begins with the handymen demolishing the bathroom. This includes removing the sink and vanity, the toilet and the shower fixtures. Angie opts to smash her toilet apart after giving up with dealing with two rusted bolts attaching the toilet to the floor and pressures Johnnie to do the same. Angie also smashes her shower fixtures apart with a sledgehammer. Johnnie also smashes apart a light socket, a mirror and his sink, but admits smashing the fixtures apart may have helped him overcome his fear of tools. Brian M. removes his toilet without draining the tank or removing the tank from the seat, causing water to leak down to the floor below. Brian P. saws off the shutoff to his sink, as well as most of his shower fixtures. Eric is the only contestant to finish correctly, having opted to remove the toilet before the sink (unlike the others).
- The Workbench: The traditional workbench challenge this year is to assemble the workbench they had purchased; this causes Brian P. to immediately fail, as he did not buy one (though curiously, he did buy an electric razor). He had intended to build one, but did not do so during this challenge. Brian M. manages to pass after fighting with the instructions, while Angie's anger manages to force her husband Roy off the job. Eric mistakenly disassembles one of the parts needed to assemble the workbench, while Johnnie's workbench remains incomplete after becoming frustrated.
- The Wall: During the demolition challenge, two of the bedroom's walls were also taken down. In its place on one of them will be a faux log finish. To do this, foam must be applied onto the wall before the faux wall pieces (roughly-hewn lumber) are attached. Then, parging must be used to fill the gaps between the wall pieces. Neither Eric nor Brian P. had managed to buy the washers needed to attach the foam to the wall (Brian P. also lacked screws); they make do with construction adhesive instead. At the start of Day 3, Brian M. threatens to leave rehab over the fact that he was not taught the use of a table saw or chop saw—even though neither are necessary for the project—and are not used by anyone else. The shouting match between Brian M. and Andrew gets so intense, Eric (working within earshot) forces both to shut up, telling them that they were being a distraction to him. Despite all the distractions, Eric, though, passes this challenge. Angie fails due to having assembled her log pieces vertically (leaving nothing to support the parging; upon that realization, she opts to use spray foam insulation instead), as does Johnnie. The Brians both fail due to having large gaps in their log pieces (Brian M. also getting the cement-based parging all over his wood), so much so that parging will never cover the foam adequately.
- The Bathroom Floor: With the bathroom fixtures removed, the next task is to put new vinyl floors onto the bathroom. Brian M. and Johnnie manage to fail by applying adhesive all over the floor, leaving the task to adhere the vinyl to the floor difficult (as they would have large air bubbles and get adhesive all over their new floor). Johnnie also had fitted his bathroom with two pieces instead of one, having mismeasured. Angie also failed due to having mismeasured, while Brian P. gave up after cutting a small piece for the area around the toilet before realizing that the entire room must be done with one piece of vinyl. He swears never to lay another floor by himself again. Eric took the time to assemble his air compressor and nail down a subfloor, but the subfloor was too flimsy and it left him no time to start doing the vinyl floor.
- Group Challenge: The Roof Floor: The overbuilt bar table the previous episode was, in fact, one of the parts needed to build an ice fishing hut. Each of the seemingly-unrelated group challenges will be building another part of that hut; the hut itself will be assembled outdoors in the final group challenge. After Johnnie is ostensibly given a private lesson on how to lay a frame in order to put a floor on it, he leads the others in making two such floors, which will become the two roof pieces in their hut. At the beginning, Johnnie splits the other four into two groups: Brian P. and Eric assembles one frame, while Angie and Brian M. assembles the other. Angie's cutting without measuring contrasts that with Brian M.'s careful and meticulous approach, while Eric's insistence on using power tools was in sharp contrast to Brian P., who insists on not using them. Both were slowed down due to these and other factors so much so that after three hours, the experts are forced to step in and help Johnnie lead the two groups to finish 20 minutes later.

At the final deliberations, Geoff puts Johnnie as his candidate for being worst due to having finished nothing and forcing the experts to intervene in the group challenge. Andrew, however, picks Brian M. to be the worst because of his wall. In the end, though, the fact that Brian M. managed to salvage his bathroom floor in his spare time made the difference, as it saved him from being named the worst; in his own words, Johnnie went "from hero to goat." On the other hand, Angie did find time to finish her workbench and the mistake in the bathroom floor could be easily overlooked. Though she did smash her way out of demolition, she did manage to finish all the challenges, so she is named the most improved. Johnnie's extra lesson was the use of the chop saw.

=== Episode 3: Common Sense ===
Original airdate: May 18, 2009

Day 4 at the Handyman Rehabilitation Centre starts with a lesson on using a chain saw, though it is not used in any of the challenges to come.

- Log Lamps: The contestants must build a lamp out of a log and a lamp kit. Eric does this with no issues, while Angie forgets to drill a hole at the base of the lamp for the power cord, instead crushing the power cord between the log the base of the lamp. Johnnie takes over 15 minutes to drill a hole in the lamp for the power wires, only to realize that his bit was too small. This, combined with the fact that his light fixture was installed backwards and his bad wiring electrocutes Andrew, causes him to fail. Brian M. fails when he pulls his drill apart while trying to remove it from the log and it is not shown if he finishes or repairs his drill. Brian P.'s lamp causes the lights in his room to short out, because he crossed the wires. Frustrated with the installation, Johnnie declares himself the worst of the episode.
- Electric Fireplace: The contestants must assemble an electric fireplace kit that they have bought. Eric had mistakenly bought an electric stove instead of an electric fireplace; one was provided for him so he would not fail the challenge. Eric assembles it with no major issues. Brian M. fails in frustration, largely over the fact that his fireplace kit was more complex and had more parts than the others. Angie assembles the kit, but fails for missing some steps; she mentions to Roy repeatedly that "some people were just born without common sense," but ends the challenge by planning on hanging the fireplace on the wall. Brian P. fails the challenge because Brennan did most of the work, while Johnnie assembles the frame to his fireplace upside-down.
- The Dimmer Switch: The contestants must replace the light switch for their room with a dimmer switch. This goes without trouble for Eric, Angie and Brian M. (Angie even stating that it was a job that she would do herself instead of delegating the job to Roy, as it was back home). Johnnie's dimmer switch does not dim or turn off, because he wired the two wall wires into a closed circuit, instead of to the switch. Brian P.'s loose connections and failure to properly ground his switch result in him shorting out the circuit in his room again.
- Installing the Toilet: The contestants must install a new toilet where the old one was removed. Eric agrees with the experts that this is the "easiest challenge" on the show: after finishing his subfloor, he quickly installs the toilet and passes, calling the challenge so easy he would volunteer to replace the toilet for everyone else. The other four, however, are not so lucky: due to buying cheaper toilets, none of them had bolts that attached the toilet to the toilet flange (they were provided so that the four could finish the challenge). Johnnie had the additional task of cleaning the gunk in his toilet pipes after smashing his toilet apart two days ago, while Brian P. also had the additional task of repairing his toilet flange after accidentally destroying it. Angie and Brian M. manage to finish (though Brian M. was not too confident about his work and forgot to empty the toilet before removing it) with varying degrees of "wobbliness" (though wobbly installations was not a factor in overall grades, both passed). Johnnie forgets to install his bolts and his toilet is not attached to the floor. Brian P. over-tightens the screws holding the toilet to the wall, leading to a massive fracture in the tank, though he contends the base was installed properly.
- Group Challenge: The Window: The next part of the ice shed to be built is a frame for a window, to be led by Angie. After Angie is given a private lesson on framing and the dimensions for the challenge, she puts Brian M. to work as the "measurer," Brian P. and Eric as the "cutters" and herself and Johnnie as the "assemblers." However, it quickly becomes apparent that Brian P. could not measure angles (and tries to silence Brian M when he tries to put in his opinion) and the fact that things would go faster if Johnnie (who had set up the chop saw that he learned two days ago in his extra lesson) was doing the cutting (as he could cut faster than either Brian P. or Eric with circular saws). Despite Brian M. being the measurer, the entire group was slowed down due to mismeasurement (largely due to the group having ignored him); it takes the entire group four hours to finish the frame to Angie's specifications. Johnnie notes after the challenge that back home, a contractor he had hired took four hours to assemble an entire shed.

In the individual evaluations, Johnnie declares himself to be the worst, off of a series of bad challenges; his lamp, by his own admission, was a write-off. Angie was criticized for her leadership (she had nearly quit the challenge) as well as the lamp. Eric was critically treated in his wobbly toilet installation, while Brian P. was brought to task on the toilet tank (which was leaking "like a tap" upon closer inspection). For installing his toilet correctly and in deference to the fact that he has no working toilets back home, Brian M. is named the most improved. As for the worst, Gail contends that Angie had led her team to the ground in the group challenge (calling Brian M. a more competent leader even though he was ignored), while Geoff contends that Brian P. is the worst for having still not passed a single challenge and for being a disruptive influence in this (and the previous) episode's group challenge. The experts were indecisive, so when Andrew reveals the worst of the day (Brian P. quickly raises his arms in defeat), the photo is one of "Brangie": half Brian P. and half Angie (the only time in the series' history where two contestants were named the worst in the same episode). As Brian P. and Angie both hang their heads in shame, their extra challenge is the "common sense test" of trying to fit square pegs into round holes. As Brian P. manages to force a peg in with a hammer, Angie, who was named the most improved in the previous episode for finishing all the challenges, comments that, indeed, "some people are just born without common sense."

=== Episode 4: Off Its Hinges ===
Original airdate: May 25, 2009

- The Medicine Cabinet: The handymen must build and mount a medicine cabinet of their own design, with the restriction that it must be installed in their bathroom, with a mirror on the cabinet door. Angie had not bought a mirror, so she had chosen to salvage the existing mirror on Day 2. However, she fails because her cabinet, once mounted, fails to close. Brian P. fails due to his shelves being unlevel, while Johnnie fails as his mirror, a large ornamental piece, falls off as he opens the cabinet. Eric arguably has the best cabinet, but he fails to mount it. Brian M. eventually passes, even though in his own words, it took him three hours to do a 90-minute job.
- Drywalling: The contestants must drywall their remaining exposed wall. All five handymen chose to install their drywall vertically, rather than horizontally. Angie and Eric pass, despite not meeting Ontario building codes on the number of screws, while Brian M. fails when he decides to have his drywall seams straddling his electrical outlets. Brian P. only installs two pieces of drywall (one of them backwards) before giving up. Johnnie fails over the frustration caused when he accidentally covers an electrical outlet and is forced to take the large piece down; he then angrily tries to blame Darlis for his failure, causing her to storm out of the room in disgust. As the challenge finishes, Johnnie and Brian P. both declare themselves the worst.
- Antler Racks: The handymen must build something not even the experts have tried: a coat hanger out of deer antlers. In a change of pace, Brian P. is the first to finish, mostly because he opted to glue his antlers on with industrial-strength adhesive instead of screwing them in, but he fails as the antlers droop. Angie, complaining that drilling through the antlers smelled of burnt turkey, manages to pass her "turkelicious" rack. Johnnie fails as he realizes he has mounted his antlers upside-down, while Brian M. also manages to fail as he has only secured his antlers with one screw, causing the antlers to swivel when a coat is hung on it. Eric's coat rack is the most complex of the nominees; his, like the experts and unlike his fellow handymen, is a standalone rack rather than wall-mounted and uses four antlers instead of two. He manages to pass, with his decision to buy several power tools which were not originally called for proving fortuitous; after some training from Andrew they greatly speeded up his work on his stand.
- Group Challenge: The Three Doors: The second week of rehab begins with the next part of the ice hut, which is three doors mounted on a frame: a Z-door, a plywood door, and a foam-core door (the latter two half the height). Brian M., after being given a private lesson on the various types of doors and the hinges needed to hang them, tasks Brian P. and Angie to the Z-door, Eric to the foam-core door and Johnnie to the plywood door. While Eric and Johnnie proceed without issues, Brian P.'s insistence on using hand tools (including using a table saw as a sawhorse while he uses a hand saw to cut lumber, instead of using the table saw itself to cut it) causes him to mismeasure repeatedly, delaying the construction of the Z-door, as well as cut his hand with a saw blade. Frustrations, which have built up over this and the last group challenge (Brian P. and Eric had threatened to mutiny in the previous group challenge, while Angie had quit her foreman position), finally causes the project to end in a fail, as the handymen are unable to hang the doors correctly.

As the handymen break for lunch, the handymen all criticize Brian M.'s style of leadership: though Brian M. tries to carry a positive attitude, everyone else criticizes him for interfering too much with their assigned tasks. Andrew indicates that over lunch, while Angie, Eric and Johnnie opted to move on from the criticisms of Brian M., Brian P. wouldn't and, to his face, makes a threatening statement in front of the others (which was not repeated). Andrew only states that "what Brian P. says next is not suitable for a Discovery Channel show about handiwork. All you need to know about what was said is that the rest of Canada's Worst Handymen no longer want to work with Brian P." The comment is not taken lightly by the other four nominees, who all agree that, even though Brian M. interfered too much with their assigned tasks, Brian P. crossed the line and, in the privacy room after lunch, are now calling for Brian P.'s removal from the Handyman Rehabilitation Centre over the remark. Despite having actually sided with Brian P. in the argument against Brian M. (and despite the fact he lives just across the Ottawa River from Brian P.), Eric states, "Get him out of here, right? 'Cuz there's no room for that." (Despite initially siding with Brian P.) Brian M., whose style of leadership was what he got criticized for by the others (and subsequently led to Brian P.'s threat), states, "Unacceptable... cart him away." Johnnie states, "This guy can't stay." Angie, who was named joint-worst with Brian P. in the previous episode for her poor performance in the Group Challenge (as Gail so eloquently pointed out in individual evaluations), states, "I think his leaving would be a wise decision." The episode ends without neither an expert evaluation nor verdict, as a visibly and audibly shaken Andrew informs Brian P. that he is required to leave: "So, that concludes our fourth episode here at the Handyman Rehabilitation Centre and this is the part of the show where I usually talk about who is the worst and who is the most improved, but let's just bypass that today and I'll talk a little bit about why we're actually here and that's for one reason and one reason only and that's to make you people better handymen. That's it. So to make sure we all remain focused on the handiwork, quite simply, Brian P., we're going to ask you to leave." Brian P. responds with "Thank God for that! Not a fucking problem" as he storms out. After this, he was never mentioned again. As explained by Andrew, no one is named most improved or worst and Brian P. becomes the first contestant ever removed from any Worst Handyman series. The incident brought an unusually serious sense of tense drama to what was an otherwise humorous, lighthearted show featuring clumsy and troubled handymen as they struggle to improve themselves and not be named Canada's Worst Handyman. Brian P.'s expulsion also made him statistically the worst handyman in the show's history, having failed every single challenge during the four episodes he participated in (every other candidate passed at least one challenge during the first four episodes of any given season, including the nominees who were ultimately named Canada's Worst Handyman in their respective seasons, despite being named the most improved at least once-- Keith Cole, Terry Cress and Joe "The Bullet" Barbaro).

=== Episode 5: Roll Out the Barrels ===
Original airdate: June 1, 2009

The episode begins with Andrew condemning Brian P.'s room with caution tape.

- Shutoff Valves: After a lesson by Geoff on compression fittings, the contestants must install shutoff valves on the plumbing fixtures of their bathroom sinks. Eric does so with no difficulty, while Angie and Brian M. fail to tighten their valves. Johnnie has a much more complicated challenge than everyone else, as he inadvertently fractured the water pipes during Episode 2, forcing him to remove the old pipes and solder in new ones. He actually manages this successfully, but fails to attach the shutoff valves, first attaching them too loosely and then accidentally disassembling them altogether.
- Tub Surround: The contestants must install plastic that is to surround their shower. Brian M. is motivated to succeed, as he lacks a shower at home, but fails as he does not apply enough adhesive. Eric, believing instructions are "for low-IQ people," is forced to eat his words after his plastic comes off, all from not reading the instructions on the adhesive. Angie fails as she had to repair the plumbing on her tub (caused by smashing her tub fixtures on Demolition Day); she did not have time to start the installation. Johnnie fails as he failed to adhere one piece to the wall.
- Plastering: The contestants must apply the first of three coats of their plastered wall. This is not an issue for Eric. For Angie, she fails as she prefers to apply the plaster with her finger. Johnnie fails due to not having addressed the plethora of raised screwheads on the wall, while Brian M. fails after covering every screw hole with mesh tape, even those not between drywall sheets.
- Group Challenge: The Pool Table: Because of the last episode having no verdict thanks to Brian P.'s threats towards Brian M. (resulting in his subsequent expulsion from the Handyman Rehabilitation Centre), Brian M. gets a second chance at leading the group challenge. This time, in a break from the ice hut, Brian M. must assemble a combination pool and air hockey table, which he tasks to Angie and Johnnie, while Eric focuses on building a pool cue rack. After being given the nominators to assist the foursome, the table is finished with only minor issues, while Eric insists on his rack being mounted to the wall in the common room. It goes up unlevel and Brian M. takes full responsibility for the failure.
- The Barrel Chair: The next task for Canada's Worst Handymen is to take apart their barrel and turn it into a chair. Brian M. is at a loss of what to do, with his frequent yells of "I don't know" netting him a failure. Angie also fails after cutting too much of her barrel, leaving a sizeable gap between seat and barrel, while Johnnie also fails. For Eric, Marc has been asked to leave the Handyman Rehabilitation Centre (no reason was given in this episode, but in the following episode, it is ultimately revealed that Marc was considered too much of a distraction); in his place will be Eric's wife, Michelle. While Eric is spending time in the confessional, Michelle is secretly brought in and is given a tour of both the experts' room and Eric's room. As Eric returns, he is surprised (and more than stressed) by her presence, but she also helps Eric pass the challenge.

During the expert verdict, Brian M. is taken to task for his drywalling mistake (applying plaster to a flat part of the wall), while Angie is criticized for the bad cut in her chair. Eric's criticism comes from the lack of screws in his drywall and Johnnie is taken to task on all the challenges. While Angie is implicitly given consideration as the worst for the severe drop in quality of her work, the experts are ultimately so sure of who is the worst that they do not even bother to name two nominees. Johnnie had learned the most from the plumbing challenge and is thus the most improved. However, Johnnie also did the most damage to his bathroom, so he is also the worst (joining Terry Cress from the second season as the only nominees in the show's history to be named the most improved and the worst in the same episode; Terry was named most improved and the worst in that season's fifth episode). As his homework task, Johnnie must master the six basic parts in soldering copper pipes together, all while singing to his infamous operatic musical style.

=== Episode 6: Bentwood ===
Original airdate: June 8, 2009

Starting with this episode, the opening sequence no longer includes Brian P. As a result, Brian M. is credited as simply "Brian." Additionally, the intro is shortened for the remainder of the series.

- The Vanity: The handymen must install vanities that they had purchased. Eric, believing he could build one, did not and so solicits the experts' advice on building one (as the experts also chose to build their own vanity), which he does from a barrel liquor cabinet (which was used in the closing of the previous episode to announce the worst handyman). Though his sink fits in the top of the barrel, he fails the challenge when his supply lines cannot be connected to the wall. Johnnie had the surprising foresight to get a vanity pre-assembled, and he eventually passes after a long struggle with the supply lines; like Eric, he purchased lines that were too short, though unlike Eric he was supplied with longer ones to finish the job. Angie fails as her tap hits the bottom of her medicine cabinet. Brian, after a long struggle with the taps (having installed his taps so that his hot and cold lines turn on in opposite directions), eventually passes the challenge.
- The Toilet Seat: The contestants must build their own toilet seat. Eric, who had traced his toilet seat shape from another toilet seat, passes despite the stress that he claims is caused by Michelle. The other three contestants fail: Angie for mismeasuring the seat, Brian and Johnnie for mounting the seat improperly.
- The Handyman Race: The new annual tradition begins with a race between the four handymen, as they build a stud wall and a triangular piece of plywood, as the final parts to the ice hut. The only rule in this race is that all cuts must be made before the frame can be put together. Brian's meticulous checking earns him first place, followed by Johnnie, despite early troubles with the safety on the chop saw. Angie claims third, after making several mistakes early on and having a hard time catching up. However, by far the biggest story is Eric's behaviour in this challenge; he starts to put the frame together early in violation of the challenge rules and when Andrew reminds him of this, Eric angrily smashes the frame apart with a hammer (nearly hitting Andrew and sending debris flying toward the nominators) before storming out of the challenge altogether, blaming his actions on Michelle's presence.
- Group Challenge: Bending Wood: In the year's most anticipated challenge (previewed on Daily Planet a week before the premiere), the contestants must together build four fishing nets, all from bending wood to the desired shape. After Johnnie, who is foreman, leads the group with an operatic performance, he proceeds to explain how wood can be bent. However, Eric is first to get a net finished and he gets everyone to use it to help build a jig. After a lot of struggles, all four end up with fishing nets.

In the final evaluation, Johnnie is tasked for his incomplete challenges, while Brian is tasked for the improper toilet seat, which broke as he showed it off to the experts. Eric, meanwhile, continues to show a defensive attitude and anger toward Michelle. Despite her challenge failures, Angie is named the most improved, as she found the time to fix the taps on her vanity and the experts feel that her positive attitude and approach to learning deserves rewarding. As for the worst, Geoff nominates Johnnie for creating the worst toilet seat and for taking so long to install a pre-assembled vanity. Gail, however, is so disgusted by Eric's behaviour in the Handyman Race and his awful attitude toward Michelle that she nominates him as the worst; she also adds that this is their last chance to teach him a lesson, as she does not believe that Eric will be Canada's Worst Handyman. Andrew agrees with her and Eric is named the episode's worst. For his extra challenge, Eric must own up to Michelle all the tasks that he had abandoned at home.

=== Episode 7: On Thin Ice ===
Original airdate: June 15, 2009

- The List: For the final two days in rehab, the contestants must finish any incomplete tasks, in the order in which they were first given. Contestants must finish a task or declare it "not good enough" for them to move on to the next task. Much of the effort went into completing it perfectly, however at the end of the first day, Angie and Johnnie had only few of the challenges complete, while Brian and Eric were more than halfway through the list. After the group challenge took up the morning of the second day, Angie had completed her entire list, Brian had finished nearly all of his jobs, Eric still had about a quarter of his jobs unfinished, while Johnnie was in last place by a large margin, having finished just three jobs.
- Group Challenge: The Ice Hut: With every piece of the ice hut in place, Andrew explains what they had been building all the time, using a scale model of all the parts they had built. Angie's task is to lead the nominees and nominators into building the most dangerous group challenge in the history of Canada's Worst Handyman and assemble all their pieces outside on the frozen lake surface. This begins with using their floors for their frame, supported by the window pieces. After an Amish-style barn raising (briefly interrupted by Johnnie leading everyone into singing O Canada) the bar, door and plywood pieces are mounted. Despite delays with cutting the plywood pieces (done by Johnnie, Brian and eventually Roy), the hut is completed and everyone celebrates by fishing out of it. While fishing, everyone agrees that the Handyman Rehabilitation Centre has been a successful experience for all involved.
- The Bunk Bed: As a nod to the fact that this is to be a children's room, the handyman are tasked to build a bunk bed as the final item on their list. Angie is the first to finish this, having sped her way through the list easily. Eric and Brian also have it partially complete, while Johnnie, delayed by ripping up the carpet in his room, does not.

In this final verdict, two sets of judges will decide on who Canada's Worst Handyman is: first, a group of Cub Scouts will evaluate each room. There were relatively few criticisms for Angie's room, the only major faults being that some of her bathroom fittings were rather loose, and her coat rack completely fell apart during an impromptu "stress test." Numerous faults were noted in Brian's bedroom and he was far more heavily criticized for a non-functioning bathroom (a girl scout noted that she would not shower in Brian's bathroom due to lacking a curtain). Johnnie is criticized for not finishing many challenges (among the scouts with a carpentry badge, none said that Johnnie deserved a carpentry badge) and embarrassingly, two of the scouts were able to fix in just a few moments a plumbing problem that Johnnie had been baffled by for several days. There were no faults noted with Eric's bedroom, though he was tasked for a poor bathroom (rated 4/10 by one scout). In the end, though, the cub scouts agree that neither Eric nor Angie is Canada's Worst Handyman, though they are split between Brian and Johnnie. Between the two experts, both Gail and Geoff quickly agree that Angie is easily the most improved overall, having demonstrated a positive attitude throughout, being a relatively successful leader in the final group challenge and having completed her entire list with almost every job done to an acceptable standard. Eric is also agreed to not be the worst; while he completed fewer tasks than anyone except Johnnie and his attitude was still in question, the tasks that he did complete were generally done to the highest standard of the four remaining handymen and he also completed his aim of expanding his tool knowledge, having used every tool (including some not originally called for in the shopping list) he purchased at the start of the season. As to who Canada's Worst Handyman is, though, Geoff argues the case for Brian, as Johnnie had markedly improved. Gail, however, thinks Johnnie is Canada's Worst Handyman. Between the two, she thinks of Brian as "a whiner" and Johnnie as "incompetent": Brian simply needs to be set straight while Johnnie needed more experience. Gail's opinion eventually wins out and Johnnie is eventually named Canada's Worst Handyman. Johnnie had conceded this (Angie and Eric both thought Brian was worse) and, as the Canada's Worst Handyman trophy is given to him, he sings for his captive audience an operatic rendition of his own ineptitude. With Brian managing to avoid being named Canada's Worst Handyman, he joins Darryl Andrews from the first season and Desmond "Dez" Nanassy from the previous season as the only nominees to not be named as such in a single episode.
