= Jockey box =

A jockey box is an insulated container containing ice and water, as well as a long coil of hollow tubing. The device is used to cool beverages being served on tap in temporary locations.

One end of the coiled tube in the box is fitted to the external supply of the beverage to be served (often moved from the supply container by gas pressure, as in the case of beer in kegs, and the other end is attached to taps for serving the beverage, which are often integrated into the box itself. Filling the jockey box with ice and water cools the coiled tubing, and when the beverage flows through the tube, the beverage is cooled to a temperature just above freezing, even if it was at room temperature before it entered the box. This allows cold drinks to be served on tap in temporary and outdoor venues.

Apart from the coil and taps, the jockey box resembles a cool box. Some jockey boxes force the liquid through a solid cold plate rather than a coil of tubing (see Alternative Portable Cooler Dispensers below).

A glove compartment is also sometimes referred to as a "jockey box," especially in the U.S. Upper Rocky Mountain states.

For the prior-to-use cleaning, use a flush-out hose to remove any residue or mold that might have built up inside the lines since the last time you used the jockey box.

== Alternative Portable Cooler Dispensers ==
In the coil cooler, a stainless steel coil is covered with water and ice, in which the liquid is made to run through. At the contact with the cold coil, the beverage becomes cold. On the flip side, the cold plate works making the beverage run across an ice covered aluminum cold plate. When the plate makes contact with the ice, the plate become cold provoking the liquid that runs over it becomes cold too.

A portable ice maker and water dispenser is a device that produces ice, and release chill water by a small in-house generator. Depending on the size, some of them require a water line connection, but most of them only needs to have water deposited in its container.
