= Premix and postmix =

Methods of serving soft drinks

Premixed soft drink carbonation tester.

Premix and postmix are two methods of serving soft drinks—usually carbonated—that are alternatives to bottles and cans.

Premix means that the soft drink already has the syrup and water mixed. Postmix means that the syrup is separate, and is mixed by while the drink is being dispensed.
