= List of Wait Wait... Don't Tell Me! episodes (2021) =

The following is a list of episodes of Wait Wait... Don't Tell Me!, NPR's news panel game, that aired during 2021. All episodes, unless otherwise indicated, feature host Peter Sagal and announcer/scorekeeper Bill Kurtis, and are produced through the facilities of Wait Wait co-producer WBEZ/Chicago (participants join the show through remote links). Dates indicated are the episodes' original Saturday air dates. Job titles and backgrounds of the guests reflect their status at the time of their appearance.

== January ==
Date	Guest	Panelists	Notes
January 2	"Best of 2020" episode featuring actors Christine Baranski & Doug Jones, disguise expert Jonna Mendez, and adventurer Kellee Edwards		
January 9	Actress/singer Jane Krakowski	Joel Kim Booster, Amy Dickinson, Maeve Higgins	
January 16	Singer/songwriter Phoebe Bridgers	Luke Burbank, Negin Farsad, Roxanne Roberts	
January 23	Actor/singer Mandy Patinkin and actor Kathryn Grody	Josh Gondelman, Helen Hong, Mo Rocca	Guest announcer/scorekeeper Chioke I'Anson
January 30	White House Press Secretary Jen Psaki	Jessi Klein, Yassir Lester, Tom Papa	

== February ==
Date	Guest	Panelists
February 6	Actor/screenwriter Owen Wilson	Peter Grosz, Laci Mosley, Faith Salie
February 13	CNN anchor & political correspondent Abby Phillip	Alonzo Bodden, Tom Bodett, Paula Poundstone
February 20	"Best of" episode featuring supermodel/TV host Tyra Banks, actors Sarah Paulson & Andrew Rannells, and basketball player A'ja Wilson	
February 27	Aerospace engineer Swati Mohan	Adam Felber, Mo Rocca, Dulcé Sloan

== March ==
Date	Guest	Panelists
March 6	Jordan Jonas, survival skills expert and Season 6 winner of Alone	Brian Babylon, Peter Grosz, Charla Lauriston
March 13	Comedians & late-night TV hosts Desus Nice and The Kid Mero	Karen Chee, Josh Gondelman, Maz Jobrani
March 20	Sam Sifton, food editor of The New York Times	Amy Dickinson, Negin Farsad, Mo Rocca
March 27	Filmmaker Kemp Powers	Alonzo Bodden, Helen Hong, Roxanne Roberts

== April ==
Date	Guest	Panelists
April 3	"Best of" episode featuring musician John Batiste and comediennes/actors Ali Wong and Chelsea Peretti	
April 10	Fitness instructor Ally Love	Joel Kim Booster, Maeve Higgins, Paula Poundstone
April 17	Singer/songwriter Michelle Zauner (Japanese Breakfast)	Brian Babylon, Josh Gondelman, Faith Salie
April 24	Actor/singer André De Shields	Adam Burke, Negin Farsad, Mo Rocca

== May ==
Date	Guest	Panelists	Notes
May 1	Tariq Trotter (Black Thought), rapper and lead MC of The Roots	Adam Felber, Helen Hong, Laci Mosley	
May 8	Drag performer Symone	Alonzo Bodden, Luke Burbank, Paula Poundstone	
May 15	U.S. Senator Elizabeth Warren of Massachusetts	Karen Chee, Peter Grosz, Hari Kondabolu	Guest host Maz Jobrani
May 22	Author and activist Jennifer Finney Boylan	Tom Bodett, Negin Farsad, Maeve Higgins	
May 29	Actor/comedian/TV host Joel McHale	Helen Hong, Cristela Alonzo, Jessi Klein	

== June ==
Date	Guest	Panelists
June 5	"Best of" episode featuring comedians Desus Nice & The Kid Mero, actors Mandy Patinkin & Kathryn Grody, and musicians Este & Alana Haim	
June 12	Former NBA star and 2021 Hall of Fame enshrinee Chris Bosh	Alonzo Bodden, Charla Lauriston, Roxanne Roberts
June 19	Actress/writer Anna Konkle	Luke Burbank, Faith Salie, Dulcé Sloan
June 26	Musician and producer T-Pain	Brian Babylon, Amy Dickinson, Josh Gondelman

== July ==
Date	Guest	Panelists	Notes
July 3	Roger Bennett, soccer analyst and co-host of the Men in Blazers podcast	Cristela Alonzo, Peter Grosz, Paula Poundstone	Guest host Faith Salie
July 10	Audience-themed "best of" episode featuring actors Leslie Odom, Jr. & Regina King and surfer Laird Hamilton		
July 17	Actress Phillipa Soo	Gina Brillon, Helen Hong, Mo Rocca	
July 24	Ellen Stofan, undersecretary for science & research at the Smithsonian Institution	Karen Chee, Bobcat Goldthwait, Laci Mosley	
July 31	Actor/writer Stephen Fry	Tom Bodett, Maeve Higgins, Hari Kondabolu	

== August ==
Date	Guest	Panelists	Notes
August 7	Larry Krasner, district attorney of Philadelphia	Alonzo Bodden, Mo Rocca, Dulcé Sloan	Show recorded in Philadelphia, Pennsylvania, (Mann Center); Wait Wait's first show before a live audience since March 2020
August 14	"Best of" episode featuring actors Zach Galifianakis & Charlie Day and soccer star Kristine Lilly		
August 21	"Relaxing" best-of episode featuring Singer/songwriter Phoebe Bridgers, survival skills expert Jordan Jonas, animated filmmaker Jennifer Lee, and actor Owen Wilson		
August 28	Actress Jane Kaczmarek	Josh Gondelman, Maz Jobrani, Paula Poundstone	Show recorded in Lenox, MA (Tanglewood); Guest announcer/scorekeeper Chioke I'Anson

== September ==
Date	Guest	Panelists
September 4	Actor Martin Short	Emmy Blotnick, Peter Grosz, Helen Hong
September 11	Chef and TV personality Antoni Porowski	Luke Burbank, Maeve Higgins, Laci Mosley
September 18	Journalist Yamiche Alcindor	Cristela Alonzo, Brian Babylon, Tom Papa
September 25	Actor Bowen Yang	Roy Blount, Jr., Hari Kondabolu, Faith Salie

== October ==
Date	Guest	Panelists	Notes
October 2	Rapper/actor RZA	Emmy Blotnick, Negin Farsad, Josh Gondelman	
October 9	Comedian Ilana Glazer	Adam Burke, Helen Hong, Roxanne Roberts	
October 16	"Best of" episode featuring actors Joel McHale & Phillipa Soo, scientist Ellen Stofan, and rapper Black Thought		
October 23	Actor Clint Howard and filmmaker Ron Howard	Alonzo Bodden, Karen Chee, Maz Jobrani	
October 30	New Jersey Devils defenseman P. K. Subban	Josh Gondelman, Amy Dickinson, Peter Grosz	Guest host Negin Farsad

== November ==
Date	Guest	Panelists	Notes
November 6	Hip-hop artist Chance the Rapper	Brian Babylon, Negin Farsad, Bobcat Goldthwait	Show recorded at the Harris Theater in Chicago's Millennium Park
November 13	Actor and activist Ed Begley, Jr.	Alonzo Bodden, Emmy Blotnick, Paula Poundstone	
November 20	Basketball centers Brook Lopez (Milwaukee Bucks) and Robin Lopez (Orlando Magic)	Adam Felber, Hari Kondabolu, Atsuko Okatsuka	
November 27	"Best of" episode featuring actor/writer Stephen Fry, author Jennifer Finney Boylan, White House Press Secretary Jen Psaki, and basketball hall of famer Chris Bosh		

== December ==
Date	Guest	Panelists	Notes
December 4	Actress/singer Audra McDonald	Adam Burke, Karen Chee, Maz Jobrani	
December 11	Actors Bashir and Sultan Salahuddin	Cristela Alonzo, Luke Burbank, Maeve Higgins	Show recorded at the Harris Theater in Chicago's Millennium Park
December 18	Actress/singer Keke Palmer	Tom Bodett, Mo Rocca, Faith Salie	
December 25	Previously unaired panel and contest segments "Best of" segments featuring actor Bowen Yang, former alpine skier Lindsey Vonn, U.S. Senator Elizabeth Warren, and drag performer Symone		
