= List of Wait Wait... Don't Tell Me! episodes (2016) =

The following is a list of episodes of Wait Wait... Don't Tell Me!, NPR's news panel game, that aired during 2016. All episodes, unless otherwise indicated, are hosted by Peter Sagal with announcer/scorekeeper Bill Kurtis, and originated at Chicago's Chase Auditorium. Dates indicated are the episodes' original Saturday air dates. Job titles and backgrounds of the guests reflect their status at the time of their appearance.

== January ==
Date	Guest	Panelists	Notes
January 2	"Best of" episode, featuring comedians Richard Lewis and Jenny Slate and writer/producer Matthew Weiner		
January 9	Rapper/actor/producer Ice Cube	Greg Proops, Amy Dickinson, Roy Blount, Jr.	
January 16	Actress/singer/dancer Sutton Foster	Bobcat Goldthwait, Roxanne Roberts, Mo Rocca	Guest host Mike Pesca
January 23	U.S. Secretary of Labor Thomas Perez	Paula Poundstone, Luke Burbank, Faith Salie	
January 30	Actor Richard Dreyfuss	Peter Grosz, Shelby Fero, Tom Bodett	Guest host Mike Pesca

== February ==
Date	Guest	Panelists	Notes
February 6	Actress Lena Headey	Alonzo Bodden, Roy Blount, Jr., Helen Hong	
February 13	Film & TV producers/directors Mark and Jay Duplass	Maz Jobrani, Roxanne Roberts, Mo Rocca	
February 20	"Best of" episode featuring French chef Jacques Pépin, hip-hop artist Chance the Rapper, and astrophysicist Neil deGrasse Tyson		
February 27	Singer Trisha Yearwood	Paula Poundstone, Roy Blount, Jr., Faith Salie	Show recorded at Fox Theatre in Atlanta, GA

== March ==
Date	Guest	Panelists	Notes
March 5	U.S. Senator Cory Booker of New Jersey	Adam Burke, Roxanne Roberts, Bobcat Goldthwait	
March 12	Singer Josh Groban	Faith Salie, Mo Rocca, Paula Poundstone	Show recorded at Brooklyn Academy of Music in Brooklyn, NY
March 19	Actor Andre Royo	Peter Grosz, Marina Franklin, Tom Bodett	
March 26	Jazz musician Esperanza Spalding	Luke Burbank, Roxanne Roberts, Roy Blount, Jr.	

== April ==
Date	Guest	Panelists	Notes
April 2	Author R. L. Stine	Alonzo Bodden, Amy Dickinson, Adam Felber	
April 9	Reality TV personalities Drew Scott and Jonathan Scott	Peter Grosz, Paula Poundstone, Tom Bodett	
April 16	NASCAR driver Matt Kenseth	Mo Rocca, Roxanne Roberts, Luke Burbank	Show recorded at Riverside Theater in Milwaukee, WI
April 23	"Best of" episode featuring U.S. Labor Secretary Thomas Perez, singer Trisha Yearwood, rapper Ice Cube, and motivational speaker Tony Robbins		
April 30	Journalist Lesley Stahl	Adam Burke, Faith Salie, Alonzo Bodden	

== May ==
Date	Guest	Panelists	Notes
May 7	Actress and writer Rachel Bloom	Tom Bodett, Helen Hong, P. J. O'Rourke	
May 14	Governor Gina Raimondo of Rhode Island	Amy Dickinson, Peter Grosz, Mo Rocca	Show recorded at PPAC in Providence, RI
May 21	Race car and stunt driver Ben Collins	Faith Salie, Adam Felber, Paula Poundstone	
May 28	FEMA Administrator Craig Fugate	Roy Blount, Jr., Luke Burbank, Roxanne Roberts	

== June ==
Date	Guest	Panelists	Notes
June 4	Musician-themed "Best Of 'Not My Job,'" featuring Esperanza Spalding, Marky Ramone, Josh Groban, Jewel, and Max Weinberg		
June 11	Chris Wink and Phil Stanton of Blue Man Group	Faith Salie, Peter Grosz, Brian Babylon	
June 18	Actor Terry O'Quinn	Paula Poundstone, Mo Rocca, Tom Bodett	
June 25	Portland Pilots men's basketball coach and former Trail Blazers star Terry Porter	Bobcat Goldthwait, Maz Jobrani, Roxanne Roberts	Show recorded at Arlene Schnitzer Concert Hall in Portland, OR

== July ==
Date	Guest	Panelists	Notes
July 2	TV producer Norman Lear	Adam Burke, Amy Dickinson, Gabe Liedman	
July 9	Best of "Not My Job," featuring fashion consultant Tim Gunn, authors Elizabeth Gilbert and Lee Child, travel guru Rick Steves, and actress Lena Headey		
July 16	Julian Castro, U.S. Secretary of Housing and Urban Development	Brian Babylon, Jessi Klein, Roy Blount, Jr.	
July 23	NASA Administrator Charles Bolden	Roxanne Roberts, Tom Bodett, Paula Poundstone	Show recorded at Wolf Trap in Vienna, VA
July 30	Singer Sharon Jones	Peter Grosz, Amy Dickinson, Adam Burke	

== August ==
Date	Guest	Panelists	Notes
August 6	Comedian and actor Keegan-Michael Key	Bobcat Goldthwait, Helen Hong, Faith Salie	
August 13	Journalist Katie Couric	Alonzo Bodden, Adam Felber, Paula Poundstone	
August 20	"Best of" episode, featuring comedienne Carol Burnett, astronaut Sunita Williams, FEMA Administrator Craig Fugate, and Chris Wink and Phil Stanton of Blue Man Group		
August 27	Encores of interviews with actress/writer Rachel Bloom and Property Brothers' Drew & Jonathan Scott, plus previously unaired segments including an interview with TV writer Bill Oakley		

== September ==
Date	Guest	Panelists	Notes
September 3	Former Major League Baseball pitcher Bill "Spaceman" Lee	Roy Blount, Jr., Paula Poundstone, Tom Bodett	Show recorded at Tanglewood in Lenox, MA
September 10	Actress/singer Kristin Chenoweth	Luke Burbank, Adam Felber, Faith Salie	
September 17	Musician and A Prairie Home Companion host Chris Thile	Peter Grosz, Roxanne Roberts, Adam Burke	
September 24	Actress Jamie Lee Curtis	Maz Jobrani, Amy Dickinson, Mo Rocca	

== October ==
Date	Guest	Panelists	Notes
October 1	Author Randy Wayne White	Alonzo Bodden, Tom Bodett, Faith Salie	Show recorded at Straz Center in Tampa, FL
October 8	Chef Marcus Samuelsson	Luke Burbank, Peter Grosz, Helen Hong	
October 15	Best of "Not My Job," featuring producer Norman Lear, supermodel Cindy Crawford, NASA Administrator Charles Bolden, Rhode Island Governor Gina Raimondo, and Portland Pilots men's basketball coach Terry Porter		
October 22	Choreographer Garth Fagan	Paula Poundstone, Adam Felber, Amy Dickinson	Show recorded at Auditorium Theatre in Rochester, NY
October 29	Pro Football Hall of Fame quarterback Steve Young	P. J. O'Rourke, Faith Salie, Mo Rocca	Guest host Mike Pesca

== November ==
Date	Guest	Panelists	Notes
November 5	Country singer Wynonna	Peter Grosz, Roxanne Roberts, Alonzo Bodden	Show recorded at TPAC in Nashville, TN
November 12	Sportscaster Joe Buck	Maz Jobrani, Amy Dickinson, Luke Burbank	
November 19	Country singer Garth Brooks	Roxanne Roberts, Adam Felber, Paula Poundstone	
November 26	Best of "Not My Job," featuring author R. L. Stine, actor Richard Dreyfuss, journalist Katie Couric, comedian/actor Keegan-Michael Key, and NASCAR's Matt Kenseth		

== December ==
Date	Guest	Panelists	Notes
December 3	Actor/singer Alan Cumming	Adam Felber, Helen Hong, Luke Burbank	
December 10	U.S. Senator Bernie Sanders of Vermont	Peter Grosz, Paula Poundstone, Faith Salie	Show recorded at State Theatre in Cleveland's Playhouse Square
December 17	Chef and TV personality Anthony Bourdain	Tom Bodett, Adam Burke, Roxanne Roberts	
December 24	Composer Michael Giacchino	Brian Babylon, Amy Dickinson, Adam Felber	
December 31	"Best of 2016" episode featuring musicians Chris Thile and Esperanza Spalding, Property Brothers' Drew & Jonathan Scott, and an all-Paula Poundstone segment		
