= List of Wait Wait... Don't Tell Me! episodes (2017) =

The following is a list of episodes of Wait Wait... Don't Tell Me!, NPR's news panel game, that aired during 2017. All episodes, unless otherwise indicated, are hosted by Peter Sagal with announcer/scorekeeper Bill Kurtis, and originate at Chicago's Chase Auditorium. Dates indicated are those of the episodes' original Saturday air dates. Job titles and backgrounds of the guests reflect their status at the time of their appearance.

== January ==
Date	Guest	Panelists	Notes
January 7	"Best of 2016" episode, featuring actress/singer Kristin Chenoweth, actor Terry O'Quinn, and country singers Trisha Yearwood & Garth Brooks		
January 14	Gymnast Simone Biles	Paula Poundstone, Luke Burbank, Faith Salie	Guest host Tom Hanks
January 21	Author Daniel Handler	Peter Grosz, Roy Blount, Jr., Amy Dickinson	
January 28	El-P and Killer Mike of the hip-hop duo Run the Jewels	Helen Hong, Maz Jobrani, Mo Rocca	

== February ==
Date	Guest	Panelists	Notes
February 4	Singer Mavis Staples	Faith Salie, Luke Burbank, Roxanne Roberts	
February 11	Late night TV host Stephen Colbert	Faith Salie, Peter Grosz, Mo Rocca	Show recorded in Brooklyn, NY (Brooklyn Academy of Music); Guest announcer/scorekeeper Glynn Washington
February 18	Romance novelist Nora Roberts	Roy Blount, Jr., Tom Bodett, Alexandra Petri	
February 25	"Best of" episode featuring French chef Jacques Pépin, hip-hop artist Chance the Rapper, and astrophysicist Neil deGrasse Tyson		

== March ==
Date	Guest	Panelists	Notes
March 4	Comedian/director Jordan Peele	Roxanne Roberts, Mo Rocca, Faith Salie	
March 11	Comedian Neal Brennan	Alonzo Bodden, Adam Felber, Helen Hong	Guest host Jessi Klein
March 18	Musician Paul Shaffer	Tom Bodett, Adam Burke, Negin Farsad	
March 25	Country singer Charley Pride	Roxanne Roberts, Peter Grosz, Paula Poundstone	Show recorded in Dallas, TX (Music Hall at Fair Park)

== April ==
Date	Guest	Panelists	Notes
April 1	Podcast producer/host Sarah Koenig	Luke Burbank, Amy Dickinson, Greg Proops	
April 8	Governor John Hickenlooper of Colorado	Tom Bodett, Paula Poundstone, Alonzo Bodden	Show recorded in Denver, CO (Buell Theatre)
April 15	Previously unaired panel and contestant segments "Not My Job" encores featuring soul singer Mavis Staples, hip-hop duo Run the Jewels, and gymnast Simone Biles		
April 22	Celebrity chef Ina Garten	Jeff Garlin, Mo Rocca, Faith Salie	
April 29	Former CIA advisor John Nixon	Tom Bodett, Amy Dickinson, Roy Blount, Jr.	

== May ==
Date	Guest	Panelists	Notes
May 6	Filmmaker Guy Ritchie	Luke Burbank, Paula Poundstone, Roxanne Roberts	
May 13	Moguls skier Hannah Kearney	Alonzo Bodden, Negin Farsad, Mo Rocca	Show recorded in Salt Lake City, UT (Abravanel Hall)
May 20	U.S. Senator Ben Sasse of Nebraska	Tom Bodett, Janelle James, Faith Salie	
May 27	Singer/songwriter John Prine	Alonzo Bodden, Amy Dickinson, Adam Felber	

== June ==
Date	Guest	Panelists	Notes
June 3	Previously unaired panel segments "Not My Job" encores featuring sportscaster Joe Buck, comedian Neal Brennan, composer Michael Giacchino, and choreographer Garth Fagan		
June 10	Psychotherapist Esther Perel	Tracy Clayton, Paula Poundstone, Faith Salie	
June 17	Andrew Farah, chief technological officer for General Motors	Roy Blount Jr., Alonzo Bodden, Amy Dickinson	Show recorded in Detroit, MI (Fox Theatre)
June 24	Comedian Eddie Izzard	Alonzo Bodden, Brian Babylon, Phoebe Robinson	

== July ==
Date	Guest	Panelists	Notes
July 1	Hockey Hall of Fame goalie Bernie Parent	Tom Bodett, Luke Burbank, Roxanne Roberts	Show recorded in Philadelphia, PA (Mann Center)
July 8	Previously unaired panel segments "Not My Job" encores featuring musician Paul Shaffer, celebrity chef Ina Garten, comedian/director Jordan Peele, and novelist Nora Roberts		
July 15	Actress/comedian Aubrey Plaza	Luke Burbank, Negin Farsad, Faith Salie	
July 22	Comedian Bassem Youssef	Tom Bodett, Adam Burke, Paula Poundstone	
July 29	MLB Network analyst and former Major League Baseball player Ryan Dempster	Roxanne Roberts, Adam Felber, Mo Rocca	Show recorded in Chicago's Millennium Park (Jay Pritzker Pavilion)

== August ==
Date	Guest	Panelists	Notes
August 5	Actor Jeffrey Tambor	Adam Burke, Patton Oswalt, Faith Salie	
August 12	Pro Football Hall of Fame wide receiver Jerry Rice	Roy Blount, Jr., Alonzo Bodden, Paula Poundstone	Show recorded in San Francisco, CA (Louise M. Davies Symphony Hall)
August 19	Previously unaired panel segments "Not My Job" encores featuring late-night host Stephen Colbert, actors Alan Cumming and Daniel Radcliffe, and Colorado Governor John Hickenlooper		
August 26	Encore of 1/14/2017 broadcast featuring guest host Tom Hanks and gymnast Simone Biles		

== September ==
Date	Guest	Panelists	Notes
September 2	Comedian/producer Raphael Bob-Waksberg	Adam Felber, Roxanne Roberts, Mo Rocca	
September 9	Musician Win Butler of Arcade Fire	Tom Bodett, Helen Hong, P. J. O'Rourke	
September 16	Singer/songwriter Josh Homme	Amy Dickinson, Hari Kondabolu, Paula Poundstone	
September 23	Producer/director Lee Daniels	Roxanne Roberts, Luke Burbank, Adam Burke	
September 30	Actor Adam Scott	Amy Dickinson, Mo Rocca, Alonzo Bodden	Show recorded in Dayton, OH (Schuster Performing Arts Center)

== October ==
Date	Guest	Panelists	Notes
October 7	Actor/writer and late-night personality Andy Richter	Brian Babylon, Roy Blount, Jr., Helen Hong	
October 14	Previously unaired panel and contestant segments "Not My Job" encores featuring comedian Eddie Izzard, hockey great Bernie Parent, and actress/comedian Aubrey Plaza		
October 21	Alan Page, Pro Football Hall of Fame defensive lineman and former Minnesota Supreme Court Justice	Adam Burke, Negin Farsad, Roxanne Roberts	Show recorded in Minneapolis, MN (Orpheum Theatre)
October 28	Musician and astrophysicist Brian May	Adam Burke, Luke Burbank, Paula Poundstone	

== November ==
Date	Guest	Panelists
November 4	Astronaut Scott Kelly	Alonzo Bodden, Helen Hong, Faith Salie
November 11	Animated film director Lee Unkrich	Tom Bodett, P. J. O'Rourke, Roxanne Roberts
November 18	Cartoonist and children's author Liz Climo	John Hodgman, Paula Poundstone, Mo Rocca
November 25	Previously unaired segments, including a talk with culinary expert Andrew Zimmern; Encore segments featuring moguls skier Hannah Kearney, comedian Bassem Youssef, and novelist Nora Roberts	

== December ==
Date	Guest	Panelists	Notes
December 2	Writer/director Greta Gerwig	Luke Burbank, Negin Farsad, Hari Kondabolu	Show recorded in Seattle, WA (Moore Theatre)
December 9	Rapper and actor Method Man	P. J. O'Rourke, Paula Poundstone, Faith Salie	
December 16	Journalist Katy Tur	Negin Farsad, Tom Bodett, Mo Rocca	Guest host Mike Pesca
December 23	Actor Bradley Whitford	Alonzo Bodden, Peter Grosz, Roxanne Roberts	
December 30	Previously unaired segments, including an interview with drummer Lars Ulrich; Encore segments featuring singer Mavis Staples, celebrity chef Ina Garten, and late night host Stephen Colbert		
