= List of Wait Wait... Don't Tell Me! episodes (2013) =

The following is a list of guests of Wait Wait... Don't Tell Me!, NPR's news panel game, during 2013. Job titles reflect the position of individuals at the time of the appearance. All shows, unless otherwise indicated, are hosted by Peter Sagal with announcer/scorekeeper Carl Kassell and are taped at Chicago's Chase Auditorium.

== January ==
Date	Guest	Panelists	Notes
January 5	Culinary-themed "Best of" episode featuring celebrity chef Paula Deen		
January 12	Actor Jeff Bridges	Kyrie O'Connor, Adam Felber, Paula Poundstone	
January 19	Philanthropist Melinda Gates	Roxanne Roberts, Peter Grosz, Mo Rocca	
January 26	Tech Guru Guy Kawasaki	Maz Jobrani, Amy Dickinson, Roy Blount, Jr.	

== February ==
Date	Guest	Panelists	Notes
February 2	Astronaut Mae Jemison	Faith Salie, Charlie Pierce, Brian Babylon	
February 9	Singer Erykah Badu	Paula Poundstone, Tom Bodett, Kyrie O'Connor	Show recorded in Dallas, TX
February 16	Former US Vice-President Al Gore	Brian Babylon, Roxanne Roberts, Luke Burbank	
February 23	"Best of" episode, featuring journalist Jake Tapper, TV host and author Martha Stewart, singer/songwriter Bonnie Raitt, actors Dax Shepard & Kristen Bell, and novelist John Irving		

== March ==
Date	Guest	Panelists	Notes
March 2	Sportscaster Jon Miller	Alonzo Bodden, Jessi Klein, Mo Rocca	Guest announcer/scorekeeper Bill Kurtis
March 9	United States Secretary of Education Arne Duncan	Paula Poundstone, Firoozeh Dumas, Roy Blount, Jr.	Guest announcer/scorekeeper Bill Kurtis
March 16	Singer Huey Lewis	Faith Salie, Bobcat Goldthwait, Paula Poundstone	
March 23	Professional pickpocket Apollo Robbins	Tom Bodett, Amy Dickinson, Charlie Pierce	Guest announcer/scorekeeper Bill Kurtis
March 30	R&B Singer Aaron Neville	P. J. O'Rourke, Kyrie O'Connor, Adam Felber	Guest host Tom Bodett

== April ==
Date	Guest	Panelists	Notes
April 6	Musician Rick Nielsen of Cheap Trick	Peter Grosz, Roxanne Roberts, Brian Babylon	Show recorded in Rockford, IL
April 13	Food writer Mark Bittman	Faith Salie, Alonzo Bodden, Luke Burbank	
April 20	"Best of" episode featuring actor Jeff Bridges, Secretary Of Education Arne Duncan, former Vice-President Al Gore, singer Erykah Badu, and philanthropist Melinda Gates		
April 27	Actor Kal Penn	Amy Dickinson, Maz Jobrani, Roy Blount, Jr.	

== May ==
Date	Guest	Panelists	Notes
May 4	Entertainer Steve Martin	Mo Rocca, Paula Poundstone, Tom Bodett	Show recorded in New York, NY
May 11	Google CEO Eric Schmidt	Charlie Pierce, Roxanne Roberts, Brian Babylon	Guest announcer/scorekeeper Bill Kurtis
May 18	Rock musician Alice Cooper	Bobcat Goldthwait, Kyrie O'Connor, Tom Bodett	Guest announcer/scorekeeper Bill Kurtis
May 25	Sports journalist Michele Tafoya	Mo Rocca, Adam Felber, Faith Salie	Show recorded in Minneapolis, MN; Guest announcer/scorekeeper Bill Kurtis

== June ==
Date	Guest	Panelists	Notes
June 1	Alternative medicine practitioner Deepak Chopra	Roy Blount, Jr., Amy Dickinson, Ken Jennings	Guest announcer/scorekeeper Bill Kurtis
June 8	High-wire artist Nik Wallenda	P. J. O'Rourke, Roxanne Roberts, Tom Bodett	Guest announcer/scorekeeper Bill Kurtis
June 15	Astronaut Buzz Aldrin	Bobcat Goldthwait, Faith Salie, Luke Burbank	Guest announcer/scorekeeper Bill Kurtis
June 22	Instrumentalist and songwriter Booker T. Jones	Jessi Klein, Alonzo Bodden, Paula Poundstone	Guest announcer/scorekeeper Bill Kurtis
June 29	Former track and field athlete Jackie Joyner-Kersee	Brian Babylon, Kyrie O'Connor, Mo Rocca	Show recorded in St. Louis, MO; Guest announcer/scorekeeper Bill Kurtis

== July ==
Date	Guest	Panelists	Notes
July 6	Science-themed "Best of" episode featuring NASA engineers Bobak Ferdowsi & Adam Steltzner, astrophysicist Neil DeGrasse Tyson, astrophysicist Adam Riess, Smithsonian's Wayne Clough, and NIH director Francis Collins		
July 13	Novelist Gillian Flynn	Maz Jobrani, Amy Dickinson, Paula Poundstone	
July 20	Comedian Tig Notaro	Alonzo Bodden, Faith Salie, Charlie Pierce	
July 27	Comedian Jim Gaffigan	Paula Poundstone, Kyrie O'Connor, Maz Jobrani	

== August ==
Date	Guest	Panelists	Notes
August 3	Novelist Charles Frazier	Brian Babylon, Roxanne Roberts, Bobcat Goldthwait	Show recorded in Asheville, NC
August 10	Sports-themed "Best of" episode featuring journalist Michele Tafoya, former track & field athlete Jackie Joyner-Kersee, sportscaster Jon Miller, high-wire artist Nik Wallenda and soccer player Abby Wambach		
August 17	Animal-themed "Best of" episode, featuring veterinarian Kevin Fitzgerald and animal expert Bob Freer		
August 24	Actor Tony Danza	Paula Poundstone, Adam Felber, Kyrie O'Connor	
August 31	Pianist Emanuel Ax	Charlie Pierce, Amy Dickinson, Tom Bodett	Show recorded at Tanglewood in Lenox, MA

== September ==
Date	Guest	Panelists	Notes
September 7	Movie director Baz Luhrmann	Neko Case, Alonzo Bodden, Adam Felber	
September 14	The New York Times journalist Mark Leibovich	P. J. O'Rourke, Faith Salie, Mo Rocca	
September 21	Comedian-actor Jeff Garlin	Paula Poundstone, Roy Blount, Jr., Jessi Klein	
September 28	Political consultant James Carville	Kyrie O'Connor, Tom Bodett, Brian Babylon	Show recorded in Baton Rouge, LA

== October ==
Date	Guest	Panelists	Notes
October 5	Actress Shirley Jones	Maz Jobrani, Roxanne Roberts, Charlie Pierce	
October 12	Actor Bob Odenkirk	Jessi Klein, Luke Burbank, Brian Babylon	
October 19	"Best of" episode, featuring actor Jeff Bridges, actor Henry Winkler, actor Tony Danza, singer Erykah Badu, and philanthropist Melinda Gates		
October 26	Actor John Lithgow	Mo Rocca, Peter Grosz, Roxanne Roberts	

== November ==
Date	Guest	Panelists	Notes
November 2	Poet Billy Collins	Faith Salie, Tom Bodett, Paula Poundstone	
November 9	Actor Nick Offerman	P. J. O'Rourke, Kyrie O'Connor, Bobcat Goldthwait	
November 16	Astronaut Chris Hadfield	Mo Rocca, Amy Dickinson, Roy Blount, Jr.	
November 23	Basketball coach Muffet McGraw	Brian Babylon, Faith Salie, Charlie Pierce	Show recorded in Elkhart, IN
November 30	Thanksgiving-themed "Best of" episode featuring panelists' favorite moments from recent episodes		

== December ==
Date	Guest	Panelists	Notes
December 7	Singer-songwriter Nick Lowe	Adam Felber, Kyrie O'Connor, Alonzo Bodden	
December 14	Actor Oscar Isaac	Paula Poundstone, Maz Jobrani, Faith Salie	
December 21	Soul singer Carla Thomas	Roy Blount, Jr., Roxanne Roberts, Tom Bodett	Show recorded in Memphis, TN
December 28	"Best of" episode featuring political consultant James Carville and actress Shirley Jones		
