= List of Wait Wait... Don't Tell Me! episodes (2005) =

The following is a list of episodes of Wait Wait... Don't Tell Me!, NPR's news panel game, that aired during 2005. Dates indicated are the episodes' original Saturday air dates. Job titles and backgrounds of the guests reflect their status at the time of their appearance.

Unless otherwise indicated, all Wait Wait... episodes feature host Peter Sagal and announcer/scorekeeper Carl Kasell. Also unless indicated, the show originated from Chicago, either through the studios of WBEZ or, from May 14, 2005 onward, the Bank One Auditorium (which would be rechristened the Chase Bank Auditorium later in the year after Chase Bank's acquisition of Bank One).

== January ==
Date	Guest	Panelists	Notes
January 1	Encore of 8/7/2004 episode featuring author Scott Turow		
January 8	Bob Freer, animal expert and founder of the Everglades Outpost sanctuary	Charlie Pierce, Paula Poundstone, Roxanne Roberts	Show recorded in Fort Lauderdale, FL (Parker Playhouse)
January 15	Wrestler Rulon Gardner	Roy Blount, Jr., Kyrie O'Connor, Mo Rocca	Guest host Brian Unger
January 22	no guest	Roxanne Roberts, Adam Felber, P.J. O'Rourke	Guest host Brian Unger
January 29	Celebrity hair stylist Dean Banowetz	Adam Felber, Charlie Pierce, Paula Poundstone	Guest host Brian Unger

== February ==
Date	Guest	Panelists	Notes
February 5	Humorist Kinky Friedman	Roy Blount, Jr., Sue Ellicott, P.J. O'Rourke	
February 12	Filmmaker Morgan Spurlock	Roy Blount, Jr., Adam Felber, Roxanne Roberts	
February 19	Writer Armistead Maupin	Sue Ellicott, Adam Felber, Kyrie O'Connor	Show recorded in Berkeley, CA (Zellerbach Hall)
February 26	Composer/conductor Bill Conti	Charlie Pierce, Paula Poundstone, Mo Rocca	

== March ==
Date	Guest	Panelists	Notes
March 5	Author & radio personality Tom Bodett	Sue Ellicott, Adam Felber, P.J. O'Rourke	
March 12	Actor Larry Hagman	Kyrie O'Connor, Charlie Pierce, Roxanne Roberts	Show recorded in Dallas, TX (McFarlin Auditorium)
March 19	CBS Evening News anchor Bob Schieffer	Adam Felber, Kyrie O'Connor, Aamer Haleem	
March 26	Remodeling expert Bob Vila	Roxanne Roberts, Roy Blount, Jr., Mo Rocca	

== April ==
Date	Guest	Panelists	Notes
April 2	Author and Monty Python alumnus Terry Jones	Roy Blount, Jr., Sue Ellicott, Adam Felber	
April 9	Singer Engelbert Humperdinck	Aamer Haleem, Roxanne Roberts Mo Rocca	
April 16	Tyron Stucks McFarlan, ringmaster of the Ringling Bros. and Barnum & Bailey Circus	Adam Felber, Charlie Pierce, Paula Poundstone	
April 23	Actress & singer Michelle Phillips	Roy Blount, Jr., Mo Rocca, Kyrie O'Connor	Guest announcer/scorekeeper Jean Cochran
April 30	Scott Trowbridge, executive with Universal Creative	Roy Blount, Jr., Charlie Pierce, Roxanne Roberts	Show recorded in Orlando, FL (Loews Portofino at Universal Orlando)

== May ==
Date	Guest	Panelists	Notes
May 7	Georgeanne Irvine, communications manager for the San Diego Zoo	Roy Blount, Jr., Adam Felber, Paula Poundstone	Show recorded in El Cajon, CA (East County Performing Arts Center)
May 14	Voiceover artist Don LaFontaine	Adam Felber, Sue Ellicott, Kyrie O'Connor	Wait Wait's first regular show from Chicago's Bank One Auditorium
May 21	Los Angeles Times auto critic Dan Neil	P. J. O'Rourke, Roxanne Roberts, Mo Rocca	Show recorded in Ypsilanti, MI (Pease Auditorium)
May 28	Actress Maura Tierney	Roxanne Roberts, Charlie Pierce, Richard Roeper	

== June ==
Date	Guest	Panelists	Notes
June 4	Sportscaster Al Michaels	Adam Felber, Kyrie O'Connor, Paula Poundstone	
June 11	Actress S. Epatha Merkerson	Paula Poundstone, Mo Rocca, Richard Roeper	
June 18	Songwriter Richard Sherman	Adam Felber, Paula Poundstone, Roy Blount, Jr.	Guest announcer/scorekeeper Tom Bodett
June 25	Robert Bateman, a U.S. Army Major stationed in Iraq	Aamer Haleem, Charlie Pierce, Roxanne Roberts	Guest announcer/scorekeeper Robert Siegel

== July ==
Date	Guest	Panelists	Notes
July 2	CNN anchor Wolf Blitzer	Adam Felber, Roxanne Roberts, Mo Rocca	Guest announcer/scorekeeper Scott Simon
July 9	Encores of various segments, including an interview with This American Life host Ira Glass		
July 16	Author Chuck Klosterman	Roy Blount, Jr., P.J. O'Rourke, Paula Poundstone	
July 23	Drew Curtis, founder of the Fark website	Mo Rocca, Amy Dickinson, Charlie Pierce	
July 30	Author Janet Evanovich	Adam Felber, Roxanne Roberts, Richard Roeper	

== August ==
Date	Guest	Panelists	Notes
August 6	U.S. Senator Barack Obama of Illinois	Roy Blount, Jr., Kyrie O'Connor, Paula Poundstone	
August 13	NPR Fresh Air host Terry Gross	Tom Bodett, Adam Felber, Roxanne Roberts	
August 20	T.R. Reid, Rocky Mountain bureau chief for The Washington Post	Adam Felber, Paula Poundstone, Sue Ellicott	Show recorded in Boulder, CO (Chautauqua Auditorium)
August 27	Tim Zagat, co-founder of the Zagat Survey	Paula Poundstone, Charlie Pierce, Mo Rocca	Guest host Adam Felber

== September ==
Date	Guest	Panelists	Notes
September 3	MSNBC Hardball host Chris Matthews	Roy Blount, Jr., Kyrie O'Connor, Mo Rocca	
September 10	Comedian & voice actor Jonathan Katz	Tom Bodett, Adam Felber, Amy Dickinson	
September 17	Author Lee Smith	Roy Blount, Jr., Charlie Pierce, Roxanne Roberts	Show recorded in Chapel Hill, NC (UNC Memorial Hall)
September 24	Singer/songwriter Liz Phair	Roxanne Roberts, Mo Rocca, Richard Roeper	

== October ==
Date	Guest	Panelists	Notes
October 1	Author Lauren Weisberger	Tom Bodett, Sue Ellicott, Paula Poundstone	
October 8	Miami Herald columnist and author Carl Hiaasen	Paula Poundstone, Roy Blount, Jr., Kyrie O'Connor	
October 15	Encore of 1/8/2005 episode featuring animal expert Bob Freer		
October 22	MSNBC Countdown anchor Keith Olbermann	Sue Ellicott, P.J. O'Rourke, Charlie Pierce	
October 29	Culinary author and Queer Eye for the Straight Guy regular Ted Allen	Paula Poundstone, Adam Felber, Mo Rocca	Show recorded in Springfield, IL (Sangamon Auditorium)

== November ==
Date	Guest	Panelists	Notes
November 5	Actor Adam West	Roy Blount, Jr., Roxanne Roberts, Mo Rocca	
November 12	Actor Tab Hunter	Roy Blount, Jr., Sue Ellicott, Paula Poundstone	
November 19	Columnist and author Dan Savage	Roxanne Roberts, Adam Felber, Charlie Pierce	
November 26	Author Clyde Edgerton	Roy Blount, Jr., Charlie Pierce, Roxanne Roberts	Show recorded in Chapel Hill, NC (UNC Memorial Hall); Episode theme: Historical inventions

== December ==
Date	Guest	Panelists
December 3	Jim Kelly, managing editor of Time magazine	Roy Blount, Jr., Sue Ellicott, Paula Poundstone
December 10	Filmmaker Harold Ramis	P.J. O'Rourke, Roxanne Roberts, Mo Rocca
December 17	Alternative medicine expert Dr. Andrew Weil	Roxanne Roberts, Tom Bodett, Charlie Pierce
December 24	Actress Kathryn Joosten	Amy Dickinson, Adam Felber, Kyrie O'Connor
December 31	Encore of 1/3/2004 episode featuring This American Life host Ira Glass	
