= Worst Driver =

- Created by: Quentin Willson; Duncan McAlpine
- Original work: Britain's Worst Driver (United Kingdom)
- Owner: Tinopolis
- Years: 2002–present

Worst Driver is a television franchise that started in the United Kingdom. As of 2018, Canada's Worst Driver was the longest-running version in the franchise and ran continuously since 2005. In May 2019, Andrew Younghusband announced on his personal Facebook page that the show would not be renewed for a fifteenth season, with no reason being given publicly for the series' cancellation (it is believed that Proper Television president Guy O'Sullivan's death may have contributed to the decision).

== International versions ==
Country	Title	Host	Channel	Year aired
Australia	Australia's Worst Driver	Peter Colquhoun	Seven Network	2003
Austria	Österreichs schlechtester Autofahrer	Robert Kratky	ORF	2007
Belgium	Y'a pas pire conducteur	Jean-Louis Lahaye; Maureen Louys	RTBF	2007-2009 (3 seasons)
Belgium	De slechtste chauffeur van Vlaanderen	Mathias Coppens	VTM	2004
Brazil	Ruim de Roda	Luciano Huck	Rede Globo	2012
Canada	Canada's Worst Driver	Andrew Younghusband	Discovery Channel	2005–2018 (14 seasons)
Canada	Les pires chauffards québécois	Richard Turcotte	Z Télé	2015–2017 (4 seasons)
Denmark	Danmarks Værste Bilist	Henriette Honoré (2004); Lisbeth Janniche (2005)	TV2 (2004); TV Danmark (2005)	2004–2005
Finland	Suomen surkein kuski	Juuso Mäkilähde (2012–2017); Eero Ettala (2018–present)	MTV3 MAX (season 1); MTV3 (season 2-present); Sub (reruns)	2012–present
France	Zéro de conduite		M6	
Germany	Abgewürgt und ausgebremst – Deutschlands schlechtester Autofahrer	Panagiota Petridou	VOX	2013
Netherlands	De Allerslechtste Chauffeur van Nederland (2011–2013); De Slechtste Chauffeur van Nederland (2014–present)	Ruben Nicolai (2011–2013); John Williams (2014–present)	BNN (2011–2013); RTL 5 (2014–present)	2011–present (4 seasons as of 2014)
New Zealand	New Zealand's Worst Driver			
Poland	Najgorszy polski kierowca	Stefan Friedmann	TV Puls	Fall 2007
Poland	Najgorszy polski kierowca	Stefan Friedmann	TV Puls	Spring 2008
Poland	Nie-dzielny kierowca	Stefan Friedmann	TV Puls	Fall 2008
Poland	Najgorszy polski kierowca	Aleksandra Kutz	TTV	Fall 2015
Portugal	O pior condutor de sempre	Bruno Nogueira	SIC	2006
Sweden	Sveriges värsta bilförare	Linda Isacsson (2005); Hans Fahlén (2012); Adam Alsing (2009–2011, 2014–2016); Gry Forssell (2022)	TV4 (2005–2012, 2022); Kanal 5 (2014–2016)	2005; 2009–2012; 2014–2016; 2022
Switzerland	Y'a pas pire conducteur en Suisse romande			
Ukraine	Найгірший водій країни	Volodymyr Shumko	TET	2017
United Kingdom	Britain's Worst Driver	Quentin Willson; Jenni Falconer (2005)	five	2002–2005
United States	America's Worst Driver	Alonzo Bodden; Jill Simonian	Travel Channel	2010

== History ==
On the first season of De Allerslechtste Chauffeur van Nederland in 2011, a bad driver injured host Ruben Nicolai and a cameraman during its shoulder check challenge when the driver let go of the wheel, covered his eyes and pressed the gas pedal. That was the first time a host was ever injured on any of the shows in the franchise.

== Similar shows ==
- Canada's Worst Handyman was a sister series to Canada's Worst Driver that aired from 2006 to 2011 that focused on rehabilitating the country's most inept home renovators, Don't Drive Here was a spin-off of Canada's Worst Driver that aired from 2013 to 2015 that focused on learning to drive better than a local professional driver. All three shows were hosted by Younghusband.
