= Graeme K. =

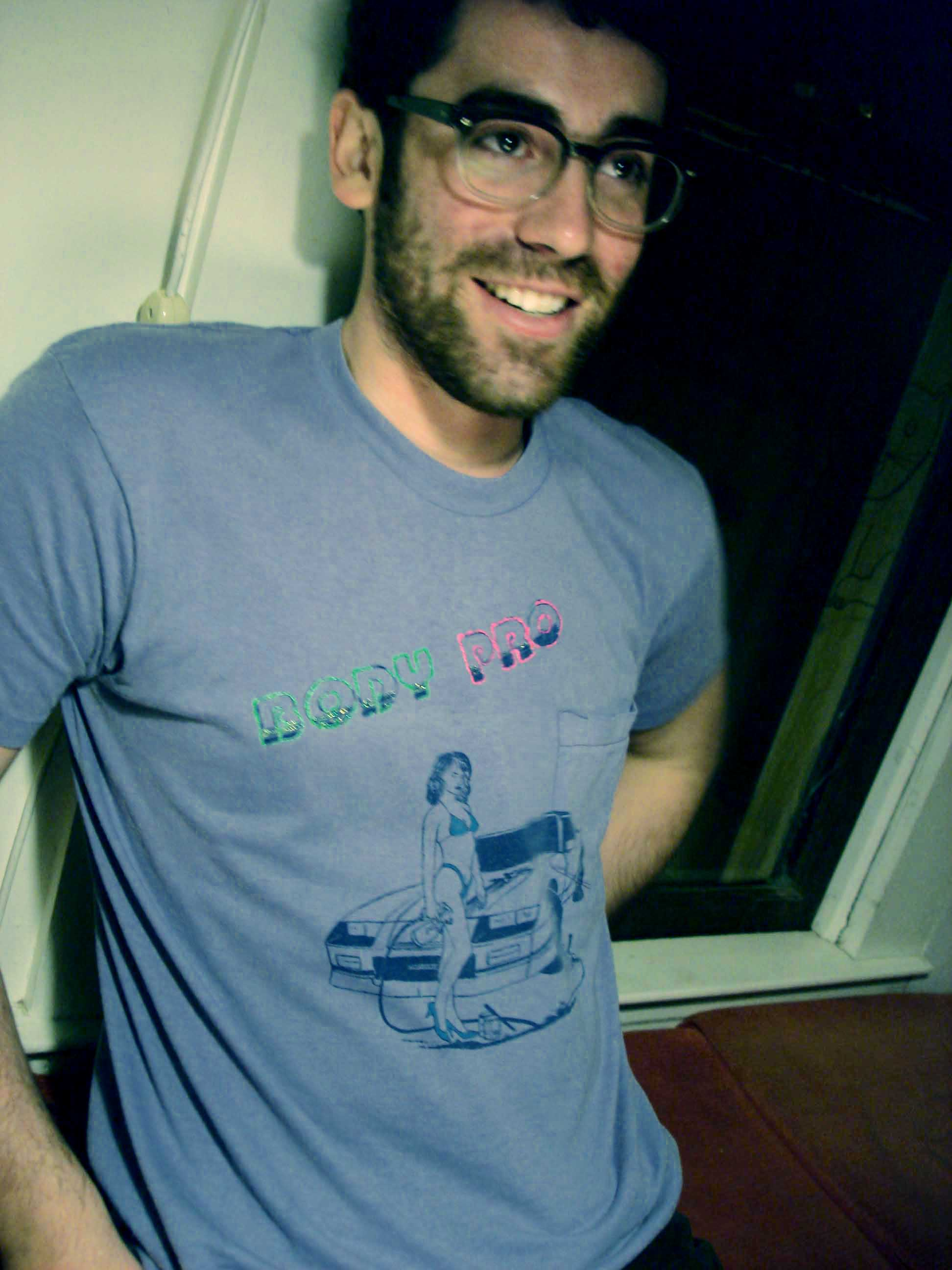

Background information
- Born: Graeme Stevens Alexander Kennedy; July 12, 1981 (age 44)
- Origin: Brunswick, Maine, United States
- Genres: Indie rock, trip hop
- Occupation(s): Musician, producer, singer-songwriter
- Instrument(s): Drums, vocals, guitar, bass guitar, piano
- Years active: 1997–present
- Labels: Mckeenstreet Music
- Website: Graeme K.

Graeme K. (born Graeme Stevens Alexander Kennedy) is a musician, producer, and owner of Mckeenstreet Music, a small, independent record label based in Portland, Maine. As an artist, he is known for dense, highly orchestrated compositions utilizing electronics and live instrumentation. In 2005, he was selected as one of the ten best unsigned artists in New York City by CMJ and asked to play in the 'Best of the Five Boroughs' concert in Prospect Park. In 2008, he released his debut record, Hidden Beast. The Bollard claimed, "The instrumentation and arrangements are astounding." Bluesbunny.com gave the record its highest score of 5 stars, calling it "Music that convinces you. Music that will put you under a spell. A spell that relieves the mediocrity of existence. It's not even about the lyrics or the melody – it's about the effect on you." Following the release of Hidden Beast, he was invited to play a showcase at the 2008 CMJ Music Marathon. His song 'Aw. Turkish. Baby.' is used regularly as an intro for the Seattle radio show Too Beautiful to Live, hosted by Luke Burbank, and is featured on their TBTL Music Guide on iTunes. He was also the drummer in the rock groups Brenda and BOXY. In 2010, he won the Best Electronic Act award in The Phoenix.
