= Bryant Park Project =

Defunct morning radio news magazine

The Bryant Park Project was a morning radio news magazine from National Public Radio that ran for 10 months in 2007 and 2008. The show's name was derived from Bryant Park in Manhattan, which NPR's New York studios overlook. While the Bryant Park Project (a.k.a. "the BPP") was originally a working title, the show debuted with the name intact on October 1, 2007. The multi-platform show was broadcast live from 7 to 9 a.m. Eastern time, Monday through Friday and, at its height, was carried by 13 NPR member stations, mostly in small markets. The Sirius Satellite Radio station NPR Now repeated the show (on tape unless breaking news necessitated live updates) from 10 a.m. to noon Eastern, 7 to 9 a.m. Pacific.

The show's founding host was Alison Stewart, previously of MTV News, ABC News and MSNBC, but Stewart went on maternity leave in April 2008. In her absence, the program was co-hosted by Rachel Martin, formerly the show's newscaster, and Mike Pesca, until Martin left on June 27, 2008, to take a position as White House correspondent for ABC News. The show's regular newscaster was Mark Garrison, but Korva Coleman often substituted from NPR's Washington bureau. The show's executive producer was Sharon Hoffman and the supervising senior producer was Matt Martinez.

On July 14, 2008, The New York Times reported that NPR would be cancelling the Bryant Park Project as of July 25, 2008. Stewart, who had planned to return from maternity leave, resumed her role on July 21 and hosted the final week of broadcasts.

== Overview ==
The show was meant to appeal to a younger, less-traditional NPR audience and succeeded in attracting online listeners, an early example of NPR programming to do so. Recurring segments include a Monday morning sports wrap-up featuring Bill Wolff (Stewart's husband and a former producer at ESPN and MSNBC executive), political news discussions with Jim VandeHei from the Politico blog, a Tuesday section on new music releases, and frequent interviews with various musicians and performers, such as Tegan and Sara, Peter Bjorn and John, Jill Sobule (who also contributed original songs to the show), and The Pipettes. Daily segments included "The Most" (a segment Stewart brought from her MSNBC show of the same name, featuring the most-read, -shared and -emailed stories from various online news sources) and "The Ramble" (a brief rundown of quirky news stories, read over a music loop from the song "In One Ear and Out the Other" by dance music trio Fujiya and Miyagi). News headlines were read at approximately 10 and 40 minutes past the hour, 10 minutes later than the traditional top and bottom of the hour updates. The show also had an occasional segment called "Make Me Care" in which guests had 60 seconds to argue why a story or subject should matter to listeners. The tone was often informal compared to the more conventional content found on other NPR newsmagazines.

Bryant Park Project was distributed online via podcast and streaming audio, and could be heard on Sirius Satellite Radio and on select NPR stations. The show also had a frequently updated blog.

On July 14, 2008, NPR announced via The New York Times that "their experimental weekday morning program, designed to draw a younger audience to public radio and capture listeners who had moved online, is being canceled." The last broadcast of the program was on July 25, 2008. The Times called the show "an expensive failure — the first-year budget was more than $2 million — and [cancellation] comes at a time when NPR is facing the same financial constraints as other news media thanks to higher costs and a downturn in underwriting."

== History ==
Luke Burbank originally co-hosted the program with Alison Stewart. On the November 13, 2007 broadcast, Burbank announced that he was planning on leaving the show in mid-December to be closer to his daughter in Seattle. Since January 2008, Burbank has hosted the nightly talk show "Too Beautiful to Live" on KIRO, an AM news and talk station in Seattle. On his current show, Burbank has alluded to being unhappy with the early-morning hours necessary to produce a morning news show and has hinted at personality conflicts with NPR producers and executives. On the May 8, 2008 episode of the show, which featured pre-recorded birthday wishes for Burbank from various friends and family members, Burbank, in speaking about his time at the BPP, said "My name is mud at NPR New York."

== Radio stations ==
The Bryant Park Project was carried on the following stations:

- KBIA 91.3 HD 3 - Columbia, Missouri
- KCPW-FM 88.3 FM - Salt Lake City, Utah
- KXOT 91.7 FM -Seattle/Tacoma, Washington
- WAER 88.3 HD 2 - Syracuse, New York
- WITF-FM 89.5 HD 2 - Harrisburg, Pennsylvania
- WLRN-FM 91.3 HD - Miami, Florida
- WPSU 91.5 HD 2 - State College, Pennsylvania
- WVTF Roanoke, Virginia; Lynchburg, Virginia; Blacksburg, Virginia; Charlottesville, Virginia
- WFFC 89.9 HD 2 - Roanoke, Virginia
- WUKY 91.3 HD 3 - Lexington, Kentucky
- WWPV-FM 88.7 FM - Burlington, Vermont
- WXXI-FM 91.5 HD 3 - Rochester, New York
- Sirius Satellite Radio
