= Freeville, New York =

- Village
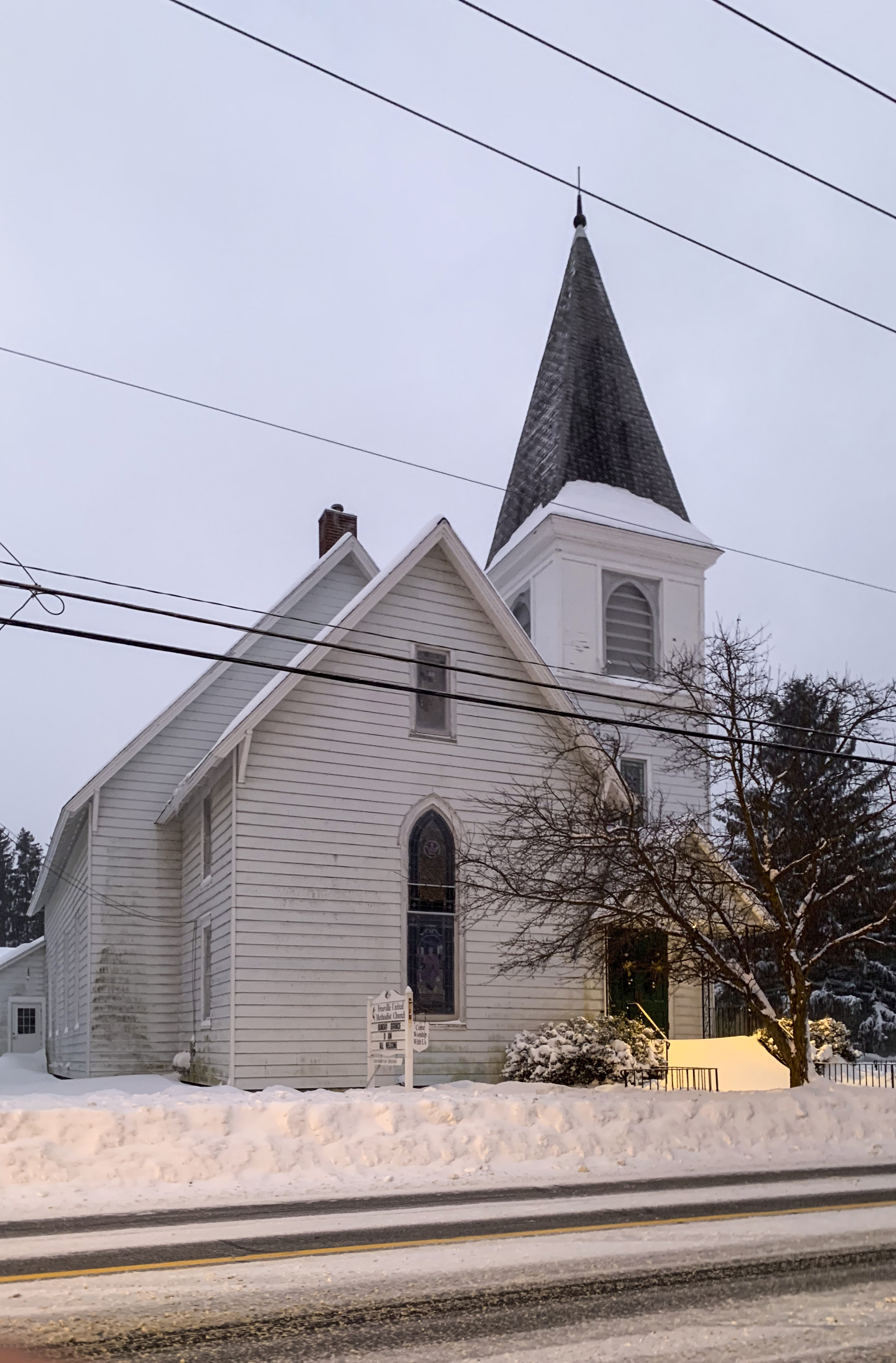
- Freeville United Methodist Church

- Location within the state of New York
- Coordinates: 42°30′45″N 76°20′45″W
- Country: United States
- State: New York
- County: Tompkins
- Settled: c. 1798
- Incorporated: July 2, 1887
- Named for: Uncertain, possibly suggested by first settler as an alternative to the name "White's Mill," which referred to him and his property

Area
  - Total: 1.10 sq mi (2.84 km^{2})
  - Land: 1.06 sq mi (2.74 km^{2})
  - Water: 0.039 sq mi (0.10 km^{2})
- Elevation: 1,043 ft (318 m)

Population (2020)
  - Total: 498
  - Density: 470.5/sq mi (181.68/km^{2})
- Time zone: UTC-5 (Eastern (EST))
  - Summer (DST): UTC-4 (EDT)
- ZIP code: 13068
- Area code: 607
- FIPS code: 36-27529
- GNIS feature ID: 0950679
- Website: freevilleny.org

Freeville is a village in Tompkins County, New York, United States. The population was 498 at the 2020 census.

The Village of Freeville is in the Town of Dryden and is east of Ithaca. It is the only incorporated municipality in the United States named Freeville.

== History ==
Freeville was in the former Central New York Military Tract. It was first settled by Daniel White, a Revolutionary War soldier who cleared land along Fall Creek and built a cabin there around 1798; by 1802 White had established a grist mill at the site.

In the early 1870s, Freeville was transformed from a quiet mill town into an important regional railroad junction when the Southern Central Railroad and the Utica, Ithaca & Elmira Railroad (acquired in 1884 by the newly created Elmira, Cortland and Northern Railroad) extended their lines through the village. Both lines were acquired in the mid-1890s by the Lehigh Valley Railroad, which maintained passenger service at Freeville through the 1930s and freight service until the 1970s.

The Village of Freeville was incorporated in 1887.

George Junior Republic, a youth center, originally called the Freeville Junior Republic, was founded just outside of the village in 1895; the name was changed in 1909.

== Geography ==
Freeville is located at 42°30′45″N 76°20′45″W (42.513, -76.346).

According to the United States Census Bureau, the village has a total area of 1.1 square miles (2.8 km^{2}), all of it land.

New York State Route 38 intersects New York State Route 366 in Freeville.

=== Climate ===
Climate data for Freeville, New York (normals 1991-2020)
Month	Jan	Feb	Mar	Apr	May	Jun	Jul	Aug	Sep	Oct	Nov	Dec	Year
Mean daily maximum °C (°F)	29.8 (−1.2)	32.5 (0.3)	40.4 (4.7)	53.2 (11.8)	66.2 (19.0)	74.5 (23.6)	79.3 (26.3)	77.6 (25.3)	70.5 (21.4)	58.0 (14.4)	46.1 (7.8)	34.9 (1.6)	55.3 (12.9)
Daily mean °C (°F)	20.7 (−6.3)	22.4 (−5.3)	30.3 (−0.9)	42.9 (6.1)	54.9 (12.7)	63.7 (17.6)	68.4 (20.2)	66.4 (19.1)	59.5 (15.3)	48.0 (8.9)	37.6 (3.1)	28.1 (−2.2)	45.2 (7.3)
Mean daily minimum °C (°F)	11.6 (−11.3)	12.2 (−11.0)	20.2 (−6.6)	32.6 (0.3)	43.7 (6.5)	52.9 (11.6)	57.5 (14.2)	55.2 (12.9)	48.6 (9.2)	37.9 (3.3)	29.2 (−1.6)	21.2 (−6.0)	35.2 (1.8)
Average rainfall mm (inches)	2.20 (56)	2.02 (51)	2.66 (68)	3.19 (81)	3.51 (89)	4.19 (106)	4.09 (104)	4.09 (104)	4.12 (105)	3.90 (99)	2.84 (72)	2.66 (68)	39.47 (1,003)

== Demographics ==
Historical population
Census	Pop.	Note	%±
1890	312		—
1900	440		41.0%
1910	318		−27.7%
1920	303		−4.7%
1930	374		23.4%
1940	379		1.3%
1950	373		−1.6%
1960	471		26.3%
1970	664		41.0%
1980	449		−32.4%
1990	437		−2.7%
2000	505		15.6%
2010	520		3.0%
2020	498		−4.2%
U.S. Decennial Census

As of the census of 2000, there were 505 people, 210 households, and 118 families residing in the village. The population density was 467.7 inhabitants per square mile (180.6/km^{2}). There were 224 housing units at an average density of 207.4 per square mile (80.1/km^{2}). The racial makeup of the village was 97.03% White, 0.59% African American, 0.20% Native American, 0.40% Asian, and 1.78% from two or more races. Hispanic or Latino of any race were 1.39% of the population.

There were 210 households, out of which 28.1% had children under the age of 18 living with them, 44.8% were married couples living together, 7.6% had a female householder with no husband present, and 43.8% were non-families. 31.0% of all households were made up of individuals, and 13.8% had someone living alone who was 65 years of age or older. The average household size was 2.33 and the average family size was 3.03.

In the village, the population was spread out, with 26.5% under the age of 18, 9.9% from 18 to 24, 27.1% from 25 to 44, 23.4% from 45 to 64, and 13.1% who were 65 years of age or older. The median age was 37 years. For every 100 females, there were 99.6 males. For every 100 females age 18 and over, there were 91.2 males.

The median income for a household in the village was $39,643, and the median income for a family was $44,688. Males had a median income of $31,500 versus $27,500 for females. The per capita income for the village was $17,910. About 7.3% of families and 9.3% of the population were below the poverty line, including 9.6% of those under age 18 and 8.0% of those age 65 or over.

== Education ==
Freeville Village is in the Dryden Central School District. The zoned comprehensive high school is Dryden High School.

== Notable people ==
- Amy Dickinson, NYT bestselling memoirist (The Mighty Queens of Freeville) and author of the syndicated advice column Ask Amy
- Woody Erdman, sportscaster, television producer, and businessman; served as chairman of the Boston Celtics
- Tim Gallagher, author and wildlife photographer
- Lonnie Park, three-time Grammy Award-winning record producer, composer, and musician
