= America's Worst Driver =

American reality television series

- Presented by: Alonzo Bodden; Jill Simonian
- Country of origin: United States
- Original language: English
- No. of seasons: 1
- No. of episodes: 10

Production
- Running time: 46 minutes (without commercials); 60 minutes (with commercials)

Original release
- Network: Travel Channel
- Release: March 13 – May 8, 2010

Related
- Britain's Worst Driver (2002-2003); Canada's Worst Driver (2005-2018)

America's Worst Driver is an American reality television program on Travel Channel, based on the television series Britain's Worst Driver and Canada's Worst Driver, part of the Worst Driver television franchise.

In the show, hosted by comedian Alonzo Bodden and writer Jill Simonian, contestants from eight cities compete to not be named the worst driver in their respective cities, because each contestant who is named the worst driver in their city has their car destroyed, while everyone else wins prizes ranging from free oil changes to a trip for two to Florida. All contestants are enrolled in a Driver's Education class in their respective cities regardless of what happens in the series. In the two-part finale, the eight worst drivers meet up in Los Angeles to show who is the most improved, with each driver winning a new car, while the driver who hasn't improved is named America's Worst Driver. Matt Conn of San Francisco was named as such, won an electric bicycle instead of a car, and had a used car representing him torn apart by Robosaurus.

== Synopsis ==
Season 1 (2010)
Contestant	1. Teeter-Totter	2. Skid Car	3. Water Tank Rattler	4. Parallel Parking a Truck	5. Road to Redemption	6. Sink or Swim	7. Memory Lane
Matt and Eli (friends, San Francisco)	IN	IN	IN	IN	IN	IN	AWD
Telea and Andrea (friends, Dallas)	IN	IN	IN	IN	IN	IN	OUT
Cristin and James (married, Chicago)	IN	IN	IN	IN	IN	OUT	
Safiya and Michael (dating, New York)	IN	IN	IN	IN	OUT		
Stephanie and Kelly (roommates, Seattle)	IN	IN	IN	OUT			
Alyssa and Parker (friends, Boston)	IN	IN	OUT				
Alex and Nadine (dating, Miami)	IN	OUT					
Janett and Brian (married, Los Angeles)	OUT						

(OUT) The contestant won a new car and is out of the running for America's Worst Driver.
(AWD) The contestant became America's Worst Driver and had a car representing them destroyed.

== Episodes ==
Season 1 (2010)
Episode	Title	Notes
Episode 1	San Francisco	
Episode 2	Boston	
Episode 3	Chicago	
Episode 4	Miami	
Episode 5	Seattle	
Episode 6	Los Angeles	
Episode 7	New York	
Episode 8	Dallas	
Episode 9	Finals, Part 1	
Episode 10	Finals, Part 2	
