= Mckeenstreet Music =

MKST

Mckeenstreet Music is a small, independent record label based in Portland, Maine. It was formerly based in Olympia, Washington, before relocating to Maine in the spring of 2009. Its first release, by electronic musician and producer Graeme K., was well received critically, with modest commercial success. Other artists on the label include Brenda (Portland, Maine), Horse Thief (San Francisco), and Dethro (Los Angeles).

The label is named after Mckeen Street in Brunswick, Maine.

The label generated its first buzz in 2008, when Sound Magazine's Editor-in-Chief praised the label's approach. In the spring of 2010, two of the label's artists won The Phoenix (newspaper) BMP's (best music poll) for best indie act (Brenda) and best electronic act (Graeme K). In 2010, after Graeme K. played their debut for Jeff Tweedy of Wilco, the label's newest band, Brenda, was asked to play at the first ever Solid Sound Festival at the Massachusetts Museum of Contemporary Art.
