= Andrew Younghusband =

Canadian television personality (born 1970)

- Born: December 14, 1970 (age 55); Canberra, Australia
- Citizenship: Canadian/Australian
- Occupations: Actor, writer, journalist
- Known for: Canada's Worst Driver, Canada's Worst Handyman, Tall Ship Chronicles, Don't Drive Here

Andrew Younghusband (born December 14, 1970, in Canberra, Australia) is a Canadian television personality, writer and journalist best known as the host of the reality shows Canada's Worst Driver, Canada's Worst Handyman, Don't Drive Here and Tougher Than It Looks, as well as the documentary series Tall Ship Chronicles.

== Personal life ==
Younghusband was born in Canberra, Australia, while his father was attending university there. Younghusband now resides in St.John's, Newfoundland. Over the course of his life and career, he has visited over 40 countries. He spent a portion of his life in a small fishing village just outside of his hometown in St. John's Newfoundland.

== On-screen roles ==
- Understanding Bliss (1990) – Andrew/Father Christmas
- Secret Nation (1992) – Brian Peckford #2
- Anchor Zone (1994) – Brogan
- Dead Silence (1997) – Reporter #1
- The Outer Limits TV series: episode "Music of the Spheres" (1997) – D.J.
- Black Harbour TV series: episode "Devil and the Deep Blue Sea" (1998) – Corporal Anderson
- Blackfly TV Series: pilot (1999) – McTavish
- Dooley Gardens TV series (1999) – Tracy
- Foodessence Reality TV (1999) – Host
- Violet (2000) – Carlos
- Tall Ship Chronicles Reality TV/documentary (2001) – Narrator/crew member
- Random Passage miniseries (2002) – Matt Escott
- Inside Media News/satire (2004) – Host
- Canada's Worst Driver Reality TV (2005–2018) – Host
- World's Worst Driver Reality TV special (2005) – Host
- Canada's Worst Handyman Reality TV (2006–2011) – Host
- Don't Drive Here Reality TV (2013–2015) – Host
- How to Be Deadly (2014)
- How Hard Can It Be? Reality TV (2015) – Host
- Tougher Than It Looks Reality TV (2016–present) – Host

== Writing credits ==
- Undercurrents writer
- Foodessence co-writer
- Tall Ship Chronicles writer
- Ultimate Survival:Everest writer
- X-Quest writer
- Inside Media writer
- Canada's Worst Driver co-writer
- World's Worst Driver co-writer
- Canada's Worst Handyman co-writer
- Blueprint for Disaster head writer

== Awards and nominations ==
Nominated: Gemini (1998), Best Writing in an Information Program or Series for Undercurrents
