= Candace O'Connor =

Freelance writer

Candace O'Connor (born January 27, 1950) is a freelance writer based in St. Louis, Missouri.

== Career ==
In 2001, O'Connor won a regional Emmy Award for Oh Freedom After While: The Missouri Sharecropper Protest of 1939, a documentary film shown on PBS nationally that she produced with Steven J. Ross. For more than two decades, her historical articles, profiles, medical articles, and other features have appeared in a variety of local and national publications.

O'Connor lives in St. Louis with her husband. She is the sister of Kyrie O'Connor.
