= Don't Drive Here =

- Created by: Andrew Younghusband
- Developed by: Proper Television
- Written by: Andrew Younghusband
- Presented by: Andrew Younghusband
- No. of seasons: 2
- No. of episodes: 12

Production
- Executive producer: Guy O'Sullivan
- Producer: Lesia Capone
- Running time: 60 minutes (including commercials)

Original release
- Network: Discovery Channel Canada
- Release: June 17, 2013 – 2015

Related
- "Worst Driver" franchise

Don't Drive Here is a reality television series. It aired on Discovery Channel Canada and was hosted by Andrew Younghusband. The series was a follow-up to Canada's Worst Driver. In August 2015, it was announced that the show had not been renewed for a third season. The show was replaced first by How Hard Can It Be?, then by Tougher Than It Looks, expanding on the challenges of driving to the challenge of doing things.

Each one-hour episode featured Younghusband in a different country completing driving challenges in one of "the world's worst driving cities", with the ultimate goal of learning to drive better than a local professional driver. Cities featured in the first season of the show included Delhi, India; Bangkok, Thailand; Mexico City, Mexico; Manila, Philippines; Ulaanbaatar, Mongolia; and Lima, Peru. Cities featured in the second season included Nairobi, Kenya; Ho Chi Minh City, Vietnam; Port-au-Prince, Haiti; La Paz, Bolivia; Rome, Italy; and São Paulo, Brazil.

Don't Drive Here was nominated for a Canadian Screen Award for Best Factual Program in 2014.

A reviewer for the Winnipeg Free Press called the show "this week's most white-knuckle-inducing, terrifying television…undoubtedly one of the most stressful hours of prime-time programming you'll encounter this or any other season".

== See also ==
- Jeremy Clarkson's Motorworld
