= 101 Cars You Must Drive =

- Starring: Alonzo Bodden
- Narrated by: Alonzo Bodden
- Country of origin: United States
- No. of seasons: 1
- No. of episodes: 10

Production
- Camera setup: Multi-camera
- Running time: 22 minutes

Original release
- Network: Speed TV
- Release: June 30 – September 1, 2008

101 Cars you Must Drive was a Speed TV program hosted by actor and comedian Alonzo Bodden. The premise of the program is that there will be (at least) 101 cars, and that all 5 cars within a particular episode can be linked to one another in some fashion.

== Description ==
The first season consisted of 10 half-hour-long episodes. Bodden drove each of the five described vehicles, with the exceptions of the Chevrolet Nova, 1951 Aerocar, Chrysler K-Car, Ford Bronco, Chevrolet Corvette Mk IV prototype, and the 1955 Chevrolet Bel-Air. Although he did not drive one, Bodden did ride in a Renault R5. 50 vehicles were reviewed by Bodden.

== Cancellation ==
Alonzo Bodden has stated the show has been cancelled by Speed.

== Episode list ==
Ep. #	Episode Name	Original Air Date	Cars included in episode
1-1	"The Bird is the Word"	June 30, 2008	1 - 1956-1958 Studebaker Golden Hawk; 2 - 1970 Plymouth Superbird; 3 - 1955-1957 Ford Thunderbird; 4 - 1951 Aerocar; 5 - 1964 Chrysler Turbine
1-2	"I'm Just Here for the Sex"	July 7, 2008	1 - 1966-1968 Alfa Romeo Duetto Spider; 2 - 1957-1977 Fiat 500; 3 - 1948-1990 Citroen 2CV; 4 - 1985 Renault R5 Turbo 2; 5 - 1981-1983 DeLorean Motor Company DeLorean
1-3	"A Lot of Pulp - But No Fiction"	July 14, 2008	1 - 1990-2005 Acura NSX; 2 - 1971-1977 Chevrolet Nova; 3 - 1960-1969 Chevrolet Corvair; 4 - 1949-1980 Volkswagen Beetle; 5 - 1955-1965 Porsche Speedster D
1-4	"A Bit of All Right"	July 21, 2008	1 - 1958-1960 MG-A; 2 - 1964-1967 Sunbeam Tiger; 3 - 1981-1989 Dodge Aries; 4 - 2006 Mitsubishi Lancer Evo; 5 - 1955-1962 BMW Isetta
1-5	"Bond, Blowers, Buicks, ETC.."	July 28, 2008	1 - 1963-1965 Aston Martin; 2 - 1930-1931 Bentley Blower 4½ Litre; 3 - 1987 Buick GNX; 4 - 1951 Buick LeSabre Concept; 5 - 2006 Chevrolet Corvette Z06
1-6	"Party Over Where? Party Right Here! "	August 4, 2008	1 - 1975-1980 AMC Pacer; 2 - 2006 Hummer H1 Alpha; 3 - 1942-1945 Jeep; 4 - 1961-1968 Amphicar Model 770; 5 - 1968-1976 BMW 2002
1-7	"Keeping It in the Family"	August 11, 2008	1 - 1958 Edsel Pacer; 2 - 1972-1974 Ferrari Dino 246GTS; 3 - 1954 Porsche Spyder; 4 - 1949-1951 Mercury Coupe; 5 - 1940-1971 Lincoln Continental
1-8	"Playin’ in the Dirt"	August 18, 2008	1 - 1966-1970 Meyers Manx; 2 - 1966-1977 Ford Bronco; 3 - 1909-1927 Ford Model T 4 - 1997-2006 Jeep Wrangler; 5 - 1957-1962 Fiat Jolly
1-9	"Wankels and Wankers"	August 25, 2008	1 - 2006-2008 Mazda RX-8; 2 - 1967-1977 NSU Ro80; 3 - 1970 Chevrolet Corvette Mark IV; 4 - 1960-1982 Checker Superba-Marathon; 5 - 1936-1940 Austin FX4
1-10	"Street Racing Then and Now"	September 1, 2008	1 - 1932 Ford Hot Rod; 2 - 1955 Chevrolet Bel Air; 3 - 1975 Honda 600; 4 - 1998–present smart fortwo 5 - 1953–present Mercedes-Benz Unimog
