= Bernard Willson =

British linguist, academic and Bletchley Park veteran

- Born: Harold Bernard Willson; 25 February 1919; Brentford, Middlesex
- Died: 1994 (aged 75); Leicester, Leicestershire
- Occupations: Linguist (German), Academic
- Spouse(s): Agnes "Nan" Gullon/Willson (1917–1999)
- Children: Vivian Willson; Quentin Willson; Ashley Willson; Chloe Willson

Harold Bernard Willson (25 February 1919 – 1994) was a British linguist and noted academic, who during the Second World War was the first person to decrypt the Italian Navy Hagelin C-38 code machine. He was the father of television presenter and motoring journalist Quentin Willson.

== Life ==
Willson graduated from Trinity College, Cambridge with a degree in modern languages, having studied under J. R. M. Butler.

On entering the Second World War in June 1940, the Italian military were using book codes for most of their military messages. The exception was the Italian Navy which, early in 1941, started using the C-38 version of the Hagelin rotor-based cipher machine, which they used to route their navy and merchant marine convoys to the conflict in North Africa.

Willson was recruited in 1941 by J. R. M. Butler to join a team with two others in Hut 4 at Bletchley Park, the Italian subsection of the Government Code and Cypher School. Dedicated to cracking the Italian Navy Hagelin code, the team were working in partnership with the Cairo-based team of the Eighth Army Intelligence Chief Brigadier Edgar Williams, who reported to General Bernard Montgomery. In June 1941 Willson became the first of the team to decode the Hagelin system, thus enabling military commanders to direct the Royal Navy and Royal Air Force to sink Axis ships carrying supplies from Europe to Libya. With shipping losses increasing, from reading the resultant Ultra traffic the team learn that between May and September 1941 the stock of fuel for the Luftwaffe in North Africa fell by 90 per cent. The cracking of Hagelin is considered to have been "hugely significant", so much that Prime Minister Winston Churchill visited Hut 4 on a visit to Bletchley Park to thank the team for their endeavours. After an intensive language course, in March 1944 Willson switched to Japanese language-based codes.

Exactly what Willson did and most importantly how he did it remains confidential. After the war, Hagelin founded Crypto AG, which made new versions of his coding machine based on the same logic of encryption. In 1957 the National Security Agency engaged William Friedman to negotiate a deal with Hagelin to give the United States and its ally the United Kingdom access to the coding system. This was later extended to the new electronic based versions of the Hagelin system, which gave the two countries a backdoor into all Hagelin machines distributed to allies and enemies, including: the Vatican; the Iranian Islamic regime; Saddam Hussein; Muammar Gaddafi; Ferdinand Marcos; Idi Amin. Access continued until at least 1983, when US Naval Intelligence officer Jonathan Pollard, sold the information to Mossad (the Israeli Intelligence Service), who traded it to the Soviet Union in return for more exit visas being given to Soviet Jews to emigrate to Israel. The KGB (the Soviet Intelligence Service) probably already knew of the backdoor, via their US-based spies, Aldrich Ames and Robert Hanssen. In 1946 Willson returned to civilian life as an academic, rising to become Dean of the Faculty of Arts at Leicester University. Like many of those who served at Bletchley Park, he was never awarded a medal and never discussed his work.

== Posthumous celebration ==
Willson's work at Bletchley Park was featured in the 2011 Channel 5 documentary Hero in my Family in 2011, in which his son Quentin Willson commented:

Dad was a much more significant human being than I ever dreamed. I feel very mixed up about the fact that there were times when I doubted him, doubted his strength and courage. I'm really, really proud to be his son.
