= Britain's Worst Driver =

British television series

- Also known as: Britain's Worst Celebrity Driver (2003-05)
- Genre: Reality
- Created by: Quentin Willson; Duncan McAlpine
- Presented by: Quentin Willson (2002-2004); Jenni Falconer (2005)
- Country of origin: United Kingdom
- Original language: English
- No. of series: 2
- No. of episodes: 14 (30 inc. specials)

Production
- Running time: 30 minutes (inc. adverts)
- Production company: Mentorn

Original release
- Network: Five
- Release: 18 October 2002 – 25 September 2005

Related
- Worst Driver

Britain's Worst Driver is a British television series that was broadcast on Channel 5 between 2002 and 2005. Created and hosted by ex-Top Gear host Quentin Willson and made by Mentorn, the show was mostly filmed at Millbrook Proving Ground in Bedfordshire, England.

== Format ==
Each series, eight drivers were nominated by friends and family as being 'Britain's Worst Driver' and on the show had the opportunity to "earn back" their driving licences by performing various driving challenges, judged by a panel of industry experts including a motor accident investigator, a behavioural psychologist, a chief executive of a motor insurance group, and presenter/motoring journalist Vicki Butler-Henderson. The driver who performed the worst over the course of the series was awarded Britain's Worst Driver.

In each episode, the drivers received extra tuition and were then set driving related challenges to show what they had learnt and to gauge their improvement. The driver that the panel of judges deemed to have shown the most improvement was allowed to go home and was rewarded with a brand new car and a course of additional driving lessons.

Comedian Tim Key, nicknamed 'Timid Tim' for his seemingly cautious and slow approach to driving on the roads, was a contestant on the first series. He won the third episode (eliminated second), however sold the car that he had won, a Ford Ka, after a week. He later mentioned that he needed money at the time and that acting in the show was an ideal way to make profit from the car he won.

Contestants in the first series were Arif Patel, Becky Francis, Craig Dean, Joseph Youssefi, Kay Brown, Sharon Welburn, Tim Key and Valli Holland. In the second series contestants were Brian, Carol, Chris, Janice, Daz, Rita, Karl, and Nikki, who left the show in episode 5 .

In the first series Kay Brown was titled "Britain's worst driver", the title held by Brian Scrivener in series 2.

In the first series, Joseph was the first rehabilited driver and won a Rover 75. In following episodes, Tim won a Ford Ka, Valli won a Suzuki Jimny, and Arif won the booby prize of a Lada Riva, leaving Sharon to win an MG TF.

In the second series, first to get a car was Chris who won a classic Mini, before Karl won the then new Mini One. In the fourth episode Daz won £10,000 in cash to compensate for the blowing up of his modified Vauxhall Nova and bought a base BMW E36 318. Nikki then left the show and Rita won the Austin Allegro, leaving Janice, who won the grand prize of a Jaguar X-Type, albeit in the final episode, as none of the contestants had improved prior. After Daz was eliminated, the Smart Roadster disappeared from the car selection.

== Transmissions ==
=== Regular series ===
Series	Start date	End date	Episodes
1	18 October 2002	29 November 2002	7
2	9 September 2003	21 October 2003	7

=== Celebrity series ===
Series	Start date	End date	Episodes
1	4 November 2003	2 December 2003	5
2	11 September 2005	25 September 2005	7

=== Specials ===
Date	Entitle
28 October 2003	Highlights
24 December 2003	The Best of...
