= Live Wire Radio =

- Genre: Comedy, music, interview, variety
- Running time: 1 hour
- Country of origin: United States
- Language: English
- Home station: Oregon Public Broadcasting
- Syndicates: Public Radio Exchange
- Starring: Luke Burbank
- Created by: Kate Sokoloff and Robyn Tenenbaum
- Executive producer: Laura Hadden
- Edited by: Melanie Sevcenko
- Recording studio: Alberta Rose Theatre; Portland, Oregon
- Original release: 2004 – present
- No. of episodes: 300+
- Website: livewireradio.org

Live Wire Radio is a radio variety show that was launched in 2004 in Portland, Oregon, United States.

Live Wire was initially hosted by Rob Sample, followed by Courtenay Hameister, with current hosting duties covered by Luke Burbank. Burbank has a podcast called Too Beautiful to Live and is an occasional guest-host on the nationally syndicated NPR quiz show Wait Wait... Don't Tell Me!.

Live Wire is built on various elements such as standup comedy, guest interviews, and musical performances. Its emphasis is on the quirky local character of Portland. Each show is recorded in front of a live audience, every other week, which is then edited into material for two weekly shows.

== History ==
In February 2003, Kate Sokoloff approached Robyn Tenenbaum with the idea for Live Wire, a younger, "hipper" version of Prairie Home Companion, in a format similar to West Coast Live. Tenenbaum had worked on rock concerts with Bill Graham Presents, and for four years had helped produce West Coast Live for NPR in San Francisco. Sokoloff was producing local theatre. The two women started a production company called Moxiefish, and put together a demo of Live Wire in September 2003, which they shopped to Oregon Public Broadcasting (OPB). About 150 people watched the first taping in March 2004 at the Hollywood Theatre, hosted by Rob Sample. The first broadcast was at 7 pm on Saturday, March 27, 2004, over the OPB network.

At first, the show was produced monthly. By 2005, the taping was held primarily at the Aladdin Theater in Portland, with 350 to 500 in the audience. One show was taped at the Mission Theatre & Pub in October 2005. The Gerding Theatre in the First Regiment Armory Annex was used for a summer show in 2013.

Because of Sample's other commitments, head writer Courtenay Hameister replaced him as host after four shows. Hameister was working as an advertising copy writer, and she had helped to produce the sketch comedy show The State which aired on MTV in the early 1990s. Live Wire consulted with Bill Oakley, known for his writing credits on the television shows The Simpsons and Portlandia.

Live Wire started airing weekly in Autumn 2010, taping four shows in two live recording sessions every month except January and July at Portland's Alberta Rose Theatre. In March 2012 the show reached its 100th episode.

In September 2013, Luke Burbank became the show's official host, after filling in as guest host after Hameister stepped down in March of that year. With his podcast audience and appearances on Wait Wait... Don't Tell Me!, producers hoped Burbank would bring Live Wire a higher national profile. Hameister stayed with the show as head writer.

== Broadcast coverage ==
Live Wire first aired on OPB in 2004. In early 2009 it was beginning to have a national audience. The show uses Public Radio Exchange for delivery to markets outside of Oregon. It airs on a delayed/recorded basis on six National Public Radio stations outside of Portland, including Spokane and Indianapolis, and seven volunteer-run community radio stations. According to the Portland Monthly, by January 2014 it was carried by 40 US stations and one in England, with some 80,000 listeners each week. It is also available as a podcast. As of February 2014 the show's website listed only 14 stations on which it aired and explained that its airing in England was limited to the Royal Berkshire Hospital, an acute care facility. In 2014, Live Wire was picked up by Public Radio International.

== Corporate sponsors ==
Major underwriters for the show include the Fully (ergonomic chairs and desks), Alaska Airlines, and Whole Foods Market.

== Guests ==
Notable guests on the show have included radio host Thom Hartmann, local politician David Bragdon, author Jonathan Raymond, author David Shields, author Katherine Dunn, writer David Carr, alt rocker Chris Ballew, author Daniel Handler (known as Lemony Snicket), comic book artists Brian Michael Bendis and Michael Avon Oeming, sex advice columnist Dan Savage, and Michael Powell of Powell's Books. In 2008 for Portland's Wordstock festival, Live Wire hosted cartoonist/author Lynda Barry, cartoonist Alison Bechdel, indie rockers the Long Winters from Seattle, singer/songwriter Jonathan Coulton, musician McKinley of the band Dirty Martini, writer and performance artist Sandra Tsing Loh, radio journalist/producer Jay Allison, author/actor John Hodgman, and poetry slam champion Anis Mojgani. Other guests have included political satirist and radio show producer Lizz Winstead, journalist Tom Bissell, writer David Oliver Relin, Burgerville CEO Jeff Harvey, rock band the Moondoggies, singer/songwriter Bobby Bare Jr., actor Daniel Stern, puppeteer Michael Curry, cartoonist John Callahan, rock band the Dandy Warhols, singer/songwriter Storm Large, punk blues band Hillstomp, and Peter Sagal host of the NPR and WBEZ Chicago news quiz Wait Wait... Don't Tell Me.

== See also ==
- Media in Portland, Oregon
