= The Mighty Queens of Freeville =

2009 book by Amy Dickinson

- Author: Amy Dickinson
- Language: English
- Genre: Memoir
- Publisher: Hyperion Books
- Publication date: February 3, 2009
- Media type: Print (hardcover)
- ISBN: 978-1-401-32285-4

The Mighty Queens of Freeville: A Mother, a Daughter, and the Town That Raised Them is a memoir by Amy Dickinson, the author of the syndicated advice column Ask Amy. It was released on February 3, 2009 by Hyperion Books.

On the publication date, Dickinson appeared on Good Morning America and the following day she appeared on The View to promote the memoir, which chronicles her experiences with divorce and single motherhood and her life in a family that is predominantly made up of women. The Mighty Queens in the title refer to her mother, aunts and sisters. Dickinson also went on a book tour to promote the memoir, making stops all over the country.

On February 22, 2009, the book debuted on The New York Times bestseller list at number sixteen, tied with Barack Obama's inauguration address. In 2010, a paperback copy of the book was released with a slightly different cover design.
