= Quentin Willson =

British television presenter (1957–2025)

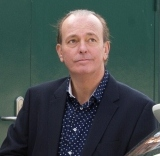
- Willson in 2012
- Born: 23 July 1957; Leicester, England
- Died: 8 November 2025 (aged 68); Stratford-upon-Avon, England
- Occupations: Television presenter; author; journalist; broadcaster
- Children: 3
- Website: www.quentinwillson.co.uk

Signature
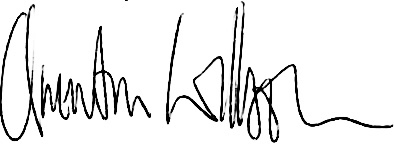

Quentin Mcdonald Willson (23 July 1957 – 8 November 2025) was an English television presenter and producer, motoring journalist, author and car dealer. He was best known as a presenter of the popular television motoring programmes Top Gear, Britain's Worst Driver and Fifth Gear.

== Early life ==
Quentin Willson was born on 23 July 1957, with his twin brother, Ashley, in Leicester, England, the son of Agnes (née Gullon) a lecturer and Professor H Bernard Willson, a linguist. His father was the first code breaker at Bletchley Park to decode the Italian Navy Hagelin C‑36 code machine. According to Private Eye, Willson was convicted in 1988 of 8 offences relating to the sale of used cars with false descriptions, including a car which had been clocked.

== Television ==
Willson joined the BBC in 1991 to co-host the original version of Top Gear with Jeremy Clarkson. Until the original format's cancellation in 2001, he appeared every week on the programme, typically as an expert on used cars.

Willson presented the car series The Car's the Star, from September 1994 for six series.

In 1999, Willson presented All The Right Moves, a property focussed series on BBC2. The programme explored the broader mechanics of buying, selling, and relocating, whilst offering practical advice regarding the property market.

Following Top Gear's cancellation, he left the BBC to present Channel 5's rival motoring programme, Fifth Gear in 2002. When Top Gear was relaunched, Willson said of Clarkson that "It's a compliment that the BBC are so afraid of losing ratings to us, they've lured my old co-host out of semi-retirement." Willson stopped presenting Fifth Gear in 2005.

Willson also participated in the second series of Strictly Come Dancing in 2004, but received the lowest score ever on the show, which still stands to this day, on his single dance before being voted off.

On 12 January 2009, and again on 4 December 2010, he appeared on BBC Breakfast giving advice on snow driving and which cars are better suited. On 5 April 2012, he once again appeared on BBC Breakfast talking about the Highway Code. He also regularly featured on the ITV breakfast show Daybreak, when there were motoring related features.

In February 2015, Willson returned to Channel 5 to host The Classic Car Show.

== Campaigning ==
In the 1990s, both in print and on television, Willson highlighted the artificially higher prices of new cars in the UK compared to Europe, campaigning for price parity for UK buyers. He was widely credited with drawing attention to uncompetitive pricing by the car makers which prompted the European Commission to take action and use block exemption regulations to force the industry to reduce UK list prices on new passenger cars.

=== Fair Fuel UK ===
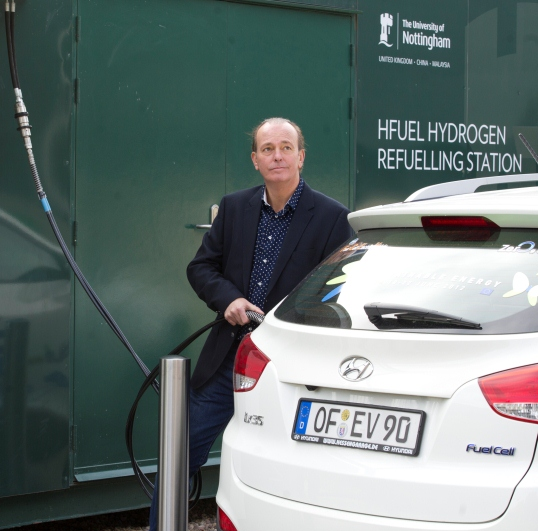
Willson refuelling a Hyundai ix35 fuel cell car with hydrogen in 2012

From early 2011 until 2021, Willson was the national spokesman for FairFuelUK campaigning for lower government fuel duty. From March 2011, Willson and the FairFuelUK Team successfully pressured the UK government to defer 11p of duty rises, reducing the overall tax take by £5.5 billion in fuel duty. His campaigning appeared on various television news programmes and The Times, The Telegraph, The Sun and other national newspapers.

Fair Fuel UK is funded by two industry associations: the Freight Transport Association and the Road Haulage Association. Its previous funders have included the RAC, the Association of Pallet Networks and UKLPG, among others.

In September 2021, Willson resigned from Fair Fuel UK because he was "unhappy with the direction the lobby group was going and their lack of environmental sensibilities".

== Consultancy and speaking ==
Willson was a consultant to various organisations and companies including the car warranty company Warrantywise. He was also a former consultant to BP, BSI Group and Castrol Oil in 2008–10. He also made regular appearances on the conference and after dinner speaking circuit.

== Death ==
Willson died on 8 November 2025, at the age of 68, after being diagnosed with lung cancer. He was survived by his wife, Michaela and their 3 children. Documents that surfaced in 2026 suggest that after IHT and estate costs, Willson left £1.85 million net in his 2003 will.

== Writing ==
In 2004, Willson was awarded Motoring Writer of the Year. He wrote regularly for Daily Mirror and The Sunday Mirror for 15 years as well to Classic Cars magazine.

He was also the author of ten books:

- "Top Gear": Good Car Guide by Quentin Willson (BBC Books, 1993)
- "Top Gear": Good Car Guide by Quentin Willson (BBC Books, 1994)
- Classic Cars of the World by Quentin Willson and David Selby (DK Publishing, 1995)
- Ultimate Classic Car by Quentin Willson (DK Publishing, 1995. Republished with David Selby.)
- Classic American Cars by Quentin Willson (DK Publishing, 1997)
- The Quentin Willson Guide to Used Cars: Everything You Need to Know by Quentin Willson (Virgin Books, 2001)
- Quentin Willson's Cool Cars by Quentin Willson (DK Publishing, Second edition 2001)
- Cars, A Celebration by Quentin Willson (DK Publishing, 2001)
- Great Cars by Quentin Willson (DK Publishing, 2001)
- Ultimate Sports Car by Quentin Willson (DK Publishing, 2002)

== Videos/DVDs ==
| Year | Title | Format |
|---|---|---|
| 1994 | Top Gear – Classic Cars | VHS |
| 1999 | Project Healey 3000 | VHS |
| 2009 | Project Healey 3000 | DVD |
