= UNC Memorial Hall =

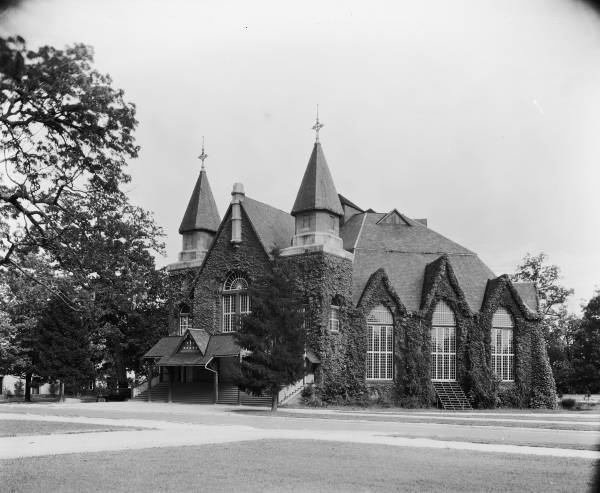
The first Memorial Hall, pictured in 1885

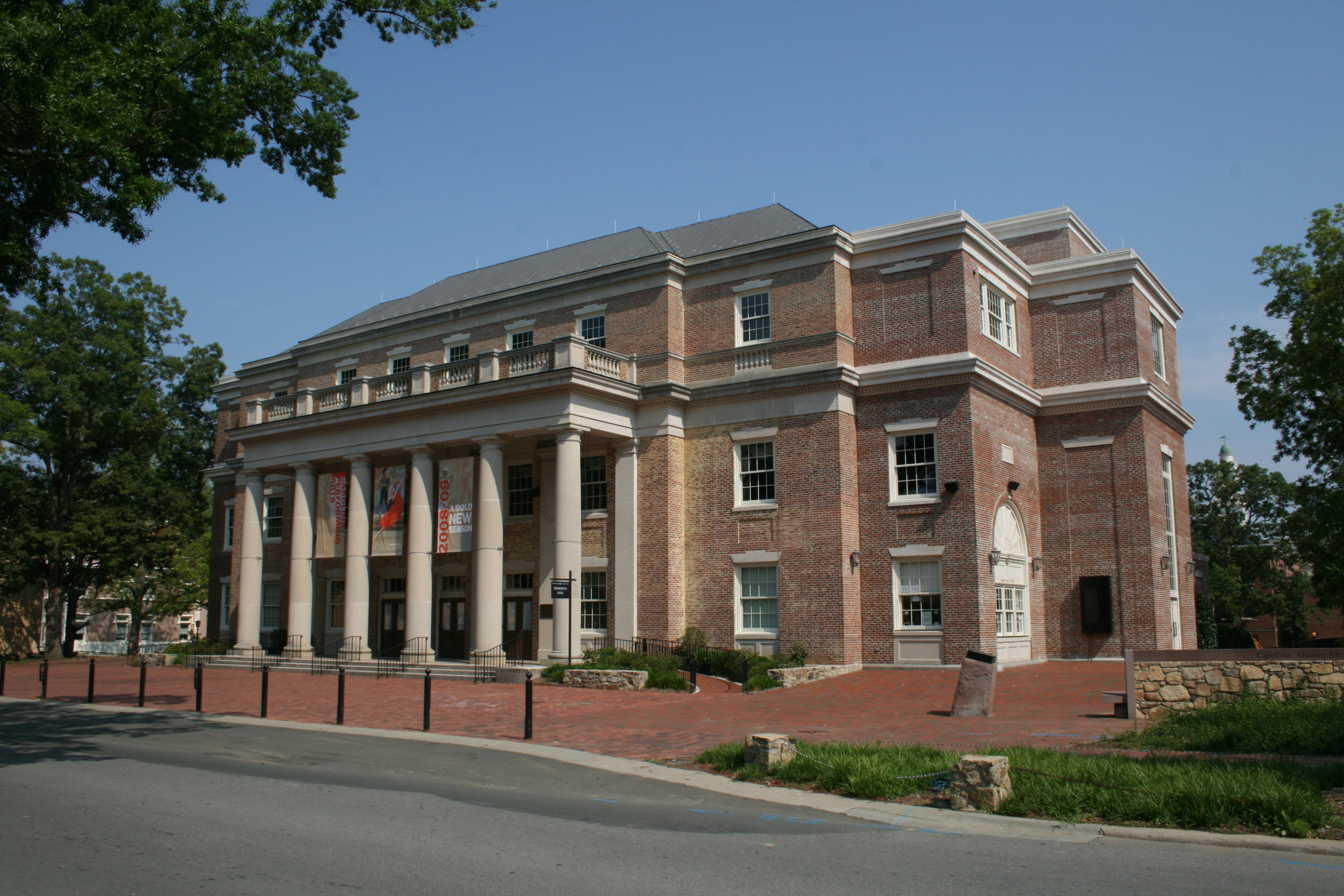
2008-07-11 UNC-CH Memorial Hall

Memorial Hall was initially built in 1883 to be used for events like commencement ceremonies and the first ever basketball games at the University of North Carolina at Chapel Hill. The architect, Samuel Sloan, designed the building to be larger than the previously used Gerrard Hall so that it could hold up to 4,000 people. Memorial Hall was created to honor the men at the university who fought in the Civil War and to commemorate some of the important antebellum figures at the University of North Carolina. Specifically David L. Swain was one of the men honored in the making of the building. Funding for Memorial Hall was initially provided by selling marble tablets that were dedicated to certain men who fell in battle during the Civil War. The tablets still exist and are kept on display at the current Memorial Hall.

In 1929, the original building was determined to be unsafe, and it was therefore demolished while a new plan was set to construct a larger and sturdier auditorium. The second Memorial Hall was used for 70 years for purposes such as musical performances, lectures, cultural events, and more. At the turn of the millennium, however, a third plan was proposed by the university for a refurbishing of the auditorium to make room for the growing community in Chapel Hill, North Carolina. The three-year plan began with the temporary closing of Memorial Hall in 2002. Construction started in May 2003 and the newly improved Memorial Hall was completed in August 2005. The present Memorial Hall includes updates such as air-conditioning, a stage twice the size of the 1930 building, and marble flooring that was mined from the same quarry that was used in the 1930 building. Funding for the third Memorial Hall totaled $17,981,080 coming from the Higher Education Bond Referendum, private donors, university funds, and the North Carolina General Assembly.

The Carolina Performing Arts website displays the annual calendar of events held at each of their three venues: Memorial Hall, Playmakers Theatre, and Gerrard Hall . Every year, Memorial Hall hosts artists and performers from all over the world. The Carolina Performing Arts group puts on shows each year ranging from the Nutcracker Ballet to the Pittsburgh Symphony.
