= Emmy Blotnick =

American comedian and television writer

- Education: Northwestern University

Comedy career
- Medium: Stand-up; television
- Website: www.emmyblotnick.com

Emmy Blotnick is an American stand-up comedian and television writer. She has written for The Late Show with Stephen Colbert and was head writer of The President Show. Her stand-up releases include the album Party Nights (2019) and the special What's Her Secret? (2026).

== Early life and education ==
Blotnick grew up in Cambridge, Massachusetts, and studied film and legal studies at Northwestern University. In 2010, she co-directed the university's student comedy show Sit & Spin Stand Up 4.

== Career ==
=== Television ===
Blotnick has written for Nikki & Sara Live and Not Safe with Nikki Glaser. By 2017, she had written for @midnight and was head writer of The President Show. She joined The Late Show in April 2018.

In 2018, Blotnick suggested turning Donald Trump's remarks following Hurricane Florence into a children's book. The idea became Whose Boat Is This Boat?, a satirical picture book compiled by the staff of The Late Show. In 2019, she shared a Primetime Emmy Award for Outstanding Writing for a Variety Series nomination as a member of the show's writing staff.

Her later writing credits include Pause with Sam Jay, History of the World, Part II and English Teacher. The English Teacher writing staff, including Blotnick, received a Writers Guild of America Award nomination for New Series in 2025.

=== Stand-up comedy ===
Blotnick's debut half-hour Comedy Central special premiered in 2018. In 2019, she released the album Party Nights through 800 Pound Gorilla Records. That year, she first performed at the Edinburgh Festival Fringe debut with a show of the same name.

In 2022, she performed The 30 Fragrances of Jennifer Lopez at the Fringe. The show used Jennifer Lopez's perfumes as a starting point for autobiographical stories.

Her stand-up special What's Her Secret? premiered on Gorilla Comedy+ in May 2026. It was later released on YouTube.
