= Too Beautiful to Live =

American radio show and podcast

- Genre: Talk/Comedy/Pop Culture
- Language: English

Cast and voices
- Hosted by: Luke Burbank and Andrew Walsh

Production
- Length: 1 hour - 90 minutes (approximate)

Technical specifications
- Audio format: MP3

Publication
- Original release: Original Radio Run: January 7, 2008-September 11, 2009, – Podcast Inception September 14, 2009-Present
- Provider: Too Beautiful To Biz (self-owned)
- Updates: Daily (weekdays)

Related
- Website: www.tbtl.net

Too Beautiful to Live (often abbreviated to TBTL) is a podcast originating from Seattle, Washington, and Portland, Oregon, co-hosted by Luke Burbank, CBS News Sunday Morning correspondent, host of Live Wire Radio and frequent NPR's Wait Wait...Don't Tell Me! panelist, and veteran radio producer and one-time radio host Andrew Walsh. The podcast originated as a radio show on KIRO-FM which aired from January 7, 2008, to September 11, 2009. Upon its radio broadcast cancellation, it immediately transitioned to a podcast on September 14, 2009, and is still produced Monday through Friday.

Fans of the show are often referred to as "The Tens", stemming from an early radio episode where Luke would mention how they only have "tens" of listeners, rather than "hundreds" or "thousands".

== Format ==
The show begins with the song "Catch My Disease" by Ben Lee, underneath a number of audio quotes from movies, TV shows or viral videos. Burbank welcomes listeners and outlines the upcoming show, followed by introducing his co-host and guests for the show. His current co-host/producer is fellow former KIRO radio host and veteran radio producer Andrew Walsh. Infrequently, former TBTL radio show producer Jennifer Andrews and engineer Sean DeTore will appear. In addition to the commentary of Burbank and Walsh on life, pop culture, and current events, the show features listener e-mails and voicemail, and closes with a music selection by the hosts. On Friday shows, the closing song is chosen by a listener.

== Radio show ==
TBTL aired on 97.3 KIRO FM (and 710 KIRO AM before the station moved to FM) from 7:00 to 10:00 pm weeknights and at the same time on Saturdays for the "Best Of", which included clips from the past week's shows. The format was similar to that of the podcast, with Luke Burbank joined by Jennifer Andrews and Sean DeTore. TBTL was a non-caller-driven program; listener phone calls were accepted on an infrequent basis. Instead on Wednesdays the shows had a "Call Makers" feature where listeners who previously sent in a phone number and question(s) were called and the question(s) discussed live on-air.

News reports about the show characterized it as an attempt by KIRO, and its owner Bonneville International, to add a younger audience to KIRO's older listener base, however, the Seattle Times noted that the show had only managed to draw 1.4 percent of 25- to 54-year-olds - the program's target sales demographic - who were listening to a radio at 7:00pm. While the program was Seattle Weekly's choice as "Best Radio Talk Show" in July 2009, after a poor showing in the Arbitron ratings, KIRO cancelled the program in September.

== Conversion to podcast ==
While TBTL was an over-the-air ratings disappointment, it had attracted a national download following. In its final month of broadcasting, it had attracted more than 225,000 podcast download hours. The Stranger noted that "the younger listeners were, in fact, tuning in... they just weren't using the same equipment that KIRO's general audience uses." Thus, when the radio program was cancelled, Burbank and KIRO announced that the program would continue as a daily podcast. On March 2, 2015, TBTL transitioned to Infinite Guest, American Public Media's Podcast Network. In July 2023, the podcast left APM Podcasts and is now independently produced and published. The show has produced over four thousand episodes.
