= Tom Bodett =

American writer, voice actor and radio host (born 1955)

- Bodett on Brattleboro Community Television in 2013
- Born: Thomas Edward Bodett; February 23, 1955 (age 71); Champaign, Illinois, U.S.
- Occupations: Author, voice actor, radio host, columnist
- Years active: 1986–present
- Website: Official site

Thomas Edward Bodett (/boʊˈdɛt/ boh-DET; born February 23, 1955) is an American author, voice actor, woodworker and radio personality, primarily as a host, correspondent and panelist for a number of shows that air on National Public Radio (NPR). Since 1986, he has been the spokesman for the motel chain Motel 6, ending commercials with the phrase, "I'm Tom Bodett for Motel 6, and we'll leave the light on for you."

== Personal background ==
Thomas Edward Bodett was born on February 23, 1955, in Champaign, Illinois, and raised in Sturgis, Michigan. As of 2013, he resided in Dummerston, Vermont, where he is a member of the town's board of selectmen. After moving to Vermont, Bodett took up woodworking. In 2019, he co-founded HatchSpace, a non-profit workshop in Brattleboro, Vermont, where residents can use tools and collaborate with others.

== Career ==
=== Spokesperson ===
==== Motel 6 ====
In 1986, Bodett was building houses in Homer, Alaska, and contributing to NPR's All Things Considered. A creative director at the Richards Group ad agency heard him on NPR and hired him to record a commercial for Motel 6. Bodett ad-libbed the famous line "We'll leave the light on for you" and has been the chain's spokesperson ever since. The director David Fowler hired him because Bodett "sound[ed] like the kind of person who stays there." Fowler said he thought, "Gosh, if I only had an account for a national budget motel brand with a sense of humor and humility, I could make a heck of an advertising campaign with this guy."

In 2000, Motel 6 began using Bodett for their wake-up calls. The chain hoped to bring a more personal touch to people's days by using their spokesperson's voice. Bodett was also featured on the first Motel 6 podcast, released for the holidays.

In November 2015, a new marketing campaign featuring Bodett's voice premiered, highlighted by TV and radio commercials touting the investment in and renovation of Motel 6 properties nationwide.

In June 2025, Bodett filed a lawsuit against Motel 6 for $1.2 million, claiming the motel chain missed the annual payment he has been receiving since 1986. Bodett's contract was due to end in November 2025, and Motel 6 was still using Bodett's voice and tagline on their national phone reservation system. The lawsuit was settled out of court, ending their longtime relationship.

==== Jamesway ====
From 1993 to 1994, Bodett was also the spokesperson for Jamesway department stores in Delaware, New Jersey, New York, and Pennsylvania, and recorded radio commercials for it. A discount chain, Jamesway filed Chapter 7 bankruptcy in the fall of 1995 and closed at the end of the year.

=== Media appearances ===
==== Radio ====
As a broadcaster, Bodett hosted two radio programs: The End of the Road (1988–1990) and Bodett & Company (1993).

In 1999, Bodett started The Loose Leaf Book Company, a radio program that centered on author and book interviews, discussions, and dramatizations.

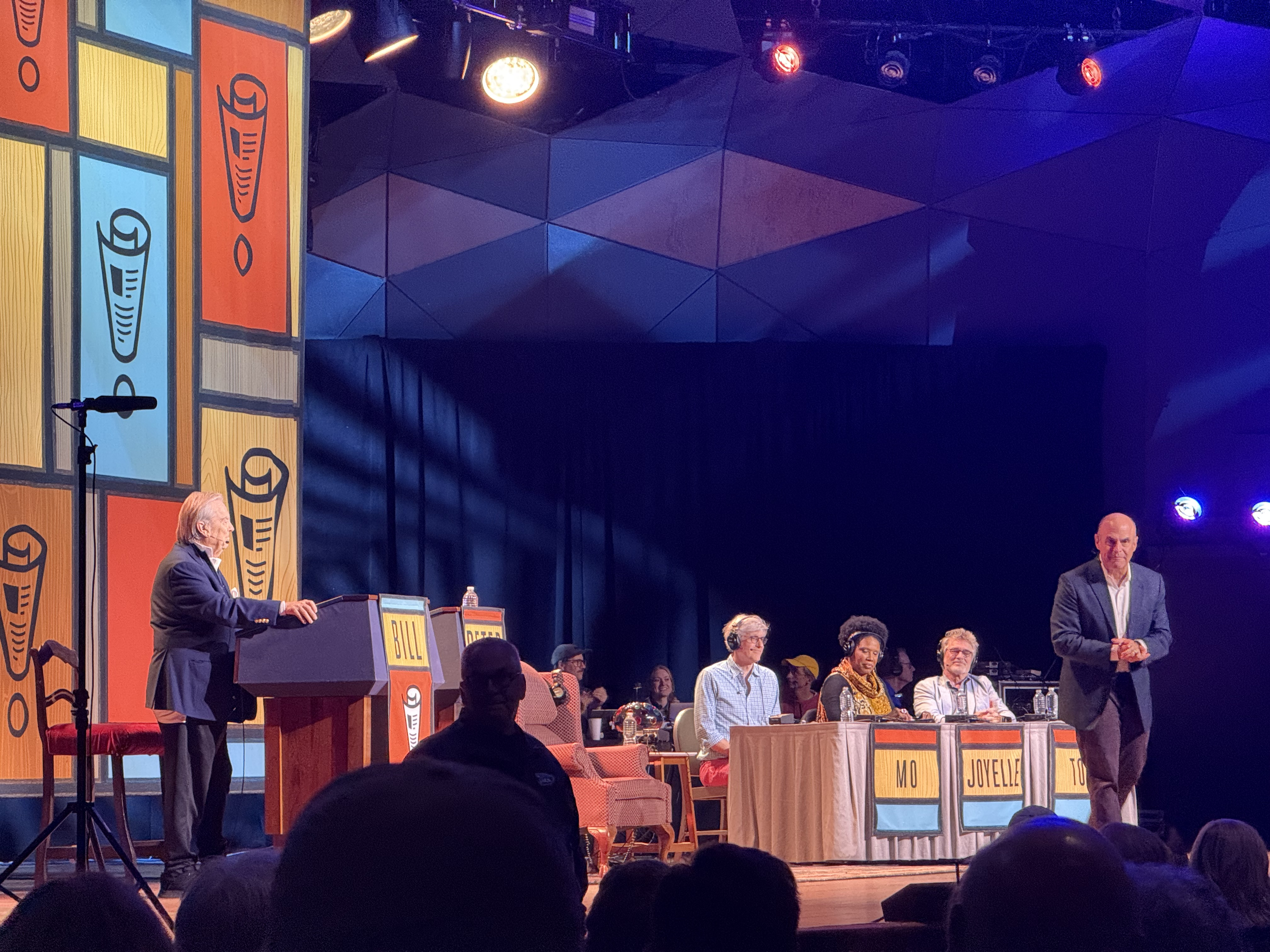
Bodett as a panelist on Wait Wait... Don't Tell Me!

He was a contributor to The Bob Edwards Show on XMPR and remains a member of the stable of panelists on Wait Wait... Don't Tell Me!, a National Public Radio news quiz show.

In 2015, he was interviewed as a guest on Episode 301 of Public Radio International's Live Wire Radio.

==== Television ====
Bodett hosted the public television program Travels on America's Historic Trails (1997). He also appeared on the Animaniacs cartoon series, doing the voice-over for "Mime Time" and the "Good Idea/Bad Idea" segments featuring Mr. Skullhead, had a brief cameo in Pinky and the Brain, and narrated the direct-to-video Animaniacs movie Wakko's Wish (1999).

==== Webzine ====
Bodett was a regular columnist for the webzine Mr. Showbiz.

==== Podcasts ====
Bodett's name was used humorously for various non-playable characters in the Dungeons & Dragons podcast series The Adventure Zone, though these were voiced by DM Griffin McElroy, not Bodett himself. In the graphic novel under the same name, an uncanny likeness of Bodett can be seen interacting with the series' main characters.

== Writing ==
In 1999, Bodett published his first children's book, Williwaw!

=== Published works ===
- As Far As You Can Go Without a Passport (1986), ISBN 0-201-10661-2
- Small Comforts (1987), ISBN 0-201-13417-9
- The End of the Road (1989), ISBN 0-688-08701-9
- The Big Garage on Clear Shot (1990), ISBN 0-688-09525-9
- The Free Fall of Webster Cummings (1996), ISBN 0-7868-6209-2
- America's Historic Trails (1997), ISBN 0-912333-00-6
- Williwaw! (2000), ISBN 0-375-80687-3
- Norman Tuttle on the Last Frontier (2004), ISBN 0-679-89031-9
- "Alaska A to Z: The Most Comprehensive Book of Facts and Figures Ever Compiled About Alaska" (1993), ISBN 1878425757
- "The Free Fall of Webster Cummings: Volume One of "Tom Bodett's American Odyssey" (1960)
- "America's Historic Trails: With Tom Bodett" (1997), ISBN 0912333006
- "Growing Up, Growing Old & Going Fishing at the End of the Road" ISBN 0553470183
- "Those Grand Occasions at the End of the Road"
- "As Far as You Can Go Without a Passport: Views from the End of the Road" (1985)
- "First Words"
- "Old Fools & Young Hearts"
- "No Place Like Home"
- "(The) Last Decent Parking Place in North America", ISBN 055345272X

Audio Cassette - 1991 by Random House Audio "The Free Fall of Webster Cummings: Volume One of "Tom Bodett's American Odyssey" (1960) Audio Cassette

- "The Great Divide, Volume Two (Tom Bodett's American Odyssey)" (1995), ISBN 1561008567 Audio Cassette
- "Peach Picking Time, Volume Three (Tom Bodett's American Odyssey)" (1995), ISBN 1561008575 Audio Cassette
- "No Place Like Home, Volume Four (Tom Bodett's American Odyssey)" (1996), ISBN 1561008583 Audio Cassette
- "Ed's Fruits and Vegetables, Volume 5 (Tom Bodett's American Odyssey)" (1996), ISBN 1561008591 Audio Cassette

Song, Tom Bodett by Mark David Manders

- "Better Part of the Road"(1992), ISBN 0553470191 Audio Cassette
