= Luke Burbank =

American radio host and podcaster (born 1976)

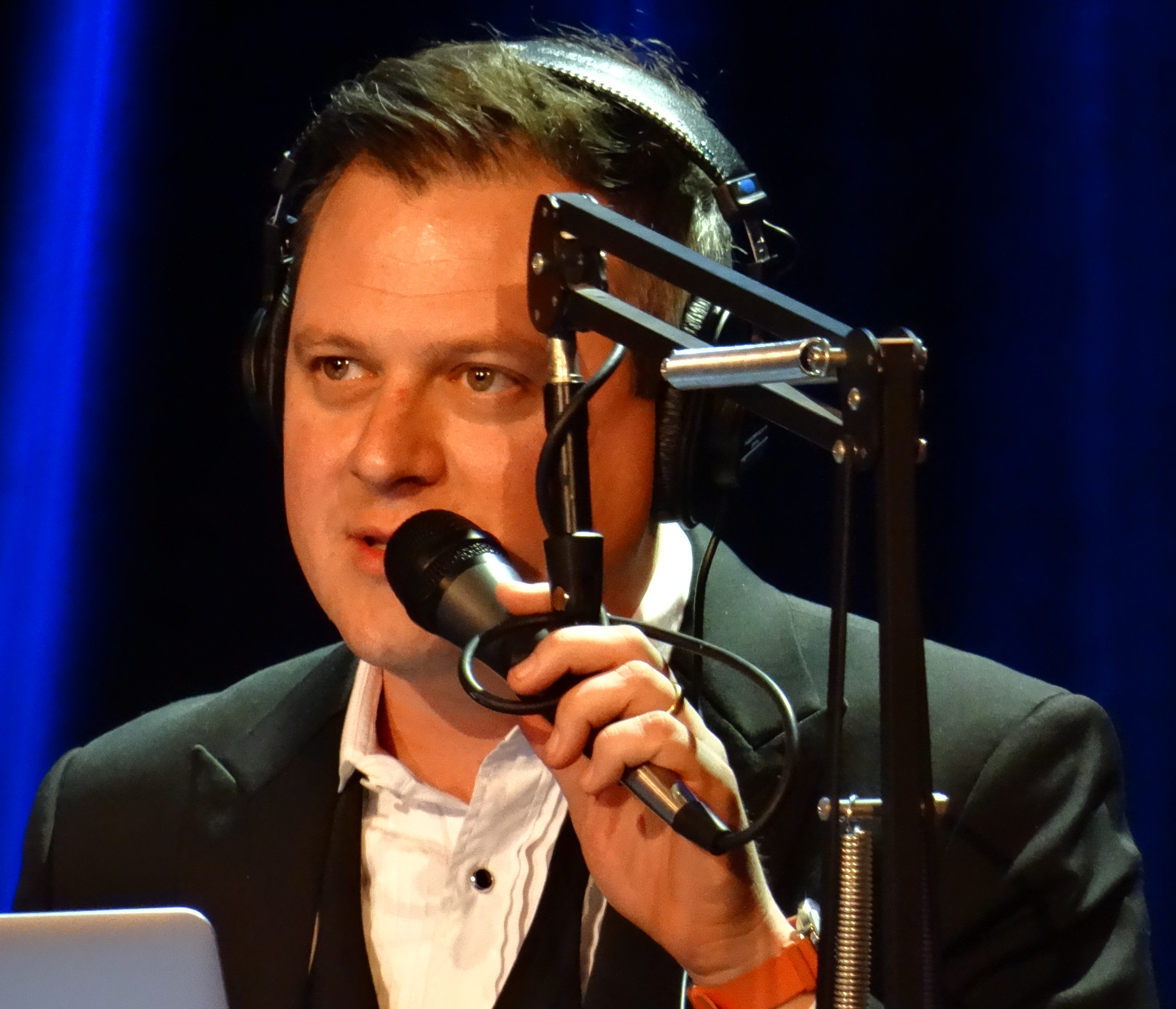
- Burbank, taping the 2000th episode of his program Too Beautiful to Live in 2015
- Born: May 8, 1976 (age 50); Eureka, California
- Spouse(s): Carey Burbank (2013–2020); Nicola Vruwink (2001–2006)
- Children: 1
- Presenting career
- Show: Too Beautiful to Live
- Station: Podcast
- Show: Live Wire Radio
- Stations: Podcast, Public Radio
- Style: Talk Show
- Country: United States
- Previous shows: Bryant Park Project (host), Wait Wait... Don't Tell Me! (guest host and panelist), Ross and Burbank (co-host), The Luke Burbank Show (host)
- Website: www.tbtl.net

Luke Burbank (born May 8, 1976) is an American radio host and podcaster who hosts the Portland, Oregon-based syndicated variety show Live Wire Radio and the Seattle-based former radio program and current podcast Too Beautiful to Live. He was most recently co-host of "The Ross and Burbank Show" and host of "The Luke Burbank Show" on Seattle's KIRO-FM radio station. Burbank is also a correspondent for CBS News Sunday Morning.

== Early life ==
Burbank was raised at Lighthouse Ranch on Table Bluff in Humboldt County, California, where he spent his private time listening to radio shows. In the 1980s his parents moved to Seattle, Washington, where he attended high school. He graduated with a communications degree from the University of Washington in 1998, with an emphasis on editorial journalism.

== Radio ==
Early in his radio career, Burbank worked in Seattle as a producer for the conservative talk show host Kirby Wilbur as well as the public radio station's KUOW 94.9 FM local talk show The Conversation and the public radio show "Rewind". Later, Burbank moved to Los Angeles, California, where he began booking appearances for the NPR program Day to Day and worked as an assignment reporter on shows All Things Considered and Morning Edition. On November 2, 2001, he had a story aired on This American Life.

In July 2006, he became a panelist on the radio game show Wait Wait...Don't Tell Me!. He substituted as host for Peter Sagal for some weeks while Sagal finished his book, and has since guest-hosted when Sagal is on vacation.

Burbank spent two months as host of NPR's short-lived morning show The Bryant Park Project, an experiment in alternate programming by the network that aired on 13 public radio stations. Burbank left the show in mid-December 2007 in order to spend more time with his daughter in Seattle. His last appearance on the program was on December 14, 2007.

After leaving NPR, Burbank returned to Seattle to host a local show called Too Beautiful to Live. The program ran for 18 months (initially on KIRO-AM and then on KIRO-FM). It was Seattle Weekly's choice as "Best Radio Talk Show" in July 2009, but after a poor showing in the July Arbitron ratings, the radio program was canceled in September. Burbank and KIRO said that the program would continue as a daily podcast. The podcast has continued since its radio cancellation, first on American Public Media and then as an independent podcast since 2023, with longest-serving co-host Andrew Walsh, a veteran radio producer and sometime host in his own right.

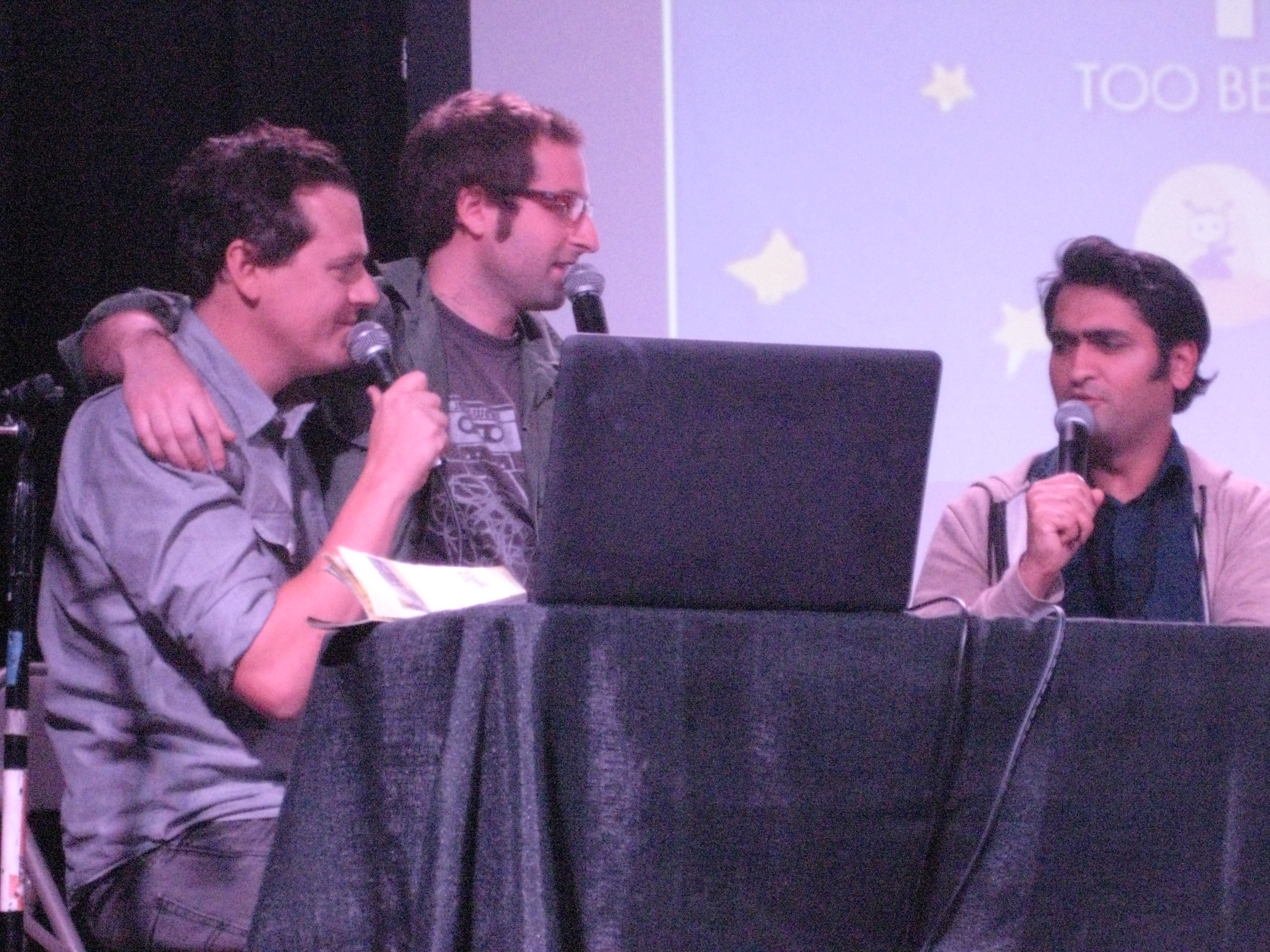
Burbank (left) with Sean DeTore and Kumail Nanjiani at Bumbershoot, 2010

On October 26, 2010, after one year off the KIRO airwaves, Burbank joined The Dave Ross Show as co-host. The show was renamed to The Ross and Burbank Show. On January 7, 2013, the show was involved in a KIRO morning lineup change. Ross anchored Seattle's Morning News from 6 a.m. to 9 a.m., then co-hosted The Ross and Burbank Show from 9 a.m. to 10 a.m. Burbank hosted The Luke Burbank Show from 10 a.m. to noon. with co-host Tom Tangney. On August 2, 2013, Burbank announced that he was leaving both shows to pursue longer-form broadcast opportunities.

On March 11, 2013, Burbank became the interim host for the syndicated public radio variety show Live Wire Radio. In September 2013, he became the full-time host.

== Other appearances ==
He previously appeared in a regular weekly segment titled "Awesome, Not Awesome" on the Madeleine Brand show on KPCC (Pasadena, California) until its cancellation in September 2012.

In September 2013, he starred in a Microsoft online video advertisement with his wife Carey Burbank, which made headlines after it was pulled by the company less than 24 hours later following viewer backlash. The Huffington Post declared the ad was "terrible" while The Next Web described it as "cringeworthy." Burbank defended the ad, however, saying it was "successful."
