= Alonzo Bodden =

American comedian and actor

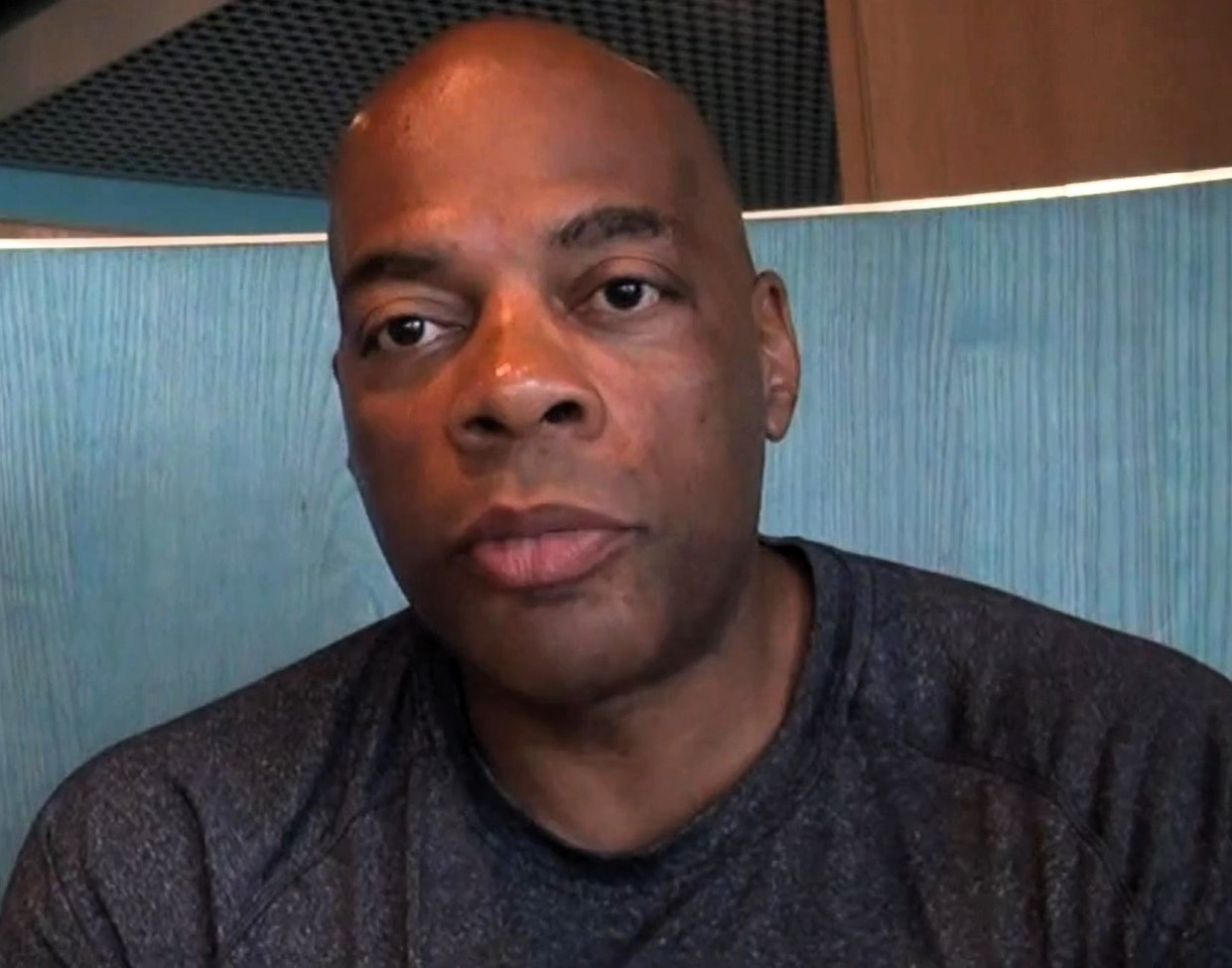
- Bodden in 2013
- Born: June 13, 1962 (age 64); Queens, New York, U.S.
- Occupations: Comedian, actor, television host
- Years active: 1995–present
- Known for: Last Comic Standing, Mind of a Man, America's Worst Driver
- Website: www.alonzobodden.com

Alonzo Bodden (/əˈlɒnzoʊ ˈboʊdən/; born June 13, 1962) is an American stand-up comedian, actor, writer and former political commentator. In 2004, he won NBC's reality competition TV show Last Comic Standing in its third season after being the runner-up in its second season earlier in the year. Bodden debuted his comedy album in 2001, and his hour-long DVD special and his half-hour television special in 2005. He has been a recurring panelist on NPR's quiz radio show Wait Wait... Don't Tell Me! since 2010, and has appeared as a host and contributor on news platform The Young Turks.

== Early life ==
Bodden was born and raised in the St. Albans neighborhood of Queens, New York, to an African American mother and an Afro-Honduran father.. Bodden went to Aviation High School in Long Island City, Queens. He went on to work for Lockheed Martin and McDonnell Douglas in Long Beach in the training department in the early 1990s.

== Career ==
Just for Laughs in Montreal provided the opportunity for Bodden's big break, opening the door for many other TV shows. He has been the host of the annual Just for Laughs festival in Bermuda over a dozen times.

He hosted the Speed TV program 101 Cars You Must Drive. He is also a host for America's Worst Driver. He also guest starred on Angel.

He has performed on numerous television shows, including The Tonight Show with Jay Leno, Late Night with Conan O'Brien, Make Me Laugh, Late Friday, The Late Late Show with Craig Kilborn, Comedy Central Presents, and It's Showtime at the Apollo. He is also a voice actor who has worked on Power Rangers: Lightspeed Rescue, Masked Rider, and O'Grady.

Bodden appears as a panelist on NPR's news quiz show Wait Wait... Don't Tell Me!. He has also been a guest on The Joe Rogan Experience and on The Adam Carolla Show.

He is a co-host of Inside the Vault on WGN America.

In 2011, he was a panelist on a BBC America year-end television debut special of Wait Wait... Don't Tell Me! He is also a recurring panelist currently on the Wait Wait... Don't Tell Me! weekly NPR show and podcast.

During 2014, he was a comedic panelist on Game Show Network's original series Mind of a Man.

In 2019, he released his special Heavy Lightweight on Amazon Prime Video.

Bodden has regularly appeared as a commentator for The Young Turks network.

== Filmography and discography ==
=== Stand-up comedy releases ===
Solo albums and TV specials
| Title | Release date | Debut medium |
|---|---|---|
| Seemed Like a Good Idea at the Time | March 6, 2001 | Audio CD |
| Tall, Dark and Funny | February 14, 2005 | DVD Video |
| Comedy Central Presents: Alonzo Bodden | July 8, 2005 | Television (Comedy Central) |
| Who's Paying Attention? | February 19, 2011 | DVD Video |
| He Had Me at Black | 16 May 2013 | Audio CD |
| Historically Incorrect | February 19, 2016 | Television (Showtime) |
| Man Overboard | July 27, 2018 | Audio CD |
| Heavy Lightweight | August 23, 2019 | Streaming TV (Prime Video) |
| Stupid Don't Get Tired | July 18, 2022 | Streaming TV (YouTube) |
| How Do You Spell Moth? | July 10, 2026 | Streaming TV (Dry Bar Comedy) |

=== Movies ===
- 8 Guys (2003) (short film)
- Bringing Down the House (2003)
- The Girl Next Door (2004)
- Scary Movie 4 (2006)
- National Lampoon's Totally Baked: A Potumentary (2007)
- Why We Ride (2013)

=== Television ===
- Angel (2003) - Eddie Rhodes
- America's Worst Driver (2010)
- Californication S07 (2014) - Alonzo
- Fresh Off the Boat (2018) - Mr. Carlson
- The Great American Joke Off (2023) - Himself (recurring panelist)
- Mr. Birchum (2024) - Don Gage

=== Voice-over ===
- Masked Rider – Ultivore (voice)
- Power Rangers: Lightspeed Rescue – Thunderon (voice)
- Fallout 76: Wastelanders – Aubrie Willem, Dontrelle Haines (voice)

== Family Feud Live ==
In 2019, Bodden was tapped to host Family Feud Live, a live traveling version of the game show Family Feud, which also featured celebrity "team captains" Brian Baumgartner, Cathy Rigby and "Grocery Store Joe" Amabile.

== Personal life ==
Bodden is a car and motorcycle enthusiast. In addition to an e92 BMW M3 and JCW Mini Cooper, Bodden owns many motorcycles, including a Triumph Rocket III, a Triumph Speed Triple, a Ducati 1098, a BMW HP2, and a Ducati Multistrada, and formerly owned a Honda CB400F. In 2010, Bodden highsided his Ducati 1098 while racing at Buttonwillow Raceway Park. The crash shattered his scaphoid, requiring surgeries and a bone graft to fix. In 2011, he had customizer Nick Anglada rebuild the bike in a bare aluminum and anodized gold palette.

On March 26, 2013, Bodden donated a kidney to his brother, who is three years older.

He moved to Las Vegas in 2024 and currently resides there.
