= Amy Dickinson =

American newspaper columnist

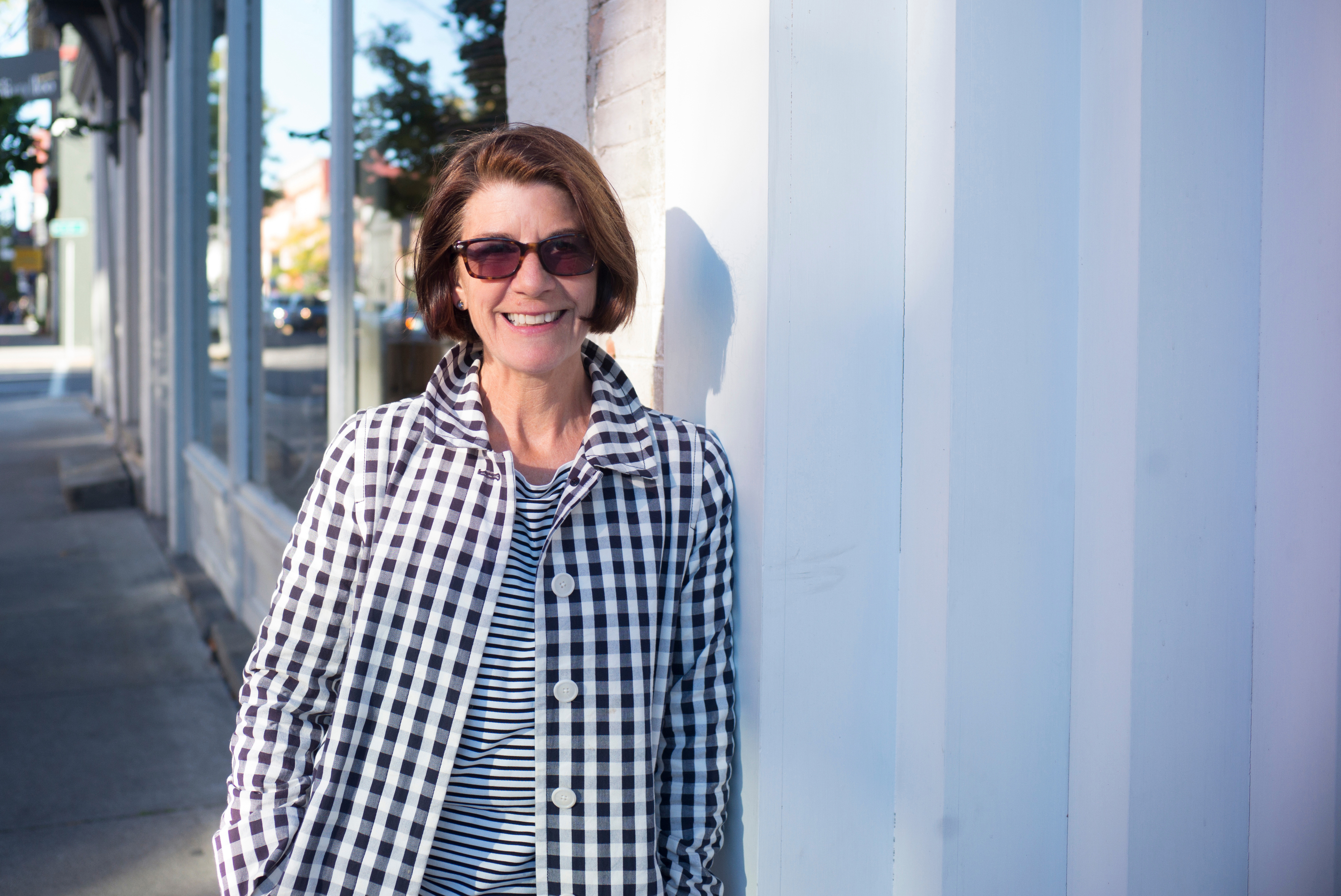
- Dickinson in Chicago (2008)
- Born: November 6, 1959 (age 66); Freeville, New York, U.S.
- Occupations: Author journalist
- Years active: 1980–present
- Spouses: Anthony Mason (1986–90); Bruno Schickel (2008–present)
- Children: Emily Mason

Amy Dickinson (born November 6, 1959) is a former American newspaper columnist who wrote the syndicated advice column Ask Amy. Dickinson has appeared as a social commentator on ABC's Good Morning America and NBC's The Today Show.

== Biography ==
Dickinson was born and raised on a small dairy farm in Freeville, New York. She attended Clark University in Worcester, MA, from 1977 to 1978 and transferred to Georgetown University. She married Anthony Mason, a CBS News correspondent, in 1986. They moved to London in 1987. A daughter, Emily, was born there in 1988. The couple divorced in 1990 and Dickinson and her daughter returned to the United States. Dickinson married Bruno Schickel, a builder from Dryden, New York, on August 16, 2008. Dickinson still lives in Freeville. She is a member of the Daughters of the American Revolution and was the millionth woman to join the organization.

== Career ==
Dickinson has worked as a journalist for NBC News. Her articles have appeared in such publications as The Washington Post, Esquire, and O. She wrote a column on family issues for Time, and produced a weekly column for AOL's News channels, drawing on her experiences as a single parent and member of a large, extended family.

In 2003, Dickinson succeeded Ann Landers (Esther Pauline "Eppie" Lederer) as the Chicago Tribune's signature advice columnist. Tribune Content Agency syndicated Ask Amy to newspapers around the world.

Dickinson is a frequent panelist on the radio game show Wait Wait... Don't Tell Me! that is distributed by NPR, and was a regular featured guest on Talk of the Nation. She has also appeared on Car Talk with questions about how to respond to car problems in her column.

On February 9, 2009, Dickinson's memoir, The Mighty Queens of Freeville: A Mother, a Daughter, and the Town That Raised Them, was released by Hyperion Books. It reached The New York Times bestseller list in two weeks, debuting at number 16.

In November 2016, Dickinson announced the release of her second memoir, "Strangers Tend to Tell Me Things: A Memoir of Love, Loss, and Coming Home," coming in March 2017 from Hachette Books.

On May 24, 2024, Dickinson announced her retirement from writing the "Ask Amy" column, with its final installment to be published at the end of June 2024. She asked readers to start sending letters to R. Eric Thomas, writer of the Asking Eric advice column. Her final column, which summarized her philosophy and thanked her colleagues, was published on June 30, 2024.

== Anti-gay letter and viral response ==
On Monday, November 18, 2013, Dickinson ran a letter from a parent who wanted his son to "stop being gay" because the parent found it embarrassing. It was signed "Feeling Betrayed." Dickinson responded:

Dear Betrayed: You could teach your son an important lesson by changing your own sexuality to show him how easy it is. Try it for the next year or so: Stop being a heterosexual to demonstrate to your son that a person's sexuality is a matter of choice — to be dictated by one's parents, the parents' church and social pressure.

I assume that my suggestion will evoke a reaction that your sexuality is at the core of who you are. The same is true for your son. He has a right to be accepted by his parents for being exactly who he is.

The letter and response became a sensation after being posted on Upworthy and BuzzFeed and tweeted by George Takei.

In an interview with GoPride.com, an LGBTQ website, Dickinson addressed the letter's popularity:

I've been saying the same thing over and over and over again. What's interesting is that social media has changed the equation so much. I could probably find Q & As similar to this from years ago, but because there wasn't Twitter and Facebook and George Takei didn't have 5 million followers, it was just confined to people who read the newspaper. Now, oh my God, it's unbelievable. I actually heard from people who said that the letter wasn't real and that I planted that letter so it would go viral. My response is, 'If I could make something go viral, I would do every day.' It's in the very nature of virality, you can't make it happen.

== A book on every bed ==
In 2009, Dickinson began asking her readers to wrap a book and put it on their children's beds on Christmas. Along with the Family Reading Partnership, "A Book on Every Bed" meant many children received books not only at Christmas but on birthdays or other holidays.

Later, Dickinson made the idea a way to honor the memory of her mother on her birthday, December 23. Dickinson asked readers of her column to give a book to a child on Christmas or whatever day they celebrated. She said it could be new or a favorite book, but it should be wrapped at the foot of the child's bed. The parent should read the book to the child after it is unwrapped. In 2019, Dickinson joined with Children's Reading Connection, started in Ithaca, New York.
