= CWH =

CWH may refer to:

- CWH is the ICAO airline designator for Canadian Warplane Heritage Museum, Canada
- CWH is the Amtrak station code for Cornwells Heights station in Pennsylvania, United States
- CWH is the United Kingdom National Rail Station Code for Crews Hill railway station
- the Centre for Workplace Health, United Kingdom
- the Central Washington Hospital, United States
- Canada's Worst Handyman (TV series) - CWH1 season 1, CWH2 season 2, CWH3 season 3
- Coarse woody habitat
- Chemist Warehouse in Australia, New Zealand, Ireland, China, and the United Arab Emirates
