= Canada's Worst Handyman 2 =

- Season 2
- Starring: Andrew Younghusband
- No. of episodes: 9

Release
- Original network: Discovery Channel Canada
- Original release: April 16 – June 11, 2007

Season chronology
- ← Previous; Canada's Worst Handyman Next → Canada's Worst Handyman 3

Canada's Worst Handyman 2 was the second season of the Canadian reality TV show Canada's Worst Handyman, which aired on the Discovery Channel. As with the past season, five contestants and their nominators enter the "Handyman Rehabilitation Centre," where a series of challenges await them. This year, the Handyman Rehabilitation Centre is once again located in Toronto, this time at The Foundry, a warehouse in the Corktown neighborhood. Unlike the previous season, when the focus was on home renovation, the focus of this season was on the increasing trend in garage and shed renovation. In each episode, contestants partake in a series of challenges, with one contestant being named the most improved handyman and another being named the worst. At the end of the series, the contestant with the worst shed overall is given the title of Canada's Worst Handyman. The five sheds, as well as one built by the experts, have been sold to the one unlucky and five lucky bidders on eBay, sight unseen. The winning bidders will also appear on the final episode of the series (which traditionally is a recap episode) as the shed is being delivered to them. The proceeds of the eco-shed sale goes to Habitat for Humanity Canada.

== Experts ==
- Jill Rydall, a licensed carpenter, was the first female member of the Sault Ste. Marie Carpenter's Union. She has over 20 years of experience under her belt, including 14 years as a construction teacher. She replaces Robin Lockhart, who served as the interior designer in the previous season.
- Greg House, a general contractor, is back for his second season as the show's resident contracting expert. He has experience in building both within Canada and internationally and has 35 years of experience under his belt, including 24 years of residential and commercial contracting.

== Contestants ==
- Terry Cress, a truck driver from Sault Ste. Marie, Ontario, is nominated by his friend, tech support professional Harvey Houle, for his never-ending endeavor into building a shed of his own, using cheap materials (including extension cords to wire his shed, reused wood and straightened-out nails) and tools. Cress takes pride in his skills and claims that his shed costs less than $50. At the beginning of the fifth episode, Harvey had to be hospitalized due to persistent back pain and was replaced with Terry's wife, Angie.
- Jaime García, 29, is a web designer from Regina, Saskatchewan who is meticulous in reading the directions but not acting on them. He is nominated by his mother-in-law, Sheilla Stengler, a plumbing business owner who, by her own admission, takes great pleasure in belittling and insulting Jaime whenever he makes any mistake. To make things worse, Jaime's wife, Kendra, who is pregnant with their fourth child (at the time of filming; she has since given birth) and, thus, unable to do any handiwork because of it, agrees with her mother.
- Jeff Gignac, a management consultant from Mississauga, Ontario, is a father whose sons have recently been taking an interest in tools. As the owner of a business, he specializes in delegation of duties, including letting his nominator, firefighter Fred Johnson, do all of his handiwork.
- Candace Landmark, a nurse's assistant from Calgary, Alberta, is a fan of many design and construction TV shows (including Flip This House and Holmes on Homes), but is very shy around lifting heavy objects, using tools and other basic construction know-how. Still, she believes that she can do things as seen on TV just because she has seen it done on TV and contends that she is better at the do-it-yourself process than her husband and nominator, Justin, a construction worker specializing in metalworking. It is later revealed during the Grouting Challenge that Candace is three months pregnant with her second child (at the time of filming; she has since given birth to a boy).
- Ruth Summersides, 55, is a retired teacher/psychologist from Qu'Appelle, Saskatchewan (near Regina) whose experience as a single mother of three has led her to numerous unsafe projects. Ruth is nominated by one of her two daughters, Michelle Pine, a call center supervisor. She has reportedly complained to the manufacturers about power tools and how she feels they are too big for her to use.

== Synopsis ==
Contestant	Nominator	1	2	3	4	5	6	7	8
Terry	Harvey/Angie	IN	IN	IMP	NOM	M/W	IN	IN	CWH
Candace	Justin	WORST	IMP	IN	IN	IN	WORST	IN	IN
Jaime	Sheilla	IN	IN	IN	IN	IN	IMP	WORST	IN
Jeff	Fred	IMP	IN	WORST	WORST	IN	IN	IN	IN
Ruth	Michelle	IN	WORST	IN	IN	IN	IN	IN	IN

CWH – The contestant is Canada's Worst Handyman.
WORST – The contestant is the worst of the episode.
NOM – The nominator of the contestant is the worst of the episode.
IN – The contestant was considered for the worst for this episode.
M/W – The contestant was named both the most improved and the worst for this episode.
IMP – The contestant is the most improved of the episode.
NOM – The nominator of the contestant is the most improved of the episode.
IMP - The contestant and their nominator are both the most improved for the episode.
WORST - The contestant and their nominator are both the worst for the episode.

== Episode 1: Starting from Scratch ==
Original airdate: April 16, 2007

In this episode, the five contestants arrive at the Handyman Rehabilitation Centre. Prior to entering rehabilitation, the contestants were asked to specify the dimensions of their shed, along with a birdhouse-sized replica. At the end of the episode, Jeff, by virtue of never having done anything considered handiwork prior to rehab and nailing three boards together in this episode during the skills evaluation, is deemed the most improved handyman of this episode, while Candace, whose self-proclaimed "renovation skills" contrasted with it taking her 171 tries and five minutes to hammer in a single nail, was deemed the worst. Her extra lesson was in the use of hammers of all sorts.

=== The Birdhouse ===
Prior to entering the Handyman Rehabilitation Centre, each contestant was asked to specify the dimensions of the shed they would like to build, with the only restriction that the total dimensions of the shed be no bigger than 7-foot-6-inch (2.29 m) by 13-foot-0-inch (3.96 m) by 9-foot-2-inch (2.79 m). Then, the contestants are asked to build a birdhouse-sized replica using 100-year-old barnboard.

- Terry: Terry had issues with splitting the wood, which caused him to nail the pieces back together, but in doing so, he nailed the pieces to his deck. His birdhouse was eventually completed with the help of a stapler and a reciprocating saw.
- Jaime: Jaime was constantly pressured by nominator Sheilla throughout the task. Although he had minor issues with splitting the wood while installing screws, he did take the time to meticulously measure.
- Jeff: Jeff nearly cuts his work surface in the process of cutting his wood with a jigsaw and he uses oversized screws to screw his pieces together, causing the wood to split.
- Ruth: Ruth had made numerous unsquare cuts from her skill saw and had numerous issues with splitting the wood (accidentally or on purpose). The end result is that her birdhouse has a significant number of holes.
- Candace: Candace, despite having no experience with power tools, is pressured by nominator, Justin, to use a skill saw to cut her wood. When she starts installing screws, Justin forces Candace to stop as she doesn't actually screw her pieces together.

=== The Reveal ===
Upon entering the Handyman Rehabilitation Centre, the shed frames, assembled by the show crew to the contestants' specifications, are revealed to the contestants (and their nominators) for the first time. They are also given their own color-coded areas: Candace in orange, Terry in blue, Jaime in yellow, Jeff in purple and Ruth in green. Ruth's, Jeff's and Candace's sheds are on one side of the warehouse, with Jaime's shed opposite Ruth's and Terry's shed opposite Jeff's. The area opposite Candace is used as the site for various challenges as well as the area where contestants "hang their head in shame" when they are named the worst of the episode.

- Terry: Terry's dream shed, at 12-foot (3.7 m) tall, was too tall for a roof to be installed (as it alone was nearly the height of the warehouse). With its large width and length, Terry was forced to settle for a shed half the size. Furthermore, Terry inexplicably asked for three different types of roof (flat, peaked and sloped) to be installed—a moot point considering the height of his shed.
- Jaime: Jaime's shed had only one major flaw, caused by changing his mind on the dimensions three times due to pressure from Sheilla. The flaw in question is that the peaked roof made the shed far too tall.
- Jeff: Jeff's shed, criticized by Terry and Jaime as being far too flimsy, had 44-inch (1,100 mm) between studs (which resulted in the entire shed being held up by a total of only six studs). His shed is also far too short, as it was only 6-foot-6-inch (1.98 m) in total height—meaning that, with the subfloor taken into account, that both Jeff and nominator Fred would not be able to stand in the shed. Jeff also chose to have a flat roof, which Andrew notes was an option specifically intended to catch out the handymen, as flat roofs have far too many problems (including far more water and snow buildup than their sloped counterparts) to be viable choices.
- Ruth: Ruth's shed is perfect for her 4-foot-11-inch (1.50 m) frame, which makes it too short for virtually everyone else (including Andrew, who worries that his shoulder would bump up against the roof.
- Candace: Candace's shed was specified ambiguously, having given an area ("7'4x10") instead of a length. Her resulting shed is a 7x10 shed with studs 6-inch (0.15 m) apart (far too close together and using far too much lumber), with a sloped roof three feet higher at the front (she originally intended her shed to be three feet wide, which she later told Andrew that it was meant to be three inches), meaning that the 11-foot (3.4 m)-tall shed is too tall for the warehouse door.

=== Skills Evaluation ===
In the skills evaluations, the contestants have up to 30 minutes to cut a 14-foot (4.3 m) board into three equal pieces, so that the laminated board can be used as a pedestal for their birdhouse replica sheds.

- Terry: Terry, apart from determining where to make his cut by trial and error (which did, however, get him to the correct measurement of 4 feet 8 inches (1.42 m) per piece), manages to cut and screw his pieces together without too much issue. He is also the fastest to finish at 12:36.
- Jaime: Jaime's strategy is to purposely undercut the wood and use the previous piece to cut his next piece. Although it gives him three pieces of equal size, he has four pieces overall. He had minor troubles in using the power drill to screw in his pieces, instead opting to install screws by hand. When that does not work out, he resorts to using only nails. Nevertheless, he finishes in 21:44.
- Jeff: Jeff takes a whole minute in staring at a measuring tape, although he uses a jigsaw to cut his pieces (although the technique is incorrect, as he nearly jackhammers his saw to make a cut). Jeff finishes in 28:23, although his lack of skills meant that very little was done correctly.
- Ruth: Ruth, with gardening gloves on, had accidentally mismeasured her boards, resulting in the third piece being shorter than the first two. When laminating the boards, she does not securely place her bits in the drill's chuck, causing her gloves to be trapped in the drill. Avoiding the gloves from then on, Ruth finishes in 20:07, but admits she needs rehabilitation.
- Candace: Although Candace figures out the correct length needed, cutting the boards proves to be quite the task, as she misuses her initial choice of a crosscut saw (by using the saw to cut forwards when in fact it is a back saw) and opts for a jigsaw that scared her. However, her biggest problem is laminating the cut boards: she could not even sink a single screw in due to the drill being set off-center to the screw and it took her 171 tries to hammer in a single nail. Because of this, she could not finish in the 30-minute time limit.

=== Building a Workbench ===
The contestants are introduced to the experts, who showed the contestants how to build their own workbench from pre-cut materials (including a $400 piece of bamboo board). The contestants are asked to build the workbench as shown by the experts in 90 minutes.

- Terry: Harvey did most of the grunt work in this challenge, especially after Terry had mounted his bamboo countertop from the top instead of from the bottom. The duo, however, did manage to finish the fastest at 79 minutes.
- Jaime: Jaime took the experts' instructions to heart, but Sheilla believes that he isn't following her instructions. Despite the struggle between the in-laws due to Jaime's slow and steady meticulousness and Sheilla's demand for more speed (which, at one point, forced Sheilla to be removed from Jaime's area), Jaime finishes in 83 minutes.
- Jeff: Jeff had issues operating a heavy drill and refused a smaller and lighter drill (although one was given to him anyway). No footage of him finishing the bench was shown, although he was on the final touchups when the 90 minutes were up.
- Ruth: Ruth continued to struggle with securing the drill bits in the drill (forcing the drill bit to be hammered out on numerous occasions), although this problem had been settled down when she was given a smaller and lighter drill. However, she manages to abandon the experts' step-by-step instructions, creating an incomplete bench that was nowhere near level or in one piece.
- Candace: Candace had problems with the drill being set on reverse and nearly breaks down prior to installing the legs. Justin manages to get most of the bench assembled for her and she was nearly complete thanks to his assistance when time expired.

=== Group Challenge: Building a Rain Catcher ===
The group challenge takes the contestants to the roof of the Handyman Rehabilitation Centre, where they are to build a rain catcher from plastic tubing, vapour barrier, T-connectors and a bucket. The rain catcher, in turn, will be needed to provide water to the sheds in upcoming challenges, as the Handyman Rehabilitation Centre lacks plumbing. Right after Andrew explains the challenge and gives the assembly instructions to Jaime, Jaime begins reading it, ignoring Andrew's instructions to drill a hole from the top of the bucket (which would haunt him later). The group challenge begins with everyone trying to agree on the size of the catcher, and everyone eventually agrees that the diameter at the top of the funnel should be eight feet. However, confusion between the circumference and the diameter of a circle results them in going with Jaime's advice and cutting 16 feet (4.9 m) of tubing—good only for a 5 feet (1.5 m)-diameter top. Because Jaime is the one with the manual and made the most important decisions to this point, he was named almost by consensus as the challenge's foreman (although Jaime was apparently unaware of this). Jaime's attempt to assert authority fails (and the bottom of the raincatcher was assembled using duct tape in the process) and he also does not listen to the advice of the others (Terry in particular) when they advised him to drill a hole in the bucket near the top—the part where Jaime had missed out when reading the instructions. Because of this, the rain catcher was deemed a failure.

== Episode 2: Electric Circus ==
Original Airdate: April 23, 2007

The episode begins with Andrew and Jaime repairing the bucket of the incorrectly built rain catcher (so that the hole in the bucket, drilled by Jaime in the first group challenge, is now at the top instead of at the bottom), needed in fact to do the very next challenge. The episode ends with Candace being named the most improved due to her redesigned shed, while Ruth was named the worst as she made unnecessary changes to her shed and did not do a single challenge correctly. Her extra lesson is not shown.

=== Group Challenge: The Barbecue Pit ===
In the episode's group challenge, Jeff must lead the contestants to build a barbecue pit, using reclaimed bricks, bags of mortar mix and water collected from their new rain catcher. The challenge begins with Jeff being the only person not to read the instructions in the mortar, leading the team to lay dry bricks with no gap for mortar between. When he is informed by Andrew that wet bricks bond better to mortar, the team simply continues to lay bricks, with wet bricks over dry ones (as opposed to starting over and having all wet bricks). Furthermore, there is very little mortar applied and the mortar is applied after the bricks are in place (as opposed to buttering the brick with mortar before setting the bricks in place). While Jeff, Ruth and Candace continue to lay bricks, Jaime uses the pointing trowel to do tuck pointing while Terry adds in ventilation for the barbecue pit by leaving holes in the brickwork. When the nominators arrive to see the contestants' progress, the nominators (Sheilla in particular) do not like the contestants' work so far in the challenge—in particular, Jeff had not used a level at all in the challenge (needed to ensure that each row of bricks are applied to a uniform height). Despite Jaime's last-ditch attempt to level the brickwork using said level (only to stop when he realizes that it is a pointless endeavour with multiple layers of brick already installed), when the challenge is over (after 82 minutes) and the nominators are asked to give a thumbs-up thumbs-down rating, the fire pit received five emphatic thumbs-downs—two each from the experts and one from Andrew.

=== The Countersink Challenge ===
Despite the camaraderie that had formed between the contests, nominators and even the crew, Jeff and Ruth have not gotten along well with each other: this is due to Ruth seeing Jeff as an arrogant chauvinist and Jeff having previously proclaimed that he could improve far better than any of the other four contestants. To settle the score, Jeff and Ruth decide on a race to see who could countersink one nail with fewer strokes. The race, with Andrew as referee and everyone else watching, was close wire-to-wire, but Ruth was declared the winner after video replay as it took Jeff two more strokes (which he had claimed was "for insurance") of the hammer to drive his nail home.

=== The Redesign ===
After some instruction on basic framing knowledge from Jill, each contestant could choose to redesign their sheds to new specifications. This was necessary for four of the contestants, whose sheds are either too tall for the warehouse door (Candace, Terry, Jaime) or would fail a building inspection (Jeff). These redesigned shed frames would then be assembled by the show's staff.

- Terry: Having half of his shed taken away in the first episode (leaving it with only three walls), as well as the fact that his two-storey shed lacked a roof, Terry's redesign was a necessity. His redesigned shed is eight feet tall, with a one-foot high sloped roof. Unfortunately, with his 8-inch (200 mm)-tall subfloor, his redesigned shed is still 6-inch (150 mm) too tall for the warehouse door.
- Jaime: Contending that the 9-foot-2-inch (2.79 m) height restriction is entirely arbitrary, Jaime decides to lower the roof of his shed by ten inches, which made it still 14-inch (360 mm) too tall.
- Jeff – Jeff decides to add the studs desperately needed to his building, as well as to make it taller. His new shed is 9-foot (2.7 m) from the warehouse floor to the shed's soffit, which means that his shed, with 6-inch (150 mm) high rafters (the flat unsloped roof is retained), is too tall for the warehouse door.
- Candace – Candace decides to take out a lot of her lumber and keep every fourth stud in her tightly studded shed, as well as lower her sloped roof by two feet (so that it is now one foot tall on the high side instead of three feet tall). She is the only person in the end to have her shed be under the height of the warehouse door at nine feet.
- Ruth: Although being the only contestant whose changes were not strictly necessary, Ruth decides to make her shed taller by keeping the roof unchanged but making her shed eight feet tall, leaving the shortest contestant with the tallest shed and far too high for the warehouse door.

=== The Tool Test ===
While the show's crew get busy on rebuilding the contestants' shed frames, the contestants themselves are given a simple test, administered by Jill, to see if they can identify 11 different handyman tools. Among the tools were bevels, coping saws, files, pliers, reciprocating saws and screwdrivers. Although very little of the test was shown, Jeff was the worst, having been able to identify three of the 11 tools.

=== Solar Panels ===
The contestants in this challenge are tasked to build a triangular frame that would house a solar panel, which would power two lightbulbs and two wall outlets in their sheds, within 60 minutes. To help them, they are given one prototype frame from which they can take and copy their measurements.

- Terry – Terry begins measuring for his base, but is frustrated when he constantly mismeasures. Frustrated by his jigsaw, Terry proceeds to use his crosscut saw to do his cutting. Harvey then uses his combination square to ensure that his base (and Terry's cuts) are truly square. However, he attaches the top cross piece without checking whether his sloped pieces are at the correct angle of 60°. After adjustments, Terry believes "close enough" is good enough, while Harvey disagrees. Harvey eventually wins out and Terry goes adjusting. He is eventually finished at 63 minutes, with all angles correct.
- Jaime – Jaime works at a feverish pace, with no issues besides Sheilla dropping subtle hints about whether his measurements were accurate or his joins were square. Like the other contestants, Jaime has trouble using his speed square to determine the correct angle. When he seeks Justin for advice on using it, he discovers that his angles are wrong and tries many times to fix the angle. Although he believes that Sheilla was no help at all, eventually, Jaime does run out of things to adjust and his final result is correct. He finishes with only two minutes left on the clock, the only person to do so correctly within the time limit.
- Jeff – Jeff begins by making the measurements, which are marked down on the wood by his nominator, Fred, who also does the cutting work for Jeff. Although Fred does his best to assist Jeff in building the frame, his frame is not square or at the correct angle. Although they try to use a shim to prop up the solar panel so that it is at the correct angle, Jeff is given a failing grade. He is also the first to finish at 47 minutes.
- Candace – Because it took her five whole minutes to make a single cut in her wood with her crosscut saw in the skills evaluation (only to give up and use the power tools), Justin is doing the cutting for Candace. Just soon after Justin begins assembling the frame himself, leaving Candace out of the picture. This, however, did not mean that she was done—neither saw that her vertical boards were cut too short (meaning that their angles were not correct either). Although both eventually notice this, Candace, even with Justin's help, is puzzled by where to place the speed square so that she could measure the proper angles. After 70 minutes, Candace gets the correct frame, but is clueless as to why the frame is correct.
- Ruth – Ruth begins by making measurements, although the marking on her wood is a barely visible dot rather than a whole line across her lumber. Thus, when she begins cutting, her pieces are not square. When she begins to use a combination square for marking a line across her lumber, Michelle contends that she is not using it correctly. Ruth also chooses to ignore measuring the angles. When she declares herself finished, Andrew contends that her frame is not square and her angle is incorrect due to the lack of measurement, which she addresses by using shims. She finishes in 68 minutes, but the frame is not correct.

=== Electrical Wiring ===
The next step in shed building is electrical work, which they are given tutoring by Jill (who states simply, "White-on-white, black-on-black, no sparky-sparky" on how to properly connect wires). In this challenge, the contestants must wire their shed by adding an electrical panel, which would be connected to the solar panels (by Jaime, who volunteered), as well as connect two $90 energy-efficient lightbulbs on one series circuit to it (the entire electrical setup, including the solar panel, is over $2,300 per shed). If, at the end of the challenge, the lighting is faulty, Rob MacDonald, the show's own lighting technician who bet eventual "winner" Keith Cole ten dollars that he wouldn't finish the wallpapering before the time ran out in the final exam in the previous season (a bet Andrew also took, by the way), would help the contestants fix their faulty wiring. When the solar panel captures energy, it is stored in a car battery and then through an inverter, which would then be used to power their sheds (as well as charge their power tools in later challenges). To aid the contestants in their electrical work, detailed diagrams have been given. The contestants are free to place their rectangular box (for the switch) and octagon boxes (for their lights) anywhere in their shed.

- Terry – Terry, who had wired his "man-shed" back home with extension cords, installs his light boxes so that it is not recessed, meaning that the light box will be visible even after the lights are installed and the shed is finished. Although Terry fixes this, he makes another error in not extending the light box from the roof rafters. Terry is further puzzled by the presence of a ground wire, adding to the confusion of how the lights and the battery should be wired up to the panel. In the end, though, Terry solves all his issues and finishes his wiring correctly in 122 minutes. However, he never got around to fixing his octagon box positions.
- Jaime – Jaime installs his rectangular box so that they extend too far from the wall (one and a half inches instead of half an inch) and installs his light boxes at the very top of his shed, on the ridgeboards (meaning that it is not recessed in the rafters either). Jaime also makes the mistake of attaching a black wire to a white one while wiring his lights, which (while Jaime is fixing the wiring) infuriates her to the point that Sheilla stops helping her nominee, leaving their work area. No footage of Jaime working after Sheilla leaves is shown, although Jaime proceeds to connect the solar panels after he is finished. Before his own test (for which Sheilla is present), however, Andrew sees that his switch is already in the on position—from Jaime having installed the switch upside-down. Despite this minor mistake, Jaime's work is finished and correct after 129 minutes.
- Jeff – Jeff begins by installing his boxes so that they are flush to the edge of the wood, rather than extending them out by a half-inch (to account for the finished wall). When drilling holes in his studs for his electrical, Jeff does not realize that his drill is in reverse and prompts Fred to try doing what he could not do after a whole minute. Harvey goes through in seconds after setting Jeff's drill back to forward. No further footage of Jeff's work is shown, although he is finished by the time Jaime has finished connecting the solar panels to the sheds. Jeff's electrical work, by the time it is put to the test, fails, giving him an overall failing grade after 165 minutes of work. Jeff's mistake, as found by Rob, was that the wire that connects the lights to his panel is far too loose.
- Candace – Candace is easily confused as to where she should begin, much less where to install her boxes. After a moment of inspiration, Candace begins in earnest by having Justin install the boxes. After wiring is done, Candace makes another mistake when trying to install her light bulbs, snapping the lightbulb in half when twisting the bulb into the socket, which she discovers when she asks for Justin's assistance. Crestfallen over the loss of an expensive lightbulb, Candace begins to break down, prompting Justin to finish the electrical work for her. Because of the broken bulb, her circuit does not function at all, even after the two bulbs are switched around. After 159 minutes, her effort only gets her a failing grade. Rob finds the fault in their wiring, ironically enough, in the socket with the broken bulb.
- Ruth – Ruth begins by installing her switch box higher than her head, and her light box higher up the wall (which would create shadows). When she drills holes in her studs to allow wire to pass through, she complains that her drill is slow, only to realize that her drill was on reverse when Michelle asks. Ruth is far from finished by the time the other sheds have finished their electrical tests. Eventually, Rob is brought in to finish Ruth's wiring, taking half an hour to fix 12 mistakes that already exists in Ruth's wiring work. Eventually, after 233 minutes, Ruth's wiring is complete.

After the electrical, the final evaluations are made. Greg notes that Ruth's fixtures are too low for her shed, while Greg and Jill note down Jeff's flat unsloped roof (flat roofs are slightly sloped so as to allow water on the roof to run off). Greg's and Jill's critique of Candace's shed is that the lights were installed in the wrong places (which, when they were on, would create shadow), while the criticism against Jaime is that he made the smallest change in the height of his shed (needing a two-foot lowering of his original shed to make the 9-foot-2-inch (2.79 m) height limit). Finally, the experts' critique of Terry's shed is that much of the work done so far is not his own work—and the work that Harvey has put in is not too great, either. As for the barbecue pit, it is still not in one solid piece after several days of the mortar curing (as Andrew demonstrates, he is able to take apart pieces of the brickwork with his own hands).

== Episode 3: Sealing the Deal ==
Original Airdate: April 30, 2007

In this episode, the five contestants continue building their sheds by installing a window as well as finishing their shed exterior by adding insulation and vapour barrier. At the end of the episode, Terry is named the most improved despite his noticeable imperfections, as he was the only one other than Candace to finish all of their tasks (Candace doing so due largely to the work that Justin had done). On the other end, Jeff was named the worst due to his self-proclaimed perfectionism and his actual results leaving much to be desired, as well as refusing help from others when it was needed. Jeff's extra task is to name all of the imperfections in his own shed.

=== Framing a Window ===
After being taught another lesson in framing by Jill, the contestants must frame for a window in their shed.

- Terry – Although Terry is clueless as to how to approach this challenge, he eventually gets started, but makes the mistake of using the finger-joined wood (not designed to be secured horizontally) as his window sill. He also wants an asymmetric frame, but is convinced otherwise by Harvey. In the end, though, it is mentioned that either his window or Jaime's window is slightly too large for their frame.
- Jaime – The tension between Jaime and Sheilla goes into a boiling point in this challenge: first, Sheilla criticizes Jaime's use of cut pieces as a template for cutting other pieces. Then, Jaime rearranges the studs in his shed to make the window frame fit.
- Jeff – Little footage is shown of Jeff's framing, but it is noted that he made his window opening too tight.
- Candace – Although Candace's framing goes off without too many problems, they are only informed of an error in their top plate (using one 2x4 instead of two laminated ones) when they are nearly done. Not wanting Candace to fail, Justin takes charge of the work in fixing this mistakes, as well as performing a test fit of their window. Candace eventually finishes her window in 91 minutes (while nearly avoiding injury when their old top plate nearly hit Candace in the mouth), but it was Justin that did the majority of the work.
- Ruth – Ruth begins by cutting the studs in the hope of shrinking the cut-out hole with more lumber to make the window fit. Her resulting hole is large enough to accommodate two windows, largely as she nearly cuts off all the studs in one wall of her shed, but also as she fails to recognize that inches are divided into 16ths and not tenths on a measuring tape.

=== Plywood Sheeting ===
Before installing the window, the exterior must be covered in plywood. As per Candace's suggestion, however, similar to the Switcheroo episode from the previous season, contestants will be assisted by someone else's nominator.

- Terry – Terry's shed was in the best position to be easy covered, due to his shed's studs being 16-inch (410 mm) on centre. However, when paired with Sheilla, Terry made several mistakes in cutting the plywood so that the pieces will not fit together properly. This is evident in the piece under the window, where he repeatedly cut down his plywood to size. In the end, his admittedly patchwork sheeting is full of self-described "jigsaw puzzles."
- Jaime – Jaime is paired with Harvey. Little footage is shown of their work, except that in order for the sheeting to fit his adjusted frame without cutting the plywood sheets down, he does so by moving more studs around. The duo finish in 211 minutes.
- Jeff – Jeff, whose relationship with Ruth has been adversarial, is paired with Ruth's nominator, Michelle. Despite being told that the shed should be covered from the bottom-up, Jeff instead starts from the top and working their way down, with him on a ladder while Michelle is under the ladder and propping up the plywood. Eventually, Andrew pulls Michelle out for her own safety, leading Jeff to refuse help from a helpful Michelle. In fact, Jeff proceeds to drown out Michelle with earplugs... which were put in wrong. Eventually, Fred helps Jeff complete his sheeting after he finishes helping Candace, but it makes Michelle feel left out due to both of them ignoring her.
- Candace – Candace is paired with Fred, although very little footage of Candace's work was done beyond the need to cut sheets down to size.
- Ruth – Ruth is paired with Justin. Due to Justin's determination to help Ruth succeed (she had yet to complete a challenge successfully at this point), Ruth becomes the first to finish in 192 minutes—correctly to boot.

=== Installing the Window ===
With the plywood exterior, the contestants now have to test their work from the previous two challenges by installing the window.

- Terry – It is, in fact, Terry's shed, not Jaime's, that is slightly too large, when Terry and Harvey discover a gap in the left side of their window (which Harvey deems as "unfixable"). Because of this, Terry's installation is deemed incomplete.
- Jaime – Jaime's major mistake is in his unlevel windowsill and the fact that he installs his shims parallel to the sill (instead of perpendicular). Still, he does finish in 19:02.
- Jeff – Jeff's installation is going swimmingly until Jeff and Fred decide to screw their window into their shim (which would cause the shim to split). Then, Fred, believing that the screws that came into the window were too small (due to believing that the screws should be flush with the window's inside frame—and hence the predrilled holes are too big), proceeds to void the window's warranty by drilling holes next to the window's predrilled holes. When informed by Andrew of Fred's mistake, though, they do manage to finish.
- Candace – Due to their previous work, including a perfect test fit, it only takes Candace two minutes to install the shims, with the rest of her 18:38 installation devoted to screwing the window in place (and being slightly confused over the fact that the screws are being installed through open space).
- Ruth – Ruth's extra large hole cannot accommodate her window and by the time the window can even remotely fit, the window frame now has four 2x4s on all sides, yet there is still a gap big enough to put two fingers in on all sides. Ruth's solution of using a lumber shim does not help either.

=== Insulation ===
The contestants must insulate their sheds, using batt insulation created from recycled denim. The insulation comes in two different widths—one for 24-inch (610 mm) on centre frames (needed for Candace in particular) and one for 16-inch (410 mm) on centre frames. Following the denim insulation, they must then spray form all of their remaining spaces—particularly in the area around their window and shed door.

- Terry – Terry's insulation job is remarkably easy due to his convenient 16-inch (410 mm) frame, but Harvey manages to replicate the boneheaded decision Merle Auger made in the previous season's Upholstery Challenge when he cuts himself while cutting down insulation with a utility knife. He also nearly forgets to install insulation into the corners of his shed. Harvey also makes the mistake of getting spray foam all over his hands, as well as not shaking the can of spray foam before using it.
- Jaime – Jaime begins by obtaining a bag for 16-inch (410 mm) frames and a bag for 24-inch (610 mm) frames, believing both bags were for 16-inch (410 mm) frames—a moot point, though, with Jaime's adjusted studs taken into account. Jaime is forced to cut every piece he installs down to fit. His mistake in the spray foam was using the can right-side up instead of upside-down.
- Jeff – Little footage is seen of Jeff's insulation work, except for using many pieces of cut-down insulation to fit and not using masks while installing (as denim insulation tends to raise dust).
- Candace – Beyond overstuffing certain insulation spaces, little footage is seen of Candace's work, although she is shown meticulously reading the spray foam instructions.
- Ruth – Due to not taking her medication (needed to treat a head injury from the past), Ruth suffers a seizure while insulating, due to the increased temperature in the shed from insulation and the hot lights. While Michelle and Rob (who is also the head safety officer) help her recover, the other contestants (and their nominators), after finishing their own insulation and learning of Ruth's plight, help Ruth complete her insulation in ten minutes.

=== Vapour Barrier ===
Without any environmentally friendly solution around vapour barrier to stop air movement, the contestants must install their (non-recycled) plastic on top of their insulation. Little footage of the process is seen overall, except that nearly all teams deploy their vapour barrier vertically rather than horizontally (horizontally would allow a continuous barrier around the shed) and that nearly all sheds had problems securing the vapour barrier in the corners. In the end, Jaime's shed is the only one with good vapour barrier (after 55:08), while the others were drafty.

=== Group Challenge: Picnic Tables ===
In this group challenge, Candace must lead the contestants in assembling two identical picnic tables from a schematic. Although Candace makes a concerted effort in reading the instructions, she has difficulty in processing them, leading to the rest of the team being idle and trying to help her understand the instructions. Although after 50 minutes they manage to cut all of the pieces of wood to perfection, Candace is further confused by how and where to drill holes to connect the pieces together, leading to the team finishing neither table within the specified time.

In the final critique, Jaime's main critique was that his sheeting was not secure, his corners were badly done, and that he had rearranged his studs in both his framing and sheeting; he also didn't clean up afterwards, including leaving a ladder in the doorway, which meant that his shed was no longer a safe workplace (with Jill even refusing to enter his shed). The main criticism against Terry's work was the gap in his window from his installation, as well as inadequate support for his window frame, while the critique against Jeff's shed was on both an incomplete vapour barrier job and loose sheeting. Ruth's shed had major structural problems from the window frame which could not house a window (with Greg claiming that the window would never fit), while Candace's critique was localized to one area where her 24-inch (610 mm) insulation was not wide enough for a gap next to the window that was slightly over 24-inch (610 mm), causing the insulation to droop and the vapour barrier to bulge.

== Episode 4: Clear as Mud ==
Original Airdate: May 7, 2007

The episode begins with the contestants being informed that their sheds have been sold on eBay to the highest bidder. Surprisingly, all of the contestants and nominators took to the news well, with Candace even asking how much each shed was worth. However, Harvey's back pain issues, persistent throughout the series so far, is too much for him to handle and he has to be carried away on a stretcher. Although he eventually recovers (earning him the title of "most improved," joining David Hawe from the previous season as the only nominators to be named the most improved), his back pain means that he will be going home to rest instead of continuing to assist Terry. As such, Terry is forced to do many of the challenges in this episode alone, although he is given some assistance by Sheilla and Andrew. As for the worst, Jeff becomes the first contestant to date to be named the worst for two consecutive episodes. His extra lesson is not shown, as Harvey reads another poem.

=== Drywalling ===
The contestants must drywall the walls of their shed. The experts will assist in installing one wall (not the wall with the window) in each shed.

- Terry – Due to Harvey's back pain, Terry must rely on assistance from Andrew and Sheilla. However, his main mistake (which he eventually realizes) was installing one piece of drywall in his windowed wall backwards. Terry also makes the mistake of having four pieces of drywall (including his backwards piece) meeting in one part of the wall, creating a structural weakness, as well as installing his backwards piece over the window and cutting the drywall later (instead of cutting the drywall first). Terry finishes his work in 2:29, but he never gets around to fixing the piece that he got on backwards.
- Jaime – Jaime has difficulty in hitting his studs, having moved them in previous challenges. Nevertheless, he finishes drywalling in 2:23.
- Jeff – No footage was shown in Jeff's shed, but he finishes in 2:47.
- Candace – Candace's slow pace frustrates Justin, especially as how drywall pieces are cut confuses her (believing that she needs a special tool to cut drywall and not realizing that she is, in fact, holding and using a utility knife while making the statement) and the proper procedure often eludes her even as she is saying it (believing that there is no way to drywall around the window other than to measure and cut the drywall, which, although she is unaware of it, is correct). Justin takes matters into his own hands after seeing Candace take six minutes to cut a piece of drywall with a drywall saw, literally finishing the drywalling for Candace: while it took Candace 2:05 to cover a small section of a wall, it takes Justin 42 minutes to do the rest of the shed.
- Ruth – Ruth and Michelle quickly go to a war of words during the drywalling, but although they make up, their drywall remains incomplete.

=== Clay Primer ===
Although three sides of the shed will be plastered, the side with the window will be covered in a clay wall treatment, to be installed later. Right now, though, primer must be put up so that the clay will stick to the wall and the primer takes five hours to dry. Jaime is puzzled as to why this is going up in the first place, while Candace has trouble opening the bucket of primer. To prevent Justin from "butting in," he is consigned to a back room to watch alongside the experts while Candace does the actual priming job alone. No other footage is shown other than Ruth, Candace and Jaime using rollers when the instructions state that brushes should be used.

=== Tiling ===
After being given some instruction on how to tile by Greg, the contestants must now tile a small corner of their shed, where toilets will be installed in a later challenge. These recycled glass tiles come in 36 one-inch squares, held together by a piece of plastic and each contestant is given tiles that match their workspace colors (except for Jeff's red tiles and Jaime's gray ones). The thinset mortar provided is also fast-drying, completely setting in eight hours. One mistake made by nearly everyone is that everyone uses a whole bag of mortar when only one-sixth of a bag is needed.

- Terry – Terry is caught by Sheilla doing incorrect things on multiple occasions—first, his water to mix ratio is incorrect (Terry having believed that the ratio is the same as that for grout), the fact that he did not use a notched trowel to apply the mortar to the wall and finally when the gap between his tile sheets is different from the gap between the tiles on the same sheet. Terry quickly fixes all of these and is done correctly in 60 minutes.
- Jaime – Jaime has trouble keeping his tiles on the wall, largely due to his grooves from the notched end of his trowel being not deep enough.
- Jeff – Jeff has issues with tiling largely from not using the notched trowel to create the grooves needed to hold his tiles in place, causing mortar to fill the gaps between tiles. To rectify the problem of falling tiles, Jeff pushes the tiles together, leaving no room for grout.
- Candace – Candace's defense to using the whole bag was that the bag merely provided instructions for mixing the whole bag with water, and not wanting to mess around with the ratios. Applying the thinset also confuses her: when Justin reads the instructions on how to use her trowel, she misinterprets using the trowel at a 45° angle to the wall as turning her trowel diagonally and applying the mortar with her trowel flat on the wall. Eventually, Justin takes over again in an effort to get Candace to finish.
- Ruth – Ruth starts on the mortar and the tiles simultaneously, causing her to not use the trowel to create the grooves needed to hold the tiles in place, causing the mortar to fill the gaps between tiles and also causing her tiles to fall. Frustrated by her work, Michelle pulls off her tiles and tries to put them on again.

=== Plastering ===
In this challenge, plaster is applied to the three remaining walls of the sheds.

- Terry – Terry's mix is too wet from using too much water, but little footage is shown of the plaster being applied.
- Jaime – Before Jaime starts plastering, he wants to further secure his drywall with more screws. As they move on, Sheilla insists on covering the mesh tape that had covered the seams with paper tape, which is a mistake (although Sheilla realizes this but refuses to admit). Sheilla is also aggressive with the tape, accidentally plastering over the primed wall (meaning that the clay wall treatment will not stick to the wall now that there is plaster on it).
- Jeff – Jeff's mix is too gritty from having used too much plaster, but little footage is shown of the plaster being applied.
- Candace – Candace's emotions get the better of her, causing her to break down. She recovers enough, though, to finish the challenge while doing most of the work herself.
- Ruth – Ruth begins by using a scrap piece of metal instead of a palette to apply the plaster and later uses her finger, both of which angers Andrew. Little footage of Ruth's work is shown from that point on.

=== Clay Wall Treatment ===
At the end of their last challenge, much of the unused plaster and thinset mortar had settled and hardened (with one even having their notched trowel stuck in their hardened thinset mortar). The contestants begin the challenge of applying the clay plaster over their primed wall by cleaning up their wasted products, totaling over 100 pounds. Again, the contestants use a whole bag (which is far too much) each, mixing a combined 215 pounds of clay (Jaime and Jeff mixing 50 pounds, while Terry and Candace mix 40 pounds of clay and Ruth with 35 pounds)-- nearly a pound of clay for every square foot of wall in the sheds. In retrospect, Jaime states that they would have been better off mixing one bag together and sharing the mortar.

- Terry – Very little footage of Terry's work is shown.
- Jaime – Because of Sheilla's overzealousness with the drywall tape, the clay will not stick to parts of Jaime's wall. Nevertheless, they manage to finish the wall with reasonable consistency.
- Jeff – Jeff begins by applying the plaster inconsistently using the notched side of his trowel, but soon realizes the mistake when told by Andrew. The end result is that there are trowel marks on his wall.
- Candace – Candace lets Justin control the consistency of the clay mixture, which results in it being entirely too thin (when told that it needs to be the consistency of pudding, Candace is noted in asking "What kind of pudding do you eat?"). Justin, on the other hand, believes that everyone else is having their clay mixed too thick. In the end, their clay is so thin that Justin remarks that it would be easier to spray the clay onto the wall rather than using a trowel.
- Ruth – Little footage is shown of Ruth's work, but it is noted that her clay mixture is too thick.

=== Group Challenge: Building a Doghouse ===
Along with Ruth and Michelle, Ruth's dog, Dica, had also made the trip to the Handyman Rehabilitation Centre, but because of safety concerns, she isn't allowed on set while challenges are being done. In order to give Dica a home away from home, Terry leads the team in building Dica a new doghouse. As leader, though, Terry delegates much of the leadership work to Jaime and Jeff, while he gets down and does the work. Due to miscommunication, Jaime and Terry both make sub floors for the shed, although Terry later uses Jaime's sub floor rather than his own. The framing also goes up without a hitch, as is the exterior plywood. In the end, Dica's new doghouse is a mini-shed (not unlike Terry's own, but in Ruth's green color) with a door that may be slightly too small. Although Andrew has doubts about whether Dica would accept the doghouse, Dica nevertheless nestles comfortably in her new home, making the challenge a success.

In the final evaluation, Ruth's main critique in the episode is that her plaster job was horrible (which would require many hours of sanding with a power sander and many coats of plaster to fix) and that she had used too much mortar to tile, while Candace's main critique was that she did not keep her workplace clean. The hammer falls hard on Jeff, though, as the experts thought that he made the largest number of mistakes.

== Episode 5: In Too Deep ==
Original Airdate: May 14, 2007

At the start of the episode, Angie is brought in to replace Harvey, who has gone home to nurse his back. Angie's first impressions were of surprise: after seeing Terry's shed for the first time, Angie was impressed as the work seemed to come from a competent handyman. At the end of the episode, Terry is named both the most improved and the worst for the episode: the most improved because, despite the usual husband-wife interactions causing trouble, Angie, ironically enough, caused Terry to do more things correctly. However, he is named the worst when, given the opportunity to finish unfinished work, Terry took a pass (although Angie did some work in Terry's shed during this time). He is the first contestant to be named most improved twice and is also the first to be named both most improved and the worst in the same episode. His extra work involves uninstalling his partially installed urinal and replacing it with Ruth's toilet.

=== Grouting ===
In this challenge, the contestants must grout their tiles, using grout designed to set in 15 minutes. Meanwhile, the nominators place a second coat of plaster on the wall.

- Terry – Terry's grout job goes well, due to Angie taking charge of the grouting while Terry himself takes care of the plastering. Despite this, Terry takes care of cleaning the tiles off and adding grout to fix minor imperfections, resulting in a good grout job.
- Jaime – Jaime makes the mistake of mixing the grout first before peeling the plastic off his tiles, meaning that his grout had already set when his plastic is partly off. Meanwhile, Sheilla, bored with Jaime, visits Terry's shed, where Andrew invites her to take his role, even giving her his black leather jacket. Sheilla continues to torment Terry while Jaime works in peace.
- Jeff – Not much of Jeff's work is shown, other than using grout to adhere tiles that had fallen off his wall. Because of this and the fact that he did not do a good job of wiping down his tiles, he gets a failing grade, as the tiles will eventually fall off and his tiles will not appear clean.
- Candace – Candace is confused by the grout instructions, but eventually manages to apply grout after accidentally letting the grout set while peeling out the plastic sheets that held the glass tiles together. Although the job was a failure in the sense that her grout is too thin (having mixed more water to try and liquefy the hardened grout), the biggest news to come out of Candace's shed is that she reveals she is three months pregnant with her second child.
- Ruth – Ruth's grout job was termed incomplete largely because she had used too much mortar to apply the tiles (that resulting from peeling the tiles off and reapplying them in the previous episode). Although a thinset mortar saw was given to her in order to clean up the mortar that had accumulated between the tiles, the effort to clean up the tiles so that it would be ready for grout far exceeded the time limit.

=== Group Challenge: The Hot Tub ===
As Harvey is absent, Angie takes over foreman duties and leads the five contestants into building a wood-fired hot tub from a pre-fab kit. The contestants have three hours to build the tub, while it takes three hours to fill the tub with water and another three hours to heat the water. Thus, at the end of the day, the contestants could finally enjoy the tub they built... if it was built right. Before Angie even begins reading the instructions, the men begin trying to assemble the cedar staves around the hot tub, attaching the slats to the base. This is correct, but caulking must be added to seal the joint so as to prevent the water from leaking. The completed tub has 43 staves, but, because the later staves were fitted in using a mallet while the earlier ones were not, the hot tub is assembled in two discontinuous portions rather than in one piece. As a result, there is enough room for all but one stave, and any attempt to jam the last stave in resulted in the stave splitting. Although they try to work around it by using the supplied metal rings to tighten the existing staves, this reduces the diameter of the tub, making it impossible to fit wooden benches meant to fit in the interior of the tub. While Ruth and Candace mull over how to trim the benches to fit, Terry and Jeff focus on assembling the plumbing, which is initially correct even though neither had read the kit's instructions. However, Terry's fanaticism over using every part (even if the instructions state that not all parts would be needed) causes Terry to install valves and connections everywhere, which were not secured using glue. In the end, the hot water intake from the heater to the tub has a section travelling straight upwards. When only 15 minutes remain, the other four nominators enter to try to move things along. Sheilla, in particular, is trying to force everyone to work. By this time, everyone agrees that finishing the benches is a futile effort and are resigned to a leaking tub. By the time the tub is ready (at the end of the episode), the men all try the tub out in front of Candace, Ruth and the nominators. Although everyone enjoys the time, the tub, admittedly, is a failure.

=== Tongue-in-Groove Ceiling ===
The contestants have two hours to vapour barrier and line their ceiling with tongue-in-groove ceiling boards.

- Terry – Terry's main mistake was in not staggering his ceiling boards, causing all his boards to end at the same rafter. Although he acknowledges that he made a mistake (especially after seeing the work in Candace's shed and Jaime's shed), he refuses to start over after spending an hour on his erroneous construction. His ceiling work is incomplete at the end of the two hours.
- Jaime – Jaime's work begins well, but Sheilla is removed from Jaime's workspace when she attempts to hit him over the head with one of the boards, an even more dangerous act considering he was stood at the top of a ladder at the time. He does eventually get help from Justin after finishing Candace's shed (mainly in cutting boards down) and the two finish with seconds to spare.
- Jeff – Jeff staggers his boards, but does not cut them so that the boards end at rafters, resulting in holes in the ceiling (where the boards end but do not meet the rafters). His ceiling is incomplete after two hours.
- Candace – Because Candace had revealed to everyone that she was three months pregnant with her second child earlier, she is banned from using ladders, meaning that Justin is forced to take up much of the work. Candace, though, absolutely insists on trying to do the work herself, although is convinced by Justin to let him handle the work (letting Candace order him around) when she gets disoriented while atop a ladder. It goes without saying that Justin finishes the work correctly in 1:42, which was also the fastest time.
- Ruth – Ruth, because her shed is the tallest and is over twice her height, had troubles using a ladder and, even with Sheilla's help, did not finish her ceiling.

=== Toilets and Urinals ===
In this challenge, the contestants must install either a urinal (for the men) or a toilet (for Candace and Ruth) on top of their tile, while the nominators prime the shed. The toilets are specially designed to turn human waste into compost for flower beds, while the urinals are entirely waterless (the only maintenance required is having to replace a filter every 7,000 uses). At the end of the challenge, the contestants are given an hour to finish any work from previous challenges that were incomplete.

- Terry – Terry, although initially stumped by the installation instructions (going so far as to ask Jaime and Jeff for help) spends his time on ensuring that his urinal is level, even alienating his wife in the process. Although they do kiss and make up, none of Terry's exterior hookups are made. Terry, however, declines the extra hour, believing that he can make up for his work at another time and takes an hour-long smoke break instead. Angie, though, does some work in his shed, believing that his decision will come back to haunt him.
- Jaime – Jaime's urinal is complete and functional in 1:47, although the urinal itself is not level and his exterior vent pipe is at ground level instead of in the air. No footage was shown of Jaime's work in the extra hour.
- Jeff – No footage was shown of Jeff's work in installing the urinal, although he claims that the installation was incompletely simply because it was beyond him. In his extra hour, Jeff finishes his ceiling.
- Candace – Candace begins on the right track, but admits to making two mistakes: first was using silicone to adhere the vent pipe when the toilet was not installed, and second was installing a drainage pipe straight through a load-bearing stud. Nevertheless, Candace manages to finish the task in 1:47, with her as much involved as Justin. No footage was shown of Candace's work in the extra hour.
- Ruth – Ruth had made no progress in installing her toilet (due to having drilled through a stud for her drainage pipe and then getting her drill bit stuck within the tiles) and even going so far as to ask for it to be removed in the extra hour. In her extra hour, Ruth makes another attempt at installing her window.

In the final evaluation, Greg and Jill also note that by this point installing the window for Ruth's shed (now that the hole has been narrowed down yet again and the window has parts broken off) will still not fit, while Terry's shed is inconsistent at best (the grout job and the level urinal were both positives but the rest of the work was incomplete). In Jaime's shed, the main critique is that Jaime had not cleaned off his tiles prior to installing the toilet, meaning that at this point it would be difficult (if not impossible) to get the tiles clean. No critiques were shown on Candace's or Jeff's sheds.

== Episode 6: The Finishing Touches ==
Original Airdate: May 21, 2007

The episode begins with a lighthearted rib: because of Terry's surprising "most improved" title from the previous episode, someone (presumably Andrew) put on a "kick me" sign behind Terry, causing nearly everyone (cast and crew) to kick Terry in the rear. It would be not until part way through the first challenge when Terry finds out (for Angie had also known about this and had kept quiet). In this episode, the experts focus on the fact that two persons are working on a shed at a time, and decide to name both a contestant and their nominator as the most improved and another pair the worst. For the most improved, the relationship between Jaime and Sheilla had gone over the edge, but, as a result, they completed their next challenge correctly in uncharacteristic silence. On the flip side, the duo of Candace and Justin is named the worst because of Justin's continual butting-in and Candace's often-futile attempts to take charge, resulting in Justin doing much of the work. The resulting picture of the pair as the worst is, fittingly enough, a picture formed from half of Justin and half of Candace (titled "Justice" as a play on both their names). The extra lesson for the husband and wife is in a task meant for one—one must hold a tiny nail or a screw while the other must drive it into place.

=== The Entertainment Unit ===
In this challenge, the contestants must build a shelf that will house a set of speakers, their electrical panel, as well as the two batteries that will be storing the power to their sheds. To protect the batteries from dust, doors must be installed where they are housed. The contestants also have access to a chop saw (although a crew member will do the cutting on the chop saw). Meanwhile, the floor is to be cleaned in preparation for installing the floor later.

- Terry – Terry, as it reveals, has experience in making furniture, but his sides are taller than his top and his shelf has no doors for the battery protection. He is the first to finish at 31:16, though. Because of this, Angie insists on starting the cork flooring early—a decision that proves to be costly, as Angie does not allow the contact cement used in adhering the tiles to dry before placing the tiles.
- Jaime – Jaime's original design, with two overhanging shelves, was far too ambitious of a plan for the time allotted. This, in addition to the fact that Sheilla had started on the cork floor and had to be repeatedly stopped (by both Jaime and Andrew), led Jaime to not finish.
- Jeff – Jeff's main mistake is in the use of his hinges: originally, he wanted his hinges to be mounted on the bottom, so that his door would "flop open." Although Fred convinces him to put his hinges on the top, he puts his hinges on backwards, meaning that his door would not close all the way. There is also suspicion that his shelf cannot house his electrical panel, as it has yet to be re-mounted on the wall, having it dismounted during the drywall installation. Still, his shelf is done after 41:26.
- Candace – Although Candace designed the unit, it was Justin who built virtually every aspect of it, leaving Candace out of the construction. The only thing Candace got to do was unpack the speakers.
- Ruth – Ruth mounted her brackets for her shelving unit backwards (with the bracket on top rather than underneath) and decides to brace the back of her cabinet (meaning that the cabinet was no longer flush with the wall. Furthermore, her hinge installation was on in an awkward manner, with half the hinge on the inside and the other half on the outside, meaning that opening and shutting the door (which would not close all the way) would amount to an attempt at ripping the hinge apart.

=== The Rematch ===
In the original "countersink challenge" from Episode 2, Ruth had beaten Jeff in sinking a nail the fastest by the slightest of margins, the only thing Ruth succeeded at in that episode. During the previous challenge, as Ruth was waiting on Jeff to finish using the chop saw, Jeff challenges her to a rematch. In this rematch (with Andrew, the experts, the nominators, the crew and their fellow contestants all watching—Justin even holding up a makeshift sign cheering Ruth on, with Candace, Jaime, Terry and Jill taking up the other front-row seats), the premise is the same, except that Jeff and Ruth will take turns hammering in their single nail to avoid the need for video replay. The rematch begins clearly in Ruth's favor as Jeff wastes turns lightly tapping his hammer (in preparing for a real forceful hit) while his forceful hits often bent the nail (forcing him to reset) or missed the nail completely. Ruth's slow-and-steady approach wins the match after 13 strokes.

=== The Television ===
The next creature comfort to be installed is a 26-inch (660 mm) wall-mounted high-definition television. The contestants must determine where to mount the television, as well as mount and power the unit.

- Terry – Terry quickly gets his mounting bracket up, but he installs the mount to his television sideways. As a result, the screw connecting the TV to the wall-mount is not tightened properly.
- Jaime – Jaime had entirely tuned out to Sheilla's input in this and the previous challenge, which eventually caused Sheilla to break down. Although Jaime and Andrew both try to help her, Sheilla leaves the workspace in disgust. Despite this, Jaime mounts his TV on an empty part of the wall next to his urinal, but has trouble tightening the screw connecting the TV to his mounting bracket.
- Jeff – No footage is shown of Jeff's installation, although his end result was similar to that of Jaime, Candace and Terry.
- Candace – Candace proceeds slowly through this challenge, and eventually gets the TV mounted (with Justin's help in mounting the TV, but not in assembling the mount itself) above her speaker box (which is itself on the same wall as her toilet). However, the screw connecting the TV to the wall-mount is not tightened properly.
- Ruth – Ruth's main trouble (as was the case for nearly everyone) was having trouble in finding a stud. In drilling holes in the drywall (in the wall opposite where her toilet used to be), she drills two oversized holes using a screwdriver bit, then tries to drill a hole for a wall plug with a drill bit too small for the plug to fit. Attempting to ream a larger hole using the same bit on her fourth try also fails. In the end, although she has her wall-mount in place, her TV is not mounted at all.

=== The Cork Floor ===
With the floors clean and Terry's and Jaime's false starts removed, the contestants can now apply their cork tiles (costing $5 apiece) onto their floors with contact cement in earnest.

- Terry – After making the decision to rip up 40 tiles placed by Angie in the first challenge, Terry proceeds to make the same mistake as Angie by placing the tiles before the contact cement is dry (and this is only revealed to him by Sheilla). Although the later tiles are good (by virtue of having dried while the earlier tiles were applied), the earlier tiles cost Terry a passing grade.
- Jaime – It had appeared that the rift between Jaime and Sheilla had healed somewhat: although Sheilla points out that Jaime miscalculated on the number of tiles he needs and Jaime notes the fact that in a larger space they should be working from the center of the space to the edges, Jaime and Sheilla complete the challenge in relative silence. However, this different approach pays off, as the work done (in 1:39) is correct. Sheilla notes, though, that the fun had been taken out of the equation.
- Jeff – Jeff begins tiling from the middle of the floor and working towards the sides of the shed (which is correct for a larger space, but not for smaller spaces such as the shed, where the tiles should be laid starting at the door and proceeding inwards). His end results create minor imperfections in his tiles, which he is not satisfied with. He finishes in 1:56, but admits to failing the challenge based on the imperfections.
- Candace – Candace and Justin begin by making a chalk line grid pattern all over their floor, in the hope that the tiles will fit the grid pattern. It is a bad idea, as their tiles begin to diverge from the grid, creating visible gaps.
- Ruth – Little footage of consequence happens in Ruth's shed, except that her tiles were not mounted in a straight line, curving outwards slightly. She also hammers her edge tiles in place (rather than using a rolling pin) as a result of the mismeasurement.

=== Trimwork ===
The contestants must install a nailing edge around their windows and doors in order to install trim and baseboards. Again, all contestants have access to a chop saw, although Jeff and Terry are the only ones seen using it (with everyone else cutting using their mitre box and their crosscut saw—none of the contestants have a proper miter saw).

- Terry – Terry makes a slight mistake in measuring his door trim, but is able to salvage the piece for the window. However, he makes the wrong cut, forcing him to install his trim on upside-down.
- Jaime – Jaime tries to use multiple pieces of pine per side for his nailing edge (when it is recommended to have only one piece per side). When informed of this (and the fact that the trimwork will look cleaner if one piece is used) by Andrew, Jaime fixes the issue.
- Jeff – No footage of Jeff's work is shown apart from Jeff using the services of a chop saw.
- Candace – Again, Justin takes charge of this challenge, going so far as to distrust Candace's accurate measurements and remeasuring them on his own. However, he does leave one piece of trim for Candace to install herself, which (due to inexperience) results in disaster when it takes her eight nails to secure the trim in place.
- Ruth – After taking a break after splitting the trim on numerous occasions (although much of the trimwork is done), Ruth decides to install her window (which had not been installed earlier due to its large hole). Fred graciously assists in helping Ruth install the window, which is finally in—six days after the window challenge. Her trimwork is incomplete, but that is explainable as the window is not sealed by the end of the challenge.

=== Group Challenge: Finishing the Sheds ===
In the group challenge, Terry must lead the other nine persons into finishing as much of the incomplete work across all sheds as possible within 90 minutes. Although simple on paper, Terry identifies 47 unfinished tasks (including the reinstallation of features that were removed for the flooring) in total between the sheds (with 10 tasks in his, Jeff's and Jamie's sheds, 13 in Ruth's and only four in Candace's). The nine other persons, for their part, are offended when Terry takes this opportunity to get everyone working on his own shed (Candace, as a reaction to Terry making everyone work on his shed: "You lazy SOB!"), much to everyone's objections—to the point where when Terry hands his orders out to Angie, Sheilla promptly takes it from her hands and rips it up in protest (Sheilla, on having everyone working on Terry's shed: "You know, this isn't fair. We should be doing everyone's shed but yours."). Terry eventually allows Jaime to work on his own shed and also assigns Fred and Justin to take care of the ceilings (Fred in Ruth's shed and Justin in Jaime's), although Terry is also rebuked when he wants Fred to install a urinal in Ruth's shed (Fred objects, of course, because Ruth would have no use for a urinal, saying simply, "Ladies don't like using urinals"). Terry is even forced from barking orders in Ruth's shed—not because of his apparent lack of leadership ability, but because he was smoking in Ruth's self-declared no-smoking zone. Terry's lack of organization leads to his downfall: first, he tries to reassign people on the spot as a task is nearing completion, first by pulling Justin so that he could assist Fred (although both roofs would eventually be completed) and replacing him with Angie (in Terry' shed at the time), then by kicking Ruth out of her own shed (and into Terry's, where Jeff is also working) and forcing Michelle and Candace (both working in Ruth's shed, sealing the window) to meet Justin in Jaime's shed—only for none of them to show up. In the end, only seven of the tasks that Terry identifies is complete: the ceilings on Terry's, Ruth's and Jaime's sheds, the sealing of Ruth's window, the installation of Ruth's electrical panel and the trimwork in Jaime's shed.

In the final evaluation, the focus on Jaime's imperfect trimwork was on the mind of the experts, when Andrew raised the issue of whether Jaime's interaction with Sheilla should even be considered to be the main critique. Although the experts validate Andrew, they also state that the perfectly finished floor vindicates him somewhat. The work on Terry's shed is criticized as being wasteful (having destroyed 40 cork tiles in his false start and not waiting until the contact cement was dry before adhering tiles causing more and also having six persons working on his shed in the group challenge with little to show for it), while the main criticisms in Jeff's shed is his visible gap between his cork tiles and his battery door not closing all the way (due to, as Greg puts it, hinge-bound hinges). Ruth's shed is critiqued for its overall incompleteness (including her hinge-bound hinges), while Candace's shed is critiqued over the fact that to this point, Justin had been doing much of the work, leaving the contestant to do virtually nothing except yell at her nominator when he is either doing too little or too much of the work.

== Episode 7: Hanging by a Thread ==
Original Airdate: May 28, 2007

In this episode, the contestants install roofs on their sheds and Jaime and Sheilla are considered to be the co-foremen in the two-part group challenge. Being the penultimate episode, no one is named the most improved, but Jaime is named the worst for his disastrous leadership work (despite his shed being arguably the best overall) which rendered every roof to be done incorrectly. His remedial work is to identify the faults in the roofs that he had caused as the foreman. With Jaime being named the worst, this marks the first time that all of the contestants have been named the worst at one point or another.

=== Group Challenge: Sheeting ===
In the first of the two-part group challenge, Jaime and Sheilla, as co-foremen, must lead the other eight cast members in insulating, sheeting and shingling the roofs in all five sheds. The first part of the group challenge involves the former two. Because of the height of Ruth's shed (at 10'10"), all the contestants and nominators are trained in a course on fall safety prior to the challenge, as Ontario's regulations require this for working on the roof of any structure over 10-foot (3.0 m) in height. Despite the fact that Candace is barred from being on a roof due to her pregnancy, she, too, must also take the training. In addition, due to Jeff's flat roof, his shed requires thicker plywood, and enough plywood is provided to cover Jeff's exactly and 10% more than what is needed is provided for the other four sheds. Jaime and Sheilla quickly organize the eight others so that two two-man crews (Terry and Fred on one team, while Justin and Jeff are on the other) are on the roofs on two sheds (although Jaime had initially wanted three-man crews), while Ruth and Angie relay measurements for Candace and Michelle to cut. However, things go out of control when Sheilla insists on cutting down the plywood sheets instead of relying on full sheets, meaning that by the time the first two sheds (Jaime's-- done by Justin and Jeff—and Terry's, done by Terry and Fred) are sheeted, there are no full sheets remaining. In fact, by the time the last shed (Candace's, done by Justin and Jeff) is left to be done, only cut pieces of all shapes and sizes remain. However, Jaime and Sheilla do get the roofs to be sheeted in two and a half hours.

=== Group Challenge: Shingling ===
The second of the two-part group challenge involves installing tar paper over the sheeting and then installing shingles on each roof (except for Jeff's, whose flat roof requires galvanized steel). Regardless of the outcome of this challenge, every roof will eventually be completed—either through the contestants and their nominators in this challenge, or by the show's staff after the fact. Due to Justin being a metalworker by trade, Justin and Jeff get working on Jeff's shed, while Terry and Fred form one of the roofing teams while Angie and Sheilla form the other. In Justin's and Jeff's shed, the two make the mistake of installing the flashing first instead of last, creating a water dam. Jeff's progression in his skills is also showcased when he is shown cutting the metal with a circular saw under Justin's supervision—a far cry from his inability to use a jigsaw well during the skills evaluation. However, Jeff had cut his metal too short, resulting in a roof that will leak. Meanwhile, things go badly due to Jaime's and Sheilla's different leadership styles: while Jaime tries to be an inspirational leader, Sheilla is more of a demanding workhorse, trying to get Michelle to help out on the roof. When Michelle refuses, Sheilla does not take it well at all. Terry and Fred, on Candace's roof, made the mistake of not shingling around the rubber gasket (in fact, the rubber gasket was stapled down to the sheeting with no tar paper underneath). Meanwhile, Angie and Sheilla would begin to work on Terry's roof, while Jaime tackles Ruth's shed with Michelle, leaving Ruth to do nothing. In the end, with only 15 minutes to go in the challenge and two sheds (Terry's and Candace's) fully done, Jaime and Sheilla decide to abort and cleanup.

=== Finishing Touches ===
After finishing the group challenge, the contestants have 90 minutes to finish any unfinished tasks (which largely amounted to painting the shed in their colors). They are assisted by Greg and Jill wherever necessary, so as to give everyone completed sheds. Much of the remaining work is painting the sheds and putting a sign on their sheds. Finally, to complete their shed interiors, the contestants' workbenches, complete with tools are moved into their sheds.

=== The Shed Door ===
As their final act, the contestants install the doors to their sheds. The doors were built as part of the shed frames at the start of the series, but had been removed—even the screw holes remain after 26 challenges. The doors are brought back for four of the contestants to install. Ruth, who had, in the design of her shed, insisted that, to fit into the "eco-shed" theme, that wooden barn doors to be installed, is provided with wooden doors instead of the metal doors that were originally part of her shed.

- Terry – Terry's door installation goes without a hitch, until he tries to close the shed door. It closes, but only from the inside (due to his strike plates not matching up), locking Terry inside his own shed.
- Jaime – Jaime's door installation had minor issues (including a moment where Jaime was using a chisel with the blade towards himself). His door closes, but only with force.
- Jeff – Footage was shown of Jeff's installation was limited to the use of a chisel to create recessions for the strike plates, although the door itself was later shown to be correct in the sense that it closes correctly (but was also incorrect in the sense that it was secured with only one or two screws per hinge).
- Candace – Candace, in what is arguably the first challenge entirely without Justin taking over the job (stemming from the promise that Justin had made at the end of the previous episode to let Candace's mistakes lie instead of quickly correcting her when she is doing something wrong), struggled with using a chisel through the entire challenge and could not install her own shed door.
- Ruth – Ruth's barn doors were originally installed upside-down and backwards, and this fact was only discovered when they discovered that the shed doors would only open inwards. This is quickly fixed by Ruth and Michelle; however, the end result left an inch-wide gap between the doors.

When the sheds are complete, Jaime completes the most of the challenges at 18, while Terry and Candace finish 13 challenges correctly. Jeff finishes three of the challenges correctly, while Ruth finishes the fewest with only two. However, despite Jaime completing two-thirds of the challenges, the criticisms fall hard on Jaime over the group challenge: Terry's roof is incorrect as his shingles (done by Angie and Sheilla) were not staggered) while Candace's roof (done by Terry and Fred) was not correctly shingled around her toilet's vent stack. In Ruth's shed (whose roof was done by the show staff), the main criticism was over her work in general, as she had done the fewest of the challenges (at one point, Andrew could tear down her trim with only one hand). Jeff's main criticisms largely resulted in the choice of the flat roof, which Jill compared to a deck—its almost nonexistent slope, despite the steel roofing, meant that puddles could still easily form on the roof, compromising the shed's structure.

== Episode 8: Raising the Roof ==
Original Airdate: June 4, 2007

In this episode, the five completed sheds are moved out of the Handyman Rehabilitation Centre, where they will be loaded onto a truck, awaiting delivery to their new owners. However, only Candace's shed will be able to move out in one piece, due to the height restriction of 9-foot-2-inch (2.79 m) (despite the doorway itself being 9-foot-6-inch (2.90 m) to allow some room for error)-- the four others must be cut down to size. Because of the effort of moving the sheds (despite the fact that they are on castors under the subfloor), the show's crew as well as the experts are all there to assist.

=== Terry's Shed ===
After seeing Jaime's initial failure, Terry is worried about his shed, which is taller than Jaime's. In addition, his measurements reveal that his shed is also too wide and too long. Terry suggests that a chainsaw be taken to Terry's shed so that it can come out in four pieces (after telling everyone of having quartered a moose with a chainsaw), for which Jill is happy to oblige. The shed is cut front to back with the chainsaw, and the front half is cut again, only to find the second cut unnecessary. The rear half of the shed is taken out, but the roof is also taken off (so indeed, Terry's "Bud Shed" is in four pieces). After his shed is removed, Terry resolves to reassemble his pieces with duct tape, something Merle from the previous season would have done in rehab.

=== Jaime's Shed ===
Because of Jaime's claim that his shed is the best (justified by the fact that he finished more challenges correctly than anyone else), his shed is the first shed to be moved out... until he discovers that his roof will not fit due to the height restriction (being 8-inch (200 mm) too tall). Jaime goes back to the drawing board and tries to figure out a way to remove his shed in two pieces. After three sheds have been removed, Jaime comes up with the idea of using the overhead pulley inside the shop to lift the roof off the shed, and using it again to reassemble the shed once both pieces are outside. He first braces the underside of the roof at both ends of the shed (so that the roof will not collapse when it is lifted) and installs castors on the underside of the braces. Separating the top plate from the roof proves to be not too difficult and, after extensive harnessing, manages to successfully carry out his plan.

=== Jeff's Shed ===
After measuring his shed and the doorway after Jaime's initial failure, Jeff discovers that his shed is just over the height of the 9-foot-6-inch (2.90 m) door, making for a tight fit. His first attempt at pushing the shed at high speed fails, he discovers that his shed is only a small amount over the height of the door (in his words, less than the thickness of a screw). To address this, he removes his steel roof and after three more attempts, finally makes it through the door. His shed is the first shed to be removed from the Handyman Rehabilitation Centre.

=== Candace's Shed ===
Because her shed is fully within the building guidelines put out by the show, her shed easily rolls out of the Handyman Rehabilitation Centre with the minor caveat of detaching her vent stack and reattaching it later. Her shed is the second to be moved out, after Jeff's.

=== Ruth's Shed ===
As the tallest shed, Ruth has her work cut out, as she is 20-inch (510 mm) too tall. As part of the redesign, though, Ruth had asked for a three-foot increase in height, which was accommodated by the experts by adding a 3-foot (0.91 m)-high pony wall. Ruth, after tearing off the exterior sheeting, resolves to cut the shed where the main wall meets the pony wall and move the two pieces (each of which is easily under the height restriction) and reassemble it later. However, instead of adopting Jaime's approach (as Jaime had a similar problem and was successful at it), Ruth instead uses pipes as rollers to move the top half of the shed onto scaffolding, freeing the bottom half. However, she is stuck with what to do about getting the top half off the scaffolding. Resolving to weaken the scaffolding so that the top half easily drops onto the floor, the top of Ruth's shed collapses instead, crushing the pony wall and flattening her peaked roof. Ruth's shed is the last shed to make it out of the Handyman Rehabilitation Centre, but is now in three (incomplete) pieces (the bottom half of her shed and the two halves of what was her roof).

=== The Verdict ===
In the final evaluation by the experts, Jeff's shed is the first to be evaluated. Although the poor workmanship is clearly shown (Jeff claiming that he had finished the fewest challenges correctly—which is not actually true as Ruth finished fewer), he is vindicated as his learning experience was well worth the trip (to support this, his troubles with the jigsaw in the Skills Evaluation and his use of a circular saw to cut metal for his roof are contrasted, as is his lack of knowledge of a drywall file during the tool test and his usage of one during drywalling). Despite Jaime's claims, the experts actually consider Candace's shed to be the best, as it has a solid overall quality of workmanship and was the only one of the five to fully meet all the requirements. While there were questions over exactly how much of the work was really done by Justin, Candace did learn that doing things is not as simple as it appears on television and she too is deemed not the worst by the experts (consideration was also given to her pregnancy, which made it impossible for her to safely carry out several of the challenges). Jaime's shed is also deemed not the worst, though the experts were still rather scornful that he had to resort to such lengths to get it out of the warehouse. The main critique they had for Jaime was lack of planning skills and his relationship with Sheilla, both of which were addressed over the course of the series (Sheilla, in fact, was entirely supportive of Jaime's plan in this episode, which was a shock, considering Sheilla usually criticized Jaime). In fact, when informally polled by the contestants and nominators on who may be Canada's Worst Handyman, Jaime's name had never come up, not even by Sheilla (again, a shock, considering it was because of Sheilla constantly criticizing Jaime when she should have been criticizing Kendra for not accompanying Jaime to rehab, since Candace was able to attend rehab while pregnant; Candace and Jeff having named themselves—Jeff from his self-admitted skill level and Candace due to Justin having done most of the work—and Ruth and Terry having named each other). In a sense, these three had addressed the main issues that had led them to their nominations. This left the two contestants with their sheds in pieces: Terry and Ruth. Although Greg and Jill vehemently differed on who is worse (Greg claiming that Ruth is the worst because she was slow, prone to giving up and had the least amount of work done, while Jill puts Terry as the worst due to his lack of commitment to the instructions, including having his shed exceed the show's limits in all three dimensions and also due to the quality of his work having dropped considerably after Harvey left), eventually they agree: over the course of the series, one took pride in their work but failed to deliver, while the other did not. The final factor was clearly visible: while Ruth was visibly disappointed in the fact that her shed had to be cut up, Terry revelled and fully enjoyed what amounted to tearing his shed down. Because of this, despite the fact that he finished more challenges than Ruth and was the only contestant to be named most improved twice, Terry is named Canada's Worst Handyman.

=== Can-Cam Confessions ===
In the bonus segment, the Can-Cam has everyone give their insights on the final day at the Handyman Rehabilitation Centre, as well as each contestant or nominator's picks to be Canada's Worst Handyman.

- Michelle insisted that Ruth's plan was unsound and that she fully deserved the title, not Terry. Justin also picks Ruth to be Canada's Worst Handyman, while Jeff contends that it is a two-way battle between his admittedly poor skills versus Terry's end results that would determine who was Canada's Worst Handyman.
- Jaime contends that Terry quartering his shed may have been his undoing (believing that he should have had a more sound plan to take his shed apart). Terry admitting privately that his shed is unsalvageable after having quartered it.
- Terry and Ruth each putting down the other's shed, while complimenting their own.
- Candace and Jeff, during the lunch break (as Ruth's shed lie separated and Jaime's yet to be removed), believing that the experts may swerve and name either one of them as Canada's Worst Handyman, despite Andrew's reassurances to the contrary (as Canada's Worst Handyman would be decided on the "final look" of the shed and both had gotten their sheds out in one piece) and Justin's convictions.
- Jeff, on his laptop, calls Harvey back home to tell him that Terry was named Canada's Worst Handyman. Harvey's surprised at the fact that Jeff didn't win and his reaction to Terry having quartered his shed was particularly notable: "You dummy, what did you do?!"
- Sheilla defends her attitude towards Jaime throughout the series and admits that both parties had learned from this ordeal.
- Angie's reactions to being "Mrs. Canada's Worst Handyman" is explored briefly.
- Michelle laments her inability to assist in the later part of the day due to a gallbladder attack.
- Candace remarks on her pregnancy, hoping that she would not give multiple birth.
- Jaime, Jeff and Terry reflect on what they had learned: Jeff in the importance of instructions, Jaime in his relationship with Sheilla (though he admits that he'd be better off not working with her) and Terry in "doing it the right way and not a shortcut way." Terry also claims that he would tear his man-shed back home down and build it over again.
- Michelle claims that Ruth did not learn from the two-week stay at the Handyman Rehabilitation Centre... except being a further danger to herself from doing electrical. She concludes by saying that she would never look at a shed in the same way again.

== Episode 9: Special Delivery ==
Original Airdate: June 11, 2007

In the recap episode, the six sheds (the five belonging to the contestants, plus one built by the experts) are delivered to the persons who had bought them sight unseen on eBay. As Canada's Worst Handyman, Terry will be present to personally present his shed to the ones who had purchased his. The six eco-sheds, one each from the contestants and one built by the experts, combined raised over $10,000 for Habitat for Humanity Canada. As it is an hour-long drive from the Handyman Rehabilitation Centre to the shed's new owners, the Lange family in Caledon, Ontario, Terry and Andrew reminisce on their time at the Handyman Rehabilitation Centre on the way there. Terry and Andrew first reminisce about Jeff, the computer expert Terry was convinced he could beat. Jeff finally learned the importance of instructions through his adventures and was ultimately considered rehabilitated. In the end, his shed arrives to the Boettcher family, who had bought the shed as a Father's Day gift. Terry and Andrew then reminisce about Ruth, the retired teacher/psychologist Terry was convinced was the worst. The birdhouse column (built during the Skills Evaluation) collapsing during the window challenge may have been an ominous sign of things to come, as her oversized shed may have been a cause of why she had only completed one challenge unassisted and why she was named the worst on the second episode and was on the experts' shortlist in nearly every subsequent one. Because of this, Ruth was declared to have not been rehabilitated. Ruth's shed arrives in Newcastle, Ontario to the Noble family, who had paid $1,725 for her three-piece remains. Terry and Andrew then reminisce about Jaime, the web designer whose constant battling with Sheilla was a source of contention for Jaime and nearly everyone else as well. Still, the spat during the TV installing challenge that caused Sheilla to finally go over the edge, but it gave them the opportunity to improve their relationship, cooperating to salvage their oversized shed using a plan that not even the experts and crew believed would succeed, thus rehabilitating him. Jaime's shed arrives in Caledon to the Eturi family, who were glad that the shed was of a passable quality... and even more so that Sheilla didn't come with it. Terry and Andrew finally reminisce about Candace, the nurse's assistant whose self-proclaimed prowess was contrasted with Justin's actual expertise and it was Justin who helped Candace go through entire challenges correctly, almost to the point of excluding Candace entirely. Candace's sometimes wild mood swings were often something that would lead Justin to take charge and complete challenges by himself and it was only halfway through rehab (namely the Grouting Challenge) that the show crew (and the other contestants, for that matter) learned that this was because Candace was three months pregnant with their second child (Candace has since given birth to a boy). Terry admits that Candace having Justin may have given her an advantage in the rehab process, as he helped her bail her out of her troubles. However, after becoming the worst in the second-to-last episode (leading Justin to give a more hands-off approach due to it being a factor), Candace finally learns that construction is not as easy in real-life as it is on TV, thus rehabilitating her. Candace's shed arrives at the home of common-law partners Debra Hale and Dale Roach, who paid $1,825 for the shed, and are completely satisfied with what they had paid for, being well worth their investment. As for the Lange family, who paid $1,676 for Canada's Worst Shed, Canada's Worst Handyman arrives at their home. The Lange family had hoped to put the shed near their pool to rival their neighbour's gazebo, but clearly, that was not going to happen. Terry's shed arrives in two packages: one driven by Terry and Andrew and the second by Harvey (arriving with Angie), who had last seen the shed when it was still in one piece. As the pieces are being unloaded, Harvey delivers a final poem, A Shed in Torment, to close off the series. The episode ends with Terry stating that he wants to build a gazebo. Throughout the episode, Andrew also explains the various costs of these eco-sheds: these sheds cost over $2,809.40 for the structure alone, due to the various expensive materials involved (compared to roughly $1,318 using conventional materials) and how their eco-friendly materials compare to their regular counterparts. Among the highlights of this cost comparison:

- Eco-friendly lumber approved by the Forest Stewardship Council of Canada for the frame (largely recycled lumber) cost $417 compared to $200 for regular lumber. FSC-approved plywood (differing only from regular plywood through the use of sustainable tree-harvesting practices) cost $1,040 compared to $480 for regular plywood.
- The cotton insulation used in the eco-sheds cost $730 per shed, compared to $176 for fibreglass insulation.
- The eco-drywall, made from 96% recycled materials, costs the same as regular drywall-- $132 per shed. Furthermore, it can also double as fertilizer and does not release hydrogen sulfide as it breaks down.
- The eco-friendly paint, free of all volatile organic compounds such as formaldehyde, cost three times as much as regular paint.
