= Skirret (tool) =

Archaic device used in construction

A skirret is an archaic form of chalk line. It is a wooden tool shaped like the letter "T", historically used to ensure the foundation of a building was straight by laying down string as a marker. Today it is obsolete and little known, save for its use in some Freemasonry ceremonies.
