= Pony wall =

Short wall that is not full height

A pony wall is a short wall. Typically they are between 3 feet (0.91 m) and 4 feet (1.2 m) in height. They can be used for structural purposes or as a room divider.

In different circumstances, it may refer to:

- a half wall that only extends partway from floor to ceiling, without supporting anything.
- a stem wall, a concrete wall that extends from the foundation slab to the cripple wall or floor joists.
- a cripple wall, a framed wall that extends from the stem wall or foundation slab to the floor joists.
- a knee wall, which extends from the floor to a countertop, rafter, or handrail.
