= Chalk line =

Tool for marking straight lines

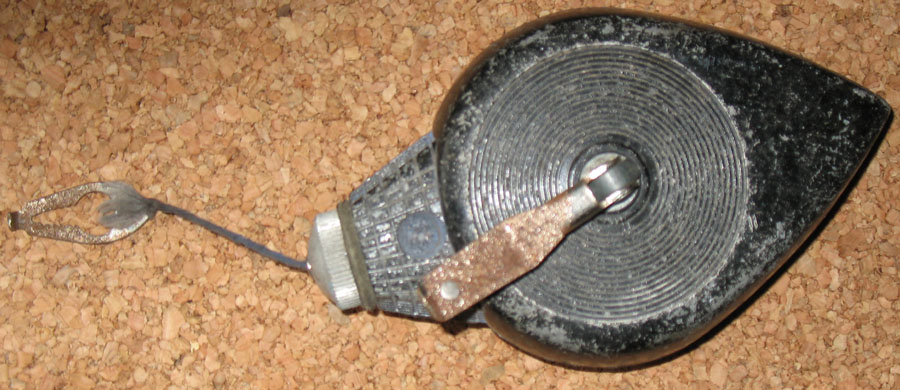
Chalk line tool

A chalk line or chalk box is a tool for marking long, straight lines on relatively flat surfaces, much further than is practical by hand or with a straightedge. They may be used to lay out straight lines between two points, or vertical lines by using the weight of the line reel as a plumb line.

It is an important tool in carpentry, and the working of timber in a rough and unplaned state, as it does not require the timber to have a straight or squared edge formed onto it beforehand.

== Use ==
A chalk line creates straight lines by the action of a taut string that has been previously coated with a loose, powdered dye, usually chalk. The string is then laid across the surface to be marked and pulled tight. Next, the string is plucked or snapped sharply, causing it to strike the surface, which then transfers its chalk to the surface along the straight line where it struck.

Chalk lines are typically used to mark relatively flat surfaces. However, as long as the line is taut and the two ends of the chalk line are almost in the same plane, the chalk line will mark all points the string touches on or near that plane once snapped. The objects to be marked do not need to be continuous along the line. Chalk lines can also be used across irregular surfaces and holey surfaces, for example on an unfinished stud wall.

The primary problems associated with improper maintenance of a chalk line are string breakage due to excessive tension on the line, and degradation of the line associated with moisture contamination.

Chalk lines and plumb-bobs are often sold as a single tool.

== History ==
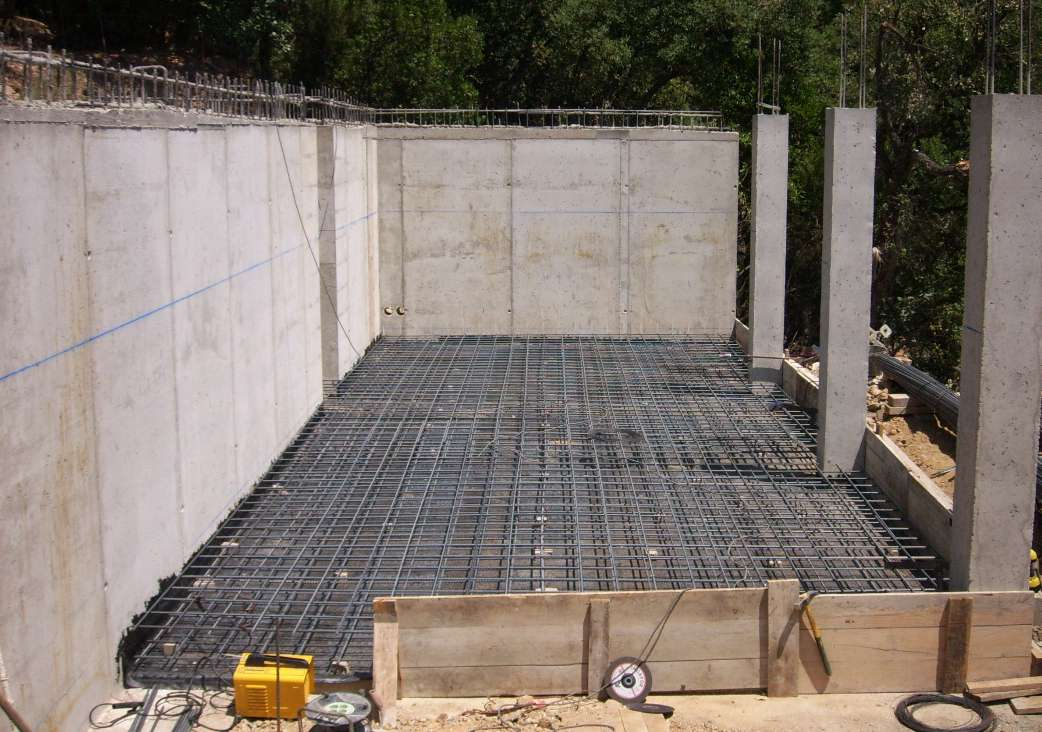
Blue chalk line on concrete walls as level reference

Chalk lines were used in ancient Egypt, are mentioned in Homer's Illiad, and have been used continuously by builders in various cultures since.

Continuing development of this simple-but-effective tool focuses on the coloration for the chalk or marking compound, as well as the outer case and method of handling.

== Ink lines ==
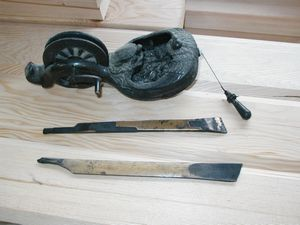
Sumitsubo and bamboo marking pens

In East Asia, an ink line is used in preference to a chalk line. This is a silken cord, stored on a combined reel and inkpot which was invented by Chinese master craftsman Lu Ban.

In Japan, it is called a sumitsubo. Alongside the line reel is a cavity filled with ink-soaked cotton fibres, which the line is drawn through as it is unreeled. These sumitsubo are highly decorated and much-prized by their owners. As with many such tools, they are often made by their users while apprentices.

Upon the completion of a major building, a large celebration or topping-out ceremony is held. As part of this event, a set of symbolic carpenter's tools are freshly made and presented to the new building. A sumitsubo is a traditional tool included with them.

== See also ==
- Measuring tape
- Skirret (tool)
