= Lists of radio series episodes =

This is a list of lists of radio series episodes.

== CBS Radio Mystery Theater ==
- List of CBS Radio Mystery Theater episodes (1974 season)
- List of CBS Radio Mystery Theater episodes (1975 season)
- List of CBS Radio Mystery Theater episodes (1976 season)
- List of CBS Radio Mystery Theater episodes (1977 season)
- List of CBS Radio Mystery Theater episodes (1978 season)
- List of CBS Radio Mystery Theater episodes (1979 season)
- List of CBS Radio Mystery Theater episodes (1980 season)
- List of CBS Radio Mystery Theater episodes (1981 season)
- List of CBS Radio Mystery Theater episodes (1982 season)

== Desert Island Discs ==
- List of Desert Island Discs episodes
- List of Desert Island Discs episodes (1942–1946)
- List of Desert Island Discs episodes (1951–1960)
- List of Desert Island Discs episodes (1961–1970)
- List of Desert Island Discs episodes (1971–1980)
- List of Desert Island Discs episodes (1981–1990)
- List of Desert Island Discs episodes (1991–2000)
- List of Desert Island Discs episodes (2001–2010)
- List of Desert Island Discs episodes (2011–2020)
- List of Desert Island Discs episodes (2021–present)

== Private Passions ==
- List of Private Passions episodes (1995–1999)
- List of Private Passions episodes (2000–2004)
- List of Private Passions episodes (2005–2009)
- List of Private Passions episodes (2010–2014)
- List of Private Passions episodes (2015–2019)
- List of Private Passions episodes (2020–present)

== Stuff You Should Know ==
- List of Stuff You Should Know episodes
- List of Stuff You Should Know episodes (2008)
- List of Stuff You Should Know episodes (2009)
- List of Stuff You Should Know episodes (2010)
- List of Stuff You Should Know episodes (2011)
- List of Stuff You Should Know episodes (2012)
- List of Stuff You Should Know episodes (2013)
- List of Stuff You Should Know episodes (2014)
- List of Stuff You Should Know episodes (2015)
- List of Stuff You Should Know episodes (2016)
- List of Stuff You Should Know episodes (2017)
- List of Stuff You Should Know episodes (2018)
- List of Stuff You Should Know episodes (2019)
- List of Stuff You Should Know episodes (2020)
- List of Stuff You Should Know episodes (2021)

== This American Life ==
- Lists of This American Life episodes
- List of 1995 This American Life episodes
- List of 1996 This American Life episodes
- List of 1997 This American Life episodes
- List of 1998 This American Life episodes
- List of 1999 This American Life episodes
- List of 2000 This American Life episodes
- List of 2001 This American Life episodes
- List of 2002 This American Life episodes
- List of 2003 This American Life episodes
- List of 2004 This American Life episodes
- List of 2005 This American Life episodes
- List of 2006 This American Life episodes
- List of 2007 This American Life episodes
- List of 2008 This American Life episodes
- List of 2009 This American Life episodes
- List of 2010 This American Life episodes
- List of 2011 This American Life episodes
- List of 2012 This American Life episodes
- List of 2013 This American Life episodes
- List of 2014 This American Life episodes
- List of 2015 This American Life episodes
- List of 2016 This American Life episodes
- List of 2017 This American Life episodes
- List of 2018 This American Life episodes
- List of 2019 This American Life episodes
- List of 2020 This American Life episodes

== Wait Wait... Don't Tell Me! ==
- List of Wait Wait... Don't Tell Me! episodes
- List of Wait Wait... Don't Tell Me! episodes (1998)
- List of Wait Wait... Don't Tell Me! episodes (1999)
- List of Wait Wait... Don't Tell Me! episodes (2000)
- List of Wait Wait... Don't Tell Me! episodes (2001)
- List of Wait Wait... Don't Tell Me! episodes (2002)
- List of Wait Wait... Don't Tell Me! episodes (2003)
- List of Wait Wait... Don't Tell Me! episodes (2004)
- List of Wait Wait... Don't Tell Me! episodes (2005)
- List of Wait Wait... Don't Tell Me! episodes (2006)
- List of Wait Wait... Don't Tell Me! episodes (2007)
- List of Wait Wait... Don't Tell Me! episodes (2008)
- List of Wait Wait... Don't Tell Me! episodes (2009)
- List of Wait Wait... Don't Tell Me! episodes (2010)
- List of Wait Wait... Don't Tell Me! episodes (2011)
- List of Wait Wait... Don't Tell Me! episodes (2012)
- List of Wait Wait... Don't Tell Me! episodes (2013)
- List of Wait Wait... Don't Tell Me! episodes (2014)
- List of Wait Wait... Don't Tell Me! episodes (2015)
- List of Wait Wait... Don't Tell Me! episodes (2016)
- List of Wait Wait... Don't Tell Me! episodes (2017)
- List of Wait Wait... Don't Tell Me! episodes (2018)
- List of Wait Wait... Don't Tell Me! episodes (2019)
- List of Wait Wait... Don't Tell Me! episodes (2020)
- List of Wait Wait... Don't Tell Me! episodes (2021)
- List of Wait Wait... Don't Tell Me! episodes (2022)
- List of Wait Wait... Don't Tell Me! episodes (2023)
- List of Wait Wait... Don't Tell Me! episodes (2024)
- List of Wait Wait... Don't Tell Me! episodes (2025)
- List of Wait Wait... Don't Tell Me! episodes (2026)

== Other ==
- List of 2000 Plus episodes
- List of Adventures in Odyssey episodes
- List of The Champs episodes
- List of Dad's Army radio episodes
- List of Dead Ringers episodes
- List of Dimension X episodes
- List of Doc Savage radio episodes
- List of Dragnet (radio series) episodes
- List of Exploring Tomorrow episodes
- List of Flywheel, Shyster, and Flywheel episodes
- List of Gunsmoke (radio series) episodes
- List of Inner Sanctum episodes
- List of In Our Time programmes
- List of Jungle Jam and Friends: The Radio Show! episodes
- List of Lights Out episodes
- List of Mann Ki Baat episodes
- List of Nebulous episodes
- List of Old Harry's Game episodes
- List of Planet B episodes
- List of Radiolab episodes
- List of The Goon Show episodes
- List of The Men from the Ministry episodes
- List of The Navy Lark episodes
- List of The Shadow episodes
- List of WireTap episodes
- List of X Minus One episodes
- List of Yours Truly, Johnny Dollar episodes
