= List of This American Life radio episodes =

The following is a list of the yearly lists of This American Life radio episodes. This American Life is a weekly hour-long public radio program produced by Chicago Public Radio and hosted by Ira Glass. It began as a radio program in 1995.

- List of 1995 This American Life episodes (#1–7)
- List of 1996 This American Life episodes (#8–47)
- List of 1997 This American Life episodes (#48–87)
- List of 1998 This American Life episodes (#88–118)
- List of 1999 This American Life episodes (#119–148)
- List of 2000 This American Life episodes (#149–174)
- List of 2001 This American Life episodes (#175–202)
- List of 2002 This American Life episodes (#203–227)
- List of 2003 This American Life episodes (#228–255)
- List of 2004 This American Life episodes (#256–279)
- List of 2005 This American Life episodes (#280–305)
- List of 2006 This American Life episodes (#306–322)
- List of 2007 This American Life episodes (#323–346)
- List of 2008 This American Life episodes (#347–371)
- List of 2009 This American Life episodes (#372–396)
- List of 2010 This American Life episodes (#397–422)
- List of 2011 This American Life episodes (#423–453)
- List of 2012 This American Life episodes (#454–482)
- List of 2013 This American Life episodes (#483–514)
- List of 2014 This American Life episodes (#515–543)
- List of 2015 This American Life episodes (#544–576)
- List of 2016 This American Life episodes (#577–606)
- List of 2017 This American Life episodes (#607–634)
- List of 2018 This American Life episodes (#635–664)
- List of 2019 This American Life episodes (#665–690)
- List of 2020 This American Life episodes (#691–728)
- List of 2021 This American Life episodes (#728–756)
- List of 2022 This American Life episodes (#757–786)
- List of 2023 This American Life episodes (#787–819)
- List of 2024 This American Life episodes (#820–847)
Number of episodes produced (by year)
