= 21 Chump Street =

Musical

- The Musical
- Cover of the Original Cast Recording
- Music: Lin-Manuel Miranda
- Lyrics: Lin-Manuel Miranda
- Book: Lin-Manuel Miranda
- Basis: What I Did For Love by Robbie Brown
- Productions: 2014 Brooklyn; 2016 London; 2017 Melbourne; 2023 Sydney

21 Chump Street is a fourteen-minute one-act musical with book, music and lyrics by Lin-Manuel Miranda. The show was based on the second act of episode #457 of This American Life, titled "What I Did For Love" and reported by Robbie Brown, in which a high school student, Justin Laboy, falls in love with an undercover police officer, and is ultimately arrested for selling drugs to the officer in an attempt to impress her. The title is a satirical reference to the 1987 TV show 21 Jump Street which was about undercover narcotics agents in a high school. The musical premiered in a showcase put on by This American Life, held at the Brooklyn Academy of Music on June 7, 2014, and broadcast as episode #528, "The Radio Drama Episode".

== Synopsis ==
The show opens with the narrator telling the audience about a plan called Operation D-Minus. He introduces Justin Laboy, an eighteen-year-old senior honors student attending Park Vista Community High School in Lake Worth, Florida. Justin meets a new student, Naomi Rodriguez, and instantly gets an overwhelming crush on her.

Naomi does not answer Justin's repeated requests about what he needs to do to make her fall in love with him, and Justin asks Naomi to go to prom. Though other students say that Naomi rejected him, Justin insists that she tells him that she'll think about it, and he is overjoyed ("What the Heck I Gotta Do"). Naomi confirms to the Narrator that she was indeed asked to prom but denies ever telling him she would think about it. The Narrator then reveals that Naomi is a twenty-five-year-old undercover cop trying to learn which students are dealing drugs.

When Naomi asks Justin if he smokes marijuana, he tells her he doesn't but if that's what she needs then he'll find some for her, and Naomi responds with appreciation. He then divulges to the Narrator that he has no idea what he's doing, but he just cares too much about Naomi to have told her no ("One School").

Justin calls a cousin, who in turn calls up a seemingly endless cycle of others to get the marijuana. Three cousins argue if they should help Justin and are surprised that he would even ask such a thing due to his being a successful student. Meanwhile, Justin is asked by Naomi about the marijuana. Eventually, Justin gets the drugs by telling them that he's in love. One of them hands Justin a bag of marijuana, and he goes off to find Naomi ("Cousin").

Naomi asks Justin to meet at school the next day. Justin refuses Naomi's money, though, insisting that the marijuana is a gift to prove just how much he cares about her. Knowing that she can't properly bust him without the monetary transaction, she shoves it into Justin's hands just as a teacher comes into the room which prevents him from returning the money. Then, Justin kisses her ("The Money").

Because Justin is over eighteen and sold drugs on school grounds, the Narrator explains Justin had made an "irreversibly bad decision." Naomi reiterates that she's doing the right thing though she seems upset about what she did because Justin seemed like a good kid. She explains that there are smart and defenseless kids that she thinks about after the job is over, obviously talking about Justin.

In May, the police arrest Justin and other students. Justin realizes that he'll lose in court, and pleads guilty. Justin receives three years' probation and has to spend a week in jail while the other students point out that he'll never get into college now.

Later, Naomi sits with the Narrator and discusses the effects drugs have had on her family while growing up. She states that she's doing the right thing, and wishes that someone had done her job when she was in school. However, she admits that she's never going to forget Justin, and that he touched her heart.

During his time in jail, Justin can't stop thinking about Naomi. The Narrator asks Justin what he would say to Naomi if she were in the room with them. Justin responds, echoing his earlier sentiments: "What the heck did you do?" ("Epilogue").

== Musical numbers ==
The show is performed in one act, and is about fourteen minutes in length. The characters of the students, cousins, and cops are played by three ensemble members.

- "What the Heck I Gotta Do" – Justin, Narrator, Naomi, Tevin, Derek, and Andrew
- "One School" – Naomi, Narrator, Justin
- "Cousin" – Cousin 1, Cousin 2, Justin, Narrator, and Naomi
- "The Money" – Naomi, Justin, Narrator, Tevin, Derek, and Andrew
- "Epilogue" – Narrator, Naomi, Justin, Cop, Lawyer, and Boy

== Original casts ==
Character	2014 Premiere
Narrator	Lin-Manuel Miranda
Justin Laboy	Anthony Ramos
Naomi Rodriguez	Lindsay Mendez
Tevin, Cousin 1, and Boy	Alex Boniello
Derek, Cousin 2, and Lawyer	Gerard Canonico
Andrew, Cousin 3, and Police Officer	Antwaun Holley
