= List of Stuff You Should Know episodes (2021) =

This is a list of episodes from 2021 for the Stuff You Should Know podcast.

== 2021 season ==
No. in series	No. in season	Title	Length	Original air date
1335	1	"Space Weather - What's That?!"	54 minutes	January 5, 2021
1336	2	"The Wright Brothers"	69 minutes	January 7, 2021
1337	3	"Hell! Hell! Hell!"	62 minutes	January 12, 2021
1338	4	"The Science of Cute"	58 minutes	January 14, 2021
1339	5	"What does a tire company know about food?"	51 minutes	January 19, 2021
1340	6	"Finding the Fenn Treasure"	54 minutes	January 21, 2021
1341	7	"The KKK: Loathsome Cosplay Rednecks"	62 minutes	January 26, 2021
1342	8	"How Hydropower Works"	56 minutes	January 28, 2021
1343	9	"How Groundhog Day Works"	55 minutes	February 2, 2021
1344	10	"The NAACP"	50 minutes	February 4, 2021
1345	11	"Sacagawea: Impressive Teen"	53 minutes	February 9, 2021
1346	12	"How Housing Discrimination Works"	59 minutes	February 11, 2021
1347	13	"The Disappearance of Lars Mittank"	48 minutes	February 16, 2021
1348	14	"How Blue Holes Work"	42 minutes	February 18, 2021
1349	15	"What Will Farming 4.0 Look Like?"	51 minutes	February 23, 2021
1350	16	"How Bruce Lee Worked"	56 minutes	February 25, 2021
1351	17	"Is the Free Radical Theory of Aging Wrong?"	56 minutes	March 2, 2021
1352	18	"Why is the Equal Rights Amendment still not ratified?"	54 minutes	March 4, 2021
1353	19	"Dragons: As Real as Mermaids"	45 minutes	March 9, 2021
1354	20	"Karaoke: Tuesday Night Fever"	59 minutes	March 11, 2021
1355	21	"The Parrot Episode"	56 minutes	March 16, 2021
1356	22	"The Texas City Disaster of 1947"	46 minutes	March 18, 2021
1357	23	"What is biophilic design?"	56 minutes	March 23, 2021
1358	24	"Space Junk, Ahoy!"	55 minutes	March 25, 2021
1359	25	"How the Titanic Worked: Part One"	53 minutes	March 30, 2021
1360	26	"How the Titanic Worked: Part Two"	55 minutes	April 1, 2021
1361	27	"Havana Syndrome: ¿Qué Diablos?"	48 minutes	April 6, 2021
1362	28	"Muzak: Easy Listening Goodness"	58 minutes	April 8, 2021
1363	29	"How the Electrical Grid Works"	64 minutes	April 13, 2021
1364	30	"Hair Loss: The Pits"	63 minutes	April 15, 2021
1365	31	"Mechanical Bulls!"	52 minutes	April 20, 2021
1366	32	"How Stamp Collecting Works"	61 minutes	April 22, 2021
1367	33	"Truffles: Underground Treasures"	46 minutes	April 27, 2021
1368	34	"How Corporate Taxes Work"	55 minutes	April 29, 2021
1369	35	"The Appendix: No Respect"	49 minutes	May 4, 2021
1370	36	"How Uranium Mining Works"	56 minutes	May 6, 2021
1371	37	"The Ivy League"	55 minutes	May 11, 2021
1372	38	"How Monster Trucks Work"	53 minutes	May 13, 2021
1373	39	"The Cleveland Torso Murders"	54 minutes	May 18, 2021
1374	40	"Girl Scouts: More than cookie sellers"	56 minutes	May 20, 2021
1375	41	"How Cleft Lips and Palates Work"	46 minutes	May 25, 2021
1376	42	"Night Trap: The Video Game Failure that Changed the Industry"	47 minutes	May 27, 2021
1377	43	"What Causes Inflation?"	53 minutes	June 1, 2021
1378	44	"John Muir: Outdoor Enthusiast"	48 minutes	June 3, 2021
1379	45	"Slime Mold: 0% Mold, 100% Amazing"	55 minutes	June 8, 2021
1380	46	"POGs: The 90s in a Bottle Cap"	55 minutes	June 10, 2021
1381	47	"Seven - No, Wait, Five - Mysteries of the Art World"	52 minutes	June 15, 2021
1382	48	"How Venus Works"	46 minutes	June 17, 2021
1383	49	"The Mystery of Damascus Steel"	42 minutes	June 22, 2021
1384	50	"How Faraday Cages Work"	48 minutes	June 24, 2021
1385	51	"Poison Control Centers: A Good Thing"	56 minutes	June 29, 2021
1386	52	"The Grand Ole Opry Cast"	43 minutes	July 1, 2021
1387	53	"The Sad Story of William James Sidis"	46 minutes	July 6, 2021

=== Short Stuff (2021) ===
No. in series	No. in season	Title	Length	Original air date
118	1	"Short Stuff: Is It Theater or Theatre?"	12 minutes	January 6, 2021
119	2	"Short Stuff: Silverfish"	10 minutes	January 13, 2021
120	3	"Short Stuff: Necco"	13 minutes	January 20, 2021
121	4	"Short Stuff: Vantablack"	13 minutes	January 27, 2021
122	5	"Short Stuff: Balloonfest"	14 minutes	February 3, 2021
123	6	"Short Stuff: How California Got Its Name"	13 minutes	February 10, 2021
124	7	"Short Stuff: Freedom House Ambulance Services"	17 minutes	February 17, 2021
125	8	"Short Stuff: The Body in the Cylinder"	15 minutes	February 24, 2021
126	9	"Short Stuff: Dog Suicide Bridge"	13 minutes	March 3, 2021
127	10	"Short Stuff: Tooth Fairy: Not Real"	13 minutes	March 10, 2021
128	11	"Short Stuff: Brazilian Jars"	16 minutes	March 17, 2021
129	12	"Short Stuff: Cellphones on Airplanes"	14 minutes	March 24, 2021
130	13	"Short Stuff: What's the oldest book?"	12 minutes	March 31, 2021
131	14	"Short Stuff: Venus de Milo"	12 minutes	April 7, 2021
132	15	"Short Stuff: Palindromes"	14 minutes	April 14, 2021
133	16	"Short Stuff: Madam C.J. Walker"	14 minutes	April 21, 2021
134	17	"Short Stuff: Ivar The Boneless"	11 minutes	April 28, 2021
135	18	"Short Stuff: Squarer Than Wombat Poop"	13 minutes	May 5, 2021
136	19	"Short Stuff: Garter Snakes"	12 minutes	May 12, 2021
137	20	"Short Stuff: Speed Reading"	14 minutes	May 19, 2021
138	21	"Short Stuff: Parachute Emergency!"	13 minutes	May 26, 2021
139	22	"Short Stuff: Runner's High"	13 minutes	June 2, 2021
140	23	"Short Stuff: Chinatowns"	14 minutes	June 9, 2021
141	24	"Short Stuff: Mojave Megaphone"	13 minutes	June 16, 2021
142	25	"Short Stuff: Chastity Belts"	13 minutes	June 23, 2021
143	26	"Short Stuff: Beast of Gevaudan"	12 minutes	June 30, 2021
144	27	"Short Stuff: Sulfanilamide Disaster"	13 minutes	July 7, 2021
