= List of Stuff You Should Know episodes (2012) =

This is a list of episodes from 2012 for the Stuff You Should Know podcast.

== 2012 season ==
No. in series	No. in season	Title	Length	Original air date
386	1	"How Yo-Yos Work"	31 minutes	January 3, 2012
387	2	"Was there a curse on King Tut’s tomb?"	38 minutes	January 5, 2012
388	3	"Can you vacation in Antarctica?"	36 minutes	January 10, 2012
389	4	"What’s the deal with the Bermuda Triangle?"	44 minutes	January 12, 2012
390	5	"Are contrails actually chemtrails?"	32 minutes	January 17, 2012
391	6	"How Mexican Wrestling Works"	40 minutes	January 19, 2012
392	7	"How Human Trafficking Works"	34 minutes	January 24, 2012
393	8	"How Floods Work"	32 minutes	January 26, 2012
394	9	"How Magic Mushrooms Work"	50 minutes	January 31, 2012
395	10	"What’s the 10,000 Year Clock?"	46 minutes	February 2, 2012
396	11	"Pickpockets: Artists or Crooks?"	32 minutes	February 7, 2012
397	12	"How Coral Reefs Work"	35 minutes	February 9, 2012
398	13	"How Zero Works"	30 minutes	February 14, 2012
399	14	"How Autopsies Work"	49 minutes	February 16, 2012
400	15	"How Spies Work"	43 minutes	February 21, 2012
401	16	"Fasting: deadly or what?"	34 minutes	February 23, 2012
402	17	"How Crying Works"	39 minutes	February 28, 2012
403	18	"How SETI Works"	38 minutes	March 1, 2012
404	19	"Duels: A guide to throwing down the gauntlet"	42 minutes	March 6, 2012
405	20	"How Noah’s Ark Worked"	31 minutes	March 8, 2012
406	21	"Should chimps be used for medical testing?"	32 minutes	March 13, 2012
407	22	"How the Donner Party Worked"	36 minutes	March 15, 2012
408	23	"How Comic Books: Live from SXSW"	56 minutes	March 20, 2012
409	24	"How Tipping Works"	50 minutes	March 22, 2012
410	25	"10 Big Cases of Revenge"	44 minutes	March 27, 2012
411	26	"How Music Sampling Works"	44 minutes	March 29, 2012
412	27	"How Diamonds Work"	40 minutes	April 3, 2012
413	28	"How Beer Works"	48 minutes	April 5, 2012
414	29	"Was Atlantis a real place?"	32 minutes	April 10, 2012
415	30	"Body Odor: You Stink"	45 minutes	April 11, 2012
416	31	"How Whaling Works"	35 minutes	April 17, 2012
417	32	"Social Security Numbers: Less Boring Than You’d Think"	38 minutes	April 19, 2012
418	33	"How Air Traffic Control Works"	39 minutes	April 24, 2012
419	34	"How Medical Marijuana Works"	33 minutes	April 26, 2012
420	35	"How did language evolve?"	27 minutes	May 1, 2012
421	36	"How Bullfighting Works"	44 minutes	May 3, 2012
422	37	"Did the Dutch trade Manhattan for nutmeg?"	34 minutes	May 8, 2012
423	38	"What is a shotgun house?"	23 minutes	May 10, 2012
424	39	"Interpol: World Police"	32 minutes	May 15, 2012
425	40	"What is the future of Earth?"	33 minutes	May 17, 2012
426	41	"How Labor Unions Work"	48 minutes	May 22, 2012
427	42	"Are we obsessed with goals?"	40 minutes	May 24, 2012
428	43	"Do video games produce real-life violence?"	32 minutes	May 29, 2012
429	44	"Can it rain frogs?"	25 minutes	May 31, 2012
430	45	"How Moss Works"	32 minutes	June 5, 2012
431	46	"Fractals: Whoa"	34 minutes	June 7, 2012
432	47	"Should we have a fat tax?"	35 minutes	June 12, 2012
433	48	"Whatever happened to acid rain?"	30 minutes	June 14, 2012
434	49	"How Icebergs Work (Very Cool)"	38 minutes	June 19, 2012
435	50	"10 Accidental Inventions: By the Numbers"	36 minutes	June 21, 2012
436	51	"Lying Liars: How Lying Works, Liar"	50 minutes	June 26, 2012
437	52	"What’s the deal with Executive Orders?"	34 minutes	June 28, 2012
438	53	"Is the Dead Sea dead?"	26 minutes	July 3, 2012
439	54	"How Tabloids Work"	50 minutes	July 5, 2012
440	55	"Geysers: Nature’s Innuendo"	28 minutes	July 10, 2012
441	56	"How Lightning Works"	39 minutes	July 12, 2012
442	57	"How Disco Works"	48 minutes	July 17, 2012
443	58	"Did a cow start the Great Chicago Fire?"	28 minutes	July 19, 2012
444	59	"How White-collar Crime Works"	44 minutes	July 24, 2012
445	60	"How Time Travel Works (Live at SD Comic-Con)"	27 minutes	July 26, 2012
446	61	"How the Musketeers Worked"	29 minutes	July 31, 2012
447	62	"Can we build an elevator to space?"	30 minutes	August 2, 2012
448	63	"How Ramadan Works"	31 minutes	August 7, 2012
449	64	"How Shark Attacks Work"	39 minutes	August 9, 2012
450	65	"The Shark Diaries"	40 minutes	August 14, 2012
451	66	"Did Reagan’s Star Wars program win the Cold War?"	34 minutes	August 16, 2012
452	67	"Why You Probably Have a Criminal Record"	31 minutes	August 21, 2012
453	68	"What happens to abandoned mines?"	26 minutes	August 23, 2012
454	69	"How the Electoral College Works"	41 minutes	August 28, 2012
455	70	"How Flesh-eating Bacteria Work"	27 minutes	August 30, 2012
456	71	"Can you test a nuclear weapon without a fallout?"	29 minutes	September 4, 2012
457	72	"Bioluminescence: A Bright and Shiny Fish"	36 minutes	September 6, 2012
458	73	"How Asexuality Works"	34 minutes	September 11, 2012
459	74	"How Book Banning Works"	30 minutes	September 13, 2012
460	75	"Are we all Martians?"	28 minutes	September 18, 2012
461	76	"Why does music provoke emotion?"	64 minutes	September 20, 2012
462	77	"Q: Are we in the midst of cyberwar? A: Yes"	28 minutes	September 25, 2012
463	78	"Subways: HUH! What are they good for?"	43 minutes	September 27, 2012
464	79	"How Whiskey Runners Worked"	30 minutes	October 2, 2012
465	80	"How Fire Works"	28 minutes	October 4, 2012
466	81	"How Rainforests Work"	40 minutes	October 9, 2012
467	82	"How Pizza Works!"	51 minutes	October 11, 2012
468	83	"How Black Holes Work"	31 minutes	October 16, 2012
469	84	"How Lion Taming Works"	28 minutes	October 18, 2012
470	85	"How Commercial Jingles Work"	35 minutes	October 23, 2012
471	86	"Exoskeletons: How’s it coming?"	31 minutes	October 25, 2012
472	87	"SYSK’s Halloween Horror Fiction Winner!"	24 minutes	October 30, 2012
473	88	"Is Stockholm Syndrome real?"	34 minutes	November 1, 2012
474	89	"Yakuza: From Samurai to Slot Machines"	37 minutes	November 6, 2012
475	90	"What will happen when we reach the Singularity?"	40 minutes	November 8, 2012
476	91	"How close are we to holographic environments?"	24 minutes	November 13, 2012
477	92	"How Meth Works"	48 minutes	November 15, 2012
478	93	"Should we be designing our children?"	35 minutes	November 20, 2012
479	94	"Philanthropy: Humankind and Loving It"	46 minutes	November 22, 2012
480	95	"Why do leaves change colors in the fall?"	24 minutes	November 27, 2012
481	96	"How Caving Works"	50 minutes	November 29, 2012
482	97	"How Vampires Work"	49 minutes	December 4, 2012
483	98	"Will we reach peak oil?"	38 minutes	December 6, 2012
484	99	"Why isn’t the U.S. on the metric system?"	37 minutes	December 11, 2012
485	100	"How Condoms Work"	62 minutes	December 13, 2012
486	101	"Lab-grown meat: Order up!"	29 minutes	December 18, 2012
487	102	"How Barbie® Doll Works"	62 minutes	December 20, 2012
488	103	"Josh and Chuck’s Christmas Extravaganza 2012"	46 minutes	December 21, 2012
489	104	"How Dog Shows Work"	41 minutes	December 27, 2012
