= List of Old Harry's Game episodes =

This is a list of episodes of the BBC Radio 4 comedy Old Harry's Game. All episodes were written by Andy Hamilton and produced by Paul Mayhew-Archer. All titles are taken from the BBC episode guide.

== Series overview ==
Season	Episodes	Originally released		CD release date
Season	Episodes	First released	Last released	CD release date
1	6	November 23, 1995	December 28, 1995	September 11, 2008
2	6	April 7, 1998	May 12, 1998	September 11, 2008
3	6	March 24, 1999	April 28, 1999	September 3, 2009
4	6	March 29, 2001	May 3, 2001	September 3, 2009
S	2	December 31, 2002	January 1, 2003	November 3, 2003
5	4	September 20, 2005	October 11, 2005	March 5, 2007
6	6	September 27, 2007	November 1, 2007	November 5, 2007
7	6	February 19, 2009	March 26, 2009	April 9, 2009
S	2	December 23, 2010	December 30, 2010	October 6, 2011
S	2	July 12, 2012	July 19, 2012	—N/a

== Episodes ==
=== Series 1 (1995) ===
No. overall	No. in series	Title	Original release date
1	1	"Welcome to Hell"	23 November 1995
Satan and his demon assistant Gary greet two new arrivals in Hell, Thomas Quentin Crimp, who tries to bribe and lie his way out, and Professor Richard Wittington, who refuses to accept he is in Hell, believing himself to not be dead but in a coma.
2	2	"Corruption"	30 November 1995
In an attempt to prove to the Professor that all humans are corrupt by nature, Satan twice tries to seduce the Professor's wife. Meanwhile in Hell, Gary creates a golf course and plays a round with Thomas, who tries to get Gary to destroy the Professor forever.
3	3	"Hero Worship"	7 December 1995
Satan and Gary show the Professor the disgusting and violent marine creature humans evolved from, while Thomas tries to dig his way out of Hell using a spoon found in his cell. Satan then takes the Professor to meet his heroes in Hell to show him they are not all what they seem.
4	4	"Appearances"	14 December 1995
Satan is frustrated with the lack of time in Hell and makes Gary become a clock to measure the passing time. Satan and the Professor tour the living world to see if Man's behavior is shaped by nature or nurture. Meanwhile in Hell, Thomas sows the seeds of rebellion in Gary.
5	5	"Rebellion"	21 December 1995
Satan and the Professor search for the nature of happiness. Gary and Thomas begin their putsch, which fails.
6	6	"Redemption"	28 December 1995
Gary is put on trial for rebellion, Thomas accidentally summons God (David Swift) (real name Nigel), and the Professor ruins his chance of getting into heaven by annoying God.

=== Series 2 (1998) ===
No. overall	No. in series	Title	Original release date
7	1	"Assistant"	7 April 1998
Satan searches for a new chief assistant. Scumspawn is eager to get the post, but Satan is not convinced. Meanwhile, The Professor makes a bet with Satan that he can help Thomas change...and finds that he's got his work cut out for him.
8	2	"Chuckles"	14 April 1998
Satan chooses a new assistant - Chuckles, the evil dolphin, who comes up with a particularly evil plan to reveal The Professor's dark side and finally break his spirit, while The Professor reminisces about a former colleague who stole his research.
9	3	"Nero"	21 April 1998
Roman emperor Nero assumes the role of Satan's assistant and is put in charge of Hell while Satan takes Thomas and The Professor on a trip to show Thomas the consequences of his life's actions and how they have affected other people.
10	4	"Computers"	28 April 1998
Satan's latest choice for a new assistant is an artificially intelligent computer, which Scumspawn has trouble relating with. Meanwhile, two new arrivals have turned up in Hell: an Islamic suicide bomber who has died for nothing and is worried about his less-intelligent younger brother who's about to suffer the same fate, and Thomas' former Personal Assistant Ms. Frobisher for whose suicide Thomas is responsible.
11	5	"G.U.T."	5 May 1998
Satan tells the Professor the Grand Unifying Theory that explains the working of the universe, a theory that The Professor naturally wants to share with all mankind...and Satan is only too happy to oblige, since he believes that mankind wouldn't be able to use the information wisely.
12	6	"Too Far"	12 May 1998
Satan has the Grand Unifying Theory published in the living world under the Professor's name with interesting results (especially for The Professor's back-stabbing former colleague). He also orders Scumspawn (who's annoyed Satan once too often) to eat himself, but events take a surprising turn for everybody both in Hell and in Heaven.

=== Series 3 (1999) ===
No. overall	No. in series	Title	Original release date
13	1	"This Thing Called Love"	24 March 1999
Satan reveals to The Professor that his widow Deborah is going to be married to a former jockey named Rory. When The Professor learns just before the wedding is about to take place that Rory may be crooked, he pleads with Satan to stop the wedding somehow, but are his motives as pure as he thinks them? Satan doesn't think so. Also, a secret about a certain BBC news presenter is revealed. Note: The references to Jill Dando were changed to Gaby Roslin for repeats.
14	2	"Another Country"	31 March 1999
The repercussions from The Professor's interference make themselves felt most strongly when his widow reveals a particularly intimate fact about him that he never even suspected. Meanwhile, Scumspawn seeks advice from Thomas about how to be a better demon.
15	3	"A Four-Letter Word"	7 April 1999
When a would-be film maker arrives in Hell, Satan allows him to make his movie in order to prove that humans are never satisfied. The film maker casts The Professor, Thomas and Scumspawn in his film, and the production not only seems to bring out hidden talents in Thomas and Scumspawn but also seems to be restoring The Professor's self-confidence.
16	4	"The Reasonably Fantastic Journey"	14 April 1999
Satan and The Professor take a trip into and through first Scumspawn's brain and then Thomas', where The Professor hopes to uncover the reason why Thomas is the way he is. Meanwhile, Scumspawn reveals another hidden talent.
17	5	"The Beautiful Game"	21 April 1999
Satan stages an Infernal version of the World Cup in Hell to prove that events like this will always end up in chaos. Scumspawn is the Chief Official, The Professor is chosen to coach for England and, to everyone's surprise, he chooses Thomas to captain for England. Note: The references to Jill Dando were changed to Gaby Roslin for repeats.
18	6	"The Final Reckoning"	28 April 1999
After encountering an extremely depressed Deborah in the world of the living, The Professor pleads with Satan to help him make things right for her. However, a deputation of angels, led by the Angel Graham, has arrived in Hell and they intend on enforcing God's orders to crack down on any rule-breaking (which includes taking mortals back to the world of Men), and if he's caught the consequences for Satan could be worse than severe...

=== Series 4 (2001) ===
No. overall	No. in series	Title	Original release date
19	1	"Knowledge & Ignorance"	29 March 2001
In another one of their famous arguments, Satan attempts to prove to The Professor that Knowledge can be more dangerous than Ignorance, during which The Professor is given a revelation about himself and his family. Meanwhile, Scumspawn and Thomas try to relax with a game of table tennis.
20	2	"Beautiful England"	5 April 2001
The Professor is very proud to be British, which causes Satan to take him on another tour about the world of Men to show him what the British are really like, while Scumspawn and Thomas face the problem of how to torment a new arrival: a particularly belligerant and abusive "yobbo" who doesn't seem to feel physical pain (and who died while drunkenly trying to fight a rhino bare-handed).
21	3	"Health & Safety"	12 April 2001
Derek, a Health and Safety Inspector, is a new arrival in Hell and his views and comments are giving Satan a major headache. On a more serious note, The Professor's widow Deborah is involved in a potentially fatal accident and The Professor (who still loves her) may not entirely clear in his own mind and heart about whether he wants her to live or die (since if she dies she will be sent to Hell, where he will be reunited with her).
22	4	"Poets Corner"	19 April 2001
A line in a poem by W. B. Yeats annoys Satan so much by its ambiguity (because it may refer to him) that he and The Professor go off to Poets' Corner in Hell's Writers' Block to find Yeats and get him to explain what the poem really means, leaving Scumspawn and Thomas to indulge in a little poetry-writing of their own.
23	5	"Sleep"	26 April 2001
Satan, in The Professor's view, is a manic personality since he has never been able to go to sleep, so Sigmund Freud and Carl Jung are summoned up to try to help The Prince of Darkness to experience sleep for the first time, a situation that Thomas wants to take deadly advantage of.
24	6	"Beauty"	3 May 2001
A discussion about beauty causes Satan to summon up Helen of Troy and her plain girlfriend Daphne. Thomas naturally wants to "get to know" the self-absorbed Helen, while Scumspawn seems quite taken with the far-more-intelligent Daphne. During all this, God visits Hell with a major case of the blues, a situation in which Satan sees possibilities.

=== Christmas specials (2002–3) ===
No. overall	No. in series	Title	Original release date
25	1	"The Roll of the Dice"	31 December 2002
Hope, a Salvation Army worker who's led a sinless life and believes in God, arrives in Hell, much to the puzzlement of Satan. The problem increases when they find out that she's also prematurely dead by more than fifty years. Meanwhile, The Professor's been turned into a blue bottle fly and Thomas (who's been painted in zebra-like stripes) has a date with Satan's special crocodiles.
26	2	"Knocking on Heaven's Door"	1 January 2003
Satan, Scumspawn and Hope search for Death to try to get him to correct his mistake. When Death refuses (for fear of litigation), Satan decides that since Hope can't be restored to life, she should be in Heaven instead of Hell. The trio manage to get to the Pearly Gates and meet with St. Peter, and thanks to some blackmailing by Satan Hope gets waved in. Meanwhile, Thomas finally keeps his date with Satan's special crocodiles (they're special because they have a sense of humour). Note: This is the final recording that James Grout performed as The Professor.

=== Series 5 (2005) ===
No. overall	No. in series	Title	Original release date
27	1	"Moral Leadership"	20 September 2005
With Hell becoming overcrowded, Satan takes his plan of expanding Hell and Hell's workforce to God, but God will not allow it. Satan then decides that it's up to him to lower the evil done by man in the world, thereby lowering the rate of influx of souls into Hell. Note: Archive audio of James Grout is used in this episode.
28	2	"The Crusade"	27 September 2005
Starting with religion as a force for good in the world, Satan disguises himself as various religious leaders at meetings of all the major religions, and Scumspawn puts his mechanical skills to the test in an effort to help.
29	3	"Power Politics"	4 October 2005
Having failed with religion, Satan turns to politics on his moral crusade. Meanwhile, Roland, a new arrival in Hell who may be even more slimy than Thomas, starts a plan of his own with Thomas' help.
30	4	"I Blame the Media"	11 October 2005
In his quest to improve mankind, Satan turns to the media, while thanks to Roland rebellion brews in Hell.

=== Series 6 (2007) ===
No. overall	No. in series	Title	Original release date
31	1	"Edith"	27 September 2007
Edith Barrington, a historian and Thomas' former mother-in-law, arrives in Hell, but (like The Professor before her) refuses to admit that she is dead. After learning that her cause of death is officially listed as suicide, she makes a deal with Satan in which he will investigate her death and she will write his biography.
32	2	"Discoveries"	4 October 2007
In researching Satan's biography, Edith discovers that nearly everyone in the Bible is in Hell, with Adam and Eve being Neanderthals. After Scumspawn uses hypnosis on Thomas, Satan uses it on Edith and finds out that she was actually murdered.
33	3	"Murderers"	11 October 2007
In his search for Edith's murderer, Satan convenes a symposium of famous murderers in Hell for help. Meanwhile, the fires of Hell are going out, much to Scumspawn's chagrin.
34	4	"Psychiatry"	18 October 2007
After Satan obtains Edith's police file, Edith interviews him to get his version of his expulsion from Heaven. They then go to Agatha Christie and Arthur Conan Doyle to get their insights into Edith's murder investigation. Meanwhile, Scumspawn uses a psychiatry book to try to help Thomas.
35	5	"Investigation"	25 October 2007
Scumspawn tries to deal with a surge of new arrivals using Thomas to help process them, but then the two must deal with an attempted breakout, while Satan believes he has uncovered Edith's killer - her best friend Rosemary.
36	6	"Ginger"	1 November 2007
Satan goes to great lengths to prove that Rosemary was Edith's killer, Edith learns about a scandal involving angels that God tried to cover up with a Flood and Thomas learns a fact about his ancestry which makes him even more insufferable.

=== Series 7 (2009) ===
No. overall	No. in series	Title	Original release date
37	1	"Scamp"	19 February 2009
When a dog arrives unexpectedly in Hell, Satan attempts to talk to God about both the new arrival and a possible plan to ease the general overcrowding in Hell (involving destroying 75% of the damned). Unfortunately, he can't because God is bored with Satan and indeed with his whole Creation, and has left in charge two rather insufferable "cloud jockeys" (i.e., angels) who are more interested in admiring their laminated "site manager" badges than actually doing anything.
38	2	"Satan"	26 February 2009
Heaven's new computer system is having software problems, causing a further unexpected arrival in Hell - a baby - and because God has gone away for some "me time", Satan's renewed attempts to get help from God bring him face to face with the Archangel Gabriel, who's been left in charge. Meanwhile, Scumspawn decides the baby needs a name and dubs it "Satan Junior". Taking care of the baby, and of the dog Scamp in particular, begins to bring out the best in Thomas, while Satan's meeting with Gabriel brings some slight results.
39	3	"Papoose"	5 March 2009
Satan attempts to identify the baby via a governmental database (whose data has been misplaced), while a mass breakout in Hell causes Joan of Arc to take Edith, Thomas, the dog Scamp and the baby hostage, and Edith, who wrote a biography of Joan, learns that she got quite a few facts wrong.
40	4	"Persuaded"	12 March 2009
After finally being apprised of the situation, God (Timothy West) orders Satan to arrange with Gabriel for both the dog and the baby's immediate transfers to Heaven. Since people in both Heaven and Hell remain forever the same age they were when they died, this would mean that the baby would remain a baby and never have a chance to live out a full life, a fact that distresses Scumspawn and Edith so much that they manage to convince Satan to disobey God's orders and try to return the baby to the world of the living.
41	5	"Adoption"	19 March 2009
Armed with a list compiled by Scumspawn, Satan tries to find adoptive parents for the baby (now identified as Patrick), while Edith has a major crisis of confidence concerning her completed biography of Satan. The dog Scamp is successfully transferred to Heaven (with one or two minor incidents), but with the aid of some Photoshopped pictures Satan blackmails Gabriel into helping him about the baby.
42	6	"Return"	26 March 2009
Not only is Satan having problems with a new arrival (a talentless but totally determined female X Factor competitor), but a very angry God returns to put Satan and Gabriel on trial for not obeying His instructions about what should be done with the baby. Despite quickly degenerating into a shambles, the trial manages to resolve itself into a relatively happy conclusion.

=== Christmas specials (2010) ===
No. overall	No. in series	Title	Original release date
43	1	"Christmas Spirit"	23 December 2010
Satan decides to ban Christmas. During a visitation to the world of Men he disguises himself as various religious figures, including the Pope, in order to more effectively denounce Christmas; and then impersonates the Editor of the Daily Mail newspaper so as to publish made-up headlines undermining Christmas, such as "Mince Pies cause Cancer". However, in Hell the Spirit of Christmas is alive and well, thanks to Scumspawn's efforts to cheer up Edith.
44	2	"Ring in the New"	30 December 2010
Satan decides he needs a holiday. On Edith's advice he heads off to the English Lake District for some New Year solitude, leaving Scumspawn in charge of Hell. But Scumspawn isn't sure his leadership skills are up to the task, and a management seminar with Genghis Khan, Winston Churchill, Gandhi, Queen Elizabeth I and football manager Brian Clough proves no help.

=== Olympics specials (2012) ===
No. overall	No. in series	Title	Original release date
45	1	"Olympics special 1"	12 July 2012
Satan attempts to show Edith that the ancient Greeks and the original Games were not as altruistic as she originally thought and Thomas' participation in the Infernal Olympic Games ends up a crushing and painful disaster. This episode is dedicated to the memory of James Grout
46	2	"Olympics special 2"	19 July 2012
Satan is blackmailed by Edith into taking her to the 2012 London Olympics to see her competing grand-niece and discovers that the grand-niece isn't quite as Edith described (or even remembered) her, and Thomas tries to get himself certified insane to escape further eternal punishment (and be eternally consigned to Hell's TV Lounge). This episode is dedicated to the memory of James Grout
