= List of Planet B episodes =

Planet B is a science fiction drama series first broadcast on BBC Radio 7 on 2 March 2009 as part of BBC Radio's science fiction season between February and March 2009. Planet B is set in a virtual world called "Planet B" (voiced by Adjoa Andoh) in which people play as life-size avatars. The first series follows John Armstrong (played by Gunnar Cauthery in Series 1 and 3) who attempts to find girlfriend Lioba Fielding (Donnla Hughes in Series 1, Tessa Nicholson in Series 2) who is dead in the real world but alive in Planet B. As he travels between various worlds he becomes entangled in an array of strange scenarios, teleporting from each adventure to the next with his companion Medley (Lizzy Watts in Series 1, Claire Harry in Series 3), a "rogue avatar" who has no human controller. All the while, John and Medley are being watched by a dog-like antivirus programme called Cerberus (Chris Pavlo) who, along with the Planet B Corporation, considers the rogues to be a computer virus that need to be wiped out.

In the second series, Lioba is on the run from Planet B and travels the virtual world with computer games expert Kip Berenger (Joseph Cohen-Cole in Series 2, Lloyd Thomas in Series 3) after they are attacked by Cerberus.

The third series revolves around the impending shut-down of Planet B in favour of the upgraded Planet B Platinum.

The drama series was created by Sam Hoyle, Jessica Dromgoole and Matthew Broughton with James Robinson. The first series ran for ten episodes and was BBC Radio 7's biggest ever commission for an original drama series.

== Episodes ==
=== Series 1 ===
No.	Title	Directed by	Written by	Original release date
1	"Golden Moments"	Jessica Dromgoole	Matthew Broughton	2 March 2009
John enters Planet B and visits "Golden Moments", which allows the user to relive their favourite memories. However, the programme suffers from a fault which causes it to replay Lioba's funeral. John learns from Medley that there is a rift within the system and Lioba's funeral is the eye of the problem. John then comes across memories that are not his and begins to believe that Lioba is still alive in Planet B. John and Medley enter into the rift in order to track her down. Cerberus meanwhile is tracking down a virus in the retro games section of Planet B.
2	"New Boy"	Jessica Dromgoole	Matthew Broughton	3 March 2009
John and Medley enter a game called "School Days". In it, points are scored by bullying the other pupils. However, John discovers that he can feel pain and possibly feel other things within Planet B. When it is discovered that a virus is in the system, Lioba and Cerberus enter into the game as school inspectors in an attempt to find the virus. John learns the Lioba might be one of the inspectors and begins to play the game in the hope that he will get into so much trouble that he will be forced to see the inspectors. John and Medley however are removed from the game before they get a chance to meet her.
3	"Freakshow"	Pam Marshall	Dawn King	4 March 2009
John and Medley end up in "Fame Show", in which users display their various talents in order to become world famous. John finds fame by being "The Angry Man" and uses his celebrity status in order to notify people about his search for Lioba. It is soon discovered that Fame Show is a con - no-one gets to the top and it is just designed to get users to pay money, so they leave the site. Before he does though, another user tells John that Medley is not human. Meanwhile, Lioba finds a virus which looks like John.
4	"New Rome"	Pam Marshall	Simon Bowen	5 March 2009
John and Medley are transported to "New Rome", where people live in splendour and act out their most kinky and perverted fantasies, while having software slaves doing all the work. John gets angry over the treatment of the slaves and frees one, but it is not long before they are caught and are thrown to the lions. Medley tells John that she is not a virus, but a rogue avatar with no human controller, as are many of New Rome's prisoners. Medley also learns she is to lead the rogues to freedom. Lioba learns more about the rogue avatars, although Cerberus wants to destroy them. John eventually convinces the Emperor to free him after he makes a speech in support of freeing the slaves and rogues. Lioba and Cerberus track down the rogues in New Rome where they encounter John and Medley, unfortunately John and Medley teleport away from New Rome just as they meet. Guest starring Josef Altin as Chi.
5	"The Smart Money"	Jessica Dromgoole	Paul May	6 March 2009
John and Medley end up in the "Exchange", in which people by and sell commodities, but if they fail to get enough credits then they lose their avatar. The commodities being sold are emotions, which Medley plans to use so that she and the other rogue avatars can become more human. Lioba spots viral activity in the Exchange and so sells her positive emotions on the market as a way of tracking them. When John discovers the emotions are Lioba's, he swaps them all for his sense of caution. As he does, Cerberus traps them, but one trader, the Wheeler Dealer, rescues them. Just before John and Medley teleport again, John hears a now much more emotionless Lioba.
6	"The Wild Gang"	Jeremy Mortimer	Matthew Broughton	9 March 2009
John and Medley land in a game set in the Wild West, where John is the sheriff. There, he encounters the vile Chuck Flint and his gang, and local marshal Steve Childs, whose wife's avatar is an empty shell and his artificial daughter has been stolen by the gang. Cerberus is also in the game for a spot of rest, while Lioba is put through a series of tests to examine her lack of emotion. John helps Steve get his daughter back, but Steve betrays them by swapping his daughter for John and Medley as hostages. John is sent into the desert where Lioba meets him and tells John not to look for her. John however is saved by Steve and John returns to kill Chuck. As they about to draw however, Chuck and his gang are killed by Cerberus. He also shoots Medley, although this turns out to be a decoy. John is about to shoot himself because of what Lioba told him, but he and Medley teleport just as he pulls the trigger. Guest starring David Bedella as Chuck Flint.
7	"Catharsis"	Colin Guthrie	Dawn King	10 March 2009
John teleports into a new game set on a space ship in future. However, the game is so realistic that John has forgotten who he is, believing himself to be the actual captain. Lioba and Cerberus are ordered to enter the game and give a download to a certain avatar who is one of the crew, with Lioba assuming the avatar is a virus. The ship's crew encounter an alien, who is in fact Medley. She tries to make John remember who he is but fails and is imprisoned. The ship then gets attacked and Medley is freed due to a power failure. She meets up with John and again makes tries to make him remember, which she does. It turns out the game was developed by a user pretending to be the ship's doctor, whose avatar is deleted by Lioba before she gives her the download. It turns out she was a human user that Planet B was offering a job to. Cerberus teleports Lioba out and decides to take the rap for what happened. John tells Medley that he wants to die on his ship and Medley tells him that she cannot let him do so because she needs him in order to live. They both teleport before the ship is destroyed.
8	"Retreat"	Colin Guthrie	Thomas Crowe	11 March 2009
John and Medley find themselves in a strange religious retreat, which appears to be a cult with people paying subscriptions and mosquitoes that act as plug-ins. The retreat's abbot, whose name is "Unpronounceable", also has a secret orphanage which looks after child rogues. He shows Medley a device called the "Circuit Mendela", which causes her to feel real emotions which are her own instead of a human user's. Lioba and Cerberus enter the retreat as part of their mission of adding a new software patch to the site, but when she discovers Unpronounceable's ambitions for the rogues she deletes him, orders the site to be destroyed and for the rogue children to be deleted. John and Medley escort the children to safety while Lioba deletes Unpronounceable. Cerberus decides not to delete the children, which results in Lioba deleting him. The children teleport out of the site before Lioba can delete them, who herself is forced out of the game by Cerberus under orders from his bosses. John and Lioba teleport before the site is removed.
9	"The Fast Track"	James Robinson	Paul May	12 March 2009
John and Medley land in a racing game, but are stopped by Cerberus who wants Lioba's emotions. They manage to escape him, but as the road is a looped track, they come across Cerberus again who challenges them to a game in which there is a chance they might die. John takes the challenge on, but teleports before he crashes into a medieval game. Lioba is tested to see how she reacts to users and virals and is eventually tested against herself. As the other version of herself is a viral, she concludes that it and herself must be deleted. John takes part in a jousting match to finally meet what he thinks is Lioba, while Medley is suspected of being a witch. She manages to convince the other players she is a rogue and encourages the others to rebel. Medley learns how John teleports - a combination of thinking about Lioba and a sudden shock, such as coming close to death. John uses this knowledge to teleport to Lioba and give her back her emotions. They agree to leave Planet B and meet at their old pub.
10	"Death's Door"	Jessica Dromgoole	Matthew Broughton	13 March 2009
John and Lioba do manage to meet up in the real world, but Lioba soon falls ill. She has a rash which eventually bleeds. They go to a hospital and John discovers that one of the nurses is Medley, meaning that he is still in Planet B. The illness is the "Virus patch", designed to kill the rogues. Cerberus, under new management, is ordered to help in the killing of the rogues. John and Medley check the hospital records and discover that Lioba has no medical record. Lioba has no body, meaning that she cannot leave Planet B. As John does not want to leave Lioba, he also decides to stay in Planet B. Medley helps change the machine in the hospital used to kill the rogues so it instead deletes the patch, thus curing Lioba. John, Medley and Lioba team up in order to prevent more people coming to the hospital - Medley inspires the rogues and Lioba solves the technical problems. Eventually, Cerberus confronts them. Medley battles with him while John and Lioba flee together.

=== Series 2 ===
No.	Title	Directed by	Written by	Original release date
1	"The Tender Trap"	James Robinson	Matthew Broughton	29 November 2009
A computer games nerd called Kip is looking for a girlfriend on a Planet B dating site called "The Spark". He goes on a date with Noush, who reveals herself to be a rogue avatar. The relationship starts well, but Kip finds Noush too obsessed with him and leaves. Kip attempts to date other users but Noush keeps breaking the relationships up and goes insane. Kip then discovers Lioba on the run from Planet B's security and Kip helps her flee. In order to jump from the site, Kip and Lioba need to fully embrace each other. Lioba refuses, but then Noush attempts to kill her. They flee, but then come into contact with Cerberus. Cerberus attempts to kill them both but Noush interrupts to save Kip and tries to kill Cerberus. Lioba and Kip flee, embrace each other, and jump into another site.
2	"Make A Wish"	Jessica Dromgoole	Mike Carey	6 December 2009
Kip and Lioba land in place where two worlds have merged: a modern war game called "Desert Killzone", and the Arabian Nights. Lioba meets up with Sinbad the Sailor who is in search of the magic lamp in order to protect Baghdad, while Kip is in an artillery regiment led by Abanaazar, who is also searching for the lamp and plans to use it to invade the city. Kip and Lioba both make their way to the cave where the lamp is hidden, with Lioba and Sinbad reaching it first and finding the lamp. Kip arrives soon afterwards and his men attempt to resist Abanaazar. They fail, but Lioba uses the lamp and the genie in it to stop Abanaazar. With the world saved, Lioba wishes that she and Kip were - just for once - in a more normal world, which causes them to jump when the genie grants her the wish.
3	"Paradise Hazard"	Jessica Dromgoole	Steve Sunderland	13 December 2009
Lioba and Kip land in Happy Valley, a world set in a seemingly perfect American town that is so realistic that Lioba is convinced that the world is real. Lioba and Kip are married, Lioba is pregnant and Kip is working as an advertising executive for a firm that is controlling Happy Valley. The town is surrounded by a security fence which is monitored by Cerberus, but Lioba does not recognise him and vice versa. Kip and the other organise a lynching, on a suspicious resident Madeline. Madeline then shakes Lioba out of her delusion, who then recognises Cerberus and shakes him out of his delusion. It is discovered that Cerberus at one point loved Medley. When the head of Happy Valley, Everett, learns who Medley is, paranoia spreads and Kip takes her to the lynching to be killed as well. However, as the lynching is about to start, Cerberus arrives and kills the head of Happy Valley. Kip, Lioba and Madeline flee to the fence. Madeline frees Kip from the delusion and it is learned that the site is an experiment and it is discussed that Planet B must be killing people in the real world. Cerberus comes to the fence and create a hole to another world, which slowly kills him. Kip and Lioba flee while Madeline runs back to save her fake child.
4	"Light City"	Colin Guthrie	Dawn King	20 December 2009
Lioba and Kip jump into a computer game called "Light City". Kip enters as a criminal where he scores points for committing crimes, whereas Lioba is a member of the police and scores points for solving and preventing them. In the game, they come into contact with a character called "The Shiver", a masked vigilante who attempts to kill criminals. Kip meets some old friends who played the game with him previously and learns that they too are dead, or "Have Nots". Lioba and Kip then learn that a drug called "Real" is spreading around the city, which gives people sensations they can only experience in real life. Real is addictive. Kip's old friend Ed dies of a Real overdose. Lioba and Kip try to discover where the "Real" is coming, and they learn that the chief of Light City police, Trent, is the one responsible for the spread. However, he is killed by The Shiver, who is one of Lioba's fellow officers, Reiva. When the leave the site, Lioba finds herself in a world which is pitch black.
5	"Dark Star"	Jeremy Mortimer	Matthew Broughton	27 December 2009
Lioba is alone on a boat in an empty ocean in the pitch black world. There she is attacked by various monsters including a hydra, but then hears a voice, which turns out to be Kip, whom she rescues. They discovered that the site they are in is "The Underworld", a quest site containing elements of Greek mythology which was taken offline. They are attacked by the hydra again and their boat sinks. They then spot another boat which rescues them. Their rescuer ("Fabian") tells them that they are to undergo three more trials - one for Kip, one for Lioba and one together - and if they complete them they can return to a better time that allows them to rewrite their future. If they fail, they will be trapped in the site and made to make dull tasks forever like Sisyphus. Their guide tells them that there is an overspill of people entering Planet B because the world is dying and that Cerberus now works for the guide, having no memory of his past. During Kip's test, an envoy called Blend comes claiming to have a message from Medley, but the temptation to save the world with her is his trial. He rejects the offer and passes. However, Lioba fails her test and as a result turns into Gorgon. In the final test, Kip has to slay the Lioba/Gorgon. It turns out the guide wants Lioba to win so that he can become more powerful. Lioba realises that their guide is Hades and that the only way to stop him is for Lioba to look at her reflection and turn into stone, killing her and stopping him. Cerberus is free from Hades's control. Kip cries as he realises that he has committed murder, and Cerberus calls him master.

=== Series 3 ===
No.	Title	Directed by	Written by	Original release date
1	"Haunted"	James Robinson	Dawn King	30 January 2011
The series begins with news reports about the world ending, including Manhattan flooding and food riots. The co-founder of Planet B, Mark Schwartz, is interviewed and says Planet B is a failure and he plans to make changes. Elsewhere, some hikers in a virtual Black Forest designed by Lioba: one a Have Not from "Desert Killzone" called Cole, another a rogue. Cole however begins to have strange dreams that the others can see and he reveals himself to be Kip. His fellow hickers consider him to be a murderer. Kip finds something in the forest at night. He and the hickers run from it, but one of the hickers gets caught. After getting lost and returning to camp, the voice talks to them and claims to be Medley, back from the dead. She reveals that when rogues die their code becomes part of the fabric of Planet B and she was able to remake herself, but she is not complete. She needs the rest of the code, made by Lioba, to complete herself and to prevent Schwartz from deleting the rogues. Soon another member of the camp, Hope the leader, is killed. Medley, soon complete, keeps talking to Kip and helps him find a way out of the forest. Medley reveals that killed hikers are using software called VOID to delete the site to make way for Planet B Platinum - a new site which will kill the Have Nots, and then shut off Planet B to kill the rogues. Kip tries to kill it by getting the void to enter itself. However, a tree falls on top of him. Medley and a fellow rogue lift the tree up and free him, but a rogue is killed by the VOID. Schwartz announces that the VOID is designed to transfer Have Not safely to Platinum. Cerberus then enters, fully upgraded and more violent. Medley then fights him and she and Kip jump to another world - a pirate world, and are pushed overboard a ship.
2	"The Pirate Islands"	Nicole Fitzpatrick	Penelope Skinner	6 February 2011
After being pushed overboard in the "Pirate Islands" game, Kip and Medley swim to an island. They land in a harbour and make their way to the ship that sunk them, the Mermaid's Revenge, but the pirates, who are rogues, capture them, so Kip asks for a parlay. The two are chained to the mast and meet the Captain, Mary. One of the programmes, a voodoo priest called Abigail, reveals that Lioba left him a treasure map that only he can access. As the ship sails they come in contact with a new ship, the Black Dog, which is captained by Cerberus who plans to capture the Mermaid's Revenge. The two ships fight each other, but Abigail summons a spell to change the direction of the wind and blows Cerberus off course. The Mermaid's Revenge lands and makes their way to the treasure. Cerberus decides to make for land and hide in their ship. Kip and the Captain go for the treasure, but on the surface Medley tells the crew that the treasure is import numbers and they become angry, tie her up to a rock and return to the ship. Kip then realised that they started from the wrong spot and are in a trap, but escape. The crew on the Black Dog threaten to mutiny but Cerberus kills them. Kip, Medley and the Captain go to the correct cave and find the real treasure, which contains a big red button. However, it will not work without the correct code. When they return to the ship, they find the crew have been killed by Cerberus. Cerberus pushed the Captain overboard, but before he can kill the others, the navy arrive to arrest them all. The navy transfer Medley and Kip to prison, and so they jump into a prison world.
3	"Doing Time"	Jeremy Mortimer	Nick Perry	13 February 2011
In the prison world "Jail Break: The Game of Prison Brutality", Kip is one of the inmates and Medley is a warden. Kip's objective is to escape from the prison. Medley learns that the prisoners are all rogues, that normally rogues are not officers, and that the prison is watched by corporate security, so Medley is working for Planet B. His cellmate demands that Kip bribes Medley to get a gate key so that he can see you. However, Medley steps in and gets him away. Medley reveals that Jail Break has been turned into a central containment unit for rogues and sympathisers. Kip learns that only person with the key is the chief warden, Ma'am, and that it is password protected. Kip later discovers that the prison is in a time loop: the rogues lives are repeated every day, and that their memories of the prisoners and wardens is being wiped every day. Kip's cellmate, Slab, discovers the memory wiping. However, the time loop is sucking in Medley, brainwashing her, and she puts Kip in solitary confinement. However, the loop resets and he gets out. Kip then discovers something: all the prisoners are male and all the wardens are women, so everyone in the prison is a rogue except Kip. Kip tells Slab the way to break up the world is calm the prisoners down and get rid of the violence. The prisoners hold a birthday party of the chief warden, find out the correct date and Kip gets the key. However, at the gate Kip meets the brainwashed Medley. Kip uses a coin from the Pirate Islands to remind her of Lioba and they free everyone in the prison. Medley claims that Lioba cannot come back as they jump to the next world.
4	"Disaster!"	Colin Guthrie	Matthew Wilkie	20 February 2011
Kip and Medley have jumped into a party being held before Planet B shuts down, where they meet some old school friends that Kip knew. They learn that Planet B is due to be closed down in two hours. Medley wants to leave but Kip decides to stay. With Lioba gone, Kip decides to go to Planet B, but Medley wants him to stay so that she can save the rogues. During the middle of the party there is an earthquake. A policeman, Sgt. O'Hara elsewhere in the site goes to a rookie cop who needs help, the rookie in question being Cerberus. Kip realises that they are in "Disaster Scape", a world where you can be the hero of your own disaster movie. Kip saves the life of one friend, Lester, who is responsible for a large amount of Britain's financial services. However, one of the other guests, Camille, turns out to be a hacker trying to be trying to getting Lester's money, having already killing him in the real-life. Camille's voice unit then breaks down and it turns that Camille is actually a man called Keith from Bracknell. Kip tries to find a water tank to put out the fire caused by the earthquake, meeting Sgt. O'Hara on the way. They are followed by Cerberus. Lester gives Camille/Keith the password and takes him with her/him, leaving everyone else in the building to die. Medley escapes the party when the other party guests, becoming rogues, cause a distraction. Medley, equipped with weapons, battles Cerberus. She shoots at a water tank, which falls on top of Cerberus and puts the fire out. Medley launches a rocket launcher and shoots down the helicopter Keith was planning to escape on, so Keith unleashes a final trap - a lizard-like Godzilla monster. However, before it attacks, the site shuts down and Planet B announces that it will shut down in one minute. Kip remembers the code, St. Lioba's Day, but it is too late - Planet B has shut down.
5	"The End of the Rogue"	James Robinson	Matthew Broughton	27 February 2011
With Planet B shut down, Cerberus and several minions are left alone to kill anyone he fancies who is still left. Kip and Medley are left on their own in a ruined wilderness. However, broadcasts from the real world are leaking. They can hear broadcasts from John saying that the rogues will face a slow death in two hours, and says to Medley to go west. Cerberus learns from Planet B that he is not allowed to transfer to Platinum. As Planet B is slowly destroyed, Kip and Medley are rescued by Slag, but it turns out to be a trap. They are trapped in a cell with Deano, who was supposedly killed in the Black Forest. The rogues are eating other rogues to gain energy. Slag helps them escape and they go west. As they travel, they see more dead rogues. Medley mourns their deaths, but then Cerberus arrives. His minions attack but then Cerberus orders them to stop and kills them. Cerberus tells Medley that he can't jump to Platinum because he never had a real body. He thought he was an actual person it turns out that he had false memories implanted into his head. Medley tells him he is a rogue, but Cerberus run away. Medley tells Medley that the two worked together once. Then a ship falls from the sky, The Mermaid's Revenge, with Captain Mary on board, and tells them that the place to go to is Mount Lioba. The five travel to the summit and find the reset button. Kip enters the code, but is attacked by Mark Schwartz, who kills Captain Mary and Slab. Deano calls in an air attack but Schwartz brings it down easily and kills Deano. Schwartz then slices Kip's legs, but then Cerberus arrives and attacks him with his corporate claws. Kip reaches the reset button and button is pressed. The world resets to make a country field.
