= List of Stuff You Should Know episodes (2018) =

This is a list of episodes from 2018 for the Stuff You Should Know podcast.

== 2018 season ==
No. in series	No. in season	Title	Length	Original air date
1021	1	"How Orchids Work"	56 minutes	January 2, 2018
1022	2	"How Impeachment Works"	57 minutes	January 4, 2018
1023	3	"The Mystery of the Mary Celeste"	67 minutes	January 9, 2018
1024	4	"What is an invasive species?"	56 minutes	January 11, 2018
1025	5	"How Removing Public Monuments Work"	52 minutes	January 16, 2018
1026	6	"How Hang Gliding Works"	47 minutes	January 18, 2018
1027	7	"How Hoarding Works"	67 minutes	January 23, 2018
1028	8	"The Manson Family Murders Part I"	51 minutes	January 25, 2018
1029	9	"The Manson Family Murders Part II"	46 minutes	January 30, 2018
1030	10	"Marijuana Vs. Alcohol: Which Is Worse For You?"	57 minutes	February 1, 2018
1031	11	"What is a Mold-A-Rama?"	44 minutes	February 6, 2018
1032	12	"The Mystery of The Grand Canyon Newlyweds"	57 minutes	February 8, 2018
1033	13	"How Pompeii Worked"	55 minutes	February 13, 2018
1034	14	"The Harriet Tubman Story"	52 minutes	February 15, 2018
1035	15	"Are Feral Children Real?"	47 minutes	February 20, 2018
1036	16	"Rosa Parks: Agent of Change"	56 minutes	February 22, 2018
1037	17	"Knife Throwing: Super Cool"	47 minutes	February 27, 2018
1038	18	"SYSK Live: Back When Ford Pintos Were Flaming Deathtraps"	80 minutes	March 1, 2018
1039	19	"The Strange Story of Sea Monkeys"	57 minutes	March 6, 2018
1040	20	"Why Do People Believe In Faith Healing?"	58 minutes	March 8, 2018
1041	21	"The Huggable, Lovable Walrus"	55 minutes	March 13, 2018
1042	22	"Is Vaping Really Bad For You?"	46 minutes	March 15, 2018
1043	23	"How the New England Vampire Panics Worked"	52 minutes	March 20, 2018
1044	24	"How the Framingham Heart Study Works"	56 minutes	March 22, 2018
1045	25	"How Meals on Wheels Works"	53 minutes	March 27, 2018
1046	26	"What are false positives?"	49 minutes	March 29, 2018
1047	27	"When Words Take on New Meanings"	62 minutes	April 3, 2018
1048	28	"Project Azorian: The CIA's Super 70s Mission To Steal A Sunken Soviet Sub"	56 minutes	April 5, 2018
1049	29	"Why Landmines Are The Deadliest Legacy Of War"	56 minutes	April 10, 2018
1050	30	"How Paramedics Work"	53 minutes	April 12, 2018
1051	31	"The Unabomber: Misguided to say the least"	51 minutes	April 17, 2018
1052	32	"Two Times In the 70s When People Buried Ferraris"	51 minutes	April 19, 2018
1053	33	"Emojis: A New Language? Nah."	53 minutes	April 24, 2018
1054	34	"Does Pyromania Actually Exist?"	40 minutes	April 26, 2018
1055	35	"Nepotism: When Hiring the Best Just Won't Do"	47 minutes	May 1, 2018
1056	36	"North Korea: What's the Deal?"	72 minutes	May 3, 2018
1057	37	"PT Barnum: More Complicated Than You've Heard"	63 minutes	May 8, 2018
1058	38	"How Drowning Works"	56 minutes	May 10, 2018
1059	39	"What's a quinceañera anyway?"	45 minutes	May 15, 2018
1060	40	"The Collar Bomb Heist"	47 minutes	May 17, 2018
1061	41	"A List Of Games You Would Surely Lose to a Computer"	61 minutes	May 22, 2018
1062	42	"How Occam's Razor Works"	46 minutes	May 24, 2018
1063	43	"How Drug Courts Work"	57 minutes	May 29, 2018
1064	44	"Is the Pied Piper About a Real Historic Tragedy?"	46 minutes	May 31, 2018
1065	45	"The Max Headroom Incident"	54 minutes	June 5, 2018
1066	46	"Frida Kahlo: Painter, Icon, Genius"	52 minutes	June 7, 2018
1067	47	"How Tsunamis Work"	52 minutes	June 12, 2018
1068	48	"Skyscrapers: 'Scuse me while I kiss the sky"	57 minutes	June 14, 2018
1069	49	"How The Pill Changed the World"	50 minutes	June 19, 2018
1070	50	"Genghis Khan: Madman or Genius?"	55 minutes	June 21, 2018
1071	51	"Can Anarchism Work?"	66 minutes	June 26, 2018
1072	52	"Narwhals: Unicorns of the Sea"	41 minutes	June 28, 2018
1073	53	"How Diabetes Works"	60 minutes	July 3, 2018
1074	54	"How the Stanford Prison Experiment Worked"	51 minutes	July 5, 2018
1075	55	"The Disappearance of the Yuba County Five"	57 minutes	July 10, 2018
1076	56	"Gerrymandering: How to Stifle Democracy"	42 minutes	July 12, 2018
1077	57	"Jobs of Bygone Eras"	65 minutes	July 17, 2018
1078	58	"How Attorney-Client Privilege Works"	42 minutes	July 19, 2018
1079	59	"Recycling Update: How’s It Going?"	69 minutes	July 24, 2018
1080	60	"The Dyatlov Pass Mystery"	45 minutes	July 26, 2018
1081	61	"How the Pony Express Worked"	49 minutes	July 31, 2018
1082	62	"How the U.S. Military Draft Works"	60 minutes	August 2, 2018
1083	63	"How Search and Rescue Works"	65 minutes	August 7, 2018
1084	64	"How Attila the Hun Worked"	48 minutes	August 9, 2018
1085	65	"How Board Breaking Works"	50 minutes	August 14, 2018
1086	66	"Who is The Man of the Hole?"	42 minutes	August 16, 2018
1087	67	"Ballpoint pens? Heck yes, ballpoint pens!"	54 minutes	August 21, 2018
1088	68	"Pterosaurs: Not Flying Dinosaurs"	43 minutes	August 23, 2018
1089	69	"Why There Aren't So Many Hotel Fires Anymore"	49 minutes	August 28, 2018
1090	70	"How Elimination Diets Work"	49 minutes	August 30, 2018
1091	71	"How Police Lineups Work"	57 minutes	September 4, 2018
1092	72	"The Lava Lamp: Goes Great With Acid"	51 minutes	September 6, 2018
1093	73	"SYSK Live: How Game Shows Work"	73 minutes	September 11, 2018
1094	74	"What are think tanks all about?"	50 minutes	September 13, 2018
1095	75	"Roundabouts: The Problem Is You"	63 minutes	September 18, 2018
1096	76	"How Ranked Choice Voting Works"	48 minutes	September 20, 2018
1097	77	"What is colorblindness?"	41 minutes	September 25, 2018
1098	78	"Seriously, What Is Dark Matter?"	48 minutes	September 27, 2018
1099	79	"How the Concorde Worked"	61 minutes	October 2, 2018
1100	80	"Algae: Food, Fuel, What?"	57 minutes	October 4, 2018
1101	81	"How Marathons Work"	70 minutes	October 9, 2018
1102	82	"When inventions kill!"	49 minutes	October 11, 2018
1103	83	"Was There A Real Robin Hood?"	54 minutes	October 16, 2018
1104	84	"Waterbeds: The Sexiest Bed?"	44 minutes	October 18, 2018
1105	85	"How Epilepsy Works"	59 minutes	October 23, 2018
1106	86	"How the Amityville Horror Worked"	58 minutes	October 25, 2018
1107	87	"SYSK’s 2018 Super Spooktacular"	51 minutes	October 30, 2018
1108	88	"How Easy Bake Ovens Work"	41 minutes	November 1, 2018
1109	89	"What were war masks?"	44 minutes	November 6, 2018
1110	90	"Is yogurt a miracle food?"	51 minutes	November 8, 2018
1111	91	"Pando: Earth’s Oldest, Hugest Organism Is Trees!"	48 minutes	November 13, 2018
1112	92	"Olive Oil: Mother Nature's Gift"	66 minutes	November 15, 2018
1113	93	"Finders Keepers: Real Law"	44 minutes	November 20, 2018
1114	94	"Fire twucks! Fire twucks! (sic)"	54 minutes	November 22, 2018
1115	95	"How the Navajo Code Talkers Worked"	50 minutes	November 27, 2018
1116	96	"Adidas v. Puma: A Sibling Rivalry"	46 minutes	November 29, 2018
1117	97	"How Search and Rescue Dogs Work"	56 minutes	December 4, 2018
1118	98	"Was the PMRC censorship in disguise?"	60 minutes	December 6, 2018
1119	99	"How Ayahuasca Works"	50 minutes	December 11, 2018
1120	100	"Are good samaritan laws effective?"	51 minutes	December 13, 2018
1121	101	"Geodesic Domes: The Wave of the Future That Wasn't"	55 minutes	December 18, 2018
1122	102	"E.T.: Is It Really the Worst Video Game of All Time?"	47 minutes	December 20, 2018
1123	103	"SYSK Live Christmas Spectacular!"	75 minutes	December 25, 2018
1124	104	"Dr. Seuss: The Good, the Bad and the Ugly"	56 minutes	December 27, 2018

=== Short Stuff (2018) ===
No. in series	No. in season	Title	Length	Original air date
1	1	"Short Stuff: Grandfather Clocks"	15 minutes	October 3, 2018
2	2	"Short Stuff: William King"	15 minutes	October 10, 2018
3	3	"Short Stuff: Korean Fan Death"	17 minutes	October 17, 2018
4	4	"Short Stuff: Exploding Manholes"	16 minutes	October 24, 2018
5	5	"Short Stuff: Labor Day"	15 minutes	October 31, 2018
6	6	"Short Stuff: Vomitoria"	15 minutes	November 7, 2018
7	7	"Short Stuff: Lemonade"	16 minutes	November 14, 2018
8	8	"Short Stuff: Safety Pins"	15 minutes	November 21, 2018
9	9	"Short Stuff: iSmell"	16 minutes	November 28, 2018
10	10	"Short Stuff: Dolphin Detectors"	16 minutes	December 5, 2018
11	11	"Short Stuff: Laughing Buddha"	14 minutes	December 12, 2018
12	12	"Short Stuff: Unique Snowflakes"	14 minutes	December 19, 2018
13	13	"Short Stuff: The Brain-Bladder Connection"	16 minutes	December 26, 2018
