= List of Stuff You Should Know episodes (2013) =

This is a list of episodes from 2013 for the Stuff You Should Know podcast

== 2013 season ==
No. in series	No. in season	Title	Length	Original air date
490	1	"How Bigfoot Works"	35 minutes	January 1, 2013
491	2	"What was America’s first terrorist threat?"	27 minutes	January 3, 2013
492	3	"Can you outrun an alligator in a zig-zag?"	25 minutes	January 8, 2013
493	4	"Why do men have nipples?"	23 minutes	January 10, 2013
494	5	"How Death Masks Work"	31 minutes	January 15, 2013
495	6	"Does the five-second rule work?"	33 minutes	January 17, 2013
496	7	"How Alien Hand Syndrome Works"	15 minutes	January 19, 2013
497	8	"How the Frick Fracking Works"	45 minutes	January 22, 2013
498	9	"Fecal Transplants: You Gonna Drink That Poop?"	32 minutes	January 24, 2013
499	10	"How Bees Work"	43 minutes	January 27, 2013
500	11	"How Stuntmen (and -women) Work"	39 minutes	January 29, 2013
501	12	"How Gold Works"	45 minutes	February 1, 2013
502	13	"How Garbage-powered Cars Could Work"	25 minutes	February 5, 2013
503	14	"How Willpower Works"	31 minutes	February 8, 2013
504	15	"How Weather Modification Works"	32 minutes	February 9, 2013
505	16	"How Jet Lag Works"	34 minutes	February 12, 2013
506	17	"Myths About the Brain"	24 minutes	February 14, 2013
507	18	"How Surfing Works"	49 minutes	February 19, 2013
508	19	"What Would Happen If the World Stopped Spinning?"	20 minutes	February 21, 2013
509	20	"How CPR Works"	29 minutes	February 26, 2013
510	21	"How the Papacy Works"	34 minutes	March 1, 2013
511	22	"What Makes a One-hit Wonder?"	29 minutes	March 5, 2013
512	23	"Do People Really Run Off to Join the French Foreign Legion?"	21 minutes	March 7, 2013
513	24	"Can We Build an Elevator to Space?"	30 minutes	March 9, 2013
514	25	"How Police Sketches Work"	39 minutes	March 12, 2013
515	26	"How the U.S. Postal Service Works"	45 minutes	March 13, 2013
516	27	"How Apartheid Worked"	37 minutes	March 18, 2013
517	28	"Gesundheit! How Allergies Work"	27 minutes	March 21, 2013
518	29	"What was the most peaceful time in history?"	28 minutes	March 26, 2013
519	30	"How No-fly Zones Work"	27 minutes	March 28, 2013
520	31	"How the Panama Canal Works"	33 minutes	April 1, 2013
521	32	"How Grief Works"	42 minutes	April 1, 2013
522	33	"What’s the deal with duckbill platypuses?"	25 minutes	April 9, 2013
523	34	"Do men and women have different brains?"	26 minutes	April 11, 2013
524	35	"How Marriage Works"	41 minutes	April 16, 2013
525	36	"Uses of the Insanity Defense"	31 minutes	April 18, 2013
526	37	"How Magnets Work"	36 minutes	April 23, 2013
527	38	"What makes us yawn?"	29 minutes	April 25, 2013
528	39	"Is there such a thing as a truth serum?"	37 minutes	April 30, 2013
529	40	"How Dungeons and Dragons Works"	48 minutes	May 2, 2013
530	41	"How Fair Trade Works"	30 minutes	May 7, 2013
531	42	"How Foot Binding Worked"	28 minutes	May 9, 2013
532	43	"How Electroconvulsive Therapy Works"	26 minutes	May 14, 2013
533	44	"How Aerosol Cans Work"	24 minutes	May 16, 2013
534	45	"How Cicadas Work"	30 minutes	May 21, 2013
535	46	"How PTSD Works"	40 minutes	May 23, 2013
536	47	"How Police Chases Work"	27 minutes	May 28, 2013
537	48	"How Coffins Work"	41 minutes	May 30, 2013
538	49	"What happened to the lost colony at Roanoke?"	34 minutes	June 4, 2013
539	50	"How do trees affect the weather?"	28 minutes	June 6, 2013
540	51	"How Drag Queens Work"	43 minutes	June 11, 2013
541	52	"Capgras Syndrome: You Are Not Who You Think You Are"	26 minutes	June 13, 2013
542	53	"How Bitcoin Works"	37 minutes	June 18, 2013
543	54	"How Ghosts Work"	43 minutes	June 20, 2013
544	55	"What’s the deal with Rasputin’s death?"	32 minutes	June 25, 2013
545	56	"How Burning Man Works"	33 minutes	June 27, 2013
546	57	"How Pollen Works"	29 minutes	July 2, 2013
547	58	"How Miranda Rights Work"	30 minutes	July 5, 2013
548	59	"10 Medieval Torture Devices"	36 minutes	July 9, 2013
549	60	"How Hip-hop Works"	52 minutes	July 11, 2013
550	61	"How Building Implosions Work"	36 minutes	July 16, 2013
551	62	"Who owns an abandoned house?"	31 minutes	July 18, 2013
552	63	"Why should you never scare a vulture?"	32 minutes	July 23, 2013
553	64	"How Maps Work"	41 minutes	July 25, 2013
554	65	"How LARP Works"	35 minutes	July 30, 2013
555	66	"How Fingerprinting Works"	35 minutes	August 1, 2013
556	67	"How Horseshoes Work"	31 minutes	August 6, 2013
557	68	"The Shark Diaries"	40 minutes	August 7, 2013
558	69	"How does a diving bell work?"	31 minutes	August 8, 2013
559	70	"Why was Davy Crockett king of the wild frontier?"	37 minutes	August 13, 2013
560	71	"How Cockroaches Work"	44 minutes	August 15, 2013
561	72	"How Ejection Seats Work"	39 minutes	August 20, 2013
562	73	"History’s Greatest Traitors"	45 minutes	August 22, 2013
563	74	"How Broken Bones Work"	43 minutes	August 27, 2013
564	75	"How did 168 conquistadors take down the Inca empire?"	40 minutes	August 29, 2013
565	76	"How the Rosetta Stone Works"	38 minutes	September 3, 2013
566	77	"How much money is in the world?"	36 minutes	September 5, 2013
567	78	"How Breast Implants Work"	60 minutes	September 10, 2013
568	79	"Can you die of a broken heart?"	29 minutes	September 12, 2013
569	80	"How IEDs Work"	35 minutes	September 17, 2013
570	81	"How Dying Works"	64 minutes	September 19, 2013
571	82	"How Crack Works"	49 minutes	September 24, 2013
572	83	"Does owning a gun change your behavior?"	33 minutes	September 26, 2013
573	84	"What’s the deal with diplomatic immunity?"	41 minutes	September 30, 2013
574	85	"Can NASA predict natural disasters?"	28 minutes	October 3, 2013
575	86	"Did Archimedes build a death ray?"	36 minutes	October 8, 2013
576	87	"How Handwriting Analysis Works"	43 minutes	October 10, 2013
577	88	"How the Maori Work"	40 minutes	October 14, 2013
578	89	"10 Easy Ways to Save Money"	45 minutes	October 17, 2013
579	90	"How Guide Dogs Work"	40 minutes	October 21, 2013
580	91	"How Revisionist History Works"	45 minutes	October 24, 2013
581	92	"How Ouija Boards Work"	34 minutes	October 29, 2013
582	93	"The Empty House"	40 minutes	October 30, 2013
583	94	"What’s with the Winchester Mystery House?"	34 minutes	October 31, 2013
584	95	"How Chess Works"	49 minutes	November 5, 2013
585	96	"How Lewis and Clark Worked"	55 minutes	November 7, 2013
586	97	"Some Interesting Things You Didn’t Know About Stephen Hawking"	33 minutes	November 12, 2013
587	98	"How Werewolves Work"	35 minutes	November 14, 2013
588	99	"How Chocolate Works"	41 minutes	November 19, 2013
589	100	"Who killed JFK?"	47 minutes	November 21, 2013
590	101	"Is there a scientific formula for funny?"	43 minutes	November 25, 2013
591	102	"How Black Friday Works"	40 minutes	November 27, 2013
592	103	"How Castration Works"	42 minutes	December 3, 2013
593	104	"How Maglev Trains Work"	33 minutes	December 5, 2013
594	105	"How HeLa Cells Work"	27 minutes	December 10, 2013
595	106	"How Underwater Tunnels Work"	34 minutes	December 11, 2013
596	107	"How Manhunts Work"	35 minutes	December 16, 2013
597	108	"Is lethal injection humane?"	45 minutes	December 19, 2013
598	109	"Josh and Chuck’s Warm and Cozy Christmas Extravaganza 2013"	45 minutes	December 24, 2013
599	110	"How Fire Breathing Works"	32 minutes	December 26, 2013
600	111	"Will solar sails take us to the stars?"	25 minutes	December 30, 2013
