= List of 2017 This American Life episodes =

In 2017, there were 28 new This American Life episodes.

- Episode 607 – "Didn’t We Solve This One?"
  - air date: 2017-01-06
- Episode 608 – "The Revolution Starts At Noon"
  - air date: 2017-01-20
- Episode 609 – "It’s Working Out Very Nicely"
  - air date: 2017-02-03
- Episode 610 – "Grand Gesture"
  - air date: 2017-02-17
- Episode 611 – "Vague and Confused"
  - air date: 2017-03-03
- Episode 612 – "Ask a Grown-Up"
  - air date: 2017-03-17
- Episode 613 – "OK, I’ll Do It"
  - air date: 2017-03-31
- Episode 614 – "The Other Mr. President"
  - air date: 2017-04-14
- Episode 615 – "The Beginning of Now"
  - air date: 2017-04-28
- Episode 616 – "I Am Not A Pirate"
  - air date: 2017-05-05
- Episode 617 – "Fermi’s Paradox"
  - air date: 2017-05-19
- Episode 618 – "Mr. Lie Detector"
  - air date: 2017-06-09
- Episode 619 – "The Magic Show"
  - air date: 2017-06-30
- Episode 620 – "To Be Real"
  - air date: 2017-07-14
- Episode 621 – "Fear and Loathing in Homer and Rockville"
  - air date: 2017-07-21
- Episode 622 – "Who You Gonna Call?"
  - air date: 2017-08-04
- Episode 623 – "We Are in the Future"
  - air date: 2017-08-18
- Episode 624 – "Private Geography"
  - air date: 2017-09-01
- Episode 625 – "Essay B"
  - air date: 2017-09-08
- Episode 626 – "White Haze"
  - air date: 2017-09-22
- Episode 627 – "Suitable for Children"
  - air date: 2017-10.06
- Episode 628 – "In the Shadow of the City 2017"
  - air date: 2017-10-13
- Episode 629 – "Expect Delays"
  - air date: 2017-10-20
- Episode 630 – "Things I Mean to Know"
  - air date: 2017-10-27
- Episode 631 – "So a Monkey and a Horse Walk Into a Bar"
  - air date: 2017-11-10
- Episode 632 – "Our Town"
  - air date: 2017-12-08
- Episode 633 – "Our Town - Part Two"
  - air date: 2017-12-15
- Episode 634 – "Human Error in Volatile Situations"
  - air date: 2017–12-22
