= List of 2020 This American Life episodes =

In 2020, there were thirty-eight new This American Life episodes.

- Episode 691 – "Gardens of Branching Paths"

Air Date: 2020-01-10

- Episode 692 – "The Show of Delights "

Air Date: 2020-01-31

- Episode 693 – "Abdi the American "

Air Date: 2020-02-07

- Episode 694 – "Get Back to Where You Once Belonged"

Air Date: 2020-02-14

- Episode 695 – "Everyone's a Critic"

Air Date: 2020-02-28

- Episode 696 – "Low Hum of Menace"

Air Date: 2020-03-13

- Episode 697 – "Alone Together"

Air Date: 2020-03-20

- Episode 698 – "The Test"

Air Date: 2020-03-27

- Episode 699 – "Fiasco!"

Air Date: 2020-04-03

- Episode 700 – "Filling in the Gaps"

Air Date: 2020-04-10

- Episode 701 – "Black Box"

Air Date: 2020-04-17

- Episode 702 – "One Last Thing Before I Go"

Air Date: 2020-04-24

- Episode 703 – "Stuck!"

Air Date: 2020-05-08

- Episode 704 – "Our Pulitzer-Winning Episode"

Air Date: 2020-05-15

- Episode 705 – "Time Out"

Air Date: 2020-05-22

- Episode 706 – "A Mess to Be Reckoned With"

Air Date: 2020-05-29

- Episode 707 – "We Are in the Future"

Air Date: 2020-06-05

- Episode 708 – "Here, Again"

Air Date: 2020-06-12

- Episode 709 – "The Reprieve"

Air Date: 2020-06-26

- Episode 710 – "Umbrellas Down"

Air Date: 2020-07-10

- Episode 711 – "How to Be Alone"

Air Date: 2020-07-17

- Episode 712 – "Nice White Parents"

Air Date: 2020-07-31

- Episode 713 – "Made to Be Broken"

Air Date: 2020-08-07

- Episode 714 – "Day at the Beach"

Air Date: 2020-08-14

- Episode 715 – "Long-Awaited Asteroid Finally Hits Earth"

Air Date: 2020-08-28

- Episode 716 – "Trail of Tears"

Air Date: 2020-09-04

- Episode 717 – "Audience of One"

Air Date: 2020-09-11

- Episode 718 – "Same Bed, Different Dreams"

Air Date: 2020-09-25, an update of episode Episode 556 – "Same Bed, Different Dreams"

- Episode 719 – "Trust Me I’m a Doctor"

Air Date: 2020-10-02

- Episode 720 – "The Moment After This Moment"

Air Date: 2020-10-16

- Episode 721 – "The Walls Close In"

Air Date: 2020-10-23

- Episode 722 – "The Unreality of Now"

Air Date: 2020-10-30

- Episode 723 – "Squeaker"

Air Date: 2020-11-06

- Episode 724 – "Personal Recount"

Air Date: 2020-11-13

- Episode 725 – "Turkey in a Face Mask"

Air Date: 2020-11-27

- Episode 726 – "Twenty-Five"

Air Date: 2020-12-11

- Episode 727 – "Boulder v. Hill"

Air Date: 2020-12-18

- Episode 728 – "Lights, Camera, Christmas!"

Air Date: 2020-12-25
