= List of 2000 This American Life episodes =

In 2000, there were 26 This American Life episodes.

- Episode 149 – "Bedside Diplomacy"
- Episode 150 – "Kids as Adults"
- Episode 151 – "Primary"
- Episode 152 – "Crush"
- Episode 153 – "Dolls"
- Episode 154 – "In Dog We Trust"
- Episode 155 – "Hoaxing Yourself"
- Episode 156 – "What Remains"
- Episode 157 – "Secret Life of Daytime"
- Episode 158 – "Mob Mentality"
- Episode 159 – "Mother's Day"
- Episode 160 – "Character Assassination"
- Episode 161 – "Million Bubbles"
- Episode 162 – "Moving"
- Episode 163 – "Can You Fight City Hall... If You Are City Hall?"
- Episode 164 – "Crime Scene"
- Episode 165 – "Americans in Paris"
- Episode 166 – "Nobody's Family is Going to Change"
  - Act 1: So a Jew, a Christian, and a Recording Crew Walk into This Bar
  - Act 2: Matching Outfits Not Included
  - Act 3: The Artist Formerly Known as Dr. Sarkin
- Episode 167 – "Memo to the People of the Future"
- Episode 168 – "The Fix Is In"
- Episode 169 – "Pursuit of Happiness"
- Episode 170 – "Immigration"
- Episode 171 – "Election"
- Episode 172 – "24 Hours at the Golden Apple"
  - The TAL production staff interviewed patrons at the Golden Apple Diner in Chicago during one 24-hour period. This episode consists of vignettes of these interviews connected by Ira Glass's narration. If you are in Chicago, Ira recommends the diner's feta cheese omelette.
- Episode 173 – "Three Kinds of Deception"
  - Act 1: Self-Deception
  - Act 2: Deceiving Others
  - Act 3: Accidental Deception – David Sedaris performs a version of his story "Picka Pocketoni," from his collection Me Talk Pretty One Day
- Episode 174 – "Birthdays, Anniversaries and Milestones"
