= List of 2018 This American Life episodes =

In 2018, there were 30 new This American Life episodes.

- Episode 635 – "Chip in My Brain"

Air Date: 2018-01-12

- Episode 636 – "I Thought It Would Be Easier"

Air Date: 2018-01-19

- Episode 637 – "Words You Can't Say"

Air Date: 2018-02-02

- Episode 638 – "Rom-Com"

Air Date: 2018-02-09

- Episode 639 – "In Dog We Trust"

Air Date: 2018-02-23

- Episode 640 – "Five Women"

Air Date: 2018-03-02

- Episode 641 – "The Walls"

Air Date: 2018-03-02

- Episode 642 – "The Impossible Dream"

Air Date: 2018-04-06

- Episode 643 – "Damned If You Do..."

Air Date: 2018-04-13

- Episode 644 – "Random Acts of History"

Air Date: 2018-04-27

- Episode 645 – "My Effing First Amendment"

Air Date: 2018-05-04

- Episode 646 – "The Secret of My Death"

Air Date: 2018-05-18

- Episode 647 – "LaDonna"

Air Date: 2018-05-25

- Episode 648 – "Unteachable Moment"

Air Date: 2018-06-08

- Episode 649 – "It's My Party and I'll Try If I Want To"

Air Date: 2018-06-22

- Episode 650 – "Change You Can Maybe Believe In"

Air Date: 2018-06-22

- Episode 651 – "If You Build It, Will They Come?"

Air Date: 2018-07-13

- Episode 652 – "ICE Capades"

Air Date: 2018-07-20

- Episode 653 – "Crime Scene"

Air Date: 2018-08-03

- Episode 654 – "The Feather Heist"

Air Date: 2018-08-10

- Episode 655 – "The Not-So-Great Unknown"

Air Date: 2018-08-24

- Episode 656 – "Let Me Count the Ways"

Air Date: 2018-09-14

- Episode 657 – "The Runaways"

Air Date: 2018-09-21

- Episode 658 – "The Unhappy Deciders"

Air Date: 2018-10-05

- Episode 659 – "Before the Next One"

Air Date: 2018-10-12

- Episode 660 – "Hoaxing Yourself"

Air Date: 2018-11-02

- Episode 661 – "But That's What Happened"

Air Date: 2018-11-09

- Episode 662 – "Where There Is a Will"

Air Date: 2018-11-16

- Episode 663 – "How I Read It"

Air Date: 2018-12-07

- Episode 664 – "The Room of Requirement"

Air Date: 2018-12-28
