= List of 2010 This American Life episodes =

In 2010, there were 26 new This American Life episodes.

- Episode 397 – "2010"
- Episode 398 – "Long Shot"
- Episode 399 – "Contents Unknown"
- Episode 400 – "Stories Pitched by Our Parents"
- Episode 401 – "Parent Trap"
- Episode 402 – "Save The Day"
- Episode 403 – "NUMMI"
- Episode 404 – "Enemy Camp 2010"
- Episode 405 – "Inside Job"
- Episode 406 – "True Urban Legends"
- Episode 407 – "The Bridge"
- Episode 408 – "Island Time"
- Episode 409 – "Held Hostage"
- Episode 410 – "Social Contract"
- Episode 411 – "First Contact"
- Episode 412 – "Million Dollar Idea"
- Episode 413 – "Georgia Rambler"
- Episode 414 – "Right to Remain Silent"
- Episode 415 – "Crybabies"
- Episode 416 – "Iraq After Us"
- Episode 417 – "This Party Sucks"
- Episode 418 – "Toxie"
- Episode 419 – "Petty Tyrant"
- Episode 420 – "Neighborhood Watch"
- Episode 421 – "Last Man Standing"
- Episode 422 – "Comedians of Christmas Comedy Special"
