= List of 2013 This American Life episodes =

In 2013, there were 32 new This American Life episodes.

- Episode 483 – "Self-Improvement Kick"
  - Act 1: Is That a Compass, a Map, a Toothbrush, and a Bottle of Purell in Your Pocket, or Are You Just Happy to See Me?
  - Act 2: Some Like It Dot
- Episode 484 – " Doppelgangers"
  - Act 1: Dead Ringer
  - Act 2: In Country, in City
- Episode 485 – "Surrogates"
  - Act 1: Petticoats in a Twist
  - Act 2: Maul in the Family
- Episode 486 – "Valentine's Day"
  - Act 1: Best Laid Plans
  - Act 2: 21 Chump Street
  - Act 3: Cold Stone Dreamery
  - Act 4: My Girlfriend's Boyfriend
- Episode 487 – "Harper High School, Part One"
  - Act 1: Rules to Live By
  - Act 2: A Tiny Office on the Second Floor
  - Act 3: Game Day
- Episode 488 – "Harper High School, Part Two"
  - Act 1: The Eyewitness
  - Act 2: Your Name Written on Me
  - Act 3: Get Your Own Gun
  - Act 4: Devonte, Part Two
  - Act 5: Reverse Turnaround Backflip
- Episode 489 – "No Coincidence, No Story!"
  - Act 1: Grandmas
  - Act 2: In God We Trust
  - Act 3: Brother, Can You Spare a Dime?
  - Act 4: Act Four
  - Act 5: What Are the Chances?
- Episode 490 – "Trends with Benefits"
  - Act 1: Act One
  - Act 2: Act Two
- Episode 491 – "Tribes"
  - Act 1: I Know I Am But What Are You?
  - Act 2: A Tribe Called Rest
  - Act 3: I Am Curious Yellow
- Episode 492 – "Dr. Gilmer and Mr. Hyde"
  - Act 1: Act One
  - Act 2: Act Two
- Episode 493 – "Picture Show"
  - Act 1: Photo Op
  - Act 2: A Picture Is Worth a Thousand... Dollars
- Episode 494 – "Hit the Road"
  - Act 1: The Slowest Distance Between Two Points
  - Act 2: Car Pool
  - Act 3: Let's See How Fast This Baby Will Go
- Episode 495 – "Hot in My Backyard"
  - Act 1: The CO2 in CO
  - Act 2: The Right Man for the Job
  - Act 3: Find an Enemy
- Episode 496 – "When Patents Attack... Part Two!"
  - Act 1: 2011
  - Act 2: 2013
- Episode 497 – "This Week"
  - Act 1: Act One
  - Act 2: Act Two
  - Act 3: Act Three
  - Act 4: Act Four
  - Act 5: Act Five
  - Act 6: Act Six
  - Act 7: Act Seven
- Episode 498 – "The One Thing You're Not Supposed To Do"
  - Act 1: Breaking the Ice
  - Act 2: The Gun Thing You're Not Supposed to Do
  - Act 3: Out of the Woods
- Episode 499 – "Taking Names"
  - Act 1: Reluctant Sailor
  - Act 2: Emails from a Dead Man
- Episode 500 – "500!"
  - A special retrospective episode featuring the producers' favorite segments from the previous 499 episodes.
  - Act 1:
    - #107, "Trail of Tears"
    - #220, "Testosterone"
    - #296, "After the Flood"
    - #232, "The Real Story"
    - #266, "I'm From the Private Sector and I'm Here to Help"
    - #334, "Duty Calls"
    - #314, "It's Never Over"
  - Act 2:
    - #27, "The Cruelty of Children"
    - #188, "Kid Logic"
    - #94, "How To"
    - #241, "20 Acts in 60 Minutes"
- Episode 501 – "The View From In Here"
  - Act 1: Weeds of Discontent
  - Act 2: The Real Housewife of Ciudad Juarez
  - Act 3: Movin On Up
- Episode 502 – "This Call May Be Recorded... To Save Your Life"
  - Act 1: Act One
  - Act 2: Act Two
- Episode 503 – "I Was Just Trying To Help"
  - Act 1: Money for Nothing and Your Cows for Free
  - Act 2: Nipped in the Bud
- Episode 504 – "How I Got Into College"
  - Act 1: The Old College Try
  - Act 2: My Ames Is True
- Episode 505 – "Use Only As Directed"
  - Act 1: Act 1
  - Act 2: Act 2
- Episode 506 – "Secret Identity"
  - Act 1: You Can't Handle The Truth
  - Act 2: Tiger, Tiger, Burning Bright
  - Act 3: The Blonde Avenger
- Episode 507 – "Confessions"
  - Act 1: Kim Possible
  - Act 2: You Don't Say
- Episode 508 – "Superpowers 2013"
  - Act 1: Invisible Man Vs. Hawkman
  - Act 2: Wonder Woman
  - Act 3: The Green Team Of Boy Millionaires, Beppo The Amazing Supermonkey From Planet Krypton, And The Man From Sram
  - Act 4: Villain And Able
- Episode 509 – "It Says So Right Here"
  - Act 1: Doe-ppelgangers
  - Act 2: What Are You Doing For The Test Of Your Life?
  - Act 3: There's A Signed Line Between Love And Hate
- Episode 510 – "Fiasco! 2013"
  - Act 1: Opening Night
  - Act 2: What We Wanted To Do
  - Act 3: Squirrel Cop
  - Act 4: Fiascos As A Force For Good In The World
- Episode 511 – "The Seven Things You're Not Supposed To Talk About"
  - Act 1: Period
  - Act 2: Diet
  - Act 3: Health
  - Act 4: Sleep
  - Act 5: Dream
  - Act 6: Route Talk
- Episode 512 – "House Rules"
  - Act 1: Rental Gymnastics
  - Act 2: The Missionary
- Episode 513 – "129 Cars"
  - Act 1: Act 1
  - Act 2: Act 2
  - Act 3: Act 3
  - Act 4: Act 4
  - Act 5: Act 5
  - Act 6: Act 6
  - Act 7: Act 7
  - Act 8: Act 8
  - Act 9: Act 9
  - Act 10: Act 10
- Episode 514 – "Thought That Counts"
  - Act 1: Replacement Claus
  - Act 2: It's Your Junk In A Box
  - Act 3: Christmas Or Bust
