= List of 2019 This American Life episodes =

In 2019, there were 26 new This American Life episodes.

- Episode 665 – "Before Things Went to Hell"

Air Date: 2019-01-04

- Episode 666 – "The Theme That Shall Not Be Named"

Air Date: 2019-01-18

- Episode 667 – "Wartime Radio"

Air Date: 2019-02-01

- Episode 668 – "The Long Fuse"

Air Date: 2019-02-15

- Episode 669 – "Scrambling to Get Off the Ice"

Air Date: 2019-03-01

- Episode 670 – "Beware the Jabberwock"

Air Date: 2019-03-15

- Episode 671 – "Anything Can Be Anything"

Air Date: 2019-03-29

- Episode 672 – "No Fair!"

Air Date: 2019-04-05

- Episode 673 – "Left Behind"

Air Date: 2019-04-19

- Episode 674 – "Get a Spine!"

Air Date: 2019-05-10

- Episode 675 – "I’m on TV??"

Air Date: 2019-05-17

- Episode 676 – "Here’s Looking at You, Kid"

Air Date: 2019-05-31

- Episode 677 – "Seeing Yourself In the Wild"

Air Date: 2019-06-14

- Episode 678 – "The Wannabes"

Air Date: 2019-07-05

- Episode 679 – "Save the Girl"

Air Date: 2019-07-12

- Episode 680 – "The Weight of Words"

Air Date: 2019-07-26

- Episode 681 – "Escape from the Lab"

Air Date: 2019-08-16

- Episode 682 – "Ten Sessions"

Air Date: 2019-08-23

- Episode 683 – "Beer Summit"

Air Date: 2019-09-20

- Episode 684 – "Burn It Down"

Air Date: 2019-09-27

- Episode 685 – "We Come from Small Places"

Air Date: 2019-10-11

- Extra: "Drums, Oil, and Early Morning Devil Horns"

Air Date: 2019-10-11

- Episode 686 – "Umbrellas Up"

Air Date: 2019-10-18

- Episode 687 – "Small Things Considered"

Air Date: 2019-11-08

- Episode 688 – "The Out Crowd"

Air Date: 2019-11-15

- Episode 689 – "Digging Up the Bones"

Air Date: 2019-12-06

- Episode 690 – "Too Close to Home"

Air Date: 2019-12-27
