= List of 1999 This American Life episodes =

In 1999, there were 30 new This American Life episodes.

- Episode 119 – "Lockup"
- Episode 120 – "Be Careful Who You Pretend to Be"
- Episode 121 – "Twentieth Century Man"
  - The story of Keith Aldridge, who repeatedly reinvented himself over the course of his life to coincide with the major cultural events of the late 20th century, until he died in 1993. Gillian Aldridge tells his story by interviewing her half-siblings.
- Episode 122 – "Valentine's Day '99"
- Episode 123 – "High Cost of Living"
- Episode 124 – "Welcome to America"
- Episode 125 – "Apocalypse"
- Episode 126 – "Do-Gooders"
- Episode 127 – "Pimp Anthropology"
- Episode 128 – "Four Corners"
- Episode 129 – "Advice"
- Episode 130 – "Away From Home"
- Episode 131 – "The Kids Are Alright"
- Episode 132 – "Father's Day '99"
- Episode 133 – "Sales"
- Episode 134 – "We Didn't"
- Episode 135 – "Allure of Crime"
  - Show description: Through our crimes, we express who we are.
  - Act 1: Your Good Girl's Gonna Go Bad – Ira Glass interviews Julia Sweeney.
  - Act 2: You'll Pay – Marilyn Snell reports on a former bank robber.
  - Act 3: Grandma Takes a Fall – Documentary filmmaker Jean Finley talks with an elderly shoplifter.
- Episode 136 – "You Are Here"
- Episode 137 – "The Book that Changed Your Life"
- Episode 138 – "The Real Thing"
- Episode 139 – "Ghosts of Elections Past"
- Episode 140 – "Family Business"
- Episode 141 – "Invisible Worlds"
- Episode 142 – "Barbara"
- Episode 143 – "Sentencing"
- Episode 144 – "Where Words Fail"
- Episode 145 – "Poultry Slam '99"
- Episode 146 – "Urban Nature"
- Episode 147 – "A Teenager's Guide to God"
- Episode 148 – "The Angels Wanna Wear My Red Suit"
