= List of 2006 This American Life episodes =

In 2006, there were 17 This American Life episodes.

- Episode 306 – "Seemed Like a Good Idea at the Time"
  - Act 1: Luck of the Irish – Ira Glass
  - Act 2: Taxation Without Inebriation
  - Act 3: Bad Morning America – Davy Rothbart
  - Act 4: Function of the Heart
- Episode 307 – "In the Shadow of the City"
  - Act 1: Brooklyn Archipelago – Brett Martin
  - Act 2: The Thin Gray Line – Cheryl Wagner
  - Act 3: Yes, In My Backyard – Jorge Just
- Episode 308 – "Star-Crossed Love"
  - Act 1: Prisoner of Love – Shant Kenderian
  - Act 2: The Diary of Mrs. Sam Horrigan – Catalina Puente
  - Act 3: So a Squirrel and a Chipmunk Walk Into a Bar – David Sedaris
- Episode 309 – "Cat and Mouse"
  - Act 1: El Gato Y El Ratoncito – James Spring
  - Act 2: Hello Kitty – David Sedaris
  - Act 3: Looking for Loveseats in all the Wrong Places – David Segal
  - Act 4: Spray My Name, Spray My Name – Brian Thomas Gallagher
- Episode 310 – "Habeas Schmaebeas"
  - Act 1: There's No U.S. in Habeas – Jack Hitt
  - Act 2: September 11, 1660 – Jon Ronson
  - Act 3: We Interrogate the Detainees – Jack Hitt
- Episode 311 – "A Better Mousetrap"
  - Act 1: Mother of Invention – Karen Sosnoski
  - Act 2: Everything Must Go – Sudhir Alladi Venkatesh
  - Act 3: What Would Fill-in-the-Blank Do? – Brett Martin
  - Act 4: Squashing the Creative Spirit – Andy Raskin
- Episode 312 – "How We Talked Back Then"
  - Show description: A return to two live shows from the TAL archive including show 36, "Letters" and show 66, "Tales from the Net".
  - Act 1: Letters
  - Act 2: Internet
- Episode 313 – "Parental Guidance Suggested"
  - Act 1: Two Possibilities, Both Bad – Ira Glass
  - Act 2: The Grandma Letters – Will Seymour, Mortified
  - Act 3: My Angel's in the Centerfolds – Thea Chaloner
- Episode 314 – "It's Never Over"
  - Act 1: Who Takes the Class Out of Class Reunion – Jon Ronson
  - Act 2: Life Without Leanne – Larry Doyle
  - Act 3: Deal of a Lifetime – Sarah Koenig (rebroadcast from episode 162)
  - Act 4: One Word: Timing – Tami Sagher
- Episode 315 – "The Parrot and the Potbellied Pig"
  - Act 1: Parrot – Ira Glass, Alex Lane, and Erik Holm
  - Act 2: Pig – Jonathan Goldstein
  - Act 3: Combo Platter – David Sedaris
- Episode 316 – "The Cat Came Back"
- Episode 317 – "Unconditional Love"
  - Act 1: Love Is A Battlefield – Alix Spiegel
  - Act 2: Hit Me With Your Best Shot – Dave Royko
- Episode 318 – "With Great Power"
  - Act 1: Objects in Side View Mirror Are Truer Than They Appear – Alex Kotlowitz
  - Act 2: Unwelcome Wagon – Ira Glass
  - Music interlude: Dave Barker, I Got to Get Away
  - Act 3: Waiting for Joe – Shalom Auslander
  - Music interlude: Bettye LaVette, The High Road
- Episode 319 – "And the Call Was Coming From the Basement"
  - Show description: Scary stories that are all true.
  - Prologue: Ira Glass and Albert Donnay read a ghost story from a 1921 medical journal.
  - Act 1: The Hills Have Eyes – Alix Blumberg
  - Music interlude: 45 Grave, Evil
  - Act 2: The Hitcher – Ira Glass
  - Act 3: And the Call Was Coming from ... the Listeners!
  - Act 4: Graveyard Shift – David Sedaris
  - Music interlude: Gnarls Barkley, The Boogie Monster
- Episode 320 – "What's In a Number – 2006 Edition"
  - Show description: Discussion about a new study by The Lancet about the number of Iraqis who have died since the US invasion.
  - Prologue: Ira Glass talks with ordinary Iraqis about life after the invasion.
  - Act 1: Truth, Damn Truth and Statistics – Alex Blumberg
  - Act 2: Not Just a Number
  - Act 3: The War This Time – Ira Glass
  - Music interlude: The Roots, Somebody's Gotta Do It
- Episode 321 – "Sink or Swim"
  - Prologue: a story about a German interpreter for Ford whose skills fail him
  - Act 1: Mr. Central High
  - Act 2: I'm Not a Doctor, but I Play One at the Holiday Inn
  - Act 3: If This Ark Is A-Rockin', Don't Come A-Knockin' – Jonathan Goldstein interprets the story of Noah's Ark
- Episode 322 – "Shouting Across the Divide"
  - Show description: Stories of Muslim and non-Muslim relations.
  - Prologue: A depiction of Muhammad on display in the main courtroom of the U.S. Supreme Court.
  - Act 1: Which One of These Is Not Like the Others?—Why is it so hard for Muslims and non-Muslims to get along in the fourth grade?
  - Act 2: America the Ad Campaign – Shalom Auslander
