= List of 2015 This American Life episodes =

In 2015, there were 33 new This American Life episodes.

- Episode 544 – "Batman"
  - air date: 2015-01-09
  - Act 1: Batman Begins.
  - Act 2: The Dark Knight Rises.
- Episode 545 – "If You Don't Have Anything Nice to Say, SAY IT IN ALL CAPS"
  - air date: 2015-01-23
  - Act 1: Ask Not for Whom The Bell Trolls; It Trolls for Thee.
  - Act 2: Freedom Fries.
  - Act 3: Words of Prey.
  - Act 4: Mailer Demon.
- Episode 546 – "Burroughs 101"
  - air date: 2015-01-30
  - Act 1: Burroughs, Part One.
  - Act 2: Burroughs, Part Two.
- Episode 547 – "Cops See It Differently, Part One"
  - air date: 2015-02-06
  - Act 1:
  - Act 2:
- Episode 548 – "Cops See It Differently, Part Two"
  - air date: 2015-02-13
  - Act 1: Inconvenience Store.
  - Act 2: Comey Don't Play That.
- Episode 549 – "Amateur Hour"
  - air date: 2015-02-27
  - Act 1: Theater of War.
  - Act 2: And Baby Makes 0011.
  - Act 3: Commander In Brief.
- Episode 550 – "Three Miles"
  - air date: 2015-03-13
  - Act 1:
  - Act 2:
- Episode 551 – "Good Guys 2015"
  - air date: 2015-03-20
  - Act 1: Takes One To Know One.
  - Act 2: Heels On The Bus.
  - Act 3: No Man Left Behind.
  - Act 4: The Test.
- Episode 552 – "Need To Know Basis"
  - air date: 2015-03-27
  - Act 1: Full Disclosure.
  - Act 2: Total Eclipse of the Son.
  - Act 3: The Favorite.
- Episode 553 – "Stuck In The Middle (2015)"
  - air date: 2015-04-03
  - Act 1: Do You Hear What I Hear?
  - Act 2: Sunrise, Sun-Get.
  - Act 3: Contrails of My Tears.
- Episode 554 – "Not It!"
  - air date: 2015-04-10
  - Act 1: Como Se Dice "Not It"?
  - Act 2: Last But Not Least.
  - Act 3: The Big Crapple.
- Episode 555 – "The Incredible Rarity of Changing Your Mind"
  - air date: 2015-04-24
  - Act 1: Do Ask, Do Tell.
  - Act 2: Crime Pays.
  - Act 3: Glacial Change
- Episode 556 – "Same Bed, Different Dreams"
  - air date: 2015-05-01
  - Act 1: Dream Weevil.
  - Act 2: Smell You Later.
  - Act 3: The Haunter Becomes the Haunted.
  - Act 4: Overnight Flight.
  - Updated as Episode 718 – "Same Bed, Different Dreams".
- Episode 557 – "Birds & Bees"
  - air date: 2015-05-15
  - Act 1: Some Like it Not (On the Neck).
  - Act 2: If You See Racism Say Racism.
  - Act 3: About that Farm Upstate.
- Episode 558 – "Game Face"
  - air date: 2015-05-29
  - Act 1: 200 Dog Night, featuring Blair Braverman.
  - Act 2: Funny Face.
  - Act 3: Who Put the Face in Game Face?
  - Act 4: Frankly Miss Scarlet.
- Episode 559 – "Captain's Log"
  - air date: 2015-06-26
  - Act 1: Cookies and Monsters.
  - Act 2: Romancing the Phone.
  - Act 3: A Quiet Street in Richmond.
  - Act 4: A Brief History of Us.
- Episode 560 – "Abdi And The Golden Ticket"
  - air date: 2015-07-03
  - Act 1:
  - Act 2:
- Episode 561 – "NUMMI 2015"
  - air date: 2015-07-17
  - Act 1:
  - Act 2:
- Episode 562 – "The Problem We All Live With"
  - air date: 2015-07-31
  - Act 1: The Problem We All Live With PART ONE.
  - Act 2: The Problem We All Live With PART TWO.
- Episode 563 – "The Problem We All Live With - Part Two"
  - air date: 2015-08-07
  - Act 1: My Secret Public Plan.
  - Act 2: What’s It All About, Arne?
- Episode 564 – "Too Soon?"
  - air date: 2015-08-14
  - Act 1: But Wait, There's More!
  - Act 2: Pink Slip.
- Episode 565 – "Lower 9 + 10"
  - air date: 2015-08-28
  - Act 1: First Stop.
  - Act 2: Second Stop.
  - Act 3: Third Stop.
  - Act 4: Fourth Stop.
  - Act 5: Fifth Stop.
  - Act 6: Sixth Stop.
- Episode 566 – "The Land of Make Believe"
  - air date: 2015-09-11
  - Act 1: Overboard.
  - Act 2: The Lyin' Kings.
- Episode 567 – "What's Going On In There?"
  - air date: 2015-09-18
  - Act 1: I Can Explain.
  - Act 2: RSV-Pa.
- Episode 568 – "Human Spectacle 2015"
  - air date: 2015-10-02
  - Act 1: I Am The Eggplant.
  - Act 2: I Always Feel Like Somebody's Watching Me.
  - Act 3: The Big Break.
- Episode 569 – "Put A Bow On It"
  - air date: 2015-10-09
  - Act 1: The Room Where It Happens.
  - Act 2: The Wedding Crasher.
  - Act 3: Drivers Wanted. Really Really Wanted.
- Episode 570 – "The Night In Question"
  - air date: 2015-10-16
  - Act 1: The Night.
  - Act 2: The Morning.
- Episode 571 – "The Heart Wants What It Wants"
  - air date: 2015-10-30
  - Act 1: Jesse’s Girl.
  - Act 2: My Love Is Blue.
  - Act 3: Unbreak My Heart.
- Episode 572 – "Transformers"
  - air date: 2015-11-06
  - Act 1: Optimus, Way Past Her Prime.
  - Act 2: Streetwise.
  - Act 3: Richard Pierce.
  - Act 4: Trailbreaker.
- Episode 573 – "Status Update"
  - air date: 2015-11-29
  - Act 1: Finding the Self in Selfie.
  - Act 2: Mon Ami Ta-Nehisi.
  - Act 3: There Owes the Neighborhood.
  - Act 4: 76-Year-Old Quarterback Throws Hail Mary Pass.
- Episode 574 – "Sinatra's 100th Birthday"
  - air date: 2015-12-11
  - Act 1: Frank Sinatra Has a Cold.
  - Act 2: One Sinatra Fan ... Versus All Of Network TV.
  - Act 3: History Lesson.
  - Act 4: The Death of Frank Sinatra.
  - Act 5: Chairman of the Block.
- Episode 575 – "Poetry of Propaganda"
  - air date: 2015-12-18
  - Act 1: Guerrilla Marketing
  - Act 2: Not Our Town
  - Act 3: The Spy Who Didn't Know She Was A Spy.
  - Act 4: Party On!
- Episode 576 – "Say Yes To Christmas"
  - air date: 2015-12-25
  - Act 1: Christmas On A High Wire.
  - Act 2: Oily Potter and The Gobble of Fire.
  - Act 3: The First Noel.
