= List of 2008 This American Life episodes =

In 2008, there were 25 This American Life episodes.

Link and Title	Original Airing Date	Act 1	Act 2	Act 3	Act 4	Act 5
Episode 347 – "Matchmakers"	1/18/2008	A Good Year For Grand Gestures	Part Of Me, Why Not Take Part Of Me	Babies Buying Babies		
Episode 348 – "Tough Room"	2/8/2008	Make 'Em Laff	Bar Car Prophesy	Mission: Impossible	Tough News Room	
Episode 349 – "Valentine's Day 2008"	2/15/2008	Before And After	The Over-Protective Kind	Istanbul		
Episode 350 – "Human Resources"	2/29/2008	The Rubber Room	The Plan	Almost Human Resources		
Episode 351 – "Return to Childhood 2008"	3/7/2008	Ich Bin Ein Mophead	Punk In A Gray Flannel Suit	Ariel Sharon, Shimon Peres, David Ben Gurion, and Me!	When We Were Angels	
Episode 352 – "The Ghost of Bobby Dunbar"	3/14/2008	Part One	Part Two			
Episode 353 – "The Audacity of Government"	3/28/2008	The Prez Vs. The Commish	This American Wife	44		
Episode 354 – "Mistakes Were Made"	4/18/2008	You're As Cold As Ice	You're Willing To Sacrifice Our Love			
Episode 355 – "The Giant Pool of Money"	5/9/2008	Part One	Part Two			
Episode 356 – "The Prosecutor"	5/30/2008	Conviction	Retaliation			
Episode 357 – "The Truth Will Out"	6/13/2008	Lieland	The Spy Who Bugged Me	Rosa In The Study With The Atm Card		
Episode 358 – "Social Engineering"	6/27/2008	Choosers, Not Beggars	Take My Bike...Please	Educated Guess		
Episode 359 – "Life After Death"	7/18/2008	Guity As Not Charged	Soldier Of Misfortune			
Episode 360 – "Switched at Birth"	7/25/2008	Part One	Part Two			
Episode 361 – "Fear of Sleep"	8/8/2008	Stranger In The Night	Sleep's Tiniest Enemies	The Bitter Fruits Of Wakefulness	Hollywood-induced Nightmare	A Small Taste Of The Big Sleep
Episode 362 – "Got You Pegged"	8/22/2008	The Fat Blue Line	Stereotypes Uber Alles	Yes, No Or Baby	Paradise Lost	
Episode 363 – "Enforcers"	9/12/2008	Hanging In Chad	Now You SEC Me, Now You Don't			
Episode 364 – "Going Big"	9/26/2008	Harlem Renaissance	Lonely Hearts Club Band...Of One	Prisoner Of The Heart		
Episode 365 – "Another Frightening Show About the Economy"	10/3/2008	The Day The Market Died	Out Of The Hedges And Into The Woods	Swap Cops	What's Next	
Episode 366 – "A Better Mousetrap 2008"	10/10/2008	Mother Of Invention	Financial Mousetrap	Everything Must Go	The Not-for-profit Motive	
Episode 367 – "Ground Game"	10/24/2008	Scranton	State College	Union Halls	State College, Part Two	Scranton, Part Two
Episode 368 – "Who Do You Think You Are?"	11/7/2008	Hard Times	What A Difference An Election Day Makes	Putting The Cart Before The Porsche		
Episode 369 – "Poultry Slam 2008"	11/28/2008	You Gotta Ask Yourself One Question: Do You Feel Clucky? Well...do Ya, Punk?	Winged Migration	A Pastor And His Flock	Twistery Mystery	Chicken Coop For The Soul
Episode 370 – "Ruining It for the Rest of Us"	12/19/2008	Shots In The Dark	Tragedy Minus Comedy Equals Time	Disturbing The Peace Train		
Episode 371 – "Scenes from a Mall"	12/26/2008	Love Line	Not Dead Yet	Santa Fight Club	Job: Security	
