= List of 1998 This American Life episodes =

In 1998, there were 31 new This American Life episodes.

- Episode 88 – "Numbers"

Numbers lie. Numbers cover over complicated feelings and ambiguous situations. In this week's show, stories of people trying to use numbers to describe things that should not be quantified. 1998-01-02

- Episode 89 – "Sibling Rivalry"

Stories about people who are destined to fight: brothers and sisters. 1998-01-09

- Episode 90 – "Telephone"

Stories of who we are on the phone, of things we learn on the phone, and of things that happen on the phone that don't happen anywhere else. 1998-01-16

- Episode 91 – "Escape the Box"

Stories of people trying to escape the box of their own lives, and create new lives. 1998-01-30

- Episode 92 – "Leave the Mask On"

Stories about those moments when someone tries to tell you a little bit more about themselves than you'd really rather know. 1998-02-07

- Episode 93 – "Valentine's Day '98"

Stories about couples that all take place decades after that moment their eyes first meet. 1998-02-14

- Episode 94 – "How To"

What happens during a "how-to," and what our how-to's say about us. Most how-to's promise that you'll not only learn skills, you'll be transformed. 1998-02-27

- Episode 95 – "Monogamy"

How should we react to people who are in non-monogamous relationships? What should we think of these struggles with monogamy? 1998-03-07

- Episode 96 – "Pinned by History"

People who left their private lives and were seized by some huge historical moment. 1998-03-13

- Episode 97 – "Death to Wacky"

An assault on the idea of wackiness. And then, an appreciation of wackiness, and an analysis of wackiness in American culture. Thirteen ways to describe wackiness. 1998-03-20

- Episode 98 – "Throwing the First Punch"

Stories about what it means to be a person who throws the first punch ... and how hard it is to give up. 1998-03-27

- Episode 99 – "I Enjoy Being a Girl, Sort Of"

Variations on what it means to be a girl and what it means to be a woman. 1998-04-10

- Episode 100 – "Radio"

For the 100th episode of This American Life, a radio show about the pleasures of radio. About what makes radio so great ... and what makes it so terrible. 1998-04-24

- Episode 101 – "Niagara"

During this hour, a special edition of our show: stories about Niagara Falls, half of them from documentary producer Alix Spiegel, who went to the Falls and interviewed people living there; and half from playwright David Kodeski, who grew up in the town of Niagara Falls. 1998-05-01

- Episode 102 – "Roadtrip!"

With all the American movies and songs and books about the joy of the open road, it's hard for an American to take just a normal road trip without huge expectations. 1998-05-15

- Episode 103 – "Scenes from a Transplant"

An NPR reporter leaves her three-year-old son and heads to Omaha — for cancer treatment — a last chance to save her life. After years of covering stories about medicine, Rebecca Perl enters the hospital as a patient. She moves from the world of healthy people into the world of sick ones. What she sees and what she learns. 1998-05-29

- Episode 104 – "Music Lessons"

What's frustrating about music lessons, what's miraculous about them, and what they actually teach us. This show was recorded in front of a live audience at the Yerba Buena Center for the Arts in San Francisco, with help from KQED-FM, during the '98 Public Radio Conference in San Francisco. 1998-06-05

- Episode 105 – "Take a Negro Home Tonight"

Two stories of people who try to cross the color line — and why it's still so hard. We hear the story of a failed interracial marriage and the story of a teenager from a poor inner city neighborhood (Cedric Jennings, pictured) who ends up at an Ivy League University — and how he barely survives there. 1998-06-12

- Episode 106 – "Father's Day '98"

For this Father's Day, stories in which fathers and their kids sit down and try to have an honest moment together. And stories about fathers who aren't close with their kids. 1998-06-19

- Episode 107 – "Trail of Tears"

For the July 4th holiday weekend, writer Sarah Vowell and her twin sister re-trace the "Trail of Tears" — the route their Cherokee ancestors took when expelled from their own land by President Andrew Jackson. 1998-07-03

- Episode 108 – "Truth and Lies at Age Ten"

Two stories of children lying to themselves and others. A woman who'd been diagnosed with cystic fibrosis talks about the lies she told herself as a child. And Dan Gediman tells the story of how he was cast in the public TV show Zoom, which aired from 1972 to 1979, at the age of ten. Then he was cut from the cast before the show ever went on the air. So for years, he lied about it. He let friends believe he was on Zoom. 1998-08-07

- Episode 109 – "Notes on Camp"

Stories of summer camp. People who love camp say that non-camp people simply don't understand what's so amazing about camp. In this program, we attempt to bridge the gap of misunderstanding between camp people and non-camp people. 1998-08-28

- Episode 110 – "Mapping"

Five ways of mapping the world. One story about people who make maps the traditional way — by drawing things we can see. And other stories about people who map the world using smell, sound, touch, and taste. The world redrawn by the five senses. 1998-09-04

- Episode 111 – "Adventures in the Simple Life"

Two brothers set out with a friend to cross America on horseback. They take a tape recorder with them to make a kind of audio journal of their trip. What they find, who they meet, and what they learn in this experiment in 19th-century travel. Plus other stories. 1998-09-11

- Episode 112 – "Ladies and Germs"

Germs, and how they make us leave the world of rational thinking. 1998-10-02

- Episode 113 – "Windfall"

What happens when you suddenly strike it rich. And the power money has over our lives, for good and bad. 1998-10-16

- Episode 114 – "Last Words"

Stories of people's last words before death. Their one last shot at figuring things out, summing things up. One last moment of asserting the fact of our existence, at the moment of our annihilation. 1998-10-23

- Episode 115 – "First Day"

Stories of the first day on the job, the first day in a relationship, the first day in school. On the first day, any first day, we're expected to live by the rules and customs of the culture we're entering, but we don't know those rules and customs just yet. 1998-11-13

- Episode 116 – "Poultry Slam '98"

For Thanksgiving, the time of year when poultry consumption is highest, it's our annual program about turkeys, chickens, and fowl of all types. 1998-11-27

- Episode 117 – "You Gonna Eat That?"

The family table is stage on which many family dramas are played out. We hear three stories...of three families...at three meals. 1998-12-11

- Episode 118 – "What You Lookin' At?"

Stories about seeing and being seen. Taped before a live audience in Town Hall in New York City in December 1998, this was a co-production with WNYC New York, featuring live music by the pop band They Might Be Giants and the This American Life Orchestra. 1998-12-18
