= List of 2007 This American Life episodes =

In 2007, there were 24 This American Life episodes.

- Episode 323 – "The Super"
  - Show description: Stories of the mysterious hold supers have on their buildings, or their buildings have on them.
  - Prologue: Ira speaks with a super who has exclusive access to a courtyard, but does not use it
  - Act #1: The Super Always Rings Twice
  - Music interlude: "Theme from Superman: The Movie"
  - Act #2: Super Duper
  - Music interlude: The White Stripes, "Blue Orchid"
  - Act #3: Please Re-Lease Me
  - Music interlude: Elvis Presley, "Working on a Building"
- Episode 324 – "My Brilliant Plan"
  - Act #1: Mr. Adam's Neighborhood – Nancy Updike and Adam Davidson
  - Act #2: Tragedy Minus Time Equals Happily Ever After
- Episode 325 – "Houses of Ill Repute"
  - Act #1: It's Not a Crack House, It's a Crack Home – Maherin Gangat
    - Maherin Gangat interviews an old man who keeps rather unsavory guests in his New York City home.
  - Act #2: The Crisco Kid
  - Music interlude: Ted Nugent, "Stranglehold"
  - Act #3: Bully's Pulpit – Alex Blumberg
  - Music interlude: Gwen Stefani, "U Started It"
- Episode 326 – "Quiz Show"
  - Act #1: Gamester of Ireland is Fine – Ronan Kelly
  - Act #2: Dire Enigmas for Elite Fans – Lisa Pollack
  - Music interlude: The Undertones, "Smarter Than You"
  - Act #3: Girls in Need of a Safer Time – Robin Epstein
- Episode 327 – "By Proxy"
  - Act #1: I'm the Decider – Davy Rothbart
    - David Rothbar makes a decision that is not his to make.
  - Act #2: Kill the Messengers – Ira Glass
    - What it is like to be the proxy for American soldiers in Iraq.
  - Act #3: Redemption by Proxy – Eve Ambrams
    - A girl steps in for her dead best friend.
- Episode 328 – "What I Learned from Television"
  - Show description: Collection of commentaries from live shows about television. All interludes performed by a band touring with This American Life, Mates of State.
  - Prologue: Ira Glass describes the effect of television on our culture.
  - Act #1: 29 – David Rakoff
    - David Rakoff takes the task of watching and describing the first 29 hours of television he has watched in years. (Takes its name from the average amount of time spent watching television each week by the typical person)
  - Act #2: Turkeys in Pilgrim Clothing – Sarah Vowell
    - Sarah Vowell talks about the ubiquitous "Thanksgiving Episode", and how writers always manage to dilute the truth.
  - Act #3: Radio on the TV – Ira Glass
    - Ira Glass reflects on TV, and in particular on a line from an episode of The O.C. which holds special meaning to This American Life.
  - Act #4: My Other Dog's a German Shepherd – Dan Savage
    - Columnist Dan Savage commentates on the portrayal of sexuality on television and what effect this can have.
- Episode 329 – "Nice Work If You Can Get It"
  - Show description: Stories of sudden fame, quick riches, and the downside of the dream job.
  - Prologue: Host Ira Glass talks with some real-live NASA astronauts: Cady Coleman, Chris Cassidy, and Marsha Ivins. On average, NASA schedules just a couple of space missions a year. But it employs 95 astronauts. This means that only a tiny percentage of an astronaut's career is actually spent in space, and some never get there. Ira talks with these three astronauts about how they spend the vast majority of their time: on the ground, in an office, doing paperwork.
  - Act #1: I'm Not a TV Star, but I Play One on TV.
    - This American Life contributor John Hodgman was unexpectedly chosen to be in a series of high-profile Apple Computer commercials (he plays a PC). He tells the story of what happens when celebrity hunts you down and finds you...on your living room couch, pushing 40, and a couple sizes larger than you want to be. John was recorded live during our "What I Learned from Television" tour, before a sold-out audience at Royce Hall in Los Angeles.
  - Act #2: Show Me the Annuity.
    - This American Life producer Alex Blumberg talks with Ed Ugel, who had a very unusual dream job: he bought jackpots from lottery winners. When you win the lottery, your prize is often paid out in yearly installments. And Ed would offer winners a lump sum in exchange for their yearly checks. He's talked with thousands of lottery winners, and the vast majority, he says, wish they would never won. Ed is writing a book about his years in the "lump sum industry" called Money for Nothing: One Man's Journey through the Dark Side of Lottery Millions. It comes out in September 2007.
  - Act #3: The Homesick Explorer.
    - Sarah Vowell tells the story of mapmaker Charles Preuss. Preuss charted the Western Territories with John Charles Fremont and Kit Carson. Though Pruess' maps were wildly popular, he hated pretty much every minute of the expedition. Dermot Mulroney reads from Preuss's diary.
  - Act #3: Just One Thing Missing.
    - Reporter Douglas McGray interviews a college student in California with good grades, an excellent work ethic, but no possible way to get a legal job. She's lived in the U.S. since she was little, but her parents are undocumented; and she is, too. Most of her friends and teachers do not even know. Douglas McGray is a fellow at the New America Foundation.
- Episode 330 – "My Reputation"
  - Show description: Stories of people trying to recover from damage to their reputations—sometimes caused by others, sometimes self-inflicted.
  - Prologue: Robyn Forest thought she had gotten her big break when a magazine assigned her to write about a famous Japanese pop singer. Instead, Robyn ended up on Japanese television denying that she and the singer were having an affair. Host Ira Glass talks with Robyn about how she accidentally ruined her own reputation. (11 minutes)
  - Act #1: Not Everybody Loves Raymond.
    - This American Life producer Sarah Koenig tells a story of the rise and fall of a politician's reputation. Raymond Buckley, a Democratic operative from New Hampshire, was instrumental in his party's success in last fall's midterm elections. He set his sights on becoming the chair of the state Democratic Party. But three months before the election for party chair, one of Buckley's political rivals accused him of one of the worst things that anyone can be accused of. It threatened to destroy not only his career, but his life. Unlike most politicians at the center of a scandal, Buckley was willing to talk about what he went through and how it changed him. (35 minutes)
  - Act #2: The Hole Truth.
    - It is one thing to wonder what other people really think of you. It is quite another to go out and ask them. Writer Gabriel Delahaye asked his closest friends—on tape—what they really think of him, and the answers surprised him. The story of one man's brave quest to face up to his reputation. (11 minutes)
- Episode 331 – "Habeas Schmabeas 2007"
- Episode 332 – "The Ten Commandments"
- Episode 333 – "The Center for Lessons Learned"
- Episode 334 – "Duty Calls"
- Episode 335 – "Big Wide World"
  - Show description: Stories of people experiencing the world from new perspectives.
  - Prologue: Ira Glass sees beer for the first time in real life at a friend's house. He is in seventh grade and is forced to reconsider his view of drinking. Ira's friend from Ukraine, Valentina Filimonova, relates her dismay at the vast array of tampon choices offered at her local supermarket.
  - Act #1: Teen Wolf...Blitzer – Gideon Yago
    - Haider Hamsa is a professional teenager for the Iraqi Ministry of Information. He met with foreign media and dignitaries to represent Iraq. Just prior to the American invasion of Iraq, Haider leaves Bagdad with his family to hide in a farmhouse. After the invasion, Haider returns to Bagdad against the advice of his father. Haider later continues to go against his father's advice and experiences the occupation as a translator.
  - Music interlude: Ala Honak, Sajada Al Ubaid
  - Act #2: A Sense of Place. – Tony HIll
    - Tony Hill takes his friend, Sally Goode, to an unknown location. Sally, who was born blind, describes her observations of the location as she tries to figure out where she is.
  - Music interlude: Your Littlest World, The Rogers Sisters
- Episode 336 – "Who Can You Save?"
  - Show description: Stories of people trying to do the right thing, with various degrees of success.
  - Prologue: Tim Jaccard relates experiences of his time as a police medic. He tells of many abandoned babies – those he could save and those he could not.
  - Act #1: Kill One, Save Five – RadioLab
    - Would you kill one man to save five by pulling a lever? Would you kill one man to save five by pushing the one off a bridge? The vast difference between these answers leads to an interesting discussion.
  - Act #2: Rescue You, Rescue Me. – Ira Glass
    - Randy Frescoln volunteers to go to Iraq for reconstruction after his previous experience in Afghanistan and related experience in infrastructure in the United States. In the Sunni Triangle he meets great resistance to his presence from the populus. Kiki Munshi discusses the difficulties working on a "provincial reconstruction team" (PRT) volunteer. Strephanie Miley, head of Randy's PRT, concludes the efforts are worthwhile.
  - Music interlude: Skavavars, Benni Hemm Hemm
  - Act #3: The Murderer. – Brady Udall
    - Brady Udall tells the story of helping a stranger. In exchange for the help, the stranger promises a favor – any favor at any time. When Brady looks up the stranger years later, he finds him rather changed.
  - Music interlude: You Can't Save Everybody, Fats Kapin, Kieran Kane, and Kevin Welch
- Episode 337 – "Man vs. History"
  - Show description: Stories of people taking their lives into their own hands.
  - Prologue: Dal LaManga, inventor of the Tweezerman tweezers, prepares to visit Iraq.
  - Act #1: Man of LaMagna. – Sarah Koenig
    - Dal LaManga visits Iraq and meets with Mohammed Al-Dynee. This meeting earns him respect that leads to further meetings with Iraqis. After limited success, he returns to the United States to run for president.
  - Music interlude: Overture from 'The Man of La Mancha', Original Broadway Cast Recording
  - Act #2: Wenceslas Square. – Arthur Phillips
    - Arthur Phillips reads his story, Wenceslas Square.
  - Music interlude: Be by My Side, Barbara Acklin
- Episode 338 – "The Spokesman"
  - Show description: Stories of public spokespeople in their personal and professional lives.
  - Prologue: David Iserson relates his days as a high school nerd changing high schools and aspiring to be an actor.
  - Act #1: What Part of 'Bomb' Don't You Understand? – Jon Ronson
    - Rachel North was on the London underground during the bombing. She survived and related her experience on a blog. She relates the unexpected backlash against her blog by conspiracy theorists.
  - Music interlude: Tell It Like It Is, Dirty Dozen Brass Band
  - Act #2: Mr. Successful. – Doug McGray
    - Anthony Pico discusses his experiences in foster care. His gift for public speaking helps him escape an otherwise discouraging situation. Despite his advantages over many other foster children, he still struggles with school and has an uncertain future.
  - Music interlude: Bad Mouth, Fugazi
  - Act #3: Impeachment Day. – Ira Glass
    - Joe Lockhart, press secretary for Bill Clinton, tells funny stories from his time in office.
  - Music interlude: Summertime, George Gershwin, with Bill Clinton on Tenor Saxophone
- Episode 339 – "Break-Up"
- Episode 340 – "The Devil in Me"
  - Show description: Stories of people trying to exorcise their inner demons.
  - Prologue: Ira Glass talks about traits he is not proud of but cannot seem to change.
  - Act #1: And So We Meet Again. – Lisa Pollak
    - The story of Sam Slaven, an Iraq War veteran plagued with hatred for Muslims.
  - Act #2: Vox Diaboli. – Nancy Updike
    - The inner voice that tells us to do the wrong thing.
  - Music interlude: Germs, Lexicon Devil
  - Act #3: The Devil Wears Birkenstocks. – Dave Dickerson
    - The story of when Dave Dickerson took on a demon in his college classroom.
  - Music interlude: David Karsten Daniels, Jesus and the Devil
- Episode 341 – "How To Talk To Kids"
  - Show description: Stories of adults taking very different approaches to communicating with children.
  - Prologue: Ira Glass asks fifth graders to explain what adults do wrong when talking to children.
  - Act #1: So, Kids: A Priest, a Rabbi, and a Hooker Walk into a Bar... – Jane Feltes
    - Professional comedians Sean O'Connor and Nick Maritato are used to saying things that kids are not supposed to hear but get booked on a tour of kids' summer camps.
  - Music interlude: The Replacements, Kids Don't Follow
  - Act #2: Age of Consent. – Ira Glass, Julie Snyder
    - The teen-aged editors of Sex, Etc., talk about the mistakes parents make when talking to their kids about sex. Then, the story of an anonymous mother who learned that her daughter was having sex.
  - Music interlude: Patrizia & Jimmy, Trust Your Child
  - Act #3: Use Your Words.
    - Dan Savage, host of the podcast Savage Love, makes the case for yelling at children, and reflects on how his views on how to talk to kids have changed over the years.
- Episode 342 – "How to Rest in Peace"
  - Show description: Stories about people trying to figure out how to live normally after the death of a loved one.
  - Prologue: Rachel Howard talks about coming to peace with not knowing who killed her father.
  - Act #1 Dry Eyes and Videotape – Jason Minter
    - Jason makes a documentary revisiting every aspect of his mother's murder.
  - Music interlude: It's All Right to Cry, Moufette
  - Act #2 The Good Son
    - A son helps his mother commit suicide.
  - Music interlude: Before You Leave – Mary Gauthier
- Episode 343 – "Poultry Slam 07"
- Episode 344 – "The Competition"
- Episode 345 – "Ties That Bind"
- Episode 346 – "Home Alone"
  - Show description: Stories about what happens when people are left home alone.
  - Music interlude: Hope There's Someone – Antony and the Johnsons
