= List of 2016 This American Life episodes =

In 2016, there were 30 new This American Life episodes.

- Episode 577 – "Something Only I Can See"
  - air date: 2016-01-15
- Episode 578 – "I Thought I Knew You"
  - air date: 2016-01-29
- Episode 579 – "My Damn Mind"
  - air date: 2016-02-12
- Episode 580 – "That's One Way to Do It"
  - air date: 2016-02-19
- Episode 581 – "Anatomy of Doubt"
  - air date: 2016-02-26
- Episode 582 – "When the Beasts Come Marching In"
  - air date: 2016-03-11
- Episode 583 – "It'll Make Sense When You're Older"
  - air date: 2016-03-25
- Episode 584 – "For Your Reconsideration"
  - air date: 2016-04-08
- Episode 585 – "In Defense of Ignorance"
  - air date: 2016-04-22
- Episode 586 – "Who Do We Think We Are?"
  - air date: 2016-05-06
- Episode 587 – "The Perils of Intimacy"
  - air date: 2016-05-27
- Episode 588 – "Mind Games 2016"
  - air date: 2016-06-03
- Episode 589 – "Tell Me I'm Fat"
  - air date: 2016-06-17
- Episode 590 – "Choosing Wrong"
  - air date: 2016-06-24
- Episode 591 – "Get Your Money's Worth"
  - air date: 2016-07-15
- Episode 592 – "Are We There Yet?"
  - air date: 2016-07-29
- Episode 593 – "Don't Have to Live Like a Refugee"
  - air date: 2016-08-05
- Episode 594 – "My Summer Self"
  - air date: 2016-08-12
- Episode 595 – "Deep End of the Pool"
  - air date: 2016-08-26
- Episode 596 – "Becoming a Badger"
  - air date: 2016-09-09
- Episode 597 – "One Last Thing Before I Go"
  - air date: 2016-09-23
- Episode 598 – "My Undesirable Talent"
  - air date: 2016-10-07
- Episode 599 – "Seriously?"
  - air date: 2016-10-21
- Episode 600 – "Will I Know Anyone at This Party?"
  - air date: 2016-10-28
- Episode 601 – "Master of Her Domain... Name"
  - air date: 2016-11-04
- Episode 602 – "The Sun Comes Up"
  - air date: 2016-11-11
- Episode 603 – "Once More, With Feeling"
  - air date: 2016-12-02
- Episode 604 – "20 Years Later"
  - air date: 2016-12-09
- Episode 605 – "Kid Logic 2016"
  - air date: 2016-12-16
- Episode 606 – "Just What I Wanted"
  - air date: 2016-12-23
