= List of 2014 This American Life episodes =

In 2014, there were 29 new This American Life episodes.

- Episode 515 – "Good Guys"
  - Act 1: Takes One to Know One
  - Act 2: Heels on the Bus
  - Act 3: No Man Left Behind
  - Act 4: Deep Dark Open Secret
- Episode 516 – "Stuck in the Middle"
  - Act 1: Do You Hear What I Hear?
  - Act 2: Sunrise, Sun-Get
  - Act 3: They Love a Man in a Uniform
- Episode 517 – "Day at the Beach"
  - Act 1: Mexican Beach Doctor
  - Act 2: Long Talk on a Short Pier
  - Act 3: The Beachcomber
  - Act 4: Now We Are Five
- Episode 518 – "Except for That One Thing"
  - Act 1: Not Okay Cupid
  - Act 2: Hungry Hungry People
  - Act 3: Start Me Up
  - Act 4: Run on Sentence
  - Act 5: Happy Accident
- Episode 519 – "Dead Men Tell No Tales"
  - Act 1: Act 1
  - Act 2: Act 2
  - Act 3: Act 3
- Episode 520 – "No Place Like Home"
  - Act 1: Flight Simulation
  - Act 2: Phone Home
  - Act 3: The Hostess With the Toastess
- Episode 521 – "Bad Baby"
  - Act 1: The Road To Badness
  - Act 2: The Devil Went Down To Jersey
  - Act 3: This is Gonna Hurt Me a Lot More than It's Gonna Hurt You
  - Act 4: We Are Fine Parents
- Episode 522 – "Tarred and Feathered"
  - Act 1: The Hounds Of Blairsville
  - Act 2: Help Wanted
- Episode 523 – "Death and Taxes"
  - Act 1: Death
  - Act 2: Taxes
- Episode 524 – "I Was So High"
  - Act 1: High On The Corporate Ladder
  - Act 2: You Were So High
  - Act 3: Bottom Of The Eighth
  - Act 4: Straight Man
  - Act 5: DEA Agent Takes A Hit
- Episode 525 – "Call For Help"
  - Act 1: When May Day Falls In April
  - Act 2: Government Assistance
  - Act 3: Horse Of A Different Color
- Episode 526 – "Is That What I Look Like?"
  - Act 1: Blunt Force
  - Act 2: One Life To Live
  - Act 3: The Blunder Years
- Episode 527 – "180 Degrees"
  - Act 1: Seeing The Forrest Through The Little Trees
  - Act 2: Unsafety Exit
  - Act 3: I'm The One Who Knocks
- Episode 528 – "The Radio Drama Episode"
  - Act 1: 21 Chump Street: The Musical
  - Act 2: Of Mice And Men
  - Act 3: How Do You Slow This Thing Down (Podcast Only)
  - Act 4: Bus! Stop!
- Episode 529 – "Human Spectacle"
  - Act 1: I Am The Eggplant
  - Act 2: I Always Feel Like Somebody's Watching Me
  - Act 3: I Am Iraq, I Am An Island
- Episode 530 – "Mind Your Own Business"
  - Act 1: Jill House Rules
  - Act 2: Cop Versus Cop
- Episode 531 – "Got Your Back"
  - Act 1: Absolutely Stabulous
  - Act 2: By the Waters of Haggle-On
  - Act 3: One Woman Show
- Episode 532 – "Magic Words"
  - Act 1: I Believe I Can Fly
  - Act 2: Rainy Days and Mondys
  - Act 3: Pescatarian
- Episode 533 – "It's Not the Product, It's the Person"
  - Act 1: I Got 99 Problems and a Pitch Is One
  - Act 2: The Business of Show
  - Act 3: The Other Real World
- Episode 534 – "A Not-So-Simple Majority"
  - Act 1: A Not So Simple Majority, Part 1
  - Act 2: A Not So Simple Majority, Part 2
- Episode 535 – "Origin Story 2014"
  - Act 1: Mad Man
  - Act 2: Silent Partner
  - Act 3: Wait Wait... Don't Film Me
  - Act 4: Bill Clinton's 7-Year-Old Brother
- Episode 536 – "The Secret Recordings of Carmen Segarra"
  - Act 1: Act 1
  - Act 2: Act 2
- Episode 537 – "The Alibi"
  - Act 1: Presents Series 1, Episode 1 of the spin-off podcast Serial, also titled The Alibi.
- Episode 538 – "Is This Working?"
  - Act 1: Time Out
  - Act 2: The Guinea Pig Becomes the Scientist
  - Act 3: The Talking Cure
- Episode 539 – "The Leap"
- Episode 540 – "A Front"
- Episode 541 – "Regrets, I've Had a Few"
- Episode 542 – "Wait, Do You Have the Map?"
- Episode 543 – "Wake Up Now"
