= List of 2012 This American Life episodes =

In 2012, there were 29 new This American Life episodes.

- Episode 454 – "Mr. Daisey and the Apple Factory"
  - This American Life retracted this episode two months after it was originally broadcast, after learning that Mike Daisey exaggerated or fabricated various claims about his experiences in China. The investigation behind the retraction is the subject of episode 460, "Retraction."
  - Act 1: Mr. Daisey Goes to China – Mike Daisey
  - Act 2: Act One – Ira Glass
- Episode 455 – "Continental Breakup"
  - Act 1: Currency of Dreams
  - Act 2: Eurotopia
  - Act 3: Ooh, I Shouldn't Have Done That!
  - Act 4: Do-Over
  - Act 5: What's a Greek Accountant Got to Do with Me?
- Episode 456 – "Reap What You Sow"
  - Act 1: Alien Experiment
  - Act 2: Ain't Nobody Here But Us Chickens – Danny Lobell
- Episode 457 – "What I Did for Love"
  - Act 1: Best Laid Plans
  - Act 2: 21 Chump Street
  - Act 3: Cold Stone Dreamery – Ben Loory
  - Act 4: Fantastic Mr. Fox – Jeanne Darst
- Episode 458 – "Play the Part"
  - Act 1: The Audacity of Louis Ortiz – Ryan Murdock
  - Act 2: Wife Lessons
- Episode 459 – "What Kind of Country"
  - Act 1: The Sound of Sirens
  - Act 2: Dream Come True
  - Act 3: Do You Want a Wake Up Call?
- Episode 460 – "Retraction"
  - The entire episode is spent retracting and examining Episode 454, including further investigation of claims made by Daisey by Glass, Rob Schmitz, the Shanghai correspondent for Marketplace, and New York Times reporter Charles Duhigg.
  - Act 1: Cathy's Account
  - Act 2: Mike's Account
  - Act 3: News That's Fit to Print
- Episode 461 – "Take the Money and Run for Office"
  - Act 1: The Hamster Wheel
  - Act 2: Pac Men
  - Act 3: The O.G.S.
- Episode 462 – "Own Worst Enemy"
  - Act 1: Aces Are Wild
  - Act 2: The Conversation
  - Act 3: Just as I Am
- Episode 463 – "Mortal Vs. Venial"
  - Act 1: The Postcard Always Rings Twice
  - Act 2: The Disenchanted Forest – Jonathan Goldstein
  - Act 3: The Geeks Come Out at Night
- Episode 464 – "Invisible Made Visible"
  - A rebroadcast of portions of the live show broadcast into movie theaters on May 3, 2012.
  - Act 1: Does a Bear Hit in the Woods?
  - Act 2: Groundhog Dayne – With Special Guest Taylor Dayne
  - Act 3: Stiff as a Board, Light as a Feather – David Rakoff
  - Act 4: Turn Around Bright Eyes – David Sedaris
- Episode 465 – "What Happened At Dos Erres"
  - Act 1: Act One
  - Act 2: Act Two
- Episode 466 – "Blackjack"
  - Act 1: Render Unto Caesar's Palace What Is Due to Caesar's Palace
  - Act 2: Harrah's Today, Gone Tomorrow
- Episode 467 – "Americans in China"
  - Act 1: Why Do You Have to Go and Make Things So Complicated?
  - Act 2: Beautiful Downtown Wasteland
- Episode 468 – "Switcheroo"
  - Act 1: Healthy Start
  - Act 2: Forgive Us Our Press Passes
  - Act 3: Runaway Groom
- Episode 469 – "Hiding in Plain Sight"
  - Act 1: There's Something About Mary
  - Act 2: Objects May Be Closer Than They Appear
  - Act 3: Seven Year Snitch
- Episode 470 – "Show Me The Way"
  - Act 1: Just South of the Unicorns
  - Act 2: Oh the Places You Will Not Go!
- Episode 471 – "The Convert"
  - Act 1: Gym Rat
  - Act 2: Act Two
- Episode 472 – "Our Friend David"
  - A special episode devoted to the late David Rakoff. The episode consists of stories and interviews over the course of years with the radio show.
    - 65. Who's Canadian?
    - 116. Poultry Slam 1998
    - 241. 20 Acts in 60 Minutes
    - 156. What Remains
    - 208. Office Politics
    - Interview with Terry Gross
    - "Rent" Monologue
    - 12. Animals
    - 470. Show Me the Way – with Jonathan Goldstein
    - 389. Frenemies
    - Excerpts from "Love Dishonor, Marry, Die; Cherish, Perish...A Novel by David Rakoff"
- Episode 473 – "Loopholes"
  - Act 1: Death Takes a Policy
- Episode 474 – "Back to School"
  - Act 1: No, These Things Will Not Be on the Final Exam
  - Act 2: Act Two
- Episode 475 – "Send a Message"
  - Act 1: The Motherhood of the Traveling Pants
  - Act 2: Message in a Bottle
  - Act 3: Soul Sister
  - Act 4: Worst Mixtape Ever
- Episode 476 – "What Doesn't Kill You"
  - Act 1: Too Soon?
  - Act 2: Just Keep Breathing
  - Act 3: A Real Nail Biter
  - Act 4: The Year After
- Episode 477 – "Getting Away With It"
  - Act 1: Take Your Kid to Work Day
  - Act 2: Get Away with It After the Beep
  - Act 3: Crime and Tutus
  - Act 4: Pre K-O
- Episode 478 – "Red State Blue State"
  - Act 1: I Know You Are, but What Am I?
  - Act 2: Nothing in Moderation
- Episode 479 – "Little War on the Prairie"
  - Act 1: Act One
  - Act 2: Act Two
- Episode 480 – "Animal Sacrifice"
  - Act 1: Semper Fido
  - Act 2: Run Rabbit. No, Really, Run!
  - Act 3: Human Sacrifice
- Episode 481 – "This Week"
  - Act 1: Kabul, Afghanistan
  - Act 2: Tucson, Arizona
  - Act 3: Washington, D.C.
  - Act 4: New Orleans, LA
  - Act 5: Cairo, Egypt
  - Act 6: Boston, Logan Airport; Chicago, IL; Springfield, OR
- Episode 482 – "Lights, Camera, Christmas!"
  - Act 1: Christmas in 3-D
  - Act 2: Deer in the Footlights
  - Act 3: Piddler on the Roof
