= List of Stuff You Should Know episodes =

Stuff You Should Know is a free podcast and video series published by HowStuffWorks and hosted by Josh Clark and Charles W. "Chuck" Bryant, both writers at HowStuffWorks. The podcast educates listeners on a wide variety of topics, often using popular culture as a reference giving the podcast comedic value. Episodes are normally around 45 minutes in length, although for more in-depth topics the show has run longer than an hour.

The winner of the 2014 and the 2016 People's Voice Webby Award, the show is downloaded more than 1 million times per week and is consistently on iTunes’ Top 10 podcast rankings. Stuff You Should Know's "beautifully, beautifully done" production has set "the audio standard," according to podcast reviewers Pod on Pod. They added that the audio quality "could not be improved" on the NPR-level production. One reviewer said of it: "It is never not fun to listen to."

Since 2014, a listener and fan, dubbed The Minister of Stats by Clark and Bryant, has maintained a spreadsheet listing all episodes with original publishing dates, run times, and fun facts. Short Stuff and Selects episodes do not contribute to the overall episode count.

== Series overview ==
Year	Average length	Longest episode	Shortest episode
Overall	41 minutes	"How LSD Works" (106 minutes)	"How Evolution in Isolation Works" (4 minutes)
2020	54 minutes	"How COVID-19 Works" (71 minutes)	"Short Stuff: Hawaiian Night Marchers" (11 minutes)
2019	54 minutes	"Guardian Angels: Behind the Red Beret" (105 minutes)	"Short Stuff: Unspent Campaign Money" (13 minutes)
2018	63 minutes	"SYSK Live: Back When Ford Pintos Were Flaming Deathtraps" (80 minutes)	"Short Stuff: Unique Snowflakes" (14 minutes)
2017	55 minutes	"SYSK Live: The DB Cooper Heist" (95 minutes)	"SYSK Selects: How Exorcism Works" (24 minutes)
2016	49 minutes	"How LSD Works" (106 minutes)	"Living Underground in Beijing" (32 minutes)
2015	46 minutes	"Live in Chicago: How Public Relations Works" (77 minutes)	"Rainbows: Delighting humanity since forever" (32 minutes)
2014	44 minutes	"How Police Interrogation Works" (67 minutes)	"How Leper Colonies Worked" (30 minutes)
2013	36 minutes	"How Dying Works" (64 minutes)	"How Alien Hand Syndrome Works" (15 minutes)
2012	37 minutes	"Why does music provoke emotion?" (64 minutes)	"What is a shotgun house?" (23 minutes)
2011	36 minutes	"What Saved the American Bison" (54 minutes)	"How Tickling Works" (21 minutes)
2010	32 minutes	"SYSK's Guatemalan Adventure, Part One" (55 minutes)	"How Scabies Work" (20 minutes)
2009	25 minutes	"The Real How Jack the Ripper Worked" (39 minutes)	"How Hypoallergenic Cats Work" (15 minutes)
2008	11 minutes	"Did the CIA test LSD on unsuspecting Americans?" (26 minutes)	"How Evolution in Isolation Works" (4 minutes)

As of 31 December 2020

== Episodes ==
=== 2017 ===
No. in series	No. in season	Title	Length	Original air date
917	1	"How Feeding Babies Works: The Breast"	71 minutes	January 3, 2017
918	2	"How Feeding Babies Works: The Bottle"	73 minutes	January 5, 2017
919	3	"What's the deal with Baby Boomers?"	52 minutes	January 10, 2017
920	4	"How Watersheds Work"	32 minutes	January 12, 2017
921	5	"Are Artificial Sweeteners Really Bad For You?"	59 minutes	January 17, 2017
922	6	"How Soylent Works"	44 minutes	January 19, 2017
923	7	"How Dictators Work"	48 minutes	January 24, 2017
924	8	"How Pacifism Works (And Could It?)"	75 minutes	January 26, 2017
925	9	"Elastics: Where God and Science Smooch"	54 minutes	January 31, 2017
926	10	"What's the future of virtual sex?"	58 minutes	February 2, 2017
927	11	"The Quinoa Revolution!"	46 minutes	February 7, 2017
928	12	"Live from San Francisco: How Malls Work"	68 minutes	February 9, 2017
929	13	"Tardigrades: Nature's Cuddly, Indestructible Microanimal"	36 minutes	February 14, 2017
930	14	"The Black Panther Party"	67 minutes	February 16, 2017
931	15	"The ins and outs of the DEATH TAX"	52 minutes	February 21, 2017
932	16	"How Famines Work"	54 minutes	February 23, 2017
933	17	"How Free Speech Works"	67 minutes	February 28, 2017
934	18	"How Optical Illusions Work"	44 minutes	March 2, 2017
935	19	"History of the Trail of Tears, Part I"	56 minutes	March 7, 2017
936	20	"History of the Trail of Tears, Part II"	46 minutes	March 9, 2017
937	21	"Pain Scales: Yeeeow!"	47 minutes	March 14, 2017
938	22	"Southerners Aren’t Lazy and Dumb, They Just Had Hookworm"	52 minutes	March 16, 2017
939	23	"Solitary Confinement: Cruel and Unusual"	51 minutes	March 21, 2017
940	24	"How the Hyperloop Will Work"	65 minutes	March 23, 2017
941	25	"How Foreign Accent Syndrome Works"	51 minutes	March 28, 2017
942	26	"The Shroud Of Turin: No Ordinary Bed Sheet"	48 minutes	March 30, 2017
943	27	"Composting: Nature's Most Interesting Process"	55 minutes	April 4, 2017
944	28	"How Empathy Works"	56 minutes	April 6, 2017
945	29	"How Supreme Court Nominations Work"	49 minutes	April 11, 2017
946	30	"How Supervolcanoes Work"	34 minutes	April 13, 2017
947	31	"How Swearing Works"	52 minutes	April 20, 2017
948	32	"How the National Security Council Works"	57 minutes	April 25, 2017
949	33	"How Multiple Sclerosis Works"	46 minutes	April 27, 2017
950	34	"Some Nutso Fan Theories"	56 minutes	May 4, 2017
951	35	"How Itching Works"	48 minutes	May 9, 2017
952	36	"How Charismatic Megafauna Work"	50 minutes	May 11, 2017
953	37	"How Champagne Works"	63 minutes	May 16, 2017
954	38	"How the Aurora Borealis and Aurora Australis Work"	46 minutes	May 18, 2017
955	39	"Is a head transplant really a thing?"	47 minutes	May 23, 2017
956	40	"How Schoolhouse Rock Rocked: Featuring Bob Nastanovich of Pavement"	65 minutes	May 25, 2017
957	41	"Are Election Laws Designed to Suppress Voting?"	73 minutes	May 30, 2017
958	42	"The Stories Behind A Few Food Fads"	51 minutes	June 1, 2017
959	43	"How Coelacanths Work"	44 minutes	June 6, 2017
960	44	"Why Are Whale Strandings Still a Mystery?"	47 minutes	June 8, 2017
961	45	"How the Beagle Brigade Works"	53 minutes	June 13, 2017
962	46	"What was Camp X?"	53 minutes	June 15, 2017
963	47	"How Seed Banks Work"	55 minutes	June 20, 2017
964	48	"How Ketchup Works"	57 minutes	June 22, 2017
965	49	"Remembering Stonewall"	59 minutes	June 27, 2017
966	50	"How Standardized Patients Work"	54 minutes	June 29, 2017
967	51	"What exactly is stoicism?"	61 minutes	July 4, 2017
968	52	"Josh and Chuck's List of Horror Movies that Changed the Genre"	64 minutes	July 6, 2017
969	53	"Why is There a Battle Over Net Neutrality?"	65 minutes	July 11, 2017
970	54	"How Fever Dreams Work"	40 minutes	July 13, 2017
971	55	"Sunburn, Suntans and Sunscreen"	52 minutes	July 18, 2017
972	56	"All We Know About Guessing"	61 minute	July 20, 2017
973	57	"What is Ghost Fishing?"	48 minutes	July 25, 2017
974	58	"A Dry Look at Toilet Paper"	56 minutes	July 27, 2017
975	59	"How Public Broadcasting Works"	60 minutes	August 1, 2017
976	60	"Who Committed the 1912 Villisca Ax Murders?"	49 minutes	August 3, 2017
977	61	"Do motivational speakers motivate people?"	54 minutes	August 8, 2017
978	62	"How Bioarchaeology Works"	58 minutes	August 10, 2017
979	63	"How Stuttering Works"	54 minutes	August 15, 2017
980	64	"What's the deal with accents?"	60 minutes	August 17, 2017
981	65	"Is the Uncanny Valley Real?"	71 minutes	August 22, 2017
982	66	"How Personality Tests Work"	60 minutes	August 24, 2017
983	67	"A Lip-Smacking Look at Barbecue"	54 minutes	August 29, 2017
984	68	"How Satanism Works"	56 minutes	August 31, 2017
985	69	"The Baffling Case of the Body On Somerton Beach"	68 minutes	September 5, 2017
986	70	"Are crickets the future of food?"	47 minutes	September 7, 2017
987	71	"How Psychopaths Work"	51 minutes	September 12, 2017
988	72	"How the Secret Service Works"	57 minutes	September 14, 2017
989	73	"How Frogs Work"	54 minutes	September 19, 2017
990	74	"A Nostalgic Look at Crayons"	56 minutes	September 21, 2017
991	75	"How FOIA Works"	54 minutes	September 26, 2017
992	76	"How Nude Beaches Work"	49 minutes	September 28, 2017
993	77	"How Police Body Cameras Work"	48 minutes	October 3, 2017
994	78	"How Giraffes Work"	57 minutes	October 5, 2017
995	79	"How the Rolling Jubilee Works"	50 minutes	October 10, 2017
996	80	"How Buildering Works"	50 minutes	October 12, 2017
997	81	"SYSK Live: The DB Cooper Heist"	95 minutes	October 17, 2017
998	82	"How Internships Work"	42 minutes	October 19, 2017
999	83	"Episode 999: The Simpsons Spectacular Part I"	54 minutes	October 24, 2017
1000	84	"Episode 1,000: The Simpsons Spectacular Part II"	64 minutes	October 26, 2017
1001	85	"SYSK's 2017 Super Spooktacular!"	58 minutes	October 31, 2017
1002	86	"How Global Warming Works"	63 minutes	November 2, 2017
1003	87	"Movie Crush: Janet Varney on Tron"	54 minutes	November 3, 2017
1004	88	"Movie Crush: Tig Notaro on Mask"	75 minutes	November 3, 2017
1005	89	"How Restaurant Health Inspections Work"	58 minutes	November 7, 2017
1006	90	"What's permaculture all about?"	55 minutes	November 9, 2017
1007	91	"How the Flu Works"	54 minutes	November 14, 2017
1008	92	"Can movies be cursed?"	56 minutes	November 16, 2017
1009	93	"Bath Salts: Steer Clear"	44 minutes	November 21, 2017
1010	94	"What is nuclear forensics?"	51 minutes	November 23, 2017
1011	95	"How Toy Testing Works"	50 minutes	November 28, 2017
1012	96	"Cake: So Great. So, So Great"	73 minutes	November 30, 2017
1013	97	"How Vomit Phobia Works"	33 minutes	December 5, 2017
1014	98	"How Flight Attendants Work"	44 minutes	December 7, 2017
1015	99	"The Deal With Doulas"	41 minutes	December 12, 2017
1016	100	"How the Globe of Death Works"	46 minutes	December 14, 2017
1017	101	"Narcissism: But what about me?"	63 minutes	December 19, 2017
1018	102	"The 2017 SYSK Christmas Extravaganza!"	55 minutes	December 21, 2017
1019	103	"How the Seven Wonders of the Ancient World Works, Part I"	46 minutes	December 26, 2017
1020	104	"How the Seven Wonders of the Ancient World Works, Part II"	49 minutes	December 28, 2017

=== 2018 ===
No. in series	No. in season	Title	Length	Original air date
1021	1	"How Orchids Work"	56 minutes	January 2, 2018
1022	2	"How Impeachment Works"	57 minutes	January 4, 2018
1023	3	"The Mystery of the Mary Celeste"	67 minutes	January 9, 2018
1024	4	"What is an invasive species?"	56 minutes	January 11, 2018
1025	5	"How Removing Public Monuments Work"	52 minutes	January 16, 2018
1026	6	"How Hang Gliding Works"	47 minutes	January 18, 2018
1027	7	"How Hoarding Works"	67 minutes	January 23, 2018
1028	8	"The Manson Family Murders Part I"	51 minutes	January 25, 2018
1029	9	"The Manson Family Murders Part II"	46 minutes	January 30, 2018
1030	10	"Marijuana Vs. Alcohol: Which Is Worse For You?"	57 minutes	February 1, 2018
1031	11	"What is a Mold-A-Rama?"	44 minutes	February 6, 2018
1032	12	"The Mystery of The Grand Canyon Newlyweds"	57 minutes	February 8, 2018
1033	13	"How Pompeii Worked"	55 minutes	February 13, 2018
1034	14	"The Harriet Tubman Story"	52 minutes	February 15, 2018
1035	15	"Are Feral Children Real?"	47 minutes	February 20, 2018
1036	16	"Rosa Parks: Agent of Change"	56 minutes	February 22, 2018
1037	17	"Knife Throwing: Super Cool"	47 minutes	February 27, 2018
1038	18	"SYSK Live: Back When Ford Pintos Were Flaming Deathtraps"	80 minutes	March 1, 2018
1039	19	"The Strange Story of Sea Monkeys"	57 minutes	March 6, 2018
1040	20	"Why Do People Believe In Faith Healing?"	58 minutes	March 8, 2018
1041	21	"The Huggable, Lovable Walrus"	55 minutes	March 13, 2018
1042	22	"Is Vaping Really Bad For You?"	46 minutes	March 15, 2018
1043	23	"How the New England Vampire Panics Worked"	52 minutes	March 20, 2018
1044	24	"How the Framingham Heart Study Works"	56 minutes	March 22, 2018
1045	25	"How Meals on Wheels Works"	53 minutes	March 27, 2018
1046	26	"What are false positives?"	49 minutes	March 29, 2018
1047	27	"When Words Take on New Meanings"	62 minutes	April 3, 2018
1048	28	"Project Azorian: The CIA's Super 70s Mission To Steal A Sunken Soviet Sub"	56 minutes	April 5, 2018
1049	29	"Why Landmines Are The Deadliest Legacy Of War"	56 minutes	April 10, 2018
1050	30	"How Paramedics Work"	53 minutes	April 12, 2018
1051	31	"The Unabomber: Misguided to say the least"	51 minutes	April 17, 2018
1052	32	"Two Times In the 70s When People Buried Ferraris"	51 minutes	April 19, 2018
1053	33	"Emojis: A New Language? Nah."	53 minutes	April 24, 2018
1054	34	"Does Pyromania Actually Exist?"	40 minutes	April 26, 2018
1055	35	"Nepotism: When Hiring the Best Just Won't Do"	47 minutes	May 1, 2018
1056	36	"North Korea: What's the Deal?"	72 minutes	May 3, 2018
1057	37	"PT Barnum: More Complicated Than You've Heard"	63 minutes	May 8, 2018
1058	38	"How Drowning Works"	56 minutes	May 10, 2018
1059	39	"What's a quinceañera anyway?"	45 minutes	May 15, 2018
1060	40	"The Collar Bomb Heist"	47 minutes	May 17, 2018
1061	41	"A List Of Games You Would Surely Lose to a Computer"	61 minutes	May 22, 2018
1062	42	"How Occam's Razor Works"	46 minutes	May 24, 2018
1063	43	"How Drug Courts Work"	57 minutes	May 29, 2018
1064	44	"Is the Pied Piper About a Real Historic Tragedy?"	46 minutes	May 31, 2018
1065	45	"The Max Headroom Incident"	54 minutes	June 5, 2018
1066	46	"Frida Kahlo: Painter, Icon, Genius"	52 minutes	June 7, 2018
1067	47	"How Tsunamis Work"	52 minutes	June 12, 2018
1068	48	"Skyscrapers: 'Scuse me while I kiss the sky"	57 minutes	June 14, 2018
1069	49	"How The Pill Changed the World"	50 minutes	June 19, 2018
1070	50	"Genghis Khan: Madman or Genius?"	55 minutes	June 21, 2018
1071	51	"Can Anarchism Work?"	66 minutes	June 26, 2018
1072	52	"Narwhals: Unicorns of the Sea"	41 minutes	June 28, 2018
1073	53	"How Diabetes Works"	60 minutes	July 3, 2018
1074	54	"How the Stanford Prison Experiment Worked"	51 minutes	July 5, 2018
1075	55	"The Disappearance of the Yuba County Five"	57 minutes	July 10, 2018
1076	56	"Gerrymandering: How to Stifle Democracy"	42 minutes	July 12, 2018
1077	57	"Jobs of Bygone Eras"	65 minutes	July 17, 2018
1078	58	"How Attorney-Client Privilege Works"	42 minutes	July 19, 2018
1079	59	"Recycling Update: How’s It Going?"	69 minutes	July 24, 2018
1080	60	"The Dyatlov Pass Mystery"	45 minutes	July 26, 2018
1081	61	"How the Pony Express Worked"	49 minutes	July 31, 2018
1082	62	"How the U.S. Military Draft Works"	60 minutes	August 2, 2018
1083	63	"How Search and Rescue Works"	65 minutes	August 7, 2018
1084	64	"How Attila the Hun Worked"	48 minutes	August 9, 2018
1085	65	"How Board Breaking Works"	50 minutes	August 14, 2018
1086	66	"Who is The Man of the Hole?"	42 minutes	August 16, 2018
1087	67	"Ballpoint pens? Heck yes, ballpoint pens!"	54 minutes	August 21, 2018
1088	68	"Pterosaurs: Not Flying Dinosaurs"	43 minutes	August 23, 2018
1089	69	"Why There Aren't So Many Hotel Fires Anymore"	49 minutes	August 28, 2018
1090	70	"How Elimination Diets Work"	49 minutes	August 30, 2018
1091	71	"How Police Lineups Work"	57 minutes	September 4, 2018
1092	72	"The Lava Lamp: Goes Great With Acid"	51 minutes	September 6, 2018
1093	73	"SYSK Live: How Game Shows Work"	73 minutes	September 11, 2018
1094	74	"What are think tanks all about?"	50 minutes	September 13, 2018
1095	75	"Roundabouts: The Problem Is You"	63 minutes	September 18, 2018
1096	76	"How Ranked Choice Voting Works"	48 minutes	September 20, 2018
1097	77	"What is colorblindness?"	41 minutes	September 25, 2018
1098	78	"Seriously, What Is Dark Matter?"	48 minutes	September 27, 2018
1099	79	"How the Concorde Worked"	61 minutes	October 2, 2018
1100	80	"Algae: Food, Fuel, What?"	57 minutes	October 4, 2018
1101	81	"How Marathons Work"	70 minutes	October 9, 2018
1102	82	"When inventions kill!"	49 minutes	October 11, 2018
1103	83	"Was There A Real Robin Hood?"	54 minutes	October 16, 2018
1104	84	"Waterbeds: The Sexiest Bed?"	44 minutes	October 18, 2018
1105	85	"How Epilepsy Works"	59 minutes	October 23, 2018
1106	86	"How the Amityville Horror Worked"	58 minutes	October 25, 2018
1107	87	"SYSK’s 2018 Super Spooktacular"	51 minutes	October 30, 2018
1108	88	"How Easy Bake Ovens Work"	41 minutes	November 1, 2018
1109	89	"What were war masks?"	44 minutes	November 6, 2018
1110	90	"Is yogurt a miracle food?"	51 minutes	November 8, 2018
1111	91	"Pando: Earth’s Oldest, Hugest Organism Is Trees!"	48 minutes	November 13, 2018
1112	92	"Olive Oil: Mother Nature's Gift"	66 minutes	November 15, 2018
1113	93	"Finders Keepers: Real Law"	44 minutes	November 20, 2018
1114	94	"Fire twucks! Fire twucks! (sic)"	54 minutes	November 22, 2018
1115	95	"How the Navajo Code Talkers Worked"	50 minutes	November 27, 2018
1116	96	"Adidas v. Puma: A Sibling Rivalry"	46 minutes	November 29, 2018
1117	97	"How Search and Rescue Dogs Work"	56 minutes	December 4, 2018
1118	98	"Was the PMRC censorship in disguise?"	60 minutes	December 6, 2018
1119	99	"How Ayahuasca Works"	50 minutes	December 11, 2018
1120	100	"Are good samaritan laws effective?"	51 minutes	December 13, 2018
1121	101	"Geodesic Domes: The Wave of the Future That Wasn't"	55 minutes	December 18, 2018
1122	102	"E.T.: Is It Really the Worst Video Game of All Time?"	47 minutes	December 20, 2018
1123	103	"SYSK Live Christmas Spectacular!"	75 minutes	December 25, 2018
1124	104	"Dr. Seuss: The Good, the Bad and the Ugly"	56 minutes	December 27, 2018

=== Short Stuff (2018) ===
No. in series	No. in season	Title	Length	Original air date
1	1	"Short Stuff: Grandfather Clocks"	15 minutes	October 3, 2018
2	2	"Short Stuff: William King"	15 minutes	October 10, 2018
3	3	"Short Stuff: Korean Fan Death"	17 minutes	October 17, 2018
4	4	"Short Stuff: Exploding Manholes"	16 minutes	October 24, 2018
5	5	"Short Stuff: Labor Day"	15 minutes	October 31, 2018
6	6	"Short Stuff: Vomitoria"	15 minutes	November 7, 2018
7	7	"Short Stuff: Lemonade"	16 minutes	November 14, 2018
8	8	"Short Stuff: Safety Pins"	15 minutes	November 21, 2018
9	9	"Short Stuff: iSmell"	16 minutes	November 28, 2018
10	10	"Short Stuff: Dolphin Detectors"	16 minutes	December 5, 2018
11	11	"Short Stuff: Laughing Buddha"	14 minutes	December 12, 2018
12	12	"Short Stuff: Unique Snowflakes"	14 minutes	December 19, 2018
13	13	"Short Stuff: The Brain-Bladder Connection"	16 minutes	December 26, 2018

=== 2019 ===
No. in series	No. in season	Title	Length	Original air date
1125	1	"Rockettes: Still Kicking After All These Years"	50 minutes	January 1, 2019
1126	2	"What was the Tunguska event?"	47 minutes	January 3, 2019
1127	3	"How the Spanish Flu Worked"	63 minutes	January 8, 2019
1128	4	"The Great Finger in the Wendy’s Chili Caper"	49 minutes	January 10, 2019
1129	5	"How Airbags Work"	45 minutes	January 15, 2019
1130	6	"The July 20th Plot to Assassinate Hitler"	52 minutes	January 17, 2019
1131	7	"SYSK Live: The Kellogg Brothers’ Wacky World of Health"	76 minutes	January 22, 2019
1132	8	"The Legend of Betsy Ross"	47 minutes	January 24, 2019
1133	9	"How Ping Pong Works"	62 minutes	January 29, 2019
1134	10	"How Central Park Works"	58 minutes	January 31, 2019
1135	11	"The Insidious Abuse of Stalking"	62 minutes	February 5, 2019
1136	12	"The True Story of BlacKkKlansman"	50 minutes	February 7, 2019
1137	13	"Could There Be A Loch Ness Monster?"	67 minutes	February 12, 2019
1138	14	"Elephants: The Best Animals?"	66 minutes	February 14, 2019
1139	15	"Yeti: The Asian Bigfoot"	50 minutes	February 19, 2019
1140	16	"How Galaxies Work"	51 minutes	February 21, 2019
1141	17	"The Science of Break-Ups"	65 minutes	February 26, 2019
1142	18	"Tuskegee Airmen: American Heroes"	52 minutes	February 28, 2019
1150	19	"What's the deal with ASMR?"	51 minutes	March 5, 2019
1143	20	"How Dyslexia Works"	48 minutes	March 7, 2019
1144	21	"The Case of Sacco and Vanzetti"	60 minutes	March 12, 2019
1145	22	"The Great Stink: The Stench So Bad They Gave It A Name"	40 minutes	March 14, 2019
1146	23	"Desert Survival: Josh and Chuck Save Your Tookus"	50 minutes	March 19, 2019
1147	24	"How Disgust Works"	59 minutes	March 21, 2019
1148	25	"How Druids Worked"	59 minutes	March 26, 2019
1149	26	"Etch A Sketch!"	44 minutes	March 28, 2019
1151	27	"How Rape Kits Work"	55 minutes	April 2, 2019
1152	28	"Were Nazis Drug-Fueled Crankheads?"	50 minutes	April 4, 2019
1153	29	"How Free Range Parenting Works"	56 minutes	April 9, 2019
1154	30	"How the Electric Chair Works"	65 minutes	April 11, 2019
1155	31	"How the Hoover Dam Works, Part I"	51 minutes	April 16, 2019
1156	32	"How the Hoover Dam Works, Part II"	47 minutes	April 18, 2019
1157	33	"Is birth order important?"	56 minutes	April 23, 2019
1158	34	"What Were Human Zoos?"	46 minutes	April 25, 2019
1159	35	"Michael Dillon: Trans Pioneer"	60 minutes	April 30, 2019
1160	36	"What Happens When the Government Thinks You're Dead?"	44 minutes	May 2, 2019
1161	37	"Remembering Live Aid"	57 minutes	May 7, 2019
1162	38	"Do Dietary Supplements Work?"	60 minutes	May 9, 2019
1163	39	"How Trampolines Work"	59 minutes	May 14, 2019
1164	40	"10ish Cases of Really Bad Luck"	55 minutes	May 16, 2019
1165	41	"How Crystals Work"	54 minutes	May 21, 2019
1166	42	"What was Tin Pan Alley?"	46 minutes	May 23, 2019
1167	43	"The Tylenol Murders, Part I"	50 minutes	May 28, 2019
1168	44	"The Tylenol Murders, Part II"	51 minutes	May 30, 2019
1169	45	"How Barcodes Work"	59 minutes	June 4, 2019
1170	46	"What is perfect pitch?"	48 minutes	June 6, 2019
1171	47	"What's the gig economy?"	48 minutes	June 11, 2019
1172	48	"How Area 51 Works"	56 minutes	June 13, 2019
1173	49	"How the Hygiene Hypothesis Works"	50 minutes	June 18, 2019
1174	50	"What happened to the Neanderthals?"	55 minutes	June 20, 2019
1175	51	"Planned Obsolescence: Engine of the Consumer Economy"	62 minutes	June 25, 2019
1176	52	"What is the Civil Air Patrol?"	50 minutes	June 27, 2019
1177	53	"Is photographic memory a real thing?"	50 minutes	June 2, 2019
1178	54	"How the Fairness Doctrine Worked"	58 minutes	June 4, 2019
1179	55	"Cleopatra: Ms. Understood"	56 minutes	June 9, 2019
1180	56	"How Sloths Work"	60 minutes	June 11, 2019
1181	57	"How Going to the Moon Works"	59 minutes	June 16, 2019
1182	58	"Sand Dunes: They Are What You Think They Are"	47 minutes	June 18, 2019
1183	59	"MOVE: Or When the Philly Police Dropped a Bomb on a Residential Neighborhood"	57 minutes	June 23, 2019
1184	60	"How Eyewitness Testimony Works(?)"	61 minutes	June 25, 2019
1185	61	"Will Deepfakes Ruin the World?"	49 minutes	April 30, 2019
1186	62	"What Were the BONE WARS?"	58 minutes	August 1, 2019
1187	63	"Iran-Contra Affair: Shady in the 80s, Part 1"	51 minutes	August 6, 2019
1188	64	"Iran-Contra Affair: Shady in the 80s, Part 2"	49 minutes	August 8, 2019
1189	65	"Solar Power: The Future or What?"	66 minutes	August 13, 2019
1190	66	"How Peyote Works"	46 minutes	August 15, 2019
1191	67	"Nuclear Semiotics: How to Talk to Future Humans"	59 minutes	August 20, 2019
1192	68	"How Ventriloquism Works"	54 minutes	August 22, 2019
1193	69	"A Brief Overview of Punk Rock"	57 minutes	August 27, 2019
1194	70	"The Rubik's Cube Episode"	54 minutes	August 29, 2019
1195	71	"Ed Gein: The Serial Killer's Serial Killer"	52 minutes	September 3, 2019
1196	72	"What's the deal with MSG?"	61 minutes	September 5, 2019
1197	73	"How Government Shutdowns Work"	58 minutes	September 10, 2019
1198	74	"Special Effects: A Short History"	60 minutes	September 12, 2019
1199	75	"The Skinny on Lyme Disease"	53 minutes	September 17, 2019
1200	76	"How the US Interstate System Works"	66 minutes	September 19, 2019
1201	77	"We Are Running Out of Sand and That Actually Matters"	51 minutes	September 24, 2019
1202	78	"What are paraphilias?"	57 minutes	September 26, 2019
1203	79	"Guardian Angels: Behind the Red Beret"	105 minutes	October 1, 2019
1204	80	"What were the Freedom Schools?"	51 minutes	October 3, 2019
1205	81	"How Environmental Psychology Works"	54 minutes	October 8, 2019
1206	82	"The Ins and Outs of Beekeeping"	69 minutes	October 10, 2019
1207	83	"How Project Blue Book Worked, Pt I"	46 minutes	October 15, 2019
1208	84	"How Project Blue Book Worked, Pt II"	49 minutes	October 17, 2019
1209	85	"What's the deal with subpoenas?"	56 minutes	October 22, 2019
1210	86	"How Historic Districts Work"	50 minutes	October 24, 2019
1211	87	"Where Did Trick-Or-Treating Come From?"	56 minutes	October 29, 2019
1212	88	"SYSK’s Scare Your Socks Off Halloween Spooktacular 2019"	40 minutes	October 31, 2019
1213	89	"How Ironman Triathlons Work"	61 minutes	November 6, 2019
1214	90	"Cockney Rhyming Slang: Beautiful Gibberish"	48 minutes	November 7, 2019
1215	91	"Augmented Reality: Coming Soon?"	63 minutes	November 12, 2019
1216	92	"NYC Water: An Engineering Marvel"	53 minutes	November 14, 2019
1217	93	"The Murder Mystery of Ötzi the Iceman"	58 minutes	November 19, 2019
1218	94	"What Makes a Must-Have Christmas Toy?"	54 minutes	November 21, 2019
1219	95	"How Carbon-14 Dating Works"	61 minutes	November 26, 2019
1220	96	"How Conversion Therapy Doesn't Work"	69 minutes	November 28, 2019
1221	97	"Did Climate Cause the Collapse of the Maya?"	49 minutes	December 3, 2019
1222	98	"What's a gap year anyway?"	57 minutes	December 5, 2019
1223	99	"Everything You Ever Wanted to Know About Gin"	54 minutes	December 10, 2019
1224	100	"How Anorexia and Bulimia Work"	65 minutes	December 12, 2019
1225	101	"MC Escher and His Trippy Art"	62 minutes	December 17, 2019
1226	102	"Cave Diving: Totally Nuts"	56 minutes	December 19, 2019
1227	103	"The SYSK Holiday Spectacular"	44 minutes	December 24, 2019
1228	104	"SYSK Live: Andre the Giant"	69 minutes	December 26, 2019
1229	105	"Are broken arrows a problem?"	54 minutes	December 31, 2019

=== Short Stuff (2019) ===
No. in series	No. in season	Title	Length	Original air date
14	1	"Short Stuff: Khipu"	17 minutes	January 2, 2019
15	2	"Short Stuff: How Often Do You Need To Change Your Oil?"	16 minutes	January 9, 2019
16	3	"Short Stuff: Olestra"	13 minutes	January 16, 2019
17	4	"Short Stuff: Johnny Appleseed"	14 minutes	January 30, 2019
18	5	"Short Stuff: Ellen Richards"	13 minutes	February 6, 2019
19	6	"Short Stuff: War of Jenkins' Ear"	14 minutes	February 13, 2019
20	7	"Short Stuff: Turbulence"	13 minutes	February 20, 2019
21	8	"Short Stuff: Black Loyalists"	14 minutes	February 27, 2019
22	9	"Short Stuff: Wigs in English Court"	14 minutes	March 6, 2019
23	10	"Short Stuff: Bedbugs"	14 minutes	March 13, 2019
24	11	"Short Stuff: The Sandman"	14 minutes	March 20, 2019
25	12	"Short Stuff: When Elvis Met Nixon"	16 minutes	March 27, 2019
26	13	"Short Stuff: Unspent Campaign Money"	13 minutes	April 3, 2019
27	14	"Short Stuff: Lake Peigneur"	15 minutes	April 10, 2019
28	15	"Short Stuff: Emu Wars"	14 minutes	April 17, 2019
29	16	"Short Stuff: Fear of Public Speaking"	14 minutes	April 24, 2019
30	17	"Short Stuff: The Number 23"	15 minutes	May 1, 2019
31	18	"Short Stuff: Nicknames"	15 minutes	May 8, 2019
32	19	"Short Stuff: Honorary Degrees"	15 minutes	May 15, 2019
33	20	"Short Stuff: James Polk, Disinterred"	14 minutes	May 22, 2019
34	21	"Short Stuff: Look-Alike Old Couples"	15 minutes	May 29, 2019
35	22	"Short Stuff: Robert Johnson and the Devil"	14 minutes	June 5, 2019
36	23	"Short Stuff: Smoke Signals"	16 minutes	June 12, 2019
37	24	"Short Stuff: Emperor Norton"	16 minutes	June 19, 2019
38	25	"Short Stuff: Prison Food"	13 minutes	June 26, 2019
39	26	"Short Stuff: Mitsuye Endo"	13 minutes	July 3, 2019
40	27	"Short Stuff: The Coconut Cult"	18 minutes	July 10, 2019
41	28	"Short Stuff: Yellow Rain"	14 minutes	July 17, 2019
42	29	"Short Stuff: Aristides de Sousa Mendes"	14 minutes	July 24, 2019
43	30	"Short Stuff: The Man Who Didn’t Eat for a Year"	14 minutes	July 31, 2019
44	31	"Short Stuff: Time Zones"	15 minutes	August 7, 2019
45	32	"Short Stuff: Petrichor"	14 minutes	August 14, 2019
46	33	"Short Stuff: Horseshoe Crab Blood"	15 minutes	August 21, 2019
47	34	"Short Stuff: Dead Bodies and Airline Codes"	15 minutes	August 28, 2019
48	35	"Short Stuff: Barbed Wire"	15 minutes	September 4, 2019
49	36	"Short Stuff: Papasan Chairs"	15 minutes	September 11, 2019
50	37	"Short Stuff: Scurvy"	15 minutes	September 18, 2019
51	38	"Short Stuff: Dare Stones"	17 minutes	September 25, 2019
52	39	"Short Stuff: Fish n' Chips"	15 minutes	October 2, 2019
53	40	"Short Stuff: The Devil's Den"	15 minutes	October 9, 2019
54	41	"Short Stuff: The Disappearance of Ambrose Bierce"	14 minutes	October 16, 2019
55	42	"Short Stuff: The Toxic Death of Gloria Ramirez"	14 minutes	October 23, 2019
56	43	"Short Stuff: Our Shortie Halloween Spooktacular"	14 minutes	October 30, 2019
57	44	"Short Stuff: The History of Paternity Testing"	13 minutes	November 6, 2019
58	45	"Short Stuff: The Conch Republic"	16 minutes	November 13, 2019
59	46	"Short Stuff: Backyard Burials"	15 minutes	November 20, 2019
60	47	"Short Stuff: Niagara Falls Dewatered"	17 minutes	November 27, 2019
61	48	"Short Stuff: Macadamia Nuts"	14 minutes	December 4, 2019
62	49	"Short Stuff: Whisky or Bourbon?"	15 minutes	December 11, 2019
63	50	"Short Stuff: Obituaries"	15 minutes	December 18, 2019
64	51	"Short Stuff: The Santa Claus Association"	15 minutes	December 25, 2019

=== 2020 ===
No. in series	No. in season	Title	Length	Original air date
1230	1	"How Safecracking Works"	63 minutes	January 2, 2020
1231	2	"The Disappearance of Flight MH370, Part I"	46 minutes	January 7, 2020
1232	3	"The Disappearance of Flight MH370, Part II"	50 minutes	January 9, 2020
1233	4	"Transdermal Implants: Body Art or Nightmare Fuel?"	58 minutes	January 14, 2020
1234	5	"The Tulsa 'Race Riots'"	51 minutes	January 16, 2020
1235	6	"Why Postal Employees Go Postal"	53 minutes	January 21, 2020
1236	7	"Barefoot Running: The Best Podcast Episode in History"	47 minutes	January 23, 2020
1237	8	"Amazing Animal Stories!"	42 minutes	January 28, 2020
1238	9	"Who were the Buffalo Soldiers?"	56 minutes	January 30, 2020
1239	10	"How AI Facial Recognition Works"	60 minutes	February 4, 2020
1240	11	"Why are Pentecostals growing so rapidly?"	46 minutes	February 6, 2020
1241	12	"Optogenetics: Controlling Your Genes with Light"	51 minutes	February 11, 2020
1242	13	"911 Is Not a Joke"	59 minutes	February 13, 2020
1243	14	"The Unsolved Indiana Dunes Disappearances"	46 minutes	February 18, 2020
1244	15	"Birthmarks: Probably Not the Mark of the Devil"	55 minutes	February 20, 2020
1245	16	"What's the deal with indigo?"	51 minutes	February 25, 2020
1246	17	"Sammy Davis Jr: National Treasure"	61 minutes	February 27, 2020
1247	18	"How Morphic Fields Work?"	58 minutes	March 3, 2020
1248	19	"Mardi Gras! One month late"	51 minutes	March 5, 2020
1249	20	"How Coyotes Work"	50 minutes	March 10, 2020
1250	21	"How Ice Climbing Works"	62 minutes	March 12, 2020
1251	22	"Chopsticks > Forks"	56 minutes	March 17, 2020
1252	23	"What was the Falkland Islands War all about anyway?"	57 minutes	March 19, 2020
1253	24	"Could A Robot Tax Win the War on Poverty?"	59 minutes	March 24, 2020
1254	25	"How COVID-19 Works"	71 minutes	March 26, 2020
1255	26	"How Dog Training Works"	50 minutes	March 31, 2020
1256	27	"Student Loans: UGH!"	61 minutes	April 2, 2020
1257	28	"The Legends of Lost Nazi Gold"	51 minutes	April 7, 2020
1258	29	"Dr. Elizabeth Blackwell, Feminist Physician"	54 minutes	April 9, 2020
1259	30	"Bidets: Now More Than Ever"	52 minutes	April 14, 2020
1260	31	"How Wastewater Treatment Works"	63 minutes	April 16, 2020
1261	32	"The Soul Train Episode"	51 minutes	April 21, 2020
1262	33	"How the Voyager Golden Records Work"	69 minutes	April 23, 2020
1263	34	"How Existential Risks Work"	60 minutes	April 28, 2020
1264	35	"Agatha Christie: Queen of the Murder Mystery"	58 minutes	April 30, 2020
1265	36	"I'm Spartacus!"	58 minutes	May 5, 2020
1266	37	"Zippers: Humans’ Greatest Invention? No, But Still Good"	59 minutes	May 7, 2020
1267	38	"How Herd Immunity Works"	68 minutes	May 12, 2020
1268	39	"How Peanut Butter Works"	61 minutes	May 14, 2020
1269	40	"How Spiritualism Works"	66 minutes	May 19, 2020
1270	41	"How Bras Work"	57 minutes	May 21, 2020
1271	42	"Hummingbirds: Ornery Helicopters of the Animal Kingdom"	51 minutes	May 26, 2020
1272	43	"How Narcolepsy Works"	57 minutes	May 28, 2020
1273	44	"Heroin: The Drug"	57 minutes	June 2, 2020
1274	45	"The Massacre at Tiananmen Square"	67 minutes	June 4, 2020
1275	46	"How Project Star Gate Worked"	58 minutes	June 9, 2020
1276	47	"Can You Eat A Tapeworm To Lose Weight?"	45 minutes	June 11, 2020
1277	48	"The War on Fat: The Seven Countries Study"	53 minutes	June 16, 2020
1278	49	"The Manhattan Grid"	51 minutes	June 18, 2020
1279	50	"How Ultrasound Works"	54 minutes	June 23, 2020
1280	51	"Matcha: That Ain't Just Tea"	51 minutes	June 25, 2020
1281	52	"Bruxism: Grinding Your Teeth Is the Pits"	54 minutes	June 30, 2020
1282	53	"Oh Yes, How Soil Works"	61 minutes	July 2, 2020
1283	54	"What was the KGB?"	55 minutes	July 7, 2020
1284	55	"Essential Oils: Nature's Cure?"	60 minutes	July 9, 2020
1285	56	"Flagpole Sitting: A Real Fad"	56 minutes	July 14, 2020
1286	57	"Robber Barons!"	69 minutes	July 16, 2020
1287	58	"How We Almost Got Rid of Polio"	51 minutes	July 21, 2020
1288	59	"Everything You Ever Wanted to Know About Mobile Phones"	62 minutes	July 23, 2020
1289	60	"How Hurricanes Work"	58 minutes	July 28, 2020
1290	61	"How Soap Works"	54 minutes	July 30, 2020
1291	62	"Wasps: Not as cute as bees"	52 minutes	August 4, 2020
1292	63	"How Miniature Golf Works"	53 minutes	August 6, 2020
1293	64	"Pirate Radio: Mavericks on the High Seas"	54 minutes	August 11, 2020
1294	65	"Olympic Torches: Remember Those?"	49 minutes	August 13, 2020
1295	66	"How Anti-Dieting Works"	52 minutes	August 18, 2020
1296	67	"1-800-PODCAST"	47 minutes	August 20, 2020
1297	68	"How Sneezing Works"	54 minutes	August 25, 2020
1298	69	"Blacksmiths? You got that right!"	55 minutes	August 27, 2020
1299	70	"How the Escape from Alcatraz Worked"	60 minutes	September 1, 2020
1300	71	"The Disturbing Disappearance of Tara Calico"	46 minutes	September 3, 2020
1301	72	"Frances Perkins: Influential and Unknown"	46 minutes	September 8, 2020
1302	73	"Wetlands! Wetlands! Wetlands!"	50 minutes	September 10, 2020
1303	74	"Origami: Folding Goodness"	52 minutes	September 15, 2020
1304	75	"How Election Polling Works and Doesn't Work"	52 minutes	September 17, 2020
1305	76	"How Sweepstakes Work"	56 minutes	September 22, 2020
1306	77	"At Long Last: Hawaiian Overthrow Episode"	56 minutes	September 24, 2020
1307	78	"Conjugal Visits: Not exactly what you think"	51 minutes	September 29, 2020
1308	79	"Fallout Shelters: Probably Useless (Let’s Never Find Out)"	52 minutes	October 1, 2020
1309	80	"What's the deal with swing states?"	52 minutes	October 6, 2020
1310	81	"Printing press? Big deal!"	59 minutes	October 8, 2020
1311	82	"Wind Tunnels: More Important Than You Realize"	50 minutes	October 13, 2020
1312	83	"Porcupines: Little Stabby Cutie Pies"	45 minutes	October 15, 2020
1313	84	"10 Voter Suppression Methods"	52 minutes	October 20, 2020
1314	85	"Beavers: Tail Slapping Fun"	46 minutes	October 22, 2020
1315	86	"A History of Nursing Homes"	57 minutes	October 27, 2020
1316	87	"SYSK’s Scare Your Pants Off (and Back On) Halloween Spooktacular"	41 minutes	October 29, 2020
1317	88	"The Amazing Roberto Clemente"	50 minutes	November 3, 2020
1318	89	"All the Gold In Fort Knox: Meh"	56 minutes	November 5, 2020
1319	90	"The Bay of Pigs Disaster"	54 minutes	November 10, 2020
1320	91	"How Macy's Thanksgiving Parade Works"	52 minutes	November 12, 2020
1321	92	"How Pain Works"	57 minutes	November 17, 2020
1322	93	"The Great War of the Worlds Panic Myth"	51 minutes	November 19, 2020
1323	94	"Patty Hearst: Brainwashed or Bandit?"	60 minutes	November 24, 2020
1324	95	"Gobble Gobble: Turkeys!"	51 minutes	November 26, 2020
1325	96	"Cabbage Patch Kids: Must-Have Toy of the Century"	54 minutes	December 1, 2020
1326	97	"John Lennon and the FBI"	47 minutes	December 3, 2020
1327	98	"How Class Action Lawsuits Work"	54 minutes	December 8, 2020
1328	99	"The Taliesin Massacre"	47 minutes	December 10, 2020
1329	100	"Joseph Merrick, aka "The Elephant Man""	49 minutes	December 15, 2020
1330	101	"Aspirin: The Wonder Drug"	52 minutes	December 17, 2020
1331	102	"How Buffets Work"	62 minutes	December 22, 2020
1332	103	"The SYSK 2020 Holly Jolly Extravaganza!"	42 minutes	December 24, 2020
1333	104	"Theremins: World's First Electronic Music"	56 minutes	December 29, 2020
1334	105	"La Dame de Fer (Eiffel Tower)"	53 minutes	December 31, 2020

=== Short Stuff (2020) ===
No. in series	No. in season	Title	Length	Original air date
65	1	"Short Stuff: Why Does Time Speed Up As You Age?"	16 minutes	January 1, 2020
66	2	"Short Stuff: Corduroy"	15 minutes	January 8, 2020
67	3	"Short Stuff: The Mona Lisa"	15 minutes	January 15, 2020
68	4	"Short Stuff: Byford Dolphin Incident"	15 minutes	January 22, 2020
69	5	"Short Stuff: The O.K. Corral"	14 minutes	January 29, 2020
70	6	"Short Stuff: The Iowa Caucus"	16 minutes	February 5, 2020
71	7	"Short Stuff: Body Under The Bed"	13 minutes	February 12, 2020
72	8	"Short Stuff: Mexican Jumping Beans"	14 minutes	February 19, 2020
73	9	"Short Stuff: Hawaiian Night Marchers"	11 minutes	February 26, 2020
74	10	"Short Stuff: Exclamation Points!"	15 minutes	March 4, 2020
75	11	"Short Stuff: Teresita Basa"	15 minutes	March 11, 2020
76	12	"Short Stuff: The Pledge of Allegiance"	15 minutes	March 18, 2020
77	13	"Short Stuff: Dagen H"	14 minutes	March 25, 2020
78	14	"Short Stuff: 666"	14 minutes	April 1, 2020
79	15	"Short Stuff: AAirpass"	16 minutes	April 8, 2020
80	16	"Short Stuff: Turning Down the Radio When You're Lost"	15 minutes	April 15, 2020
81	17	"Short Stuff: The NY Times Crossword"	15 minutes	April 22, 2020
82	18	"Short Stuff: Mullets: 'Nuff Said"	14 minutes	April 29, 2020
83	19	"Short Stuff: Gibtown: Sideshow Central"	15 minutes	May 6, 2020
84	20	"Short Stuff: Charley Horse"	13 minutes	May 13, 2020
85	21	"Short Stuff: Mary Had A Little Lamb"	15 minutes	May 20, 2020
86	22	"Short Stuff: Lawn Darts"	14 minutes	May 27, 2020
87	23	"Short Stuff: Disappearing Dirty Dancing Lake"	13 minutes	June 3, 2020
88	24	"Short Stuff: Foie Gras"	14 minutes	June 10, 2020
89	25	"Short Stuff: Haint Blue"	12 minutes	June 17, 2020
90	26	"Short Stuff: Nouns of assemblage... assemble!"	12 minutes	June 24, 2020
91	27	"Short Stuff: The Science of Funny Words"	15 minutes	July 1, 2020
92	28	"Short Stuff: The @ Symbol"	16 minutes	July 8, 2020
93	29	"Short Stuff: Centralia Coal Fire"	16 minutes	July 15, 2020
94	30	"Short Stuff: The Death of Billy the Kid"	17 minutes	July 22, 2020
95	31	"Short Stuff: Habsburg Jaw"	14 minutes	July 29, 2020
96	32	"Short Stuff: Jigsaw Puzzles"	16 minutes	August 5, 2020
97	33	"Short Stuff: The Return of Bill Gates!"	31 minutes	August 12, 2020
98	34	"Short Stuff: The Great American Coin Shortage of 2020"	14 minutes	August 19, 2020
99	35	"Short Stuff: Carrots and Your Eyes"	14 minutes	August 26, 2020
100	36	"Short Stuff: More Phrase Origins"	14 minutes	September 2, 2020
101	37	"Short Stuff: Streisand Effect"	16 minutes	September 9, 2020
102	38	"Short Stuff: Black Cowboys"	15 minutes	September 16, 2020
103	39	"Short Stuff: Petticoat Rulers"	13 minutes	September 23, 2020
104	40	"Short Stuff: That's A Head Scratcher"	12 minutes	September 30, 2020
105	41	"Short Stuff: Lying in State"	12 minutes	October 7, 2020
106	42	"Short Stuff: What is Latinx anyway?"	13 minutes	October 14, 2020
107	43	"Short Stuff: Haunted Real Estate"	13 minutes	October 21, 2020
108	44	"Short Stuff: Poe Toaster"	15 minutes	April 28, 2020
109	45	"Short Stuff: Fruit Flies, Why?"	12 minutes	November 4, 2020
110	46	"Short Stuff: Plastic Pink Flamingos"	13 minutes	November 11, 2020
111	47	"Short Stuff: Squirrel Nuts"	12 minutes	November 18, 2020
112	48	"Short Stuff: How Eyes In a Painting Follow You"	12 minutes	November 25, 2020
113	49	"Short Stuff: Pimento Cheese!"	15 minutes	December 2, 2020
114	50	"Short Stuff: Cramming"	14 minutes	December 9, 2020
115	51	"Short Stuff: Modern Funerals"	13 minutes	December 16, 2020
116	52	"Short Stuff: Chinese Food on Christmas"	13 minutes	December 23, 2020
117	53	"Short Stuff: Ig-pay Atin-lay (Sorry)"	13 minutes	December 30, 2020

=== 2021 ===
No. in series	No. in season	Title	Length	Original air date
1335	1	"Space Weather - What's That?!"	54 minutes	January 5, 2021
1336	2	"The Wright Brothers"	69 minutes	January 7, 2021
1337	3	"Hell! Hell! Hell!"	62 minutes	January 12, 2021
1338	4	"The Science of Cute"	58 minutes	January 14, 2021
1339	5	"What does a tire company know about food?"	51 minutes	January 19, 2021
1340	6	"Finding the Fenn Treasure"	54 minutes	January 21, 2021
1341	7	"The KKK: Loathsome Cosplay Rednecks"	62 minutes	January 26, 2021
1342	8	"How Hydropower Works"	56 minutes	January 28, 2021
1343	9	"How Groundhog Day Works"	55 minutes	February 2, 2021
1344	10	"The NAACP"	50 minutes	February 4, 2021
1345	11	"Sacagawea: Impressive Teen"	53 minutes	February 9, 2021
1346	12	"How Housing Discrimination Works"	59 minutes	February 11, 2021
1347	13	"The Disappearance of Lars Mittank"	48 minutes	February 16, 2021
1348	14	"How Blue Holes Work"	42 minutes	February 18, 2021
1349	15	"What Will Farming 4.0 Look Like?"	51 minutes	February 23, 2021
1350	16	"How Bruce Lee Worked"	56 minutes	February 25, 2021
1351	17	"Is the Free Radical Theory of Aging Wrong?"	56 minutes	March 2, 2021
1352	18	"Why is the Equal Rights Amendment still not ratified?"	54 minutes	March 4, 2021
1353	19	"Dragons: As Real as Mermaids"	45 minutes	March 9, 2021
1354	20	"Karaoke: Tuesday Night Fever"	59 minutes	March 11, 2021
1355	21	"The Parrot Episode"	56 minutes	March 16, 2021
1356	22	"The Texas City Disaster of 1947"	46 minutes	March 18, 2021
1357	23	"What is biophilic design?"	56 minutes	March 23, 2021
1358	24	"Space Junk, Ahoy!"	55 minutes	March 25, 2021
1359	25	"How the Titanic Worked: Part One"	53 minutes	March 30, 2021
1360	26	"How the Titanic Worked: Part Two"	55 minutes	April 1, 2021
1361	27	"Havana Syndrome: ¿Qué Diablos?"	48 minutes	April 6, 2021
1362	28	"Muzak: Easy Listening Goodness"	58 minutes	April 8, 2021
1363	29	"How the Electrical Grid Works"	64 minutes	April 13, 2021
1364	30	"Hair Loss: The Pits"	63 minutes	April 15, 2021
1365	31	"Mechanical Bulls!"	52 minutes	April 20, 2021
1366	32	"How Stamp Collecting Works"	61 minutes	April 22, 2021
1367	33	"Truffles: Underground Treasures"	46 minutes	April 27, 2021
1368	34	"How Corporate Taxes Work"	55 minutes	April 29, 2021
1369	35	"The Appendix: No Respect"	49 minutes	May 4, 2021
1370	36	"How Uranium Mining Works"	56 minutes	May 6, 2021
1371	37	"The Ivy League"	55 minutes	May 11, 2021
1372	38	"How Monster Trucks Work"	53 minutes	May 13, 2021
1373	39	"The Cleveland Torso Murders"	54 minutes	May 18, 2021
1374	40	"Girl Scouts: More than cookie sellers"	56 minutes	May 20, 2021
1375	41	"How Cleft Lips and Palates Work"	46 minutes	May 25, 2021
1376	42	"Night Trap: The Video Game Failure that Changed the Industry"	47 minutes	May 27, 2021
1377	43	"What Causes Inflation?"	53 minutes	June 1, 2021
1378	44	"John Muir: Outdoor Enthusiast"	48 minutes	June 3, 2021
1379	45	"Slime Mold: 0% Mold, 100% Amazing"	55 minutes	June 8, 2021
1380	46	"POGs: The 90s in a Bottle Cap"	55 minutes	June 10, 2021
1381	47	"Seven - No, Wait, Five - Mysteries of the Art World"	52 minutes	June 15, 2021
1382	48	"How Venus Works"	46 minutes	June 17, 2021
1383	49	"The Mystery of Damascus Steel"	42 minutes	June 22, 2021
1384	50	"How Faraday Cages Work"	48 minutes	June 24, 2021
1385	51	"Poison Control Centers: A Good Thing"	56 minutes	June 29, 2021
1386	52	"The Grand Ole Opry Cast"	43 minutes	July 1, 2021
1387	53	"The Sad Story of William James Sidis"	46 minutes	July 6, 2021

=== Short Stuff (2021) ===
No. in series	No. in season	Title	Length	Original air date
118	1	"Short Stuff: Is It Theater or Theatre?"	12 minutes	January 6, 2021
119	2	"Short Stuff: Silverfish"	10 minutes	January 13, 2021
120	3	"Short Stuff: Necco"	13 minutes	January 20, 2021
121	4	"Short Stuff: Vantablack"	13 minutes	January 27, 2021
122	5	"Short Stuff: Balloonfest"	14 minutes	February 3, 2021
123	6	"Short Stuff: How California Got Its Name"	13 minutes	February 10, 2021
124	7	"Short Stuff: Freedom House Ambulance Services"	17 minutes	February 17, 2021
125	8	"Short Stuff: The Body in the Cylinder"	15 minutes	February 24, 2021
126	9	"Short Stuff: Dog Suicide Bridge"	13 minutes	March 3, 2021
127	10	"Short Stuff: Tooth Fairy: Not Real"	13 minutes	March 10, 2021
128	11	"Short Stuff: Brazilian Jars"	16 minutes	March 17, 2021
129	12	"Short Stuff: Cellphones on Airplanes"	14 minutes	March 24, 2021
130	13	"Short Stuff: What's the oldest book?"	12 minutes	March 31, 2021
131	14	"Short Stuff: Venus de Milo"	12 minutes	April 7, 2021
132	15	"Short Stuff: Palindromes"	14 minutes	April 14, 2021
133	16	"Short Stuff: Madam C.J. Walker"	14 minutes	April 21, 2021
134	17	"Short Stuff: Ivar The Boneless"	11 minutes	April 28, 2021
135	18	"Short Stuff: Squarer Than Wombat Poop"	13 minutes	May 5, 2021
136	19	"Short Stuff: Garter Snakes"	12 minutes	May 12, 2021
137	20	"Short Stuff: Speed Reading"	14 minutes	May 19, 2021
138	21	"Short Stuff: Parachute Emergency!"	13 minutes	May 26, 2021
139	22	"Short Stuff: Runner's High"	13 minutes	June 2, 2021
140	23	"Short Stuff: Chinatowns"	14 minutes	June 9, 2021
141	24	"Short Stuff: Mojave Megaphone"	13 minutes	June 16, 2021
142	25	"Short Stuff: Chastity Belts"	13 minutes	June 23, 2021
143	26	"Short Stuff: Beast of Gevaudan"	12 minutes	June 30, 2021
144	27	"Short Stuff: Sulfanilamide Disaster"	13 minutes	July 7, 2021
