= List of Stuff You Should Know episodes (2015) =

This is a list of episodes from 2015 for the Stuff You Should Know podcast

== 2015 season ==
No. in series	No. in season	Title	Length	Original air date
706	1	"SYSK Live: How Bars Work"	51 minutes	January 1, 2015
707	2	"How Jim Henson Worked"	43 minutes	January 6, 2015
708	3	"How Online Gambling Works"	41 minutes	January 8, 2015
709	4	"How the Scientific Method Works"	63 minutes	January 13, 2015
710	5	"Juggling: What the Heck"	51 minutes	January 15, 2015
711	6	"How the March on Washington Worked"	45 minutes	January 20, 2015
712	7	"Nostradamus: Predictor of the future? Not so much."	41 minutes	January 22, 2015
713	8	"How Poison Ivy Works"	38 minutes	January 27, 2015
714	9	"How Hot Wheels Work"	45 minutes	January 29, 2015
715	10	"Rainbows: Delighting humanity since forever"	32 minutes	February 3, 2015
716	11	"How Ice Cream Works"	45 minutes	February 5, 2015
717	12	"How Feng Shui Works"	44 minutes	February 10, 2015
718	13	"What is folklore?"	46 minutes	February 12, 2015
719	14	"Is there treasure on Oak Island?"	40 minutes	February 17, 2015
720	15	"How Perfume Works"	60 minutes	February 19, 2015
721	16	"Why Do Lefties Exist?"	43 minutes	February 24, 2015
722	17	"Some Movies That Changed Filmmaking"	60 minutes	February 26, 2015
723	18	"How ESP Works(?)"	57 minutes	March 3, 2015
724	19	"How Stonehenge Works"	45 minutes	March 5, 2015
725	20	"How Fleas Work"	41 minutes	March 10, 2015
726	21	"How Tea Works"	54 minutes	March 12, 2015
727	22	"How Anesthesia Works"	54 minutes	March 17, 2015
728	23	"Earwax: Live With It"	38 minutes	March 19, 2015
729	24	"10 Bizarre Medical Treatments"	46 minutes	March 24, 2015
730	25	"How Desalination Works"	39 minutes	March 26, 2015
731	26	"Does the body replace itself?"	40 minutes	March 31, 2015
732	27	"Thanks, Easter Bunny! Bock Bock!"	44 minutes	April 2, 2015
733	28	"Polyamory: When two just won’t do"	46 minutes	April 7, 2015
734	29	"What’s the deal with blood types?"	62 minutes	April 9, 2015
735	30	"How Slinky Works"	53 minutes	April 14, 2015
736	31	"How Zero Population Growth Works"	52 minutes	April 16, 2015
737	32	"How Clowns Work"	49 minutes	April 21, 2015
738	33	"Oh No, Snakes!"	51 minutes	April 23, 2015
739	34	"How Water Slides Work"	39 minutes	April 28, 2015
740	35	"How Spiders Work"	61 minutes	April 30, 2015
741	36	"How Therapeutic Hypothermia Works"	52 minutes	May 5, 2015
742	37	"Josh and Chuck Make It Through Male Puberty"	53 minutes	May 7, 2015
743	38	"Does the FDA Protect Americans?"	60 minutes	May 12, 2015
744	39	"How Pinewood Derbies Work"	47 minutes	May 14, 2015
745	40	"How Internet Censorship Works"	46 minutes	May 19, 2015
746	41	"How Color Works"	45 minutes	May 21, 2015
747	42	"How Junk Food Works"	49 minutes	May 26, 2015
748	43	"How Tupperware Works"	40 minutes	May 28, 2015
749	44	"How Street Gangs Work"	49 minutes	June 2, 2015
750	45	"How Ocean Currents Work"	41 minutes	June 4, 2015
751	46	"How the Wow! Signal Works"	36 minutes	June 9, 2015
752	47	"Bridges: Nature Abhors Them"	60 minutes	June 11, 2015
753	48	"How BASE Jumping Works"	56 minutes	June 16, 2015
754	49	"Are You My Mother?: How Animal Imprinting Works"	39 minutes	June 18, 2015
755	50	"How Landfills Work"	43 minutes	June 23, 2015
756	51	"Mosquitoes: The Worst"	44 minutes	June 25, 2015
757	52	"How Audience Testing Works"	45 minutes	June 30, 2015
758	53	"How Circus Families Work"	46 minutes	July 2, 2015
759	54	"How Egypt’s Pyramids Work"	51 minutes	July 7, 2015
760	55	"How Brickfilm Works"	34 minutes	July 9, 2015
761	56	"How the Terracotta Army Works"	34 minutes	July 14, 2015
762	57	"The Time Nazis Invaded Florida"	59 minutes	July 16, 2015
763	58	"How Citizen’s Arrests Work"	39 minutes	July 21, 2015
764	59	"Road Rage: GRRRR!!!"	55 minutes	July 23, 2015
765	60	"How Profiling Works"	50 minutes	July 28, 2015
766	61	"How Bats Work"	47 minutes	July 30, 2015
767	62	"How Earth-Like Planets Work"	33 minutes	August 4, 2015
768	63	"How Droughts Work"	53 minutes	August 6, 2015
769	64	"How Auto-Tune Works"	55 minutes	August 11, 2015
770	65	"Hula-Hoops: The Toy That’s A Shape"	42 minutes	August 13, 2015
771	66	"Pigeons: Homing, Passenger, Carrier and Otherwise"	53 minutes	August 18, 2015
772	67	"How Umami Works!"	38 minutes	August 20, 2015
773	68	"How Hot Air Balloons Work"	50 minutes	August 25, 2015
774	69	"Nirvana: Not The Band"	35 minutes	August 27, 2015
775	70	"How to Donate Your Body to Science"	45 minutes	September 1, 2015
776	71	"How Alcoholism Works"	52 minutes	September 3, 2015
777	72	"How Police Dogs Work"	39 minutes	September 8, 2015
778	73	"How Chili Peppers Work"	56 minutes	September 10, 2015
779	74	"How Publicists Work"	46 minutes	September 15, 2015
780	75	"The Great Nuclear Winter Debate of 1983"	58 minutes	September 17, 2015
781	76	"How Cult Deprogramming Worked"	40 minutes	September 22, 2015
782	77	"Geothermal Energy: Earth’s Gift to Mankind"	38 minutes	September 24, 2015
783	78	"Chuck and Josh Make It Through Female Puberty"	58 minutes	September 29, 2015
784	79	"How PEZ Works"	45 minutes	October 1, 2015
785	80	"How Lobbying Works"	56 minutes	October 6, 2015
786	81	"What was the Philadelphia Experiment?"	50 minutes	October 8, 2015
787	82	"How Vestigial Organs Work"	46 minutes	October 13, 2015
788	83	"How Wine Fraud Works"	49 minutes	October 15, 2015
789	84	"Please Listen to How Plasma Waste Converters Work"	37 minutes	October 20, 2015
790	85	"Vocal Fry and Other Speech Trends"	38 minutes	October 22, 2015
791	86	"How Passports Work"	39 minutes	October 27, 2015
792	87	"Josh N Chuck’s Hallowe’en Spooky Scarefest"	53 minutes	October 29, 2015
793	88	"The Dark Origins of Fairy Tales"	44 minutes	November 3, 2015
794	89	"How Dementia Works"	50 minutes	November 4, 2015
795	90	"How Grimm’s Fairy Tales Work"	54 minutes	November 5, 2015
796	91	"Maggots: Good For Healing Wounds, Turns Out"	40 minutes	November 10, 2015
797	92	"How The Voynich Manuscript Works"	43 minutes	November 12, 2015
798	93	"What’s the Deal With Staring?"	37 minutes	November 17, 2015
799	94	"How Rodney Dangerfield Worked, Live From LA"	58 minutes	November 18, 2015
800	95	"The Lowdown on Anonymous"	48 minutes	November 24, 2015
801	96	"Live in Chicago: How Public Relations Works"	77 minutes	November 26, 2015
802	97	"How HIV/AIDS Works, Part I"	56 minutes	December 1, 2015
803	98	"How HIV/AIDS Works, Part II"	44 minutes	December 3, 2015
804	99	"Carl Sagan: American Hero"	41 minutes	December 8, 2015
805	100	"How Reverse Psychology Works"	36 minutes	December 10, 2015
806	101	"How the Antikythera Mechanism Works"	35 minutes	December 15, 2015
807	102	"The Star Wars Holiday Special of 1978"	57 minutes	December 17, 2015
808	103	"How Gossip Works"	39 minutes	December 22, 2015
809	104	"The Stuff You Should Know 2015 Jolly Christmas Extravaganza"	44 minutes	December 24, 2015
810	105	"The Great Wall of China Episode"	44 minutes	December 29, 2015
811	106	"How Lizzie Borden Worked"	45 minutes	December 31, 2015
