= List of Stuff You Should Know episodes (2008) =

This is a list of episodes from 2008 for the Stuff You Should Know podcast

== 2008 season ==
No. in series	No. in season	Title	Length	Original air date
1	1	"How Grassoline Works"	5 minutes	April 17, 2008
2	2	"How Altruism Works"	5 minutes	April 17, 2008
3	3	"How Lame Ducks Work"	5 minutes	April 17, 2008
4	4	"Are Nazi War Criminals Still At Large?"	4 minutes	April 30, 2008
5	5	"How Trolley Problems Work"	5 minutes	May 6, 2008
6	6	"Can I feel pregnant when my wife is?"	5 minutes	May 6, 2008
7	7	"Why Does Toothpaste Make Orange Juice Taste Bad?"	5 minutes	May 13, 2008
8	8	"How Evolution in Isolation Works"	4 minutes	May 15, 2008
9	9	"Are Dogs Really Man’s Best Friend?"	5 minutes	May 20, 2008
10	10	"Does Gum Stay in your Stomach for Seven Years?"	5 minutes	May 22, 2008
11	11	"How Antibacterial Soap Works"	5 minutes	May 28, 2008
12	12	"Can People Really Get Hysterical Strength?"	5 minutes	May 29, 2008
13	13	"How Contagious Yawning Works"	5 minutes	June 4, 2008
14	14	"How The Eye of a Tornado Works"	5 minutes	June 6, 2008
15	15	"Could salt water fuel cars?"	5 minutes	June 10, 2008
16	16	"What’s the most expensive toilet in the world?"	5 minutes	June 12, 2008
17	17	"How Manufacturing Water Works"	5 minutes	June 18, 2008
18	18	"How Swearing at Work Works"	5 minutes	June 20, 2008
19	19	"How Oil Shale Works"	5 minutes	June 24, 2008
20	20	"How Death-Proof Cars Work"	5 minutes	June 26, 2008
21	21	"How Murphy’s Law Works"	5 minutes	July 1, 2008
22	22	"How Abandoned Cities Work"	5 minutes	July 1, 2008
23	23	"How Personal Rapid Transport Works"	5 minutes	July 7, 2008
24	24	"How Ripperology Works"	5 minutes	July 10, 2008
25	25	"Can I Survive a Shark Attack by Gouging Out Its Eyes?"	5 minutes	July 15, 2008
26	26	"Are Dogs a Shark’s Favorite Meal?"	5 minutes	July 17, 2008
27	27	"How Carbon Capture Works"	5 minutes	July 22, 2008
28	28	"Why do people blush?"	6 minutes	July 24, 2008
29	29	"Is knife hunting the fairest way to hunt?"	7 minutes	July 29, 2008
30	30	"Exactly what happens if we run out of water?"	12 minutes	July 31, 2008
31	31	"Are there real-life fight clubs?"	7 minutes	August 5, 2008
32	32	"Is there a torture manual?"	7 minutes	August 8, 2008
33	33	"How could a cat scuba dive?"	13 minutes	August 12, 2008
34	34	"10 Terribly Bungled Crimes"	11 minutes	August 14, 2008
35	35	"Are humans wired to survive?"	13 minutes	August 19, 2008
36	36	"How Blood Pressure Works"	13 minutes	August 21, 2008
37	37	"Will robots get married?"	15 minutes	August 26, 2008
38	38	"What are smart mobs?"	14 minutes	August 28, 2008
39	39	"Is there a worst way to die?"	14 minutes	September 2, 2008
40	40	"What’s the difference between deodorant and antiperspirant?"	14 minutes	September 4, 2008
41	41	"Is sleep that important?"	13 minutes	September 9, 2008
42	42	"Why don’t we live underground?"	16 minutes	September 11, 2008
43	43	"What’s the ultimatum game?"	13 minutes	September 16, 2008
44	44	"How Can I Erase My Identity and Start Over?"	11 minutes	September 18, 2008
45	45	"Is quitting smoking contagious?"	19 minutes	September 23, 2008
46	46	"How Graceland Works"	16 minutes	September 25, 2008
47	47	"How Delta Force Works"	20 minutes	September 30, 2008
48	48	"How China’s Pollution Sniffers Work"	13 minutes	October 2, 2008
49	49	"How Entomophagy Works"	13 minutes	October 7, 2008
50	50	"How Cannibalism Works"	18 minutes	October 9, 2008
51	51	"Will we soon be extinct?"	10 minutes	October 14, 2008
52	52	"How Living Off the Grid Works"	14 minutes	October 16, 2008
53	53	"How the Bailout Works"	24 minutes	October 21, 2008
54	54	"How do Tibetans avoid altitude sickness?"	12 minutes	October 23, 2008
55	55	"Is a free market “free” if it’s regulated?"	16 minutes	October 28, 2008
56	56	"How Prayer Healing Works"	17 minutes	October 30, 2008
57	57	"Why do grooms carry brides over the threshold?"	12 minutes	November 4, 2008
58	58	"How Mortgage-backed Securities Work"	20 minutes	November 6, 2008
59	59	"Did the CIA test LSD on unsuspecting Americans?"	26 minutes	November 11, 2008
60	60	"Why doesn’t the FDA regulate herbal supplements?"	13 minutes	November 13, 2008
61	61	"How Eco-anxiety Works"	14 minutes	November 18, 2008
62	62	"How Corporate Personhood Works"	16 minutes	November 20, 2008
63	63	"How Albert Einstein’s Brain Worked"	18 minutes	November 25, 2008
64	64	"How Thanksgiving Works"	20 minutes	November 27, 2008
65	65	"How OCD Works"	14 minutes	December 2, 2008
66	66	"How Guerrilla Gardening Works"	17 minutes	December 4, 2008
67	67	"How the Five Day Weekend Works"	24 minutes	December 9, 2008
68	68	"Extended Product Warranties: To Buy or Not to Buy?"	16 minutes	December 11, 2008
69	69	"Where’s the best place on your body to get shot?"	17 minutes	December 16, 2008
70	70	"What can be done with a dead body?"	15 minutes	December 18, 2008
71	71	"How Flirting Works"	17 minutes	December 23, 2008
72	72	"How to Survive a Plane Crash"	19 minutes	December 25, 2008
73	73	"How Habeas Corpus Works"	22 minutes	December 30, 2008
