= List of Stuff You Should Know episodes (2010) =

This is a list of episodes from 2010 for the Stuff You Should Know podcast.

== 2010 season ==
| No. in series | No. in season | Title | Length | Original air date |
|---|---|---|---|---|
| 178 | 1 | "How Noodling Works" | 28 minutes | January 5, 2010 |
| 179 | 2 | "How Mercenaries Work" | 29 minutes | January 7, 2010 |
| 180 | 3 | "How Organ Donation Works" | 35 minutes | January 12, 2010 |
| 181 | 4 | "How the Sun Works" | 24 minutes | January 14, 2010 |
| 182 | 5 | "Why are honeybees disappearing?" | 25 minutes | January 19, 2010 |
| 183 | 6 | "Will the moon save humanity?" | 22 minutes | January 21, 2010 |
| 184 | 7 | "What are ninja?" | 33 minutes | January 26, 2010 |
| 185 | 8 | "Are there undiscovered people?" | 24 minutes | January 28, 2010 |
| 186 | 9 | "How Swat Teams Work" | 37 minutes | February 2, 2010 |
| 187 | 10 | "Why do we believe in urban legends?" | 32 minutes | February 4, 2010 |
| 188 | 11 | "How Witchcraft Works" | 43 minutes | February 9, 2010 |
| 189 | 12 | "How Braille Works" | 29 minutes | February 11, 2010 |
| 190 | 13 | "Who are the Amish?" | 41 minutes | February 16, 2010 |
| 191 | 14 | "Five Crazy Government Experiments" | 24 minutes | February 18, 2010 |
| 192 | 15 | "How Bail Works" | 24 minutes | February 23, 2010 |
| 193 | 16 | "How Bounty Hunters Work" | 23 minutes | February 25, 2010 |
| 194 | 17 | "Was Mesopotamia the Cradle of Civilization?" | 27 minutes | March 2, 2010 |
| 195 | 18 | "How Scabies Work" | 20 minutes | March 4, 2010 |
| 196 | 19 | "What’s the deal with carbon trading?" | 32 minutes | March 9, 2010 |
| 197 | 20 | "What exactly is Fascism?" | 20 minutes | March 11, 2010 |
| 198 | 21 | "How Lotteries Work" | 25 minutes | March 16, 2010 |
| 199 | 22 | "Who were the Vikings?" | 31 minutes | March 18, 2010 |
| 200 | 23 | "How Urban Planning Works" | 29 minutes | March 23, 2010 |
| 201 | 24 | "How Taxidermy Works" | 30 minutes | March 25, 2010 |
| 202 | 25 | "What the heck is a hiccup?" | 23 minutes | March 30, 2010 |
| 203 | 26 | "How McDonald’s Works" | 42 minutes | April 1, 2010 |
| 204 | 27 | "How Desertification Works" | 22 minutes | April 6, 2010 |
| 205 | 28 | "Are zoos good or bad for animals?" | 26 minutes | April 8, 2010 |
| 206 | 29 | "How Tourette Syndrome Works" | 30 minutes | April 13, 2010 |
| 207 | 30 | "How Castles Work" | 28 minutes | April 16, 2010 |
| 208 | 31 | "Are there people who can’t feel pain?" | 30 minutes | April 20, 2010 |
| 209 | 32 | "Mirror Neurons: Are there people who feel others’ pain?" | 35 minutes | April 22, 2010 |
| 210 | 33 | "What makes a genius?" | 35 minutes | April 27, 2010 |
| 211 | 34 | "How Cliff Diving Works" | 27 minutes | April 29, 2010 |
| 212 | 35 | "How LEGOs Work" | 36 minutes | May 4, 2010 |
| 213 | 36 | "How hard is it to steal a work of art?" | 30 minutes | May 6, 2010 |
| 214 | 37 | "How Twins Work How Twins Work" | 38 minutes | May 11, 2010 |
| 215 | 38 | "5 Successful Counterfeiters" | 26 minutes | May 13, 2010 |
| 216 | 39 | "SYSK’s Guatemalan Adventure, Part One" | 55 minutes | May 18, 2010 |
| 217 | 40 | "SYSK’s Guatemalan Adventure, Part Two" | 46 minutes | May 20, 2010 |
| 218 | 41 | "What makes a serial killer?" | 44 minutes | May 25, 2010 |
| 219 | 42 | "Can humans start an earthquake?" | 24 minutes | May 27, 2010 |
| 220 | 43 | "How do you clean up an oil spill?" | 25 minutes | June 1, 2010 |
| 221 | 44 | "How Flamethrowers Work" | 24 minutes | June 3, 2010 |
| 222 | 45 | "What’s the deal with sinkholes?" | 29 minutes | June 8, 2010 |
| 223 | 46 | "Can your grandfather’s diet shorten your life?" | 30 minutes | June 10, 2010 |
| 224 | 47 | "How the Innocence Project Works" | 35 minutes | June 15, 2010 |
| 225 | 48 | "How Samurai Work" | 34 minutes | June 17, 2010 |
| 226 | 49 | "How Ghost Prisons Work" | 34 minutes | June 22, 2010 |
| 227 | 50 | "Can quicksand kill you?" | 25 minutes | June 24, 2010 |
| 228 | 51 | "How Traffic Works" | 32 minutes | June 29, 2010 |
| 229 | 52 | "Did Thomas Jefferson rewrite the Bible?" | 23 minutes | July 1, 2010 |
| 230 | 53 | "What’s the deal with Voodoo?" | 32 minutes | July 6, 2010 |
| 231 | 54 | "How do butterfly wings get their color?" | 26 minutes | July 8, 2010 |
| 232 | 55 | "How Reincarnation Works" | 36 minutes | July 13, 2010 |
| 233 | 56 | "What’s the deal with Bond, James Bond?" | 39 minutes | July 15, 2010 |
| 234 | 57 | "Taste and How it Works" | 35 minutes | July 20, 2010 |
| 235 | 58 | "Saunas: More Interesting Than You Think!" | 37 minutes | July 22, 2010 |
| 236 | 59 | "Why Ticks Suck" | 39 minutes | July 27, 2010 |
| 237 | 60 | "How Presidential Pardons Work" | 41 minutes | July 29, 2010 |
| 238 | 61 | "How Quantum Suicide Works" | 31 minutes | August 3, 2010 |
| 239 | 62 | "What’s so special about Route 66?" | 23 minutes | August 5, 2010 |
| 240 | 63 | "How Grow Houses Work" | 36 minutes | August 10, 2010 |
| 241 | 64 | "Prisons: Not as Fun as You’d Think" | 44 minutes | August 12, 2010 |
| 242 | 65 | "Breathalyzers: Really, Really Complicated" | 32 minutes | August 17, 2010 |
| 243 | 66 | "How the MARS Turbine Works" | 27 minutes | August 19, 2010 |
| 244 | 67 | "How Sleepwalking Works" | 25 minutes | August 24, 2010 |
| 245 | 68 | "How Freemasons Work" | 45 minutes | August 26, 2010 |
| 246 | 69 | "How Cremation Works" | 41 minutes | August 31, 2010 |
| 247 | 70 | "How are college football rankings determined?" | 33 minutes | September 2, 2010 |
| 248 | 71 | "How Crime-Scene Clean-up Works" | 32 minutes | September 7, 2010 |
| 249 | 72 | "How Customs Works" | 28 minutes | September 9, 2010 |
| 250 | 73 | "How Mirrors Work" | 26 minutes | September 14, 2010 |
| 251 | 74 | "What is biospeleology?" | 29 minutes | September 16, 2010 |
| 252 | 75 | "Octopus, Octopi, Octopod, Octopuses" | 36 minutes | September 21, 2010 |
| 253 | 76 | "Hypnosis: You’re Getting Sleepy" | 31 minutes | September 23, 2010 |
| 254 | 77 | "How Roller Derby Works" | 38 minutes | September 28, 2010 |
| 255 | 78 | "Is tone deafness hereditary?" | 21 minutes | September 30, 2010 |
| 256 | 79 | "Why would anyone want multiple spouses?" | 34 minutes | October 5, 2010 |
| 257 | 80 | "How Knights Work" | 48 minutes | October 7, 2010 |
| 258 | 81 | "Is science phasing out sleep?" | 36 minutes | October 12, 2010 |
| 259 | 82 | "How House Swapping Works" | 31 minutes | October 14, 2010 |
| 260 | 83 | "How Gender Reassignment Works" | 50 minutes | October 19, 2010 |
| 261 | 84 | "Can you treat mental illness with psychedelics?" | 42 minutes | October 21, 2010 |
| 262 | 85 | "Jealous much?" | 46 minutes | October 26, 2010 |
| 263 | 86 | "The Tomb" | 30 minutes | October 28, 2010 |
| 264 | 87 | "Animal Migration: Where’s that gnu gnoing?" | 27 minutes | November 2, 2010 |
| 265 | 88 | "Addiction: Why you can’t kick SYSK" | 43 minutes | November 4, 2010 |
| 266 | 89 | "Prohibition: Turns Out That America Loves to Drink" | 39 minutes | November 9, 2010 |
| 267 | 90 | "How Rehab Works" | 45 minutes | November 11, 2010 |
| 268 | 91 | "Have all the good ideas already been discovered?" | 32 minutes | November 16, 2010 |
| 269 | 92 | "Can Lifestraw save the world?" | 33 minutes | November 18, 2010 |
| 270 | 93 | "A Rigid, Sterile Look at Kissing" | 32 minutes | November 23, 2010 |
| 271 | 94 | "How Dreadlocks Work" | 31 minutes | November 25, 2010 |
| 272 | 95 | "How Circumcision Works" | 41 minutes | November 30, 2010 |
| 273 | 96 | "How the Rules of War Work" | 34 minutes | December 2, 2010 |
| 274 | 97 | "Green Renovation and Construction" | 30 minutes | December 7, 2010 |
| 275 | 98 | "How Hanukkah Works" | 21 minutes | December 9, 2010 |
| 276 | 99 | "How Agritourism Works" | 33 minutes | December 14, 2010 |
| 277 | 100 | "How Migraines Work" | 29 minutes | December 16, 2010 |
| 278 | 101 | "Why can’t we find Amelia Earhart?" | 27 minutes | December 21, 2010 |
| 279 | 102 | "How Homelessness Works" | 40 minutes | December 23, 2010 |
| 280 | 103 | "How Immigration Works" | 49 minutes | December 28, 2010 |
| 281 | 104 | "How Volcanoes Work" | 30 minutes | December 30, 2010 |
