= List of Stuff You Should Know episodes (2016) =

This is a list of episodes from 2016 for the Stuff You Should Know podcast.

== 2016 season ==
No. in series	No. in season	Title	Length	Original air date
812	1	"The "Satanic Panic" of the 1980s"	59 minutes	January 5, 2016
813	2	"Body Language!"	40 minutes	January 7, 2016
814	3	"How Futurology Works"	43 minutes	January 12, 2016
815	4	"The Duality of Caffeine"	49 minutes	January 14, 2016
816	5	"Sir Isaac Newton: Greatest Scientist of All Time?"	55 minutes	January 19, 2016
817	6	"Timber! How Timber Works"	67 minutes	January 21, 2016
818	7	"How Personalized Medicine Works"	41 minutes	January 26, 2016
819	8	"Does Whole-Body Cryotherapy Work?"	37 minutes	January 28, 2016
820	9	"Operation Mincemeat: How A Corpse Fooled the Nazis"	47 minutes	February 2, 2016
821	10	"How Land Diving Works"	40 minutes	February 4, 2016
822	11	"How Rabies Works"	43 minutes	February 9, 2016
823	12	"What’s the Deal With Poop?"	50 minutes	February 11, 2016
824	13	"How Jackhammers Work"	34 minutes	February 16, 2016
825	14	"How Nitrous Oxide Works"	57 minutes	February 18, 2016
826	15	"The Future of Renewable Energy, Featuring Bill Gates"	53 minutes	February 23, 2016
827	16	"(Approximately) 10 Things That Vanished Mysteriously"	57 minutes	February 25, 2016
828	17	"How El Nino Works"	39 minutes	March 1, 2016
829	18	"How Freak Shows Worked"	50 minutes	March 3, 2016
830	19	"How The Iditarod Works"	59 minutes	March 8, 2016
831	20	"How Dark Money Works"	51 minutes	March 10, 2016
832	21	"Some Really Interesting Cases of Mass Hysteria"	40 minutes	March 15, 2016
833	22	"How Makeup Works"	54 minutes	March 17, 2016
834	23	"Who Gets to Name Continents?"	43 minutes	March 22, 2016
835	24	"How TED Talks Work: Featuring Roman Mars"	64 minutes	March 24, 2016
836	25	"What Was the Deal With the Hatfields and McCoys?"	46 minutes	March 29, 2016
837	26	"Nostalgia is not the most toxic impulse"	41 minutes	March 31, 2016
838	27	"Our cats episode – right here, right meow"	58 minutes	April 5, 2016
839	28	"How Labor Strikes Work"	56 minutes	April 7, 2016
840	29	"How the Gender Pay Gap Works"	43 minutes	April 12, 2016
841	30	"How Big Bang Theory Works, with Neil deGrasse Tyson"	69 minutes	April 14, 2016
842	31	"What Makes Lead So Poisonous?"	52 minutes	April 19, 2016
843	32	"Does Kin Selection Explain Altruism?"	35 minutes	April 21, 2016
844	33	"Myths and Truths About Tornadoes"	46 minutes	April 26, 2016
845	34	"What was Operation Plowshare?"	47 minutes	April 28, 2016
846	35	"How Megalodon Worked"	36 minutes	May 3, 2016
847	36	"How LSD Works"	106 minutes	May 5, 2016
848	37	"How Snake Handlers Work"	56 minutes	May 10, 2016
849	38	"True stories of survival cannibalism!"	45 minutes	May 12, 2016
850	39	"How Bonsai Works"	58 minutes	May 17, 2016
851	40	"The Unsolved Mystery Disappearance of the Sodder Children"	48 minutes	May 19, 2016
852	41	"Chiggers: The Phantom Menace"	36 minutes	May 24, 2016
853	42	"How Crumple Zones Work"	35 minutes	May 26, 2016
854	43	"How SuperBalls Work"	35 minutes	May 31, 2016
855	44	"How Gene Editing Works"	37 minutes	June 2, 2016
856	45	"How Motion Sickness Works"	40 minutes	June 7, 2016
857	46	"What’s the deal with controlled burns?"	45 minutes	June 9, 2016
858	47	"Why Are So Many Disembodied Feet Washing Ashore In British Columbia?"	41 minutes	June 14, 2016
859	48	"How Steadicams Work"	38 minutes	June 16, 2016
860	49	"How Space Stations Work"	51 minutes	June 21, 2016
861	50	"What’s the misery index?"	48 minutes	June 23, 2016
862	51	"How Underground Mining Works"	45 minutes	June 28, 2016
863	52	"How Lighthouses Work"	49 minutes	June 30, 2016
864	53	"Research tips from SYSK"	46 minutes	July 5, 2016
865	54	"What's with this "Internet of Things"?"	64 minutes	July 7, 2016
866	55	"How Radiation Sickness Works"	50 minutes	July 12, 2016
867	56	"The Gettysburg Address: Short and Sweet"	47 minutes	July 14, 2016
868	57	"How Chaos Theory Changed the Universe"	58 minutes	July 19, 2016
869	58	"How the Moonwalk Works"	45 minutes	July 21, 2016
870	59	"How Triage Works"	47 minutes	July 26, 2016
871	60	"What is exploding head syndrome?"	39 minutes	July 28, 2016
872	61	"How Night Terrors Work"	52 minutes	August 1, 2016
873	62	"Mermaids: Not a real thing"	44 minutes	August 4, 2016
874	63	"Evel Knievel Part I"	41 minutes	August 9, 2016
875	64	"Evel Knievel Part II"	47 minutes	August 11, 2016
876	65	"How Woolly Mammoths Worked"	53 minutes	August 16, 2016
877	66	"The Delightful History of Steam Technology"	56 minutes	August 18, 2016
878	67	"Jellyfish: Even Cooler than Octopi?"	54 minutes	August 23, 2016
879	68	"This Custom of Customs"	63 minutes	August 25, 2016
880	69	"How Food Tasters Work"	55 minutes	August 30, 2016
881	70	"How the Negro Leagues Worked"	59 minutes	September 1, 2016
882	71	"How Animal Testing Works"	51 minutes	September 6, 2016
883	72	"Do Animals Have Natural Rights?"	65 minutes	September 8, 2016
884	73	"Alexander Hamilton: Most Influential American?"	52 minutes	September 13, 2016
885	74	"What's the deal with Stradivarius violins?"	41 minutes	September 15, 2016
886	75	"How Cerebral Palsy Works"	63 minutes	September 20, 2016
887	76	"All we know about Zika so far..."	49 minutes	September 22, 2016
888	77	"How Ice Ages Work"	49 minutes	September 27, 2016
889	78	"How Polar Bears Work"	48 minutes	September 29, 2016
890	79	"The Amazing History of Soda"	47 minutes	October 3, 2016
891	80	"Why Did Easter Island's Civilization Collapse?"	57 minutes	October 6, 2016
892	81	"Hibernation: Not a Snooze"	47 minutes	October 11, 2016
893	82	"How the Census Works"	47 minutes	October 13, 2016
894	83	"What's the What with Fish Fraud?"	43 minutes	October 18, 2016
895	84	"Living Underground in Beijing"	32 minutes	October 20, 2016
896	85	"How Sleep Paralysis Works, or The Worst Thing That Can Happen While You're Sleeping"	43 minutes	October 25, 2016
897	86	"The Hinterkaifeck Axe Murders"	48 minutes	October 26, 2016
898	87	"SYSK The Podcast: Special Halloween Bonus Episode 2016, The Sequel – From Hell"	38 minutes	October 31, 2016
899	88	"Ham Radio and the Hams Who Use Them"	48 minutes	November 1, 2016
900	89	"A Partial History of Action Figures"	75 minutes	November 3, 2016
901	90	"Do sin taxes work?"	53 minutes	November 8, 2016
902	91	"How Monty Python Worked: SYSK Live from LA Podfest"	54 minutes	November 10, 2016
903	92	"How Fireplaces Work"	58 minutes	November 15, 2016
904	93	"What's the Deal with Chronic Traumatic Encephalopathy?"	41 minutes	November 17, 2016
905	94	"The Kitty Genovese Story"	40 minutes	November 22, 2016
906	95	"Should Advertising to Kids Be Banned?"	68 minutes	November 24, 2016
907	96	"Frostbite: Yeeeow!"	38 minutes	November 29, 2016
908	97	"How a Flea Circus Works"	48 minutes	December 1, 2016
909	98	"Horoscopes: Written in the Stars?"	52 minutes	December 6, 2016
910	99	"Is computer addiction a thing?"	50 minutes	December 8, 2016
911	100	"Will We Find Evidence of Aliens by Their Engineering Projects?"	49 minutes	December 13, 2016
912	101	"How Porta-Potties Work"	44 minutes	December 15, 2016
913	102	"The Golden Age of Grave Robbing: Stuff You Should Know Live in London"	78 minutes	December 20, 2016
914	103	"The Stuff You Should Know 2016 Christmas Extravaganza in 3-D!"	55 minutes	December 22, 2016
915	104	"Can you live without a bank account?"	53 minutes	December 27, 2016
916	105	"Human Blockheads: A Real Thing"	48 minutes	December 29, 2016
