= List of Stuff You Should Know episodes (2014) =

This is a list of episodes from 2014 for the Stuff You Should Know podcast.

== 2014 season ==
No. in series	No. in season	Title	Length	Original air date
601	1	"Could you live without a refrigerator?"	37 minutes	January 2, 2014
602	2	"Your limb is torn off – now what?"	36 minutes	January 6, 2014
603	3	"How Filibusters Work"	37 minutes	January 9, 2014
604	4	"Was there a real King Arthur?"	46 minutes	January 14, 2014
605	5	"How Pet Psychics Work"	37 minutes	January 15, 2014
606	6	"Chuck and Josh Bust a Few Everyday Myths"	36 minutes	January 21, 2014
607	7	"How the Deep Web Works"	32 minutes	January 22, 2014
608	8	"What’s the deal with the debt ceiling?"	35 minutes	January 28, 2014
609	9	"What are crystal skulls?"	34 minutes	January 30, 2014
610	10	"Will computers replace doctors?"	38 minutes	February 4, 2014
611	11	"How Sign Language Works"	47 minutes	February 6, 2014
612	12	"Do objects or experiences make us happier?"	34 minutes	February 11, 2014
613	13	"How Cave Dwellers Work"	39 minutes	February 12, 2014
614	14	"How Salt Works"	43 minutes	February 18, 2014
615	15	"How Amputation Works"	56 minutes	February 19, 2014
616	16	"Termites: They Bore But They Aren’t Boring"	43 minutes	February 25, 2014
617	17	"What happened at Kent State?"	39 minutes	February 27, 2014
618	18	"How the Spanish Inquisition Worked"	44 minutes	March 4, 2014
619	19	"How Online Dating Works"	49 minutes	March 6, 2014
620	20	"How Skateboarding Works"	46 minutes	March 10, 2014
621	21	"How Black Boxes Work"	37 minutes	March 12, 2014
622	22	"Tattoos: Not Just For Dirtbags Anymore"	66 minutes	March 17, 2014
623	23	"How Electricity Works"	45 minutes	March 20, 2014
624	24	"How Amnesia Works"	59 minutes	March 25, 2014
625	25	"How Landslides Work"	34 minutes	March 27, 2014
626	26	"How 3D Printing Works"	48 minutes	April 1, 2014
627	27	"How Income Taxes Work"	43 minutes	April 3, 2014
628	28	"How Charles Darwin Worked"	50 minutes	April 7, 2014
629	29	"How Natural Selection Works"	57 minutes	April 10, 2014
630	30	"How Dissociative Identity Disorder Works"	45 minutes	April 15, 2014
631	31	"How Burlesque Works"	51 minutes	April 17, 2014
632	32	"How Mars Works"	55 minutes	April 22, 2014
633	33	"Halitosis: Worst Smell Ever?"	35 minutes	April 24, 2014
634	34	"How the ACLU Works"	46 minutes	April 28, 2014
635	35	"How Marijuana Works"	64 minutes	May 1, 2014
636	36	"How Gypsies Work"	46 minutes	May 6, 2014
637	37	"How Bipolar Disorder Works"	38 minutes	May 8, 2014
638	38	"How the Human Microbiome Project Works"	37 minutes	May 13, 2014
639	39	"How the Paleo Diet Works"	44 minutes	May 15, 2014
640	40	"8 Reasons Why Your Body Is So Gross"	49 minutes	May 20, 2014
641	41	"How Avalanches Work"	43 minutes	May 21, 2014
642	42	"How Temper Tantrums Work"	38 minutes	May 27, 2014
643	43	"Archaeology in a Nutshell"	50 minutes	May 29, 2014
644	44	"Why is Venice so wet?"	35 minutes	June 2, 2014
645	45	"How the Space Race Worked"	58 minutes	June 5, 2014
646	46	"How the Placebo Effect Works"	41 minutes	June 10, 2014
647	47	"Sugar: It Powers the Earth"	44 minutes	June 12, 2014
648	48	"Is your employer spying on you?"	44 minutes	June 17, 2014
649	49	"How Soccer Works"	60 minutes	June 19, 2014
650	50	"How the La Brea Tar Pits Work"	33 minutes	June 24, 2014
651	51	"How the MPAA Works"	43 minutes	June 27, 2014
652	52	"How The Louvre Works"	43 minutes	July 1, 2014
653	53	"How Monopoly Works"	65 minutes	July 3, 2014
654	54	"Is brain size related to intelligence?"	34 minutes	July 8, 2014
655	55	"How Grass Works? Yes, How Grass Works"	51 minutes	July 10, 2014
656	56	"How Sushi Works"	54 minutes	July 15, 2014
657	57	"How In Vitro Fertlization Works"	38 minutes	July 17, 2014
658	58	"How Trickle-Down Economics Works"	45 minutes	July 22, 2014
659	59	"The Skinny on Probiotics"	38 minutes	July 24, 2014
660	60	"Is there a dark side of the moon?"	30 minutes	July 29, 2014
661	61	"How Morgellons Disease Works"	35 minutes	July 31, 2014
662	62	"How Play-Doh Works"	43 minutes	August 5, 2014
663	63	"What is a Numbers Station?"	40 minutes	August 7, 2014
664	64	"How the NSA Works"	46 minutes	August 12, 2014
665	65	"How Ebola Works"	40 minutes	August 14, 2014
666	66	"Going Up: Elevators"	45 minutes	August 19, 2014
667	67	"How the Berlin Wall Worked"	48 minutes	August 21, 2014
668	68	"What’s the deal with headstones?"	50 minutes	August 26, 2014
669	69	"How Blimps Work"	49 minutes	August 28, 2014
670	70	"How Pinball Works"	47 minutes	September 2, 2014
671	71	"How TV Ratings Work"	43 minutes	September 4, 2014
672	72	"How Stem Cells Work"	38 minutes	September 9, 2014
673	73	"How Royalty Works"	49 minutes	September 11, 2014
674	74	"How Socialism Works"	51 minutes	September 16, 2014
675	75	"How Currency Works"	49 minutes	September 18, 2014
676	76	"How Police Interrogation Works"	67 minutes	September 23, 2014
677	77	"How Animal Domestication Works"	52 minutes	September 25, 2014
678	78	"How Rogue Waves Work"	34 minutes	September 30, 2014
679	79	"How Panic Attacks Work"	36 minutes	October 2, 2014
680	80	"How Karate Works"	45 minutes	October 7, 2014
681	81	"How Skywriting Works"	36 minutes	October 9, 2014
682	82	"Virus Talk with Josh and Chuck"	34 minutes	October 14, 2014
683	83	"How The Great Train Robbery Worked"	45 minutes	October 16, 2014
684	84	"How Extinction Works"	49 minutes	October 21, 2014
685	85	"How Animal Camouflage Works"	34 minutes	October 23, 2014
686	86	"Is there a disease that kills by preventing sleep?"	35 minutes	October 28, 2014
687	87	"How Haunted House Attractions Work"	48 minutes	October 30, 2014
688	88	"SYSK’s Halloween Scare Fest"	34 minutes	October 31, 2014
689	89	"Can Nuclear Fusion Reactors Save The World?"	45 minutes	November 4, 2014
690	90	"How Limousines Work"	38 minutes	November 6, 2014
691	91	"How Patents Work"	63 minutes	November 11, 2014
692	92	"What’s the deal with crop circles?"	40 minutes	November 13, 2014
693	93	"How the Enlightenment Works"	42 minutes	November 18, 2014
694	94	"What is Collective Hysteria?"	44 minutes	November 20, 2014
695	95	"How Kickstarter Works"	39 minutes	November 25, 2014
696	96	"How Terraforming Will Work"	42 minutes	November 27, 2014
697	97	"How Leper Colonies Worked"	29 minutes	December 2, 2014
698	98	"How X-Rays Work"	41 minutes	December 4, 2014
699	99	"How The Hum Works"	39 minutes	December 9, 2014
700	100	"Homeschooling: Not Just For Hippies and Religious People Anymore"	52 minutes	December 11, 2014
701	101	"Boomerangs: Magic Sticks of Physics"	32 minutes	December 16, 2014
702	102	"How Cinnamon Works"	39 minutes	December 18, 2014
703	103	"How the GED Test Works"	33 minutes	December 23, 2014
704	104	"Josh and Chuck’s 2014 Christmas Extravaganza!"	38 minutes	December 25, 2014
705	105	"How Sea Monsters Work"	39 minutes	December 30, 2014
