= List of Stuff You Should Know episodes (2020) =

This is a list of episodes from 2020 for the Stuff You Should Know podcast.

== 2020 season ==
No. in series	No. in season	Title	Length	Original air date
1230	1	"How Safecracking Works"	63 minutes	January 2, 2020
1231	2	"The Disappearance of Flight MH370, Part I"	46 minutes	January 7, 2020
1232	3	"The Disappearance of Flight MH370, Part II"	50 minutes	January 9, 2020
1233	4	"Transdermal Implants: Body Art or Nightmare Fuel?"	58 minutes	January 14, 2020
1234	5	"The Tulsa 'Race Riots'"	51 minutes	January 16, 2020
1235	6	"Why Postal Employees Go Postal"	53 minutes	January 21, 2020
1236	7	"Barefoot Running: The Best Podcast Episode in History"	47 minutes	January 23, 2020
1237	8	"Amazing Animal Stories!"	42 minutes	January 28, 2020
1238	9	"Who were the Buffalo Soldiers?"	56 minutes	January 30, 2020
1239	10	"How AI Facial Recognition Works"	60 minutes	February 4, 2020
1240	11	"Why are Pentecostals growing so rapidly?"	46 minutes	February 6, 2020
1241	12	"Optogenetics: Controlling Your Genes with Light"	51 minutes	February 11, 2020
1242	13	"911 Is Not a Joke"	59 minutes	February 13, 2020
1243	14	"The Unsolved Indiana Dunes Disappearances"	46 minutes	February 18, 2020
1244	15	"Birthmarks: Probably Not the Mark of the Devil"	55 minutes	February 20, 2020
1245	16	"What's the deal with indigo?"	51 minutes	February 25, 2020
1246	17	"Sammy Davis Jr: National Treasure"	61 minutes	February 27, 2020
1247	18	"How Morphic Fields Work?"	58 minutes	March 3, 2020
1248	19	"Mardi Gras! One month late"	51 minutes	March 5, 2020
1249	20	"How Coyotes Work"	50 minutes	March 10, 2020
1250	21	"How Ice Climbing Works"	62 minutes	March 12, 2020
1251	22	"Chopsticks > Forks"	56 minutes	March 17, 2020
1252	23	"What was the Falkland Islands War all about anyway?"	57 minutes	March 19, 2020
1253	24	"Could A Robot Tax Win the War on Poverty?"	59 minutes	March 24, 2020
1254	25	"How COVID-19 Works"	71 minutes	March 26, 2020
1255	26	"How Dog Training Works"	50 minutes	March 31, 2020
1256	27	"Student Loans: UGH!"	61 minutes	April 2, 2020
1257	28	"The Legends of Lost Nazi Gold"	51 minutes	April 7, 2020
1258	29	"Dr. Elizabeth Blackwell, Feminist Physician"	54 minutes	April 9, 2020
1259	30	"Bidets: Now More Than Ever"	52 minutes	April 14, 2020
1260	31	"How Wastewater Treatment Works"	63 minutes	April 16, 2020
1261	32	"The Soul Train Episode"	51 minutes	April 21, 2020
1262	33	"How the Voyager Golden Records Work"	69 minutes	April 23, 2020
1263	34	"How Existential Risks Work"	60 minutes	April 28, 2020
1264	35	"Agatha Christie: Queen of the Murder Mystery"	58 minutes	April 30, 2020
1265	36	"I'm Spartacus!"	58 minutes	May 5, 2020
1266	37	"Zippers: Humans’ Greatest Invention? No, But Still Good"	59 minutes	May 7, 2020
1267	38	"How Herd Immunity Works"	68 minutes	May 12, 2020
1268	39	"How Peanut Butter Works"	61 minutes	May 14, 2020
1269	40	"How Spiritualism Works"	66 minutes	May 19, 2020
1270	41	"How Bras Work"	57 minutes	May 21, 2020
1271	42	"Hummingbirds: Ornery Helicopters of the Animal Kingdom"	51 minutes	May 26, 2020
1272	43	"How Narcolepsy Works"	57 minutes	May 28, 2020
1273	44	"Heroin: The Drug"	57 minutes	June 2, 2020
1274	45	"The Massacre at Tiananmen Square"	67 minutes	June 4, 2020
1275	46	"How Project Star Gate Worked"	58 minutes	June 9, 2020
1276	47	"Can You Eat A Tapeworm To Lose Weight?"	45 minutes	June 11, 2020
1277	48	"The War on Fat: The Seven Countries Study"	53 minutes	June 16, 2020
1278	49	"The Manhattan Grid"	51 minutes	June 18, 2020
1279	50	"How Ultrasound Works"	54 minutes	June 23, 2020
1280	51	"Matcha: That Ain't Just Tea"	51 minutes	June 25, 2020
1281	52	"Bruxism: Grinding Your Teeth Is the Pits"	54 minutes	June 30, 2020
1282	53	"Oh Yes, How Soil Works"	61 minutes	July 2, 2020
1283	54	"What was the KGB?"	55 minutes	July 7, 2020
1284	55	"Essential Oils: Nature's Cure?"	60 minutes	July 9, 2020
1285	56	"Flagpole Sitting: A Real Fad"	56 minutes	July 14, 2020
1286	57	"Robber Barons!"	69 minutes	July 16, 2020
1287	58	"How We Almost Got Rid of Polio"	51 minutes	July 21, 2020
1288	59	"Everything You Ever Wanted to Know About Mobile Phones"	62 minutes	July 23, 2020
1289	60	"How Hurricanes Work"	58 minutes	July 28, 2020
1290	61	"How Soap Works"	54 minutes	July 30, 2020
1291	62	"Wasps: Not as cute as bees"	52 minutes	August 4, 2020
1292	63	"How Miniature Golf Works"	53 minutes	August 6, 2020
1293	64	"Pirate Radio: Mavericks on the High Seas"	54 minutes	August 11, 2020
1294	65	"Olympic Torches: Remember Those?"	49 minutes	August 13, 2020
1295	66	"How Anti-Dieting Works"	52 minutes	August 18, 2020
1296	67	"1-800-PODCAST"	47 minutes	August 20, 2020
1297	68	"How Sneezing Works"	54 minutes	August 25, 2020
1298	69	"Blacksmiths? You got that right!"	55 minutes	August 27, 2020
1299	70	"How the Escape from Alcatraz Worked"	60 minutes	September 1, 2020
1300	71	"The Disturbing Disappearance of Tara Calico"	46 minutes	September 3, 2020
1301	72	"Frances Perkins: Influential and Unknown"	46 minutes	September 8, 2020
1302	73	"Wetlands! Wetlands! Wetlands!"	50 minutes	September 10, 2020
1303	74	"Origami: Folding Goodness"	52 minutes	September 15, 2020
1304	75	"How Election Polling Works and Doesn't Work"	52 minutes	September 17, 2020
1305	76	"How Sweepstakes Work"	56 minutes	September 22, 2020
1306	77	"At Long Last: Hawaiian Overthrow Episode"	56 minutes	September 24, 2020
1307	78	"Conjugal Visits: Not exactly what you think"	51 minutes	September 29, 2020
1308	79	"Fallout Shelters: Probably Useless (Let’s Never Find Out)"	52 minutes	October 1, 2020
1309	80	"What's the deal with swing states?"	52 minutes	October 6, 2020
1310	81	"Printing press? Big deal!"	59 minutes	October 8, 2020
1311	82	"Wind Tunnels: More Important Than You Realize"	50 minutes	October 13, 2020
1312	83	"Porcupines: Little Stabby Cutie Pies"	45 minutes	October 15, 2020
1313	84	"10 Voter Suppression Methods"	52 minutes	October 20, 2020
1314	85	"Beavers: Tail Slapping Fun"	46 minutes	October 22, 2020
1315	86	"A History of Nursing Homes"	57 minutes	October 27, 2020
1316	87	"SYSK’s Scare Your Pants Off (and Back On) Halloween Spooktacular"	41 minutes	October 29, 2020
1317	88	"The Amazing Roberto Clemente"	50 minutes	November 3, 2020
1318	89	"All the Gold In Fort Knox: Meh"	56 minutes	November 5, 2020
1319	90	"The Bay of Pigs Disaster"	54 minutes	November 10, 2020
1320	91	"How Macy's Thanksgiving Parade Works"	52 minutes	November 12, 2020
1321	92	"How Pain Works"	57 minutes	November 17, 2020
1322	93	"The Great War of the Worlds Panic Myth"	51 minutes	November 19, 2020
1323	94	"Patty Hearst: Brainwashed or Bandit?"	60 minutes	November 24, 2020
1324	95	"Gobble Gobble: Turkeys!"	51 minutes	November 26, 2020
1325	96	"Cabbage Patch Kids: Must-Have Toy of the Century"	54 minutes	December 1, 2020
1326	97	"John Lennon and the FBI"	47 minutes	December 3, 2020
1327	98	"How Class Action Lawsuits Work"	54 minutes	December 8, 2020
1328	99	"The Taliesin Massacre"	47 minutes	December 10, 2020
1329	100	"Joseph Merrick, aka "The Elephant Man""	49 minutes	December 15, 2020
1330	101	"Aspirin: The Wonder Drug"	52 minutes	December 17, 2020
1331	102	"How Buffets Work"	62 minutes	December 22, 2020
1332	103	"The SYSK 2020 Holly Jolly Extravaganza!"	42 minutes	December 24, 2020
1333	104	"Theremins: World's First Electronic Music"	56 minutes	December 29, 2020
1334	105	"La Dame de Fer (Eiffel Tower)"	53 minutes	December 31, 2020

=== Short Stuff (2020) ===
No. in series	No. in season	Title	Length	Original air date
65	1	"Short Stuff: Why Does Time Speed Up As You Age?"	16 minutes	January 1, 2020
66	2	"Short Stuff: Corduroy"	15 minutes	January 8, 2020
67	3	"Short Stuff: The Mona Lisa"	15 minutes	January 15, 2020
68	4	"Short Stuff: Byford Dolphin Incident"	15 minutes	January 22, 2020
69	5	"Short Stuff: The O.K. Corral"	14 minutes	January 29, 2020
70	6	"Short Stuff: The Iowa Caucus"	16 minutes	February 5, 2020
71	7	"Short Stuff: Body Under The Bed"	13 minutes	February 12, 2020
72	8	"Short Stuff: Mexican Jumping Beans"	14 minutes	February 19, 2020
73	9	"Short Stuff: Hawaiian Night Marchers"	11 minutes	February 26, 2020
74	10	"Short Stuff: Exclamation Points!"	15 minutes	March 4, 2020
75	11	"Short Stuff: Teresita Basa"	15 minutes	March 11, 2020
76	12	"Short Stuff: The Pledge of Allegiance"	15 minutes	March 18, 2020
77	13	"Short Stuff: Dagen H"	14 minutes	March 25, 2020
78	14	"Short Stuff: 666"	14 minutes	April 1, 2020
79	15	"Short Stuff: AAirpass"	16 minutes	April 8, 2020
80	16	"Short Stuff: Turning Down the Radio When You're Lost"	15 minutes	April 15, 2020
81	17	"Short Stuff: The NY Times Crossword"	15 minutes	April 22, 2020
82	18	"Short Stuff: Mullets: 'Nuff Said"	14 minutes	April 29, 2020
83	19	"Short Stuff: Gibtown: Sideshow Central"	15 minutes	May 6, 2020
84	20	"Short Stuff: Charley Horse"	13 minutes	May 13, 2020
85	21	"Short Stuff: Mary Had A Little Lamb"	15 minutes	May 20, 2020
86	22	"Short Stuff: Lawn Darts"	14 minutes	May 27, 2020
87	23	"Short Stuff: Disappearing Dirty Dancing Lake"	13 minutes	June 3, 2020
88	24	"Short Stuff: Foie Gras"	14 minutes	June 10, 2020
89	25	"Short Stuff: Haint Blue"	12 minutes	June 17, 2020
90	26	"Short Stuff: Nouns of assemblage... assemble!"	12 minutes	June 24, 2020
91	27	"Short Stuff: The Science of Funny Words"	15 minutes	July 1, 2020
92	28	"Short Stuff: The @ Symbol"	16 minutes	July 8, 2020
93	29	"Short Stuff: Centralia Coal Fire"	16 minutes	July 15, 2020
94	30	"Short Stuff: The Death of Billy the Kid"	17 minutes	July 22, 2020
95	31	"Short Stuff: Habsburg Jaw"	14 minutes	July 29, 2020
96	32	"Short Stuff: Jigsaw Puzzles"	16 minutes	August 5, 2020
97	33	"Short Stuff: The Return of Bill Gates!"	31 minutes	August 12, 2020
98	34	"Short Stuff: The Great American Coin Shortage of 2020"	14 minutes	August 19, 2020
99	35	"Short Stuff: Carrots and Your Eyes"	14 minutes	August 26, 2020
100	36	"Short Stuff: More Phrase Origins"	14 minutes	September 2, 2020
101	37	"Short Stuff: Streisand Effect"	16 minutes	September 9, 2020
102	38	"Short Stuff: Black Cowboys"	15 minutes	September 16, 2020
103	39	"Short Stuff: Petticoat Rulers"	13 minutes	September 23, 2020
104	40	"Short Stuff: That's A Head Scratcher"	12 minutes	September 30, 2020
105	41	"Short Stuff: Lying in State"	12 minutes	October 7, 2020
106	42	"Short Stuff: What is Latinx anyway?"	13 minutes	October 14, 2020
107	43	"Short Stuff: Haunted Real Estate"	13 minutes	October 21, 2020
108	44	"Short Stuff: Poe Toaster"	15 minutes	April 28, 2020
109	45	"Short Stuff: Fruit Flies, Why?"	12 minutes	November 4, 2020
110	46	"Short Stuff: Plastic Pink Flamingos"	13 minutes	November 11, 2020
111	47	"Short Stuff: Squirrel Nuts"	12 minutes	November 18, 2020
112	48	"Short Stuff: How Eyes In a Painting Follow You"	12 minutes	November 25, 2020
113	49	"Short Stuff: Pimento Cheese!"	15 minutes	December 2, 2020
114	50	"Short Stuff: Cramming"	14 minutes	December 9, 2020
115	51	"Short Stuff: Modern Funerals"	13 minutes	December 16, 2020
116	52	"Short Stuff: Chinese Food on Christmas"	13 minutes	December 23, 2020
117	53	"Short Stuff: Ig-pay Atin-lay (Sorry)"	13 minutes	December 30, 2020
