= List of Stuff You Should Know episodes (2017) =

This is a list of episodes from 2017 for the Stuff You Should Know podcast.

== 2017 season ==
No. in series	No. in season	Title	Length	Original air date
917	1	"How Feeding Babies Works: The Breast"	71 minutes	January 3, 2017
918	2	"How Feeding Babies Works: The Bottle"	73 minutes	January 5, 2017
919	3	"What's the deal with Baby Boomers?"	52 minutes	January 10, 2017
920	4	"How Watersheds Work"	32 minutes	January 12, 2017
921	5	"Are Artificial Sweeteners Really Bad For You?"	59 minutes	January 17, 2017
922	6	"How Soylent Works"	44 minutes	January 19, 2017
923	7	"How Dictators Work"	48 minutes	January 24, 2017
924	8	"How Pacifism Works (And Could It?)"	75 minutes	January 26, 2017
925	9	"Elastics: Where God and Science Smooch"	54 minutes	January 31, 2017
926	10	"What's the future of virtual sex?"	58 minutes	February 2, 2017
927	11	"The Quinoa Revolution!"	46 minutes	February 7, 2017
928	12	"Live from San Francisco: How Malls Work"	68 minutes	February 9, 2017
929	13	"Tardigrades: Nature's Cuddly, Indestructible Microanimal"	36 minutes	February 14, 2017
930	14	"The Black Panther Party"	67 minutes	February 16, 2017
931	15	"The ins and outs of the DEATH TAX"	52 minutes	February 21, 2017
932	16	"How Famines Work"	54 minutes	February 23, 2017
933	17	"How Free Speech Works"	67 minutes	February 28, 2017
934	18	"How Optical Illusions Work"	44 minutes	March 2, 2017
935	19	"History of the Trail of Tears, Part I"	56 minutes	March 7, 2017
936	20	"History of the Trail of Tears, Part II"	46 minutes	March 9, 2017
937	21	"Pain Scales: Yeeeow!"	47 minutes	March 14, 2017
938	22	"Southerners Aren’t Lazy and Dumb, They Just Had Hookworm"	52 minutes	March 16, 2017
939	23	"Solitary Confinement: Cruel and Unusual"	51 minutes	March 21, 2017
940	24	"How the Hyperloop Will Work"	65 minutes	March 23, 2017
941	25	"How Foreign Accent Syndrome Works"	51 minutes	March 28, 2017
942	26	"The Shroud Of Turin: No Ordinary Bed Sheet"	48 minutes	March 30, 2017
943	27	"Composting: Nature's Most Interesting Process"	55 minutes	April 4, 2017
944	28	"How Empathy Works"	56 minutes	April 6, 2017
945	29	"How Supreme Court Nominations Work"	49 minutes	April 11, 2017
946	30	"How Supervolcanoes Work"	34 minutes	April 13, 2017
947	31	"How Swearing Works"	52 minutes	April 20, 2017
948	32	"How the National Security Council Works"	57 minutes	April 25, 2017
949	33	"How Multiple Sclerosis Works"	46 minutes	April 27, 2017
950	34	"Some Nutso Fan Theories"	56 minutes	May 4, 2017
951	35	"How Itching Works"	48 minutes	May 9, 2017
952	36	"How Charismatic Megafauna Work"	50 minutes	May 11, 2017
953	37	"How Champagne Works"	63 minutes	May 16, 2017
954	38	"How the Aurora Borealis and Aurora Australis Work"	46 minutes	May 18, 2017
955	39	"Is a head transplant really a thing?"	47 minutes	May 23, 2017
956	40	"How Schoolhouse Rock Rocked: Featuring Bob Nastanovich of Pavement"	65 minutes	May 25, 2017
957	41	"Are Election Laws Designed to Suppress Voting?"	73 minutes	May 30, 2017
958	42	"The Stories Behind A Few Food Fads"	51 minutes	June 1, 2017
959	43	"How Coelacanths Work"	44 minutes	June 6, 2017
960	44	"Why Are Whale Strandings Still a Mystery?"	47 minutes	June 8, 2017
961	45	"How the Beagle Brigade Works"	53 minutes	June 13, 2017
962	46	"What was Camp X?"	53 minutes	June 15, 2017
963	47	"How Seed Banks Work"	55 minutes	June 20, 2017
964	48	"How Ketchup Works"	57 minutes	June 22, 2017
965	49	"Remembering Stonewall"	59 minutes	June 27, 2017
966	50	"How Standardized Patients Work"	54 minutes	June 29, 2017
967	51	"What exactly is stoicism?"	61 minutes	July 4, 2017
968	52	"Josh and Chuck's List of Horror Movies that Changed the Genre"	64 minutes	July 6, 2017
969	53	"Why is There a Battle Over Net Neutrality?"	65 minutes	July 11, 2017
970	54	"How Fever Dreams Work"	40 minutes	July 13, 2017
971	55	"Sunburn, Suntans and Sunscreen"	52 minutes	July 18, 2017
972	56	"All We Know About Guessing"	61 minute	July 20, 2017
973	57	"What is Ghost Fishing?"	48 minutes	July 25, 2017
974	58	"A Dry Look at Toilet Paper"	56 minutes	July 27, 2017
975	59	"How Public Broadcasting Works"	60 minutes	August 1, 2017
976	60	"Who Committed the 1912 Villisca Ax Murders?"	49 minutes	August 3, 2017
977	61	"Do motivational speakers motivate people?"	54 minutes	August 8, 2017
978	62	"How Bioarchaeology Works"	58 minutes	August 10, 2017
979	63	"How Stuttering Works"	54 minutes	August 15, 2017
980	64	"What's the deal with accents?"	60 minutes	August 17, 2017
981	65	"Is the Uncanny Valley Real?"	71 minutes	August 22, 2017
982	66	"How Personality Tests Work"	60 minutes	August 24, 2017
983	67	"A Lip-Smacking Look at Barbecue"	54 minutes	August 29, 2017
984	68	"How Satanism Works"	56 minutes	August 31, 2017
985	69	"The Baffling Case of the Body On Somerton Beach"	68 minutes	September 5, 2017
986	70	"Are crickets the future of food?"	47 minutes	September 7, 2017
987	71	"How Psychopaths Work"	51 minutes	September 12, 2017
988	72	"How the Secret Service Works"	57 minutes	September 14, 2017
989	73	"How Frogs Work"	54 minutes	September 19, 2017
990	74	"A Nostalgic Look at Crayons"	56 minutes	September 21, 2017
991	75	"How FOIA Works"	54 minutes	September 26, 2017
992	76	"How Nude Beaches Work"	49 minutes	September 28, 2017
993	77	"How Police Body Cameras Work"	48 minutes	October 3, 2017
994	78	"How Giraffes Work"	57 minutes	October 5, 2017
995	79	"How the Rolling Jubilee Works"	50 minutes	October 10, 2017
996	80	"How Buildering Works"	50 minutes	October 12, 2017
997	81	"SYSK Live: The DB Cooper Heist"	95 minutes	October 17, 2017
998	82	"How Internships Work"	42 minutes	October 19, 2017
999	83	"Episode 999: The Simpsons Spectacular Part I"	54 minutes	October 24, 2017
1000	84	"Episode 1,000: The Simpsons Spectacular Part II"	64 minutes	October 26, 2017
1001	85	"SYSK's 2017 Super Spooktacular!"	58 minutes	October 31, 2017
1002	86	"How Global Warming Works"	63 minutes	November 2, 2017
1003	87	"Movie Crush: Janet Varney on Tron"	54 minutes	November 3, 2017
1004	88	"Movie Crush: Tig Notaro on Mask"	75 minutes	November 3, 2017
1005	89	"How Restaurant Health Inspections Work"	58 minutes	November 7, 2017
1006	90	"What's permaculture all about?"	55 minutes	November 9, 2017
1007	91	"How the Flu Works"	54 minutes	November 14, 2017
1008	92	"Can movies be cursed?"	56 minutes	November 16, 2017
1009	93	"Bath Salts: Steer Clear"	44 minutes	November 21, 2017
1010	94	"What is nuclear forensics?"	51 minutes	November 23, 2017
1011	95	"How Toy Testing Works"	50 minutes	November 28, 2017
1012	96	"Cake: So Great. So, So Great"	73 minutes	November 30, 2017
1013	97	"How Vomit Phobia Works"	33 minutes	December 5, 2017
1014	98	"How Flight Attendants Work"	44 minutes	December 7, 2017
1015	99	"The Deal With Doulas"	41 minutes	December 12, 2017
1016	100	"How the Globe of Death Works"	46 minutes	December 14, 2017
1017	101	"Narcissism: But what about me?"	63 minutes	December 19, 2017
1018	102	"The 2017 SYSK Christmas Extravaganza!"	55 minutes	December 21, 2017
1019	103	"How the Seven Wonders of the Ancient World Works, Part I"	46 minutes	December 26, 2017
1020	104	"How the Seven Wonders of the Ancient World Works, Part II"	49 minutes	December 28, 2017
