= List of Stuff You Should Know episodes (2019) =

This is a list of episodes from 2019 for the Stuff You Should Know podcast.

== 2019 season ==
No. in series	No. in season	Title	Length	Original air date
1125	1	"Rockettes: Still Kicking After All These Years"	50 minutes	January 1, 2019
1126	2	"What was the Tunguska event?"	47 minutes	January 3, 2019
1127	3	"How the Spanish Flu Worked"	63 minutes	January 8, 2019
1128	4	"The Great Finger in the Wendy’s Chili Caper"	49 minutes	January 10, 2019
1129	5	"How Airbags Work"	45 minutes	January 15, 2019
1130	6	"The July 20th Plot to Assassinate Hitler"	52 minutes	January 17, 2019
1131	7	"SYSK Live: The Kellogg Brothers’ Wacky World of Health"	76 minutes	January 22, 2019
1132	8	"The Legend of Betsy Ross"	47 minutes	January 24, 2019
1133	9	"How Ping Pong Works"	62 minutes	January 29, 2019
1134	10	"How Central Park Works"	58 minutes	January 31, 2019
1135	11	"The Insidious Abuse of Stalking"	62 minutes	February 5, 2019
1136	12	"The True Story of BlacKkKlansman"	50 minutes	February 7, 2019
1137	13	"Could There Be A Loch Ness Monster?"	67 minutes	February 12, 2019
1138	14	"Elephants: The Best Animals?"	66 minutes	February 14, 2019
1139	15	"Yeti: The Asian Bigfoot"	50 minutes	February 19, 2019
1140	16	"How Galaxies Work"	51 minutes	February 21, 2019
1141	17	"The Science of Break-Ups"	65 minutes	February 26, 2019
1142	18	"Tuskegee Airmen: American Heroes"	52 minutes	February 28, 2019
1150	19	"What's the deal with ASMR?"	51 minutes	March 5, 2019
1143	20	"How Dyslexia Works"	48 minutes	March 7, 2019
1144	21	"The Case of Sacco and Vanzetti"	60 minutes	March 12, 2019
1145	22	"The Great Stink: The Stench So Bad They Gave It A Name"	40 minutes	March 14, 2019
1146	23	"Desert Survival: Josh and Chuck Save Your Tookus"	50 minutes	March 19, 2019
1147	24	"How Disgust Works"	59 minutes	March 21, 2019
1148	25	"How Druids Worked"	59 minutes	March 26, 2019
1149	26	"Etch A Sketch!"	44 minutes	March 28, 2019
1151	27	"How Rape Kits Work"	55 minutes	April 2, 2019
1152	28	"Were Nazis Drug-Fueled Crankheads?"	50 minutes	April 4, 2019
1153	29	"How Free Range Parenting Works"	56 minutes	April 9, 2019
1154	30	"How the Electric Chair Works"	65 minutes	April 11, 2019
1155	31	"How the Hoover Dam Works, Part I"	51 minutes	April 16, 2019
1156	32	"How the Hoover Dam Works, Part II"	47 minutes	April 18, 2019
1157	33	"Is birth order important?"	56 minutes	April 23, 2019
1158	34	"What Were Human Zoos?"	46 minutes	April 25, 2019
1159	35	"Michael Dillon: Trans Pioneer"	60 minutes	April 30, 2019
1160	36	"What Happens When the Government Thinks You're Dead?"	44 minutes	May 2, 2019
1161	37	"Remembering Live Aid"	57 minutes	May 7, 2019
1162	38	"Do Dietary Supplements Work?"	60 minutes	May 9, 2019
1163	39	"How Trampolines Work"	59 minutes	May 14, 2019
1164	40	"10ish Cases of Really Bad Luck"	55 minutes	May 16, 2019
1165	41	"How Crystals Work"	54 minutes	May 21, 2019
1166	42	"What was Tin Pan Alley?"	46 minutes	May 23, 2019
1167	43	"The Tylenol Murders, Part I"	50 minutes	May 28, 2019
1168	44	"The Tylenol Murders, Part II"	51 minutes	May 30, 2019
1169	45	"How Barcodes Work"	59 minutes	June 4, 2019
1170	46	"What is perfect pitch?"	48 minutes	June 6, 2019
1171	47	"What's the gig economy?"	48 minutes	June 11, 2019
1172	48	"How Area 51 Works"	56 minutes	June 13, 2019
1173	49	"How the Hygiene Hypothesis Works"	50 minutes	June 18, 2019
1174	50	"What happened to the Neanderthals?"	55 minutes	June 20, 2019
1175	51	"Planned Obsolescence: Engine of the Consumer Economy"	62 minutes	June 25, 2019
1176	52	"What is the Civil Air Patrol?"	50 minutes	June 27, 2019
1177	53	"Is photographic memory a real thing?"	50 minutes	June 2, 2019
1178	54	"How the Fairness Doctrine Worked"	58 minutes	June 4, 2019
1179	55	"Cleopatra: Ms. Understood"	56 minutes	June 9, 2019
1180	56	"How Sloths Work"	60 minutes	June 11, 2019
1181	57	"How Going to the Moon Works"	59 minutes	June 16, 2019
1182	58	"Sand Dunes: They Are What You Think They Are"	47 minutes	June 18, 2019
1183	59	"MOVE: Or When the Philly Police Dropped a Bomb on a Residential Neighborhood"	57 minutes	June 23, 2019
1184	60	"How Eyewitness Testimony Works(?)"	61 minutes	June 25, 2019
1185	61	"Will Deepfakes Ruin the World?"	49 minutes	April 30, 2019
1186	62	"What Were the BONE WARS?"	58 minutes	August 1, 2019
1187	63	"Iran-Contra Affair: Shady in the 80s, Part 1"	51 minutes	August 6, 2019
1188	64	"Iran-Contra Affair: Shady in the 80s, Part 2"	49 minutes	August 8, 2019
1189	65	"Solar Power: The Future or What?"	66 minutes	August 13, 2019
1190	66	"How Peyote Works"	46 minutes	August 15, 2019
1191	67	"Nuclear Semiotics: How to Talk to Future Humans"	59 minutes	August 20, 2019
1192	68	"How Ventriloquism Works"	54 minutes	August 22, 2019
1193	69	"A Brief Overview of Punk Rock"	57 minutes	August 27, 2019
1194	70	"The Rubik's Cube Episode"	54 minutes	August 29, 2019
1195	71	"Ed Gein: The Serial Killer's Serial Killer"	52 minutes	September 3, 2019
1196	72	"What's the deal with MSG?"	61 minutes	September 5, 2019
1197	73	"How Government Shutdowns Work"	58 minutes	September 10, 2019
1198	74	"Special Effects: A Short History"	60 minutes	September 12, 2019
1199	75	"The Skinny on Lyme Disease"	53 minutes	September 17, 2019
1200	76	"How the US Interstate System Works"	66 minutes	September 19, 2019
1201	77	"We Are Running Out of Sand and That Actually Matters"	51 minutes	September 24, 2019
1202	78	"What are paraphilias?"	57 minutes	September 26, 2019
1203	79	"Guardian Angels: Behind the Red Beret"	105 minutes	October 1, 2019
1204	80	"What were the Freedom Schools?"	51 minutes	October 3, 2019
1205	81	"How Environmental Psychology Works"	54 minutes	October 8, 2019
1206	82	"The Ins and Outs of Beekeeping"	69 minutes	October 10, 2019
1207	83	"How Project Blue Book Worked, Pt I"	46 minutes	October 15, 2019
1208	84	"How Project Blue Book Worked, Pt II"	49 minutes	October 17, 2019
1209	85	"What's the deal with subpoenas?"	56 minutes	October 22, 2019
1210	86	"How Historic Districts Work"	50 minutes	October 24, 2019
1211	87	"Where Did Trick-Or-Treating Come From?"	56 minutes	October 29, 2019
1212	88	"SYSK’s Scare Your Socks Off Halloween Spooktacular 2019"	40 minutes	October 31, 2019
1213	89	"How Ironman Triathlons Work"	61 minutes	November 6, 2019
1214	90	"Cockney Rhyming Slang: Beautiful Gibberish"	48 minutes	November 7, 2019
1215	91	"Augmented Reality: Coming Soon?"	63 minutes	November 12, 2019
1216	92	"NYC Water: An Engineering Marvel"	53 minutes	November 14, 2019
1217	93	"The Murder Mystery of Ötzi the Iceman"	58 minutes	November 19, 2019
1218	94	"What Makes a Must-Have Christmas Toy?"	54 minutes	November 21, 2019
1219	95	"How Carbon-14 Dating Works"	61 minutes	November 26, 2019
1220	96	"How Conversion Therapy Doesn't Work"	69 minutes	November 28, 2019
1221	97	"Did Climate Cause the Collapse of the Maya?"	49 minutes	December 3, 2019
1222	98	"What's a gap year anyway?"	57 minutes	December 5, 2019
1223	99	"Everything You Ever Wanted to Know About Gin"	54 minutes	December 10, 2019
1224	100	"How Anorexia and Bulimia Work"	65 minutes	December 12, 2019
1225	101	"MC Escher and His Trippy Art"	62 minutes	December 17, 2019
1226	102	"Cave Diving: Totally Nuts"	56 minutes	December 19, 2019
1227	103	"The SYSK Holiday Spectacular"	44 minutes	December 24, 2019
1228	104	"SYSK Live: Andre the Giant"	69 minutes	December 26, 2019
1229	105	"Are broken arrows a problem?"	54 minutes	December 31, 2019

=== Short Stuff (2019) ===
No. in series	No. in season	Title	Length	Original air date
14	1	"Short Stuff: Khipu"	17 minutes	January 2, 2019
15	2	"Short Stuff: How Often Do You Need To Change Your Oil?"	16 minutes	January 9, 2019
16	3	"Short Stuff: Olestra"	13 minutes	January 16, 2019
17	4	"Short Stuff: Johnny Appleseed"	14 minutes	January 30, 2019
18	5	"Short Stuff: Ellen Richards"	13 minutes	February 6, 2019
19	6	"Short Stuff: War of Jenkins' Ear"	14 minutes	February 13, 2019
20	7	"Short Stuff: Turbulence"	13 minutes	February 20, 2019
21	8	"Short Stuff: Black Loyalists"	14 minutes	February 27, 2019
22	9	"Short Stuff: Wigs in English Court"	14 minutes	March 6, 2019
23	10	"Short Stuff: Bedbugs"	14 minutes	March 13, 2019
24	11	"Short Stuff: The Sandman"	14 minutes	March 20, 2019
25	12	"Short Stuff: When Elvis Met Nixon"	16 minutes	March 27, 2019
26	13	"Short Stuff: Unspent Campaign Money"	13 minutes	April 3, 2019
27	14	"Short Stuff: Lake Peigneur"	15 minutes	April 10, 2019
28	15	"Short Stuff: Emu Wars"	14 minutes	April 17, 2019
29	16	"Short Stuff: Fear of Public Speaking"	14 minutes	April 24, 2019
30	17	"Short Stuff: The Number 23"	15 minutes	May 1, 2019
31	18	"Short Stuff: Nicknames"	15 minutes	May 8, 2019
32	19	"Short Stuff: Honorary Degrees"	15 minutes	May 15, 2019
33	20	"Short Stuff: James Polk, Disinterred"	14 minutes	May 22, 2019
34	21	"Short Stuff: Look-Alike Old Couples"	15 minutes	May 29, 2019
35	22	"Short Stuff: Robert Johnson and the Devil"	14 minutes	June 5, 2019
36	23	"Short Stuff: Smoke Signals"	16 minutes	June 12, 2019
37	24	"Short Stuff: Emperor Norton"	16 minutes	June 19, 2019
38	25	"Short Stuff: Prison Food"	13 minutes	June 26, 2019
39	26	"Short Stuff: Mitsuye Endo"	13 minutes	July 3, 2019
40	27	"Short Stuff: The Coconut Cult"	18 minutes	July 10, 2019
41	28	"Short Stuff: Yellow Rain"	14 minutes	July 17, 2019
42	29	"Short Stuff: Aristides de Sousa Mendes"	14 minutes	July 24, 2019
43	30	"Short Stuff: The Man Who Didn’t Eat for a Year"	14 minutes	July 31, 2019
44	31	"Short Stuff: Time Zones"	15 minutes	August 7, 2019
45	32	"Short Stuff: Petrichor"	14 minutes	August 14, 2019
46	33	"Short Stuff: Horseshoe Crab Blood"	15 minutes	August 21, 2019
47	34	"Short Stuff: Dead Bodies and Airline Codes"	15 minutes	August 28, 2019
48	35	"Short Stuff: Barbed Wire"	15 minutes	September 4, 2019
49	36	"Short Stuff: Papasan Chairs"	15 minutes	September 11, 2019
50	37	"Short Stuff: Scurvy"	15 minutes	September 18, 2019
51	38	"Short Stuff: Dare Stones"	17 minutes	September 25, 2019
52	39	"Short Stuff: Fish n' Chips"	15 minutes	October 2, 2019
53	40	"Short Stuff: The Devil's Den"	15 minutes	October 9, 2019
54	41	"Short Stuff: The Disappearance of Ambrose Bierce"	14 minutes	October 16, 2019
55	42	"Short Stuff: The Toxic Death of Gloria Ramirez"	14 minutes	October 23, 2019
56	43	"Short Stuff: Our Shortie Halloween Spooktacular"	14 minutes	October 30, 2019
57	44	"Short Stuff: The History of Paternity Testing"	13 minutes	November 6, 2019
58	45	"Short Stuff: The Conch Republic"	16 minutes	November 13, 2019
59	46	"Short Stuff: Backyard Burials"	15 minutes	November 20, 2019
60	47	"Short Stuff: Niagara Falls Dewatered"	17 minutes	November 27, 2019
61	48	"Short Stuff: Macadamia Nuts"	14 minutes	December 4, 2019
62	49	"Short Stuff: Whisky or Bourbon?"	15 minutes	December 11, 2019
63	50	"Short Stuff: Obituaries"	15 minutes	December 18, 2019
64	51	"Short Stuff: The Santa Claus Association"	15 minutes	December 25, 2019
