= List of Stuff You Should Know episodes (2011) =

This is a list of episodes from 2011 for the Stuff You Should Know podcast

== 2011 season ==
No. in series	No. in season	Title	Length	Original air date
282	1	"Should you not eat gluten?"	29 minutes	January 4, 2011
283	2	"How Antiques Work"	34 minutes	January 6, 2011
284	3	"Little, Fluffy Clouds"	33 minutes	January 11, 2011
285	4	"Does acupuncture work?"	34 minutes	January 13, 2011
286	5	"How the Mafia Works"	45 minutes	January 18, 2011
287	6	"Can oceans power the world?"	28 minutes	January 20, 2011
288	7	"What has the world’s deadliest venom?"	30 minutes	January 25, 2011
289	8	"How to Control a Riot"	38 minutes	January 27, 2011
290	9	"How Munchausen Syndrome Works"	38 minutes	February 1, 2011
291	10	"Scooby Dooby Doo, Where Are You?"	40 minutes	February 3, 2011
292	11	"How Bartering Works"	27 minutes	February 8, 2011
293	12	"How the Black Death Worked"	33 minutes	February 10, 2011
294	13	"How Blood Pattern Analysis Works"	36 minutes	February 15, 2011
295	14	"How Crime Scene Photography Works"	26 minutes	February 17, 2011
296	15	"How Tickling Works"	21 minutes	February 22, 2011
297	16	"What is stagflation?"	24 minutes	February 24, 2011
298	17	"Were U.S. citizens in Japanese internment camps?"	30 minutes	March 1, 2011
299	18	"How Fossils Work"	35 minutes	March 3, 2011
300	19	"Cults: Who is this “The Leader?”"	53 minutes	March 8, 2011
301	20	"Is it legal to sterilize addicts?"	37 minutes	March 10, 2011
302	21	"How Mummies Work"	39 minutes	March 15, 2011
303	22	"Why’s that dude in that dumpster?"	32 minutes	March 17, 2011
304	23	"How a Nuclear Meltdown Works"	35 minutes	March 22, 2011
305	24	"That Dang-old Goat Fell Over"	27 minutes	March 24, 2011
306	25	"How Igloos Work"	27 minutes	March 29, 2011
307	26	"SYSK Live from SXSW: How UFOs Work"	37 minutes	March 31, 2011
308	27	"Sherpas: Warm, Friendly Living"	30 minutes	April 5, 2011
309	28	"Does oil speculation increase gas prices?"	33 minutes	April 7, 2011
310	29	"How Molecular Gastronomy Works"	33 minutes	April 12, 2011
311	30	"How Exploitation Films Work"	49 minutes	April 14, 2011
312	31	"Shoo Fly Don’t Bother Me"	35 minutes	April 19, 2011
313	32	"How Wills Work"	37 minutes	April 21, 2011
314	33	"Do you stay conscious after being decapitated?"	29 minutes	April 26, 2011
315	34	"How Rollercoasters Work, Minus the Fun"	36 minutes	April 28, 2011
316	35	"How Parkour Works"	27 minutes	May 3, 2011
317	36	"A Podcast to Remember (How Memory Works)"	33 minutes	May 5, 2011
318	37	"What is mountaintop removal mining?"	48 minutes	May 10, 2011
319	38	"How Con Artists Work"	38 minutes	May 12, 2011
320	39	"Can the sun kill you?"	32 minutes	May 17, 2011
321	40	"What is parallel evolution?"	27 minutes	May 19, 2011
322	41	"What is terror management theory?"	26 minutes	May 24, 2011
323	42	"How do I start my own country?"	34 minutes	May 26, 2011
324	43	"How Nicotine Works"	33 minutes	May 31, 2011
325	44	"How Fear Works"	43 minutes	June 2, 2011
326	45	"How the Underground Railroad Worked"	35 minutes	June 7, 2011
327	46	"Was Malthus right about carrying capacity?"	24 minutes	June 9, 2011
328	47	"How Military Snipers Work"	37 minutes	June 14, 2011
329	48	"How Curiosity Works"	33 minutes	June 16, 2011
330	49	"How Suicide Bombers Work"	27 minutes	June 21, 2011
331	50	"How Shrunken Heads Work"	54 minutes	June 23, 2011
332	51	"How Asteroid Mining Could Work"	29 minutes	June 28, 2011
333	52	"Who was America’s first murderer?"	29 minutes	June 30, 2011
334	53	"How Hate Works"	35 minutes	July 5, 2011
335	54	"How Human Cannonballs Work"	28 minutes	July 7, 2011
336	55	"Stuff You Should Know July 4th Extravaganza, Part 1: Mom"	53 minutes	July 12, 2011
337	56	"Stuff You Should Know July 4th Extravaganza, Part 2: Baseball and Apple Pie"	51 minutes	July 14, 2011
338	57	"Does smiling make you happy?"	28 minutes	July 19, 2011
339	58	"How Karma Works"	32 minutes	July 21, 2011
340	59	"How Wildfires Work"	31 minutes	July 26, 2011
341	60	"How SPAM Works"	38 minutes	July 28, 2011
342	61	"Can you sweat colors?"	24 minutes	August 2, 2011
343	62	"Ethnobotany: How to Get Drugs from Plants"	38 minutes	August 4, 2011
344	63	"What’s the future of the internet?"	39 minutes	August 9, 2011
345	64	"Laughter: What’s so funny about that?"	42 minutes	August 11, 2011
346	65	"How Murphy’s Law Works, the Redux"	30 minutes	August 16, 2011
347	66	"How to Land on a Government Watch List"	32 minutes	August 18, 2011
348	67	"How Schizophrenia Works"	42 minutes	August 23, 2011
349	68	"The Cheesiest SYSK Episode Ever"	43 minutes	August 25, 2011
350	69	"Cryonics: Hi, Frozen Body!"	42 minutes	August 30, 2011
351	70	"How Lie Detectors Work"	27 minutes	September 1, 2011
352	71	"10 Scientists Who Were Their Own Guinea Pigs"	41 minutes	September 6, 2011
353	72	"How the World Trade Center Memorial Works"	43 minutes	September 8, 2011
354	73	"How Casinos Work"	42 minutes	September 13, 2011
355	74	"How the Moon Works"	38 minutes	September 15, 2011
356	75	"How Acne Works"	41 minutes	September 20, 2011
357	76	"How Family Crests Work"	47 minutes	September 22, 2011
358	77	"How Sword Swallowing Works"	33 minutes	September 27, 2011
359	78	"How U.S. Marshals Work"	30 minutes	September 29, 2011
360	79	"How Silly Putty Works"	36 minutes	October 4, 2011
361	80	"How the Peace Corps Works"	42 minutes	October 6, 2011
362	81	"A Podcast on Zoot Suits? Yes"	33 minutes	October 11, 2011
363	82	"The Wind Cries Typhoid Mary"	35 minutes	October 13, 2011
364	83	"The Nile IS Just a River in Egypt"	33 minutes	October 18, 2011
365	84	"Do you lose the right to privacy when you die?"	34 minutes	October 20, 2011
366	85	"How Anti-matter Spacecraft Will Work"	42 minutes	October 25, 2011
367	86	"Berenice"	45 minutes	October 27, 2011
368	87	"How the Autobahn Works"	53 minutes	November 1, 2011
369	88	"What Saved the American Bison"	54 minutes	November 3, 2011
370	89	"How Gene Patents Work"	41 minutes	November 8, 2011
371	90	"How Presidential Debates Work"	35 minutes	November 10, 2011
372	91	"How Alcatraz Works"	40 minutes	November 15, 2011
373	92	"How Air Force One Works"	31 minutes	November 17, 2011
374	93	"Crossbows: They Look Cool"	24 minutes	November 22, 2011
375	94	"How Thoroughbred Horses Work"	36 minutes	November 24, 2011
376	95	"Cash Debit or Credit: Which is best?"	27 minutes	November 29, 2011
377	96	"What made the donkey and the elephant political?"	33 minutes	December 1, 2011
378	97	"How Daylight Saving Time Works"	33 minutes	December 6, 2011
379	98	"How the Digestive System Works"	45 minutes	December 8, 2011
380	99	"How McCarthyism Works"	40 minutes	December 13, 2011
381	100	"How Earthworms Work"	42 minutes	December 15, 2011
382	101	"How Pepper Spray Works"	34 minutes	December 20, 2011
383	102	"Josh and Chuck’s Christmas Extravaganza"	41 minutes	December 22, 2011
384	103	"What happens in the brain during an orgasm?"	38 minutes	December 27, 2011
385	104	"Coffee: The World’s Drug of Choice"	51 minutes	December 29, 2011
