= List of Stuff You Should Know episodes (2009) =

This is a list of episodes from 2009 for the Stuff You Should Know podcast.

== 2009 season ==
No. in series	No. in season	Title	Length	Original air date
74	1	"How Midnight Regulations Work"	24 minutes	January 1, 2009
75	2	"How Exorcism Works"	18 minutes	January 6, 2009
76	3	"How Body Armor Works: A Special Request"	17 minutes	January 8, 2009
77	4	"What are urban explorers?"	16 minutes	January 13, 2009
78	5	"How Redheads Work"	16 minutes	January 15, 2009
79	6	"Recycling and the Great Pacific Garbage Patch"	24 minutes	January 20, 2009
80	7	"How Moonshine Works"	24 minutes	January 22, 2009
81	8	"How Comas Work"	24 minutes	January 27, 2009
82	9	"How Hypoallergenic Cats Work"	15 minutes	January 29, 2009
83	10	"Why do some people believe the moon landings were a hoax?"	18 minutes	February 3, 2009
84	11	"Why is it so hard to say “toy boat” three times fast?"	17 minutes	February 5, 2009
85	12	"How long can you go without food and water?"	22 minutes	February 10, 2009
86	13	"How Friday the 13th Works"	21 minutes	February 12, 2009
87	14	"How Squatting Works"	21 minutes	February 17, 2009
88	15	"How Going Over Niagara Works"	26 minutes	February 19, 2009
89	16	"Can people really die of fright?"	17 minutes	February 24, 2009
90	17	"How Junk Mail Works"	19 minutes	February 26, 2009
91	18	"Could a ‘thinking cap’ make me a genius?"	20 minutes	March 3, 2009
92	19	"Who owns the oceans?"	23 minutes	March 10, 2009
93	20	"How Aphrodisiacs Work"	21 minutes	March 12, 2009
94	21	"What are microexpressions?"	17 minutes	March 17, 2009
95	22	"Can anger be a good thing?"	19 minutes	March 19, 2009
96	23	"How Déjà Vu Works"	24 minutes	March 24, 2009
97	24	"Are there dead bodies on Mount Everest?"	25 minutes	March 26, 2009
98	25	"Is the world going to end in 2012?"	24 minutes	March 31, 2009
99	26	"Bizarre Ways to Die"	21 minutes	April 2, 2009
100	27	"How can some centenarians lead unhealthy lives?"	25 minutes	April 7, 2009
101	28	"How Ponzi Schemes Work"	26 minutes	April 9, 2009
102	29	"How Money Laundering Works"	26 minutes	April 14, 2009
103	30	"Do toads cause warts?"	22 minutes	April 16, 2009
104	31	"How much money do I really need to live?"	22 minutes	April 21, 2009
105	32	"How Face Transplants Work"	24 minutes	April 23, 2009
106	33	"Is high fructose corn syrup bad for you?"	18 minutes	April 28, 2009
107	34	"How do credit default swaps work?"	21 minutes	April 30, 2009
108	35	"Why do humans have body hair?"	21 minutes	May 5, 2009
109	36	"How can a lake explode?"	24 minutes	May 7, 2009
110	37	"What causes rigor mortis?"	19 minutes	May 12, 2009
111	38	"Is it better to buy local or organic food?"	29 minutes	May 14, 2009
112	39	"How Lobotomies Work"	32 minutes	May 19, 2009
113	40	"Do animals have a sixth sense?"	20 minutes	May 21, 2009
114	41	"How Propaganda Works"	34 minutes	May 26, 2009
115	42	"Is spontaneous human combustion real?"	20 minutes	May 28, 2009
116	43	"What’s a brownfield remediation project?"	18 minutes	June 2, 2009
117	44	"How Biohydrocarbons Work"	24 minutes	June 4, 2009
118	45	"How did Nikola Tesla change the way we use energy?"	26 minutes	June 9, 2009
119	46	"How Carbon Capture and Storage Works"	29 minutes	June 11, 2009
120	47	"Three Innovations We Need Right Now"	26 minutes	June 16, 2009
121	48	"What exactly is the Peter Principle?"	23 minutes	June 18, 2009
122	49	"Can you control your dreams?"	26 minutes	June 23, 2009
123	50	"How Body Dysmorphic Disorder Works"	24 minutes	June 25, 2009
124	51	"How Earthquakes Work"	26 minutes	June 30, 2009
125	52	"How can hypermiling save you gas?"	22 minutes	July 2, 2009
126	53	"Is it possible to brainwash someone?"	27 minutes	July 7, 2009
127	54	"How Twinkies Work"	25 minutes	July 9, 2009
128	55	"How has toxoplasma turned the world into zombies?"	20 minutes	July 14, 2009
129	56	"What is a body farm?"	25 minutes	July 16, 2009
130	57	"Are stupid people happier?"	21 minutes	July 21, 2009
131	58	"Three Gross Parasites"	28 minutes	July 23, 2009
132	59	"What are tinnovators?"	24 minutes	July 28, 2009
133	60	"How Whale Sharks Work"	27 minutes	July 30, 2009
134	61	"How Agent Orange Worked"	25 minutes	August 4, 2009
135	62	"What’s up with competitive eating?"	28 minutes	August 6, 2009
136	63	"What are Japanese stragglers?"	29 minutes	August 11, 2009
137	64	"Is fluoride making us stupid?"	26 minutes	August 13, 2009
138	65	"What’s sarcopenia and what can you do about it?"	22 minutes	August 18, 2009
139	66	"Is the Necronomicon real?"	30 minutes	August 20, 2009
140	67	"How easy is it to steal a nuclear bomb?"	26 minutes	August 25, 2009
141	68	"How Muppets Work"	32 minutes	August 27, 2009
142	69	"Why is the U.S. so dependent on cars?"	30 minutes	September 1, 2009
143	70	"What is an Ig Nobel Prize?"	23 minutes	September 3, 2009
144	71	"What is geocaching?"	27 minutes	September 8, 2009
145	72	"Could microlending develop the world?"	27 minutes	September 10, 2009
146	73	"How Health Care in the United States Works Right Now"	31 minutes	September 15, 2009
147	74	"How do dogs perceive time?"	25 minutes	September 17, 2009
148	75	"President Obama’s Health Care Plan: Soup to Nuts"	29 minutes	September 22, 2009
149	76	"Do zombies really exist?"	36 minutes	September 24, 2009
150	77	"Rumors, Myths and Truths Behind Obama’s Health Care Plan"	34 minutes	September 29, 2009
151	78	"Is Bhutan on to something with Gross National Happiness?"	33 minutes	October 1, 2009
152	79	"Health Care Systems Around the World"	32 minutes	October 6, 2009
153	80	"Who were the first Americans?"	29 minutes	October 8, 2009
154	81	"How to Find the History of Your House"	26 minutes	October 13, 2009
155	82	"What is a hangover, really?"	31 minutes	October 15, 2009
156	83	"What is China’s one-child policy?"	25 minutes	October 20, 2009
157	84	"How the Cannonball Run Worked"	30 minutes	October 22, 2009
158	85	"How Witness Protection Works"	26 minutes	October 27, 2009
159	86	"The Real How Jack the Ripper Worked"	39 minutes	October 29, 2009
160	87	"Can you remember being born?"	26 minutes	November 3, 2009
161	88	"How Product Placement Works"	33 minutes	November 5, 2009
162	89	"How will the future crime database work?"	28 minutes	November 10, 2009
163	90	"How Population Works"	28 minutes	November 12, 2009
164	91	"What’s the deal with totem poles?"	20 minutes	November 17, 2009
165	92	"10 Odd Town Festivals"	26 minutes	November 19, 2009
166	93	"What is Mutual Assured Destruction?"	24 minutes	November 24, 2009
167	94	"How Hostage Negotiation Works"	28 minutes	November 26, 2009
168	95	"How Food Cravings Work"	29 minutes	December 1, 2009
169	96	"How Near-Death Experiences Work"	26 minutes	December 3, 2009
170	97	"Will the Large Hadron Collider destroy the Earth?"	34 minutes	December 8, 2009
171	98	"How the Hells Angels Work"	34 minutes	December 10, 2009
172	99	"How Narco States Work"	31 minutes	December 15, 2009
173	100	"How Kleptomania Works"	25 minutes	December 17, 2009
174	101	"Do concussions cause early death?"	26 minutes	December 22, 2009
175	102	"How Christmas Worked"	27 minutes	December 24, 2009
176	103	"How Pirates Work"	32 minutes	December 29, 2009
177	104	"How Human Experimentation Works"	27 minutes	December 31, 2009
