= The Best of Me (Sedaris book) =

2020 essay and fiction collection by David Sedaris

- First edition
- Author: David Sedaris
- Cover artist: Jamie Keenan
- Language: English
- Genre: Essay collection, fiction
- Publisher: Little, Brown and Company
- Publication date: November 3, 2020
- Publication place: United States
- Media type: Print (hardcover)
- Pages: 388
- ISBN: 978-0-316-62824-2
- Preceded by: Calypso
- Followed by: A Carnival of Snackeries: Diaries: Volume Two (2003-2020)

The Best of Me is a compilation of essays and short fiction by American humorist David Sedaris. It was released by Little, Brown and Company on November 3, 2020, with every entry in the collection selected by Sedaris himself. All of the works had previously appeared in earlier books by Sedaris, save for five essays which had only been published in The New Yorker.

The book was praised by various publications upon its release. The New York Times and The Christian Science Monitor both asserted that it showcased Sedaris's growth as a writer over the years, from someone who found humor in cruelty and in showcasing outrageous characters, into someone who wrote more personal stories about love, family, and growing old. Both the hardcover and paperback releases of The Best of Me spent time on The New York Times Best Seller list.

== Background ==
In his introduction to The Best of Me, David Sedaris states that every work included in the collection is the sort that he hoped to be able to produce when he first started writing at age 20. He also notes that he is always inclined toward his more recent material, as he has had less time to turn against it. At the time of publication, he revealed in an interview with WBUR that there was one particular story he had decidedly turned against: his famous essay "Santaland Diaries," which he eulogized by saying "I actually excluded it and I wanted its feelings to be hurt."

Talking to the Houston Chronicle, Sedaris explained that lots of his older work makes him cringe, and that even essays which were only a decade old could surprise him with how dated they are. The Best of Me includes only one entry each from 1994's Barrel Fever and 1997's Naked.

Sedaris further told WBUR that the book was originally intended to only be an audio collection, and his process of choosing what to include was as simple as considering which ones he looked forward to reading out loud. He did not embark on a book tour to accompany The Best of Me's publication, and he told Entertainment Weekly that with a collection of preexisting material, he felt less pressure to reach No. 1 on The New York Times Best Seller list.

== Essays ==
The Best of Me is mostly composed of works that previously appeared in other books by Sedaris. Five essays whose inclusion marks their first time in a Sedaris collection are indicated by N/A in the "Previously appeared in" column, although all five were originally published in The New Yorker between 1996 and 2020.

Work	Previously appeared in	Note
Glen's Homophobia Newsletter Vol. 3, No. 2	Barrel Fever	
Front Row Center with Thaddeus Bristol	Holidays on Ice	
Christmas Means Giving	Holidays on Ice	
The Incomplete Quad	Naked	
Girl Crazy	N/A	
Card Wired	N/A	
How to Spend the Budget Surplus	N/A	
You Can't Kill the Rooster	Me Talk Pretty One Day	
Me Talk Pretty One Day	Me Talk Pretty One Day	
Jesus Shaves	Me Talk Pretty One Day	
Dog Days	Let's Explore Diabetes with Owls	
Us and Them	Dress Your Family in Corduroy and Denim	
Let It Snow	Dress Your Family in Corduroy and Denim	
The Ship Shape	Dress Your Family in Corduroy and Denim	
Repeat After Me	Dress Your Family in Corduroy and Denim	
Six to Eight Black Men	Dress Your Family in Corduroy and Denim	
Possession	Dress Your Family in Corduroy and Denim	
Nuit of the Living Dead	Dress Your Family in Corduroy and Denim	
Solution to Saturday's Puzzle	When You Are Engulfed in Flames	
The Understudy	When You Are Engulfed in Flames	
Town and Country	When You Are Engulfed in Flames	
In the Waiting Room	When You Are Engulfed in Flames	
Undecided	N/A	
The Cat and the Baboon	Squirrel Seeks Chipmunk	
The Motherless Bear	Squirrel Seeks Chipmunk	
The Faithful Setter	Squirrel Seeks Chipmunk	
Dentists Without Borders	Let's Explore Diabetes with Owls	
Memory Laps	Let's Explore Diabetes with Owls	
Think Differenter	Let's Explore Diabetes with Owls	
Loggerheads	Let's Explore Diabetes with Owls	
If I Ruled the World	Let's Explore Diabetes with Owls	
Easy, Tiger	Let's Explore Diabetes with Owls	
Laugh, Kookaburra	Let's Explore Diabetes with Owls	
Just a Quick E-Mail	Let's Explore Diabetes with Owls	
A Guy Walks into a Bar Car	Let's Explore Diabetes with Owls	
Standing By	Let's Explore Diabetes with Owls	
Understanding Understanding Owls	Let's Explore Diabetes with Owls	
Now We Are Five	Calypso	
A House Divided	Calypso	
The Perfect Fit	Calypso	
Leviathan	Calypso	
A Modest Proposal	Calypso	
Why Aren't You Laughing?	Calypso	
The Spirit World	Calypso	
Unbuttoned	N/A	Later appeared in Happy-Go-Lucky

== Reception ==
Upon its release in November 2020, The Best of Me became an Editors' Choice for The New York Times Book Review, and it was named Best Book of the Month by both CNN and The Christian Science Monitor. It spent three weeks on The New York Times Best Seller List for Hardcover Nonfiction, and its 2021 paperback edition remained on the Best Seller List for Paperback Nonfiction sixteen weeks in a row.

Writing for The New York Times, author Andrew Sean Greer called The Best of Me "the best thing Sedaris has ever written." He applauded the author's decision to craft a collection of personal stories about love and family, rather than a "rock-star journey" that included famous works like "Santaland Diaries." Greer further asserted that the book revealed Sedaris's growth, maturing from a writer who once found humor in cruelty into someone who could see it in the sorrow and happiness of growing old.

Heller McAlpin of The Christian Science Monitor also praised the work, similarly highlighting its progression from "outrageous, escalating rants of unhinged characters" into more personal material. Kirkus Reviews declared it "one of the funniest—and truest—books in recent memory" and commended Sedaris's stories for always including "a perfectly formed crystallization of our various embarrassments and discomforts".

Greer and McAlpin both recommended the work to new and old Sedaris readers alike, with Greer suggesting that "enough time has passed to find humor in the hardest parts of life" and McAlpin calling it "a terrific highlights reel". Kirkus Reviews additionally named it "a must-have for fans of the poet laureate of human foibles".

The Best of Me's cover art, by Jamie Keenan, was included in LitHub's "The 10 Best Book Covers of November" list, with writer Emily Temple finding it to be, like Sedaris himself, "erudite, irreverent, playful, and ever-so-slightly... threatening." She elaborated by visually comparing it to a ransom letter.
