= List of 1995 This American Life episodes =

In 1995, there were seven new This American Life episodes; all were broadcast under the original name of the program Your Radio Playhouse.

- Episode 1 – "New Beginnings"

Air Date: 1995-11-17
Description: Our program's very first broadcast
- Prologue – Ira Glass seeks advice from long-time talk show host Joe Franklin. (6 minutes)

Interlude: Dinah Washington – "Destination Moon"

- Act 1 – Kevin Kelly (23 minutes)

Kevin Kelly has a sort of religious experience in Jerusalem and decides to live the next six months of his life to the fullest. This plot was revisited for episode 50 – Shoulda Been Dead

- Act 2 – Ira Glass (7 minutes)

Ira calls his parents in for advice about broadcasting.

- Act 3 – Lawrence Steger (13 minutes)

Steger recounts a road trip he and a friend took after hearing about Steger's HIV diagnosis.
Interlude: The Treniers – "(Uh-Oh) Get Out of the Car"

- Act 4 – Ed Ryder, interviewed by Ira Glass and Nancy Updike (9 minutes)

Ryder was wrongly imprisoned for twenty years and recently released, and he discusses dream of playing music. Ryder performs "God Bless the Child"—this performance was re-broadcast in episode 119 – Lock-Up.
Interlude: Django Reinhardt – "I've Had My Moments"

- Episode 2 – "Small Scale Sin"

Air Date: 1995-11-24
Description: Small-scale stories on the nature of small-scale sin
- Prologue – Ira Glass visits the Hackers On Planet Earth conference and talks to three teenagers who committed credit card fraud tell their stories. (16 minutes)
- Act 1

Playwright Jeff Dorchen writes a play about the previous act. (10 minutes)

- Act 2 – Ira Glass interviews Michael Warr

Poet Warr discusses his childhood as a Jehovah's Witness. (8 minutes)

- Act 3

A member of the hacking group MOD discusses his arrest and imprisonment and his success as a criminal. (26 minutes)

- Episode 3 – "Poultry Slam"

Air Date: 1995-12-01
Description: Stories decrying the wonders of turkeys, chickens, and other fowl
- Act 1

Danielle explains why her family calls chicken "fish" at the dinner table. (20 minutes)
Interlude: Louis Jordan – "Saturday Night Fish Fry"

- Act 2

Julie discusses life on a turkey farm (8 minutes)

- Act 3 – Luis Rodriguez

Rodriguez reads a poem about poultry. (4 minutes)
Interlude: Cab Calloway – "A Chicken Ain't Nothing But a Bird"

- Act 4 – Verda Mae Cosgrove

The hostess of NPR's Seasonings explains how to cook a chicken. (6 minutes)
Interlude: Charles Mingus – "Eat That Bird"

- Act 5 – David Sedaris

Sedaris buys a taxidermied turkey. (3 minutes)

- Act 6 – Ira Glass

Glass presents the first new episode of the WCFL radio program "Chickenman" since 1969. (8 minutes)

- Episode 4 – "Vacations"

Air Date: 1995-12-08
Description: Stories about vacations gone awry—or perhaps vacations that never should have happened
- Prologue – Ira Glass

Ira discusses his family photos from a trip to Hawaii. (9 minutes)

- Act 1 – Sandra Tsing Loh

Loh reads a story about her family vacation in Ethiopia. (22 minutes)

- Act 2 – David Sedaris

Sedaris discusses hitchhiking. (25 minutes)
Interlude: Ozark Mountain Devils – "If You Wanna Get to Heaven"

- Episode 5 – "Anger & Forgiveness"

Air Date: 1995-12-15
Description: Stories that reveal the societal "trend" toward anger and away from genuine forgiveness
Prologue – Ira Glass

Glass reads a list of words that Newt Gingrich advised Republicans use when referring to Democrats. (7 minutes)

- Act 1 – Jack Hitt

Hitt is confronted by someone who read an article he wrote about Susan Smith. (15 minutes)

- Act 2 – Iris Moore and Larry Steeger

Moore and Steeger give monologues about forgiveness. (9 minutes)
Interlude: Unknown artist – "I Blame God"

- Act 3 – Darrin Bowden

Bowden explains the effects of harsh criminal sentences on minors. (6 minutes)
Interlude: Johnny Cash – "The Wall"

- Act 4 – Ira Glass

Glass interviews Glen Fitzgerald, a Christian missionary who works with gang members. (9 minutes)
Interlude: Johnny Cash – "Folsom Prison Blues"

- Act 5 – Cheryl Trykv

A story read before a live audience about someone who doesn't want forgiveness. (14 minutes)

- Episode 6 – "Christmas"

Air Date: 1995-12-22
Description: Several Christmas-themed performances
- Prologue – David Sedaris

A Christmas radio play with Sedaris and the Pinetree Gang. (28 minutes)

- Act 1 – Beau O'Reilly

A Christmas tree story. (14 minutes)

- Act 2 – Reginald Gibbons

A story about Christmas at juvenile court. (10 minutes)

- Act 3 – Peter Clowney

Christmas at the Faith Tabernacle Baptist Church, whose choir provides music for the entire episode. (9 minutes)

- Episode 7 – "Quitting"

Air Date: 1995-12-29
Description: Stories of people who quit everything in their lives that they hated—and what happened to them afterwards
- Prologue – Ira Glass

Evan Harris starts the magazine Quitter Quarterly with Shelley Ross (22 minutes)
Interlude: Ella Fitzgerald – "Don't Fence Me In"

- Act 1 – Sandra Tsing Loh

Loh reads a story about quitting. (10 minutes)
Interlude: Brave Combo – "Do Something Different (Disappear)"

- Act 2 – Ira Glass

Glass plays excerpts from Shut Up, Little Man! (9 minutes)

- Act 3 – Lisa Buscani

A story about being unable to quit. (13 minutes)
Interlude: Robert Metrick – "The Calendar Song"

- Act 4 – Dwight Okita and Ira Glass

Okita reads the poem "Farewell Samba" from his book Crossing with the Light and Glass reads Philip Larkin's "Poetry of Departures". (3 minutes)
