= Naked (book) =

1997 essay collection by David Sedaris

- First edition
- Author: David Sedaris
- Cover artist: Jacket design by Chip Kidd
- Language: English
- Genre: Essay collection
- Publisher: Little, Brown and Company
- Publication date: March 17, 1997
- Publication place: United States
- Media type: Print (hardback and paperback)
- Pages: 291 pp (first edition, hardcover)
- ISBN: 0-316-77949-0 (first edition, hardcover)
- OCLC: 35741397
- Dewey Decimal: 818/.5402 B 21
- LC Class: PS3569.E314 Z469 1997
- Preceded by: Barrel Fever
- Followed by: Holidays on Ice

Naked is a 1997 essay collection by American humorist David Sedaris. His second book after 1994's Barrel Fever, it details his life, from his unusual upbringing in the suburbs of Raleigh, North Carolina, to his booze-and-drug-ridden college years, to his Kerouacian wanderings as a young adult. Many of the essays originated from his time on NPR's This American Life but were rewritten for publication to include more "unpleasant mental pictures." Naked was released by Little, Brown and Company, and it reached No. 6 on the New York Times best-seller list for Hardcover nonfiction.

The book was acclaimed for its wit and dark humor, with especial praise heaped on the stories about Sedaris's family, and particularly his portrayal of his mother in the months leading up to her death. A New York Times review found Sedaris to be in transition from the style of Barrel Fever, ambitiously revealing himself to the reader via the sour pain that lurked beneath many of his jokes. In 1998, Naked won the Randy Shilts Award for Gay Non-Fiction from Publishing Triangle, and two of its essays were reprinted in later collections of Sedaris's.

== Background ==
After the success of his 1994 debut book Barrel Fever, David Sedaris was thrust into the public spotlight. He initially held onto his apartment-cleaning job in New York City, but when working on Naked, his followup essay collection, he regretfully quit the gig to focus on writing. Not wanting to be cooped up at home all day, he wrote the book in a variety of places, including France, Chicago, the Yaddo artists' community, and the nudist colony that informs the titular essay "Naked."

Much of Naked is about Sedaris's family and childhood in Raleigh, North Carolina. When asked how much of it was true, he admitted that he could not perfectly remember twenty-year-old conversations, and that he tended to be prone to exaggeration. However, he operated from the principle that real life was hard to beat when thinking about "really real absurdity," and that a middle class suburban upbringing was, to a writer, "just as rich as any other experience."

Although he slightly tweaked his family in his presentation of them, Sedaris believed that he needed to start with the honest truth of everything before he blew it up, or else it would feel empty. He also maintained that his mother was presented "pretty much verbatim," and that the diary he had been keeping for decades helped him write truthfully about his father. He enjoyed the challenge of writing about his mother's death, as he aimed to distinguish it from the plethora of existing stories by people who had also lost mothers to cancer.

Sedaris also hoped to tell a new and unique tale with his coming out story "I Like Guys," as it was another topic that he felt had already been covered by a bevy of other writers. He believed that his sexual orientation was part of but not exclusively what he was, and he intended that Naked be "an honest reflection of the kind of homo that I am." His main goal with the book was to get laughs, even if most of the stories were not about him being gay.

Sedaris has said that many of the stories he tells in Naked came originally from his work with NPR, but he was not allowed to paint any kind of unpleasant mental picture while on the radio. For the book, he thus re-wrote various stories and "put those unpleasant mental pictures back in."

== Contents ==
1. "Chipped Beef"
  - About the early life of the Sedaris family and David's hopes to one day be rich and famous. It is revealed that the family is actually middle class.
2. "A Plague of Tics"
  - As a child, David develops nervous tics and obsessive-compulsive habits, like licking light switches and kissing newspapers.
3. "Get Your Ya-Ya's Out!"
  - Ya-Ya, David's mildly senile grandmother, comes to live with the family after suffering an injury.
4. "Next of Kin"
  - David finds a pornographic novel, which circulates among his siblings until their mother confiscates and reads it.
5. "Cyclops"
  - David relates cautionary tales passed down from his relatives.
6. "The Women's Open"
  - David's sister has her first menses while at a golf championship.
7. "True Detective"
  - David's mother and sister are engrossed in detective television shows such as The Fugitive, and David undertakes some amateur detective work.
8. "Dix Hill"
  - David volunteers at the Dorothea Dix Hospital in Raleigh, where the residents' behavior ranges from submissive to violent.
9. "I Like Guys"
  - While at the Ionian Village, a summer camp in Greece, a teenage David realizes that he's gay when he develops a crush on a fellow camper.
10. "The Drama Bug"
  - David attempts acting after being introduced to Shakespeare by an actor's visit to his classroom. David finds that the playwright's florid Elizabethan language appeals to him, and starts to speak with a British accent.
11. "Dinah, the Christmas Whore"
  - Teenage David works at a cafeteria during his Christmas break. He and sister Lisa try to extricate a coworker from a domestic disturbance in the slums of Raleigh.
12. "Planet of the Apes"
  - David begins hitchhiking after he sees the film Planet of the Apes.
13. "The Incomplete Quad"
  - David lives in a dormitory for disabled students at Kent State University. He and a quadriplegic woman hitchhike while posing as newlyweds.
14. "C.O.G."
  - David gets a job cutting stone into clocks in the shape of Oregon. He teams up with a coworker who describes himself as a "COG" (Child of God), and they try to sell their stones at local craft fairs.
15. "Something for Everyone"
  - David refurbishes an apartment complex owned by a woman named Uta.
16. "Ashes"
  - David's sister marries; their mother, Sharon, is dying of cancer.
17. "Naked"
  - David visits a nudist colony.

"Dinah, the Christmas Whore" was reprinted later in the year in Sedaris's Holidays on Ice, while "The Incomplete Quad" reappeared in 2020 in his compilation The Best of Me.

== Reception ==
Naked was released by Little, Brown and Company on March 17, 1997, and it first appeared on The New York Times Best Seller list for Hardcover nonfiction the week of April 6, in the No. 14 spot. It spent seven weeks on the list, peaking at the No. 6 spot during its third and fourth weeks. The New York Times's review of the book, penned by Craig Seligman, praised it for its sidesplitting humor that also showcased the bleaker side of life. Seligman revealed that all seventeen of the essays cracked him up, while Kirkus Reviews opined that from its first sentence, Naked "pretty well clobbers the reader into dizzy submission."

Seligman asserted that the essays about the author's family were both the funniest and saddest ones in the entire collection, with Sedaris's mother standing out as the best character. Kirkus Reviews agreed, calling her "a full-blown comic heroine," and describing the essay that discussed the months leading up to her death as achieving "a brilliant synthesis of solemnity and humor." Publishers Weekly offered the opinion that Sedaris's ability "to sketch such a memorable, seductive character (and, without sentimentality, to describe her death from cancer) is a high achievement, perhaps his highest to date."

Both The New York Times and Kirkus Reviews were disappointed with the book's namesake essay, however, suspecting that Sedaris had visited the nudist colony merely to find material. Seligman thought that his horror at the nude bodies of the colony's elderly patrons was "ugly to read about," but he conceded that Sedaris's own hesitation to strip down was emblematic of how he, like many funny people, had a hard time revealing himself.

Kirkus Reviews characterized Naked as successfully recapturing Barrel Fever's "autobiography as fun-house mirror," but Seligman saw it as a book that was more complicated than, and in transition from, Barrel Fever. To his eyes, Sedaris was trying to figure out how to go beyond the basic short humor piece, with the back end of Naked revealing the sour pain underneath its jokes—his highlighted example was Sedaris's mother on her deathbed and "how pathetically unable she and her children are to express their affection." Publishers Weekly felt that only two of the book's essays matched Barrel Fever laugh for laugh, with the rest of the collection aiming for, and achieving, a subtler kind of comedy.

In his review, Seligman concluded that Sedaris succeeded at revealing himself, and that even the bleakest and most venomous parts of the book would make the reader helplessly spit out their food in laughter. Publishers Weekly also ultimately recommended Naked, suggesting that "even at his most wistful, Sedaris never loses his native taste for raunch," and Kirkus Reviews summed the collection up as "splendid stuff." In 1998, Naked won the Randy Shilts Award for Gay Non-Fiction from Publishing Triangle, and the book's cover design by Chip Kidd has also been praised: Sarah Begley of Time magazine called it "iconic" in 2015, and Susanna Baird of Spine Magazine classed it as one of "the book world's most famous cover images."

Two of Sedaris's own family members objected to the book: his sister Tiffany wondered why she was not featured more prominently, despite having initially told her brother that she did not want to be in it at all; while his father was upset at how his late wife—Sedaris's mother—was portrayed. Sedaris, for his part, maintained that if she were still alive, she would have loved her portrayal and ended up going on the book tour with her son.
