= When You Are Engulfed in Flames =

2008 book by David Sedaris

- First edition cover
- Author: David Sedaris
- Language: English
- Genre: Essay collection
- Publisher: Little, Brown and Company
- Publication date: June 3, 2008
- Publication place: United States
- Media type: Print (hardcover), audiobook
- Pages: 323 pp (first edition, hardcover)
- ISBN: 0-316-14347-2 (first edition, hardcover)
- OCLC: 183392234
- Dewey Decimal: 814/.54 22
- LC Class: PS3569.E314 W48 2008
- Preceded by: Dress Your Family in Corduroy and Denim
- Followed by: Squirrel Seeks Chipmunk: A Modest Bestiary

When You Are Engulfed in Flames is a collection of essays by American humorist David Sedaris. It was published on June 3, 2008.

Sedaris's sixth book, When You Are Engulfed in Flames assembles essays on various situations such as trying to make coffee when the water is shut off, associations in the French countryside, buying drugs in a mobile home in rural North Carolina, having a lozenge fall from your mouth into the lap of a fellow passenger on a plane, armoring windows with LP covers to protect the house from neurotic songbirds, lancing a boil from another's backside, and venturing to Japan to quit smoking. Little, Brown and Company issued a first-run hardcover release of 100,000 copies. The book was a commercial success, topping The New York Times Best Seller list for eight weeks.

== Television appearances ==
Sedaris was a guest on The Daily Show with Jon Stewart on Comedy Central on June 3, 2008. During the interview, he recommended moving to Hiroshima, Japan, for three months to stop smoking. This smoking cessation method, which cost the author $23,000, is the subject of the last essay of his book. He also described the genesis for the name of his book. It was the name of a chapter in a book he found in a hotel room in Hiroshima. He also appeared on the Late Show with David Letterman on July 18, 2008.

== Cover art ==
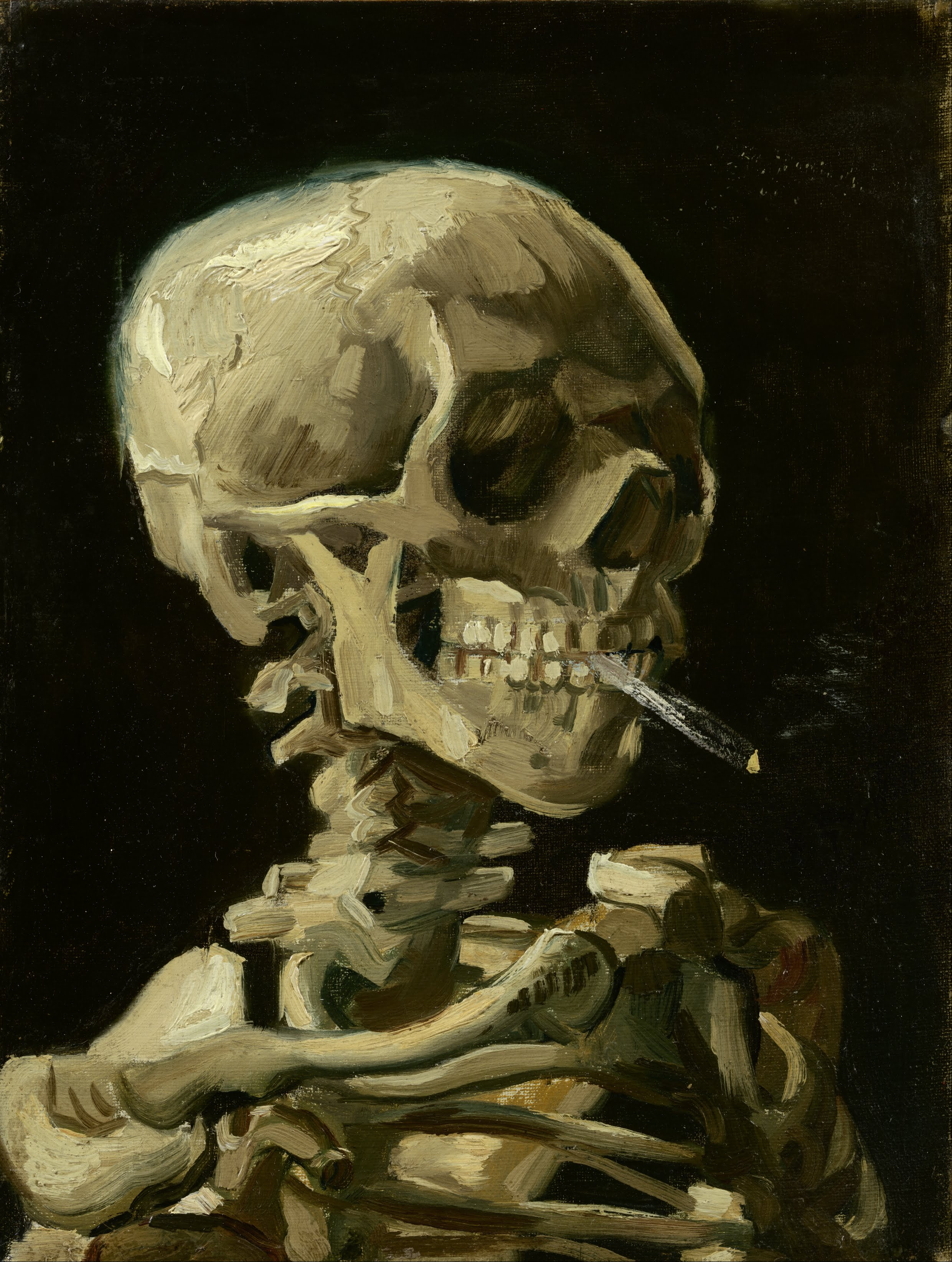
Skull of a Skeleton with Burning Cigarette, oil on canvas, 1885, Van Gogh Museum Amsterdam

The first-edition cover was designed by Chip Kidd. It features Skull of a Skeleton with Burning Cigarette, an early painting by Vincent van Gogh.

== Contents ==
1. It's Catching – A work on Sedaris's partner Hugh and his mother
2. Keeping Up – Sedaris trying to keep up with Hugh, who walks too fast
3. The Understudy – Memories of a bad white trash babysitter.
4. This Old House – Sedaris moves into a boarding house.
5. Buddy, Can You Spare a Tie? – Sedaris's recollections on various bad clothes and "accessories"
6. Road Trips – Being picked up by a driver who wants a blow job.
7. What I Learned – Talking about Princeton
8. That's Amore – A rude neighbor named Helen
9. The Monster Mash – Sedaris's fascination with corpses.
10. In the Waiting Room – Language barriers and the consequences
11. Solution to Saturday's Puzzle – Sedaris's throat lozenge falls onto a bitchy airplane seatmate
12. Adult Figures Charging Toward a Concrete Toadstool – Sedaris's parents collecting art
13. Memento Mori – Buying a skeleton for Hugh
14. All the Beauty You Will Ever Need – Making coffee without water and his relationship with Hugh
15. Town and Country – A cabbie in New York who talks about his sex life
16. Aerial – Using album covers to scare away birds
17. The Man in the Hut – A neighbor in France who was sent to prison for molesting his wife's grandchildren
18. Of Mice and Men – About icebreaker conversations
19. April in Paris – About interacting with animals and Sedaris's recollections of a spider
20. Crybaby – Sedaris sits next to a grieving man on a plane.
21. Old Faithful – Hugh lances a boil on Sedaris's backside
22. The Smoking Section – Sedaris tries to stop smoking in Japan
