= Theft by Finding: Diaries (1977–2002) =

2017 non-fiction book by David Sedaris

- First edition
- Author: David Sedaris
- Language: English
- Genre: Diary
- Publisher: Little, Brown and Company
- Publication date: May 30th, 2017
- Publication place: United States
- Media type: Print (hardcover)
- Pages: 528 pages
- ISBN: 978-0316154727
- Preceded by: Let's Explore Diabetes with Owls

Theft by Finding: Diaries (1977–2002) is an edited compilation of diary entries by David Sedaris published on May 30, 2017. Sedaris shares selected entries spanning from his days as a 20-year-old hitchhiking through Oregon to living in London just shy of his 46th birthday. It was released in advance of David Sedaris Diaries: A Visual Compendium, which was published the same year and edited by Jeffrey Jenkins.
