= List of 1997 This American Life episodes =

In 1997, there were 40 new This American Life episodes.

- Episode 48 – "Justice"

Kitty Felde shows a side of the Yugoslav War Crimes Trials that hasn't been discussed anywhere: a portrait of Americans at the International Tribunal. And other stories. 1997-01-03.

  - Act I. International Justice.
  - Act II. Juvenile Justice.
  - Act III. Everyday Justice; Apology Hot Line.
- Episode 49 – "Animals"

Stories about the animalness of animals, the irreducible ways in which they are not human. 1997-01-10; This is a repeat of episode 12 which originally aired 1996-01-31.

  - Prologue
  - Act I. Staging the Food Chain in a New York Apartment.
  - Act II. Animal Court, written by David Sedaris.
  - Act III. The Moment Humans Stop Being Animals.
- Episode 50 – "Shoulda Been Dead"

Kevin Kelly was in Jerusalem. For reasons too complicated to go into here, he ended up sleeping on the spot where Jesus was supposedly crucified. After Kevin awoke, the thought came into his head: Live as if you'll die in six months. So he did. He got rid of all his possessions. He visited his parents and brothers and sisters for the last time. That, and other stories of starting life over, including a visit to a courtroom in Los Angeles where people go to change their names. 1997-01-17

  - Prologue. Sandra, a gang girl, almost died at the age of fourteen.
  - Act I The Day After Kevin Slept on the Spot Where Jesus was Crucified.
  - Act II The Day Lawrence Left the AIDS Clinic for the Big Road Trip.
  - Act III The Day Claudia Asked Her Brother Some Questions.
  - Act IV The Day Sheryl Got the News.
  - Act V. The Day Matthew saw Bridgette. On the Edge of the World.
- Episode 51 – "Animals Die, People Ponder"

Stories of people who handle dead animals. Don't worry — it's not as gross as it sounds. In fact, not disgusting at all. A story by George Saunders about an animal control man who falls in unrequited love. A woman who studies illuminated manuscripts, whose pages look like paper but are in fact animals. And other stories. 1997-01-24

  - Act I. I'm Fernand, I'm Glad to be Your Stake Tonight.
  - Act II. The 400lb CEO; a story by John Saunders.
  - Act III. Dead Animal Man.
  - Act IV. Redemption.
- Episode 52 – "Edge of Sanity"

Stories about the border between mental health and mental illness. 1997-01-31

  - Prologue; Mental Health and Romance.
  - Act I. Girl Interrupted; based on Susanna Kaysen's story.
  - Act II. Guided by Voices.
  - Act III. Plague of Tics; David Sedaris.
  - Act IV. You Don't Have to be Crazy to Work Here, But it Would Help. What is like to hold the keys to the asylum, but your grip on them is not too steady.
- Episode 53 – "Valentine's Day '97"

For Valentine's Day, stories about our parents falling in love. And troubles with their love. From Hilton Als, Scott Carrier, Julie Showalter, a magazine column called Men My Mother Dated and others. The idea for this show was inspired by Delmore Schwartz's classic 1937 work of American fiction about his parents' courtship: In Dreams Begin Responsibilities and Other Stories. 1997-02-07

  - Prologue: Ira Glass reads from "In Dreams Begin Responsibilities."
  - Act I. Men My Mother Dated. Brett Leveridge reads from: "Men My Mother Dated and Other Mostly True Tales."
  - Act II. Mom, Dad and Bats. Bia Lowe
  - Act III. It's Not the Heat. Song: "I Got a Crush on You" Jenny Magnus.
  - Act IV. Hilton Als reads from his book: "The Women"
  - Act V. Scott Carrier: "Running After Antelope"; questions to a daughter.
- Episode 54 – "Sinatra"

Stories, tributes, and attempts to understand the Chairman of the Board. 1997-02-21

  - Prologue. Ira Glass's observations on performances of the time and about the performer. Writer Rennie Sparks.
  - Act I: "The Death of Frank Sinatra"; Michael Ventura reads.
  - Act II: A modest request to all of American television from one Sinatra fan on her knees: "One Sinatra Fan... Versus All of Network TV"
  - Act III: History lesson for young people: "History Lesson."
  - Act IV: "Frank Sinatra Has a Cold."
  - Act V: A restaurant full of cabbies gets choked-up over Frank: "How Sinatra Affects Us."
- Episode 55 – "Three Women and the Sex Industry"

A few months ago, radio producer Sandy Tolan was supposed to do a documentary about strippers with an aspiring writer — and stripper — named Susan. A few days before they were to begin working together, Susan disappeared, presumed dead. 1997-02-28

  - Prologue: Sarah, A college student in San Francisco ventures in phone sex business and also finds a job she loves dancing naked at the club.
  - Act 1: "Susan". Someone whose life comes apart working in the go-go clubs; Susan Walsh. Sandy Tolan interviews for a documentary.
  - Act II. "Striptease" A guy who prefers pornography than having sex with his girlfriend changes. Therapist Lauren Slater.
- Episode 56 – "Name Change"

Stories of people changing their name — some to create a new identity, some to con people. Name changes are particularly American stories: they're the dream of starting over with a clean slate. They're Ellis Island and 12-step programs, the move westward and self help, Marilyn Monroe and Malcolm X and the Artist Formerly Known as Prince, all rolled up in one. 1997-03-07

- Episode 57 – "Delivery"

Stories about the delivery business and the people in it. UPS men, bike messengers, FedEx dispatchers. Includes a new radio play by David Sedaris, in which we give him one sound effects record and this assignment: His radio play can only use sound effects from this record, and it must use all the sound effects on the disc. 1997-03-14

- Episode 58 – "Small Towns"

Stories of small town life: the claustrophia and freedom people feel in small towns, the yearning people feel in small towns. And three teenagers in one of the harshest urban environments explain how the public housing projects are like a small town. 1997-04-04

- Episode 59 – "Fire"

Stories about people who are not afraid of fire, though perhaps they should be. 1997-04-11

- Episode 60 – "Business of Death"

Usually we talk about death as a tragedy, a mystery, a hard-to-comprehend fact of life. But in addition to all that, for all sorts of people it's also ... a job. Stories of undertakers, homicide detectives, slaughterhouse workers, enunculators, autopsy pathologists, exterminators, and others. Does their contact with death teach them something we should learn? 1997-04-18

- Episode 61 – "Fiasco!"

Stories of when things go wrong. Really wrong. When you leave the normal realm of human error, fumble, mishap, and mistake and enter the territory of really huge breakdowns. Fiascos. Things go so awry that normal social order collapses. This week's show is a philosophical inquiry in the nature of fiascos — perhaps the first ever. 1997-04-25

- Episode 62 – "Something for Nothing"

Stories of people trying to get rich quick or otherwise make something for nothing. As everyone knows, there's no such thing as something for nothing. You always pay a price. 1997-05-02

- Episode 63 – "One Thing"

People whose lives are organized around one thing. 1997-05-09

- Episode 64 – "Summer"

Stories for the start of summer. We want summer to be this wonderful break, but so often it fails to deliver. We hear Ron Carlson's short story about a summer job delivering tanks of oxygen to the infirm, Scott Carrier takes a river vacation, and more. 1997-05-23

- Episode 65 – "Who's Canadian"

Notes and stories about the Canadians among us. Are they in fact any different from red-blooded Americans? They claim they're not. Skeptical Americans put their position to the test. 1997-05-30

- Episode 66 – "Tales from the Net"

Are people having experiences on the Internet they wouldn't have anywhere else? Several weeks ago, This American Life invited listeners to help answer that question. 1997-06-06

- Episode 67 – "Your Dream, My Nightmare"

Could it be more obvious? Stories in which someone's dream is someone else's nightmare. All of us get into these situations with strangers, with the people we love most, with our own parents, with our children. 1997-06-27

- Episode 68 – "Lincoln's Second Inaugural"

A show for July 4th weekend. We begin with perhaps the most moving, poetic inaugural speech in American history, and look at its legacy today. In his second inaugural address, Lincoln wondered aloud why God saw fit to send the slaughter of the Civil War to the United States. His conclusion: that slavery was a kind of original sin for the United States, for both North and South, and all Americans had to do penance for it. 1997-07-04

- Episode 69 – "Dreamhouse"

How many of our parents move to some place — some dream house — with some vision of a new life in the new place, and move the family with them, hoping it works out for the kids. Three stories on this theme. 1997-07-18

- Episode 70 – "Other People's Mail"

When you read other people's mail, you can't help but try to fill in between the lines. You try to decipher the stories of the people who wrote the letters. We hear four stories of people who read other people's mail, and what happens to them once they get caught up in these other lives. 1997-07-25

- Episode 71 – "Defying Sickness"

Stories of people trying to do exactly what the doctors say they can't — or shouldn't. 1997-08-01

- Episode 72 – "Trek"

An idiosyncratic first-person travelogue about race relations and tourism from radio producer Rich Robinson and television producer Josh Seftel. Their radio story is about a trip they took to the new South Africa. Rich Robinson is black. Josh Seftel is white. The interracial pair travel through the still mostly-segregated society and have very different opinions about what they see, especially when it comes to some distant relatives of Josh's in South Africa. 1997-08-08

- Episode 73 – "Blame it on Art"

The darker side of the art world: petty jealousies, competitiveness, failure. And also what's so great about art. 1997-08-15

- Episode 74 – "Conventions"

What happens when people with one common interest gather in monstrous, fluorescent -lit halls for the weekend? Sometimes they drive each other crazy, sometimes they fall in love. 1997-08-30

- Episode 75 – "Kindness of Strangers"

Stories of the kindness of strangers and where it leads. Also, the unkindness of strangers and where that can lead. All of today's stories take place in the city most people think of as the least kind city in America: New York. 1997-09-12

- Episode 76 – "Mob"

The mob as portrayed in movies, and as it is in real life. And its hold over us. 1997-09-19

- Episode 77 – "Pray"

Can the secular world and the religious world understand each other? We ask that question while visiting Colorado Springs, Colorado, where Pastor Ted Haggard at the New Life Church has put in place a project to pray in front of the home of every person in the city, systematically, block by block and house by house. He's also helped organize a 24-hour, 365-day-a-year "prayer shield" over the city; all-night prayer vigils; and more. 1997-09-26

- Episode 78 – "How Bad is Bad?"

How bad is bad enough to count? To go to hell? 1997-10-03

- Episode 79 – "Stuck in the Wrong Decade"

People stuck in the wrong decade — or simply carrying a lot of the props from another decade. 1997-10-10

- Episode 80 – "Running After Antelope"

Stories of people engaged in a battle with nature — a battle they don't stand much chance of winning. Most of the show is Scott Carrier's story of trying for twelve years to chase down and catch an antelope by foot. 1997-10-17

- Episode 81 – "Guns"

Americans who love their guns...and the Americans who love them. 1997-10-24

- Episode 82 – "Haunted by Ghosts"

Stories of people who are haunted, not by ghosts or phantoms, but by other people. 1997-10-31

- Episode 83 – "One of Us"

Stories of outsiders who want to be insiders, and vice versa. 1997-11-14

- Episode 84 – "Harold"

A parable of politics and race in America. The story of Chicago's first black mayor, Harold Washington, told two decades after his death. Washington died on November 25, 1987. 1997-11-21

- Episode 85 – "Poultry Slam '97"

Humans have turned chicken and turkey into what we want them to be. Which means that chickens and turkeys are a mirror of ourselves. 1997-12-05

- Episode 86 – "How To Take Money From Strangers"

Three stories of how to get money from strangers. In every story, the money is made by people who make the strangers feel good about themselves and about their nation. 1997-12-12

- Episode 87 – "A Very Special Sedaris Christmas"

Stories from David Sedaris's book of Christmas stories, Holidays on Ice, read onstage by David, Julia Sweeney and actor Matt Malloy. 1997-12-19
