= Sedaris =

Sedaris is a surname. Notable people with the surname include:

- Amy Sedaris (born 1961), American actress, author, and comedian
- David Sedaris (born 1956), American humorist, comedian, author, and radio contributor

== See also ==
- Jason Sudeikis
- Neil Sedaka
