= Happy-Go-Lucky (book) =

2022 essay collection by David Sedaris

- First edition cover
- Author: David Sedaris
- Audio read by: David Sedaris
- Language: English
- Publisher: Little, Brown and Company
- Publication date: May 31, 2022
- Publication place: United States
- Media type: Print, e-book, audiobook
- Pages: 272
- ISBN: 978-0-316-39245-7
- Preceded by: Calypso

Happy-Go-Lucky is a collection of 18 semi-autobiographical essays by David Sedaris. It was published on May 31, 2022, by Little, Brown and Company. Out of these 18 essays, 13 were previously published in a magazine or through Amazon Original Stories; some of these were published under a different title or in a different form.

== Essays ==
1. "Active Shooter" (Note: First published in The New Yorker)
2. "Father Time"
3. "Bruised"
4. "A Speech to the Graduates" (Note: First published in The Paris Review)
5. "Hurricane Season"
6. "Highfalutin" (Note: First published in Elle)
7. "Unbuttoned"
8. "Themes and Variations" (Note: First published by Amazon Original Stories)
9. "To Serbia with Love"
10. "The Vacuum"
11. "Pearls"
12. "Fresh-Caught Haddock"
13. "Happy-Go-Lucky"
14. "A Better Place"
15. "Lady Marmalade"
16. "Smile, Beautiful" (Note: First published in British Vogue)
17. "Pussytoes"
18. "Lucky-Go-Happy"

== Synopsis ==
In Happy-Go-Lucky, Sedaris continues where he left off in Calypso, writing about his transition into late midlife during the final years of the first Trump administration and into the COVID-19 pandemic. He writes about his life and the lives of his family—including his siblings, his longtime partner Hugh, and the decline of his 98-year-old father, with whom he had a fractured relationship.

== Reception ==
Happy-Go-Lucky debuted at number one on The New York Times nonfiction best-seller list for the week ending June 4, 2022.

Publishers Weekly wrote, "Sedaris's tragicomedy is gloomier than usual, but it's as rich and rewarding as ever." In a rave review, Anita Snow of the Associated Press wrote, "Writing about his teen years, Sedaris is simultaneously amusing and brutal while unflinchingly exposing the ironies of his family and life in general." In a mixed review, Houman Barekat of The Guardian criticized Sedaris as coming across as "glib on racial politics", "cranky" toward the younger generation, and "petty" and "bitter", but admitted "it is partly because of these flaws that people relate to him." Barekat concluded, "On the page he's a somewhat diminished presence: engaging but rarely captivating."
