= Meet David Sedaris =

BBC Radio 4 comedy series featuring David Sedaris

- Meet David Sedaris BBC Radio 4 artwork
- Genre: Comedy
- Running time: 28 minutes
- Country of origin: United Kingdom
- Language: English
- Home station: BBC Radio 4
- Starring: David Sedaris
- Written by: David Sedaris
- Produced by: Steve Doherty for Giddy Goat Productions
- Recording studio: Recorded in theatres across London, except Series 8, which was recorded at Sedaris's home in Rackham, West Sussex due to the COVID-19 pandemic
- Original release: 2 April 2010
- No. of series: 10
- No. of episodes: 59
- Audio format: Stereophonic sound

Meet David Sedaris is a BBC Radio 4 radio programme featuring American humorist David Sedaris reading new and previously collected stories live before an audience. There have been 10 series, plus a Christmas special, with the first series broadcast in April 2010.

Each episode runs for 28 minutes, with some episodes including questions from the audience or diary extracts to fill time. Series 8 was recorded at Sedaris's home in Rackham, West Sussex due to the COVID-19 pandemic. Repeats have also aired on BBC Radio 4 Extra.

Episodes cover a variety of Sedaris’s well-known essays, stories and previously unreleased material (typically diary extracts).

== Episodes ==
=== Series 1 (2010) ===
Episode	Title(s)	Original air date
1	Six-to-Eight Black Men / Just a Quick Email	2 April 2010
2	Let It Snow / The Cat and the Baboon / Keeping Up	9 April 2010
3	Picapocketoni / I'll Eat What He's Wearing	16 April 2010
4	Kookabura / With a Pal Like This...	23 April 2010

=== Series 2 (2011) ===
Episode	Title(s)	Original air date
1	The Incomplete Quad / The Squirrel and the Chipmunk	13 June 2011
2	Me Talk Pretty One Day / It's Catching	20 June 2011
3	Nuit of the Living Dead / The End of the Affair	27 June 2011
4	Us and Them / Selected Diary Extracts	4 July 2011
5	Memento Mori / The Motherless Bear	11 July 2011
6	The Ship Shape / Make That a Double	18 July 2011

=== Series 3 (2012) ===
Episode	Title(s)	Original air date
1	Attaboy / In the Waiting Room	17 September 2012
2	Author, Author / Front Row Center with Thaddeus Bristol	24 September 2012
3	Memory Lapse / If I Ruled the World	1 October 2012
4	Put a Lid on It	8 October 2012
5	Easy Tiger / Possession	15 October 2012
6	Rubbish / Jesus Shaves	22 October 2012

=== Series 4 (2013) ===
Episode	Title(s)	Original air date
1	The Happy Place / The Shadow of Your Smile	29 July 2013
2	Repeat After Me	5 August 2013
3	Number 2 to Go / Innocents Abroad	12 August 2013
4	Company Man / Diary Extracts	19 August 2013
5	English Lesson / Understanding Understanding Owls	26 August 2013
6	The Sea Section / Dog Days	2 September 2013

=== Christmas Special (2014) ===
Title	Original air date	Notes
The Santaland Diaries	25 December 2014	A standalone festive episode featuring Sedaris reading his classic holiday story before a live audience.

=== Series 5 (2015) ===
Episode	Title(s)	Original air date
1	The Understudy / Big Boy	25 May 2015
2	Stepping Out / The Vigilant Rabbit	1 June 2015
3	Leviathan	8 June 2015
4	Little Guy / Now Hiring Friendly People / The Ones That Got Away	15 June 2015
5	Calypso / Follow Me	22 June 2015
6	Loggerheads	29 June 2015

=== Series 6 (2017) ===
Episode	Title(s)	Original air date
1	Untamed / Theft By Finding Diary Extracts	19 July 2017
2	Of Mice and Men / A Can of Worms	26 July 2017
3	Suitable for Framing / Diary Extracts	2 August 2017
4	Buddy, Can You Spare a Tie? / A Modest Proposal	9 August 2017
5	A Number of Reasons I've Been Depressed Lately / Diary Extracts	16 August 2017
6	The Perfect Fit / Audience Q&A	23 August 2017

=== Series 7 (2019) ===
Episode	Title(s)	Original air date
1	Father Time / Diary Extracts	6 November 2019
2	The Godfather / Diary Extracts / Audience Q&A	13 November 2019
3	The Silent Treatment / Diary Extracts	20 November 2019
4	Why Aren’t You Laughing?	27 November 2019
5	Active Shooter / Diary Extracts	4 December 2019
6	CNN / Boo Hooey / Million Dollar Ideas	11 December 2019

=== Series 8 (2021) ===
Each episode in Series 8 was recorded remotely during the COVID-19 pandemic. While all stories were recorded in the nook above Sedaris's home office, each episode was introduced from a different location in his house. As Sedaris explained: "Usually we make these shows for the BBC accompanied by 300 or so people at a theatre in London. Things have been unusual this year, though. So we're reduced to working from my home. We recorded all the actual stories in the little nook above my office, but Steve thought it would be nice to introduce each episode from a different room in my house. To make you feel at home in my home (or, one of my homes)."

Episode	Title	Contents	Notes
1	Instalment 1	Recipe for Disaster, Nailed, Must Everything Go? (plus diary extracts)	Introduced from the living room
2	Instalment 2	Unbuttoned	Introduced from the garden
3	Instalment 3	Highfalutin'	Introduced from the roadside
4	Instalment 4	Hurricane Season	Introduced from the garden shed
5	Instalment 5	Don't Think About Sex Robots, Haven't We Met?, On Hoarding, Goldenheart	Introduced from the kitchen
6	Instalment 6	Travels With Patsy	Introduced from the office

=== Series 9 (2023) ===
Series 9 was recorded live at The Tabernacle in Notting Hill, London. The programme featured Sedaris reading essays and selections from his diary before an audience, continuing the format used since the show’s inception.

Episode	Title(s)	Original air date
1	Happy Go Lucky	19 June 2023
2	Fresh Caught Haddock	26 June 2023
3	Pussytoes	3 July 2023
4	Eat the Rich!	10 July 2023
5	My Corona / A Better Place	17 July 2023
6	Sweet Land of Liberty	24 July 2023

=== Series 10 (2025) ===
Series 10 was recorded at The Shaw Theatre in London. It marked a return to larger in-person venues, with Sedaris performing new stories and extracts to a live audience.

Episode	Title(s)	Original air date
1	The Hem of His Garment	1 April 2025
2	Love on the Spectrum	8 April 2025
3	Goodyear (plus diary extracts)	15 April 2025
4	Trophy Room (plus diary extracts)	22 April 2025
5	Small Talk / Good Grief	29 April 2025
6	Friends / Leprechaun	6 May 2025

== Multimedia ==
Series one to nine were released by Audible as audiobooks:

Series One (2013)

Series Two (2013)

Series Three (2013)

Series Four (2014)

Series Five (2016)

Series Six (2018)

Series Seven (2019)

Series Eight (2022)

Series Nine (2023)
