= The Land and Its People =

2026 book of essays by David Sedaris

- First edition cover
- Author: David Sedaris
- Audio read by: David Sedaris
- Language: English
- Publisher: Little, Brown and Company
- Publication date: May 26, 2026
- Publication place: New York
- Media type: Print (hardcover), ebook, audio
- Pages: 272
- ISBN: 9780316264839 (First edition hardcover)
- OCLC: 1574868439

The Land and Its People: Essays is a book consisting of a collection of 28 essays depicting humankind, aging, travel adventures, and family dynamics by David Sedaris. The book was published by Little, Brown and Company on May 26, 2026.

== Reception ==
According to The New York Times, "In David Sedaris’s wry new collection, being alive is as weird, atrocious, contradictory, unfair and funny as ever... What I admire most about Sedaris is that he examines aging with the same vigor, curiosity and grim glee that he showed in his earlier books, when he wrote about his younger self."

The Guardian (UK) says that "Sedaris plays up the curmudgeonliness in a collection that nevertheless entertains... As with so many pro curmudgeons, the impression one gets of Sedaris after reading him is of someone who feels things deeply and is probably, at root, a soppy guy."

The Booklist reviewer, Carol Haggas, says, "With his laconic delivery, Sedaris lures the reader into believing that the topic under discussion might be unremarkable, a you-and-me-in-this-together moment. But then, given Sedaris’ worldview and world weariness, eventually a knotty twist or spicy dash is delivered with the realization that Sedaris’ land is unparalleled, and its people are peerless."

Publishers Weekly says, "Throughout, Sedaris’s wit and keen awareness of life’s absurdities are on full display. These essays are among the best of his career. Rutgers University says, "The essays in this collection are quirky, snarky, funny, and touching with a hint of melancholy. There are many relatable, laugh-out-loud moments that may seem outlandish, but are worth reading multiple times."
