= Me Talk Pretty One Day =

2000 essay collection by David Sedaris

- First edition
- Author: David Sedaris
- Cover artist: Jacket design by Chip Kidd
- Language: English
- Genre: Essay collection
- Publisher: Little, Brown and Company
- Publication date: May 2, 2000
- Publication place: United States
- Media type: Print (hardcover and paperback)
- Pages: 288 pp (first edition, hardcover)
- ISBN: 0-316-77772-2 (first edition, hardcover)
- OCLC: 43562054
- Dewey Decimal: 814/.54 21
- LC Class: PS3569.E314 M4 2000
- Preceded by: Holidays on Ice
- Followed by: Dress Your Family in Corduroy and Denim

Me Talk Pretty One Day, published in 2000, is a collection of essays by American humorist David Sedaris. The book is separated into two parts. The first part consists of essays about Sedaris’s life before his move to Normandy, France, including his upbringing in suburban Raleigh, North Carolina, his time working odd jobs in New York City, and a visit to New York from a childhood friend and her bumpkinish girlfriend. The second section, "Deux", tells of Sedaris’s move to Normandy with his partner Hugh, often drawing humor from his efforts to live in France without speaking French and his frustrated attempts to learn it. Prior to publication, several of the essays were read by the author on the Public Radio International program, This American Life.

In April 2001, Variety reported that Sedaris had sold the Me Talk Pretty One Day film rights to director Wayne Wang, who was adapting four stories from the book for Columbia Pictures with hopes of beginning shooting in late 2001. At the time, Sedaris commented, "It's just one of those things I had never considered. Like, 'What if I de-clawed a kitten?' But I like Wayne Wang a lot." He recommended Jack Lemmon to play his father and Elaine Stritch for his mother. Wang had completed the script and begun casting when Sedaris asked to "get out of it," after a conversation with his sister aroused concerns as to how his family might be portrayed on screen. He wrote about the conversation and its aftermath in the essay "Repeat After Me", published in Dress Your Family in Corduroy and Denim. Sedaris recounted that Wang was "a real prince. I didn't want him to be mad at me, but he was so grown up about it. I never saw how it could be turned into a movie anyway."

== Plot ==
=== One ===
1. "Go Carolina" - David is forced to go to his elementary school speech therapist for his lisp.
2. "Giant Dreams, Midget Abilities" -. David's father, Lou, enrolls David in guitar lessons taught by a person with dwarfism.
3. "Genetic Engineering" - David discusses the disparate interests between Lou and the rest of the family.
4. "Twelve Moments in the Life of the Artist" - David presents his own efforts to establish himself as a performance artist while fueled by methamphetamine.
5. "You Can't Kill the Rooster" - Despite his horrible language, David's brother, Paul, has a kind heart.
6. "The Youth in Asia" - David recounts his childhood pets and their demises.
7. "The Learning Curve" - David gets a job as a writing teacher and satirizes his efforts at conducting workshops.
8. "Big Boy" - While attending a party, David finds himself trying to get rid of a huge turd left in the toilet by the previous visitor.
9. "The Great Leap Forward" - A woman who lives in a big house hires David as her personal assistant; subsequently he works for a moving company.
10. "Today's Special" - David pokes fun at over-elaborately prepared foods and their fanciful descriptions on menus.
11. "City of Angels" - A lesbian childhood friend from North Carolina comes to visit David in New York and brings along her rather country bumpkin girlfriend she recently met who seems to express culture shock much to the annoyance of David and even her girlfriend.
12. "A Shiner Like a Diamond" - David's sister, Amy, is to be profiled in a New York magazine, an event that occasions David to recall that Lou is obsessed with the Sedaris sisters looking thin and beautiful; they play a practical joke on him.
13. "Nutcracker.com" - David recalls his reluctance to join the internet.

=== Deux ===
1. "See You Again Yesterday" - David recalls his first visits to Normandy with his partner, Hugh.
2. "Me Talk Pretty One Day" - David recalls a French class he took in Paris.
3. "Jesus Shaves" - David recounts a day in the Parisian French class where the class explained Easter to a Moroccan woman.
4. "The Tapeworm Is In" - David buys a Walkman to aid learning French.
5. "Make That a Double" - David explains that he finds gender assignment the most challenging aspect of learning French.
6. "Remembering My Childhood on the Continent of Africa" - David compares the childhood of his partner, Hugh, to his own; where his boyhood had been pedestrian, Hugh's was exotic.
7. "21 Down" - David talks about his crossword addiction.
8. "The City of Light in the Dark" - David enjoys going to the movies in Paris more than seeing the usual cultural sights.
9. "I Pledge Allegiance to the Bag" - David satirizes French ideas of what Americans are like.
10. "Picka Pocketoni" - American tourists mistake David for a pickpocket while riding the train in Paris.
11. "I Almost Saw This Girl Get Killed" - David recalls an evening at the county fair near his home in France.
12. "Smart Guy" - David and Hugh take IQ tests. Hugh outscores David.
13. "The Late Show" - David lists the different fantasies he mulls over while trying to sleep at night.
14. "I'll Eat What He's Wearing" - A visit from David's father Lou prompts David to remember Lou's penchant for economizing, buying and storing food past reasonable limits.
