= Skull of a Skeleton with Burning Cigarette =

Painting by Vincent van Gogh

Skull of a Skeleton with a Burning Cigarette
- Kop van een skelet met brandende sigaret (Dutch)
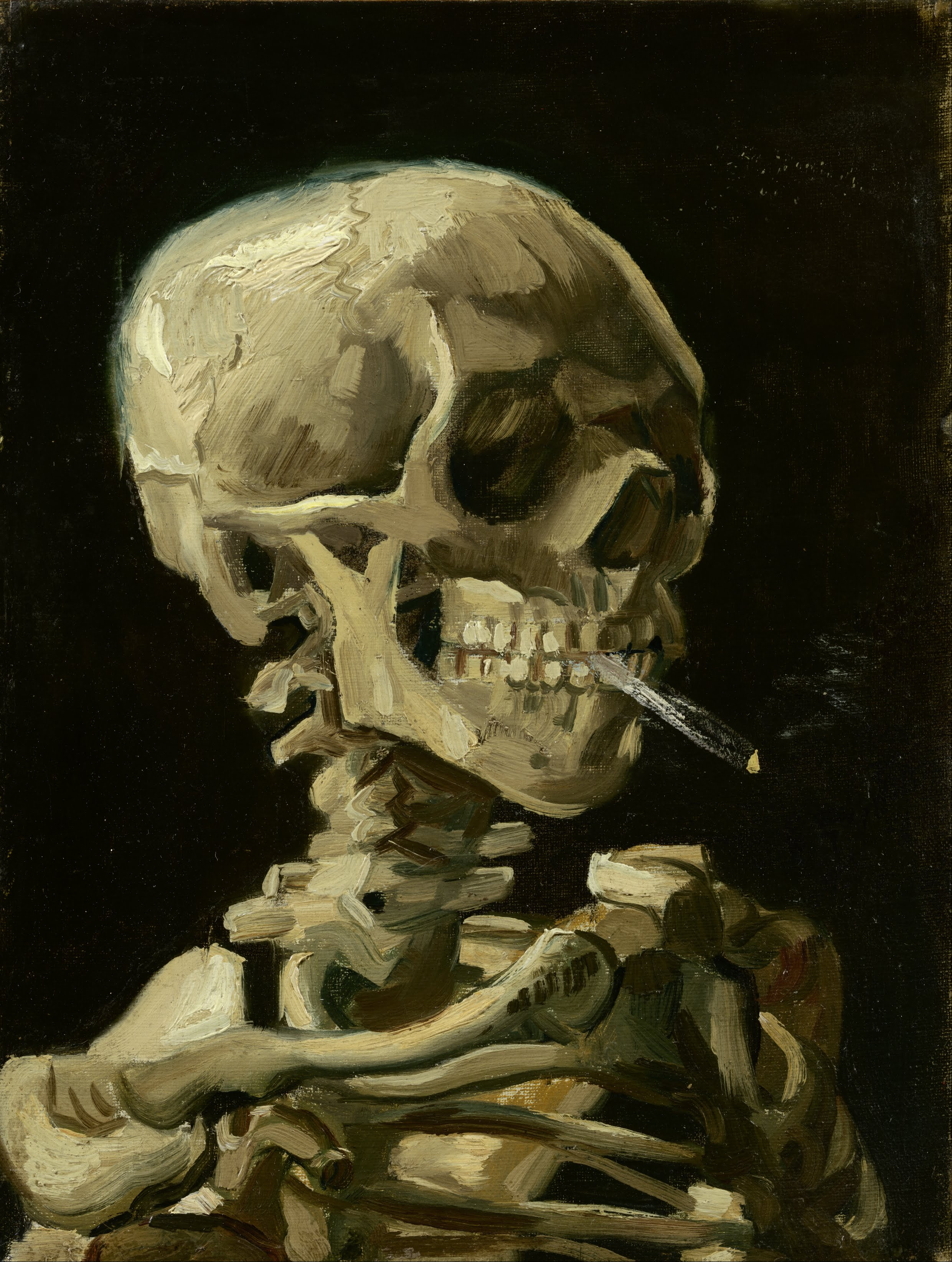
- Artist: Vincent van Gogh
- Year: c. 1885–86
- Catalogue: F212; JH999
- Medium: Oil on canvas
- Dimensions: 32 cm × 24.5 cm (13 in × 9.6 in)
- Location: Van Gogh Museum, Amsterdam; 52.35854°N 4.881319°E

Skull of a Skeleton with Burning Cigarette (Dutch: Kop van een skelet met brandende sigaret) is an early work by Vincent van Gogh. The relatively small and undated oil-on-canvas painting featuring a skeleton and cigarette is part of the permanent collection of the Van Gogh Museum in Amsterdam. It was most likely painted in the winter of 1885–86 as a satirical comment on conservative academic practices. Before it was common to use live humans as models, the academic routine included the study of skeletons to develop an understanding of human anatomy. Van Gogh was in Antwerp, Belgium at that time attending classes at the Royal Academy of Fine Arts, which he later said were boring and taught him nothing.

== Description ==
The work measures 32 by 24.5 centimetres (12.6 in × 9.6 in). It is considered a vanitas or memento mori, at a time when van Gogh himself was in poor health. It may be influenced by works of Hercules Seghers, a 17th-century Dutch artist, or of Félicien Rops, a Belgian contemporary of van Gogh. Although often interpreted as a criticism of smoking, Van Gogh was a keen smoker himself, and continued to smoke until his death in 1890.

The painting was held by Van Gogh's brother Theo van Gogh at the time of his death in 1891. It was inherited by Theo's widow Johanna van Gogh-Bonger until her death in 1925, and then by their son Vincent Willem van Gogh until 1962, when it was acquired by the Van Gogh Foundation. It was on loan to the Stedelijk Museum from 1962 to 1973, and has been on permanent loan to the Van Gogh Museum in Amsterdam since 1973.

== Related works ==
Van Gogh included skeletons in another work from his Antwerp period, a sketch of a Hanging Skeleton and Cat. In 1887–88, van Gogh painted two more paintings with skulls, the only other works of his (besides a drawing from the same period) to use skulls as a motif.

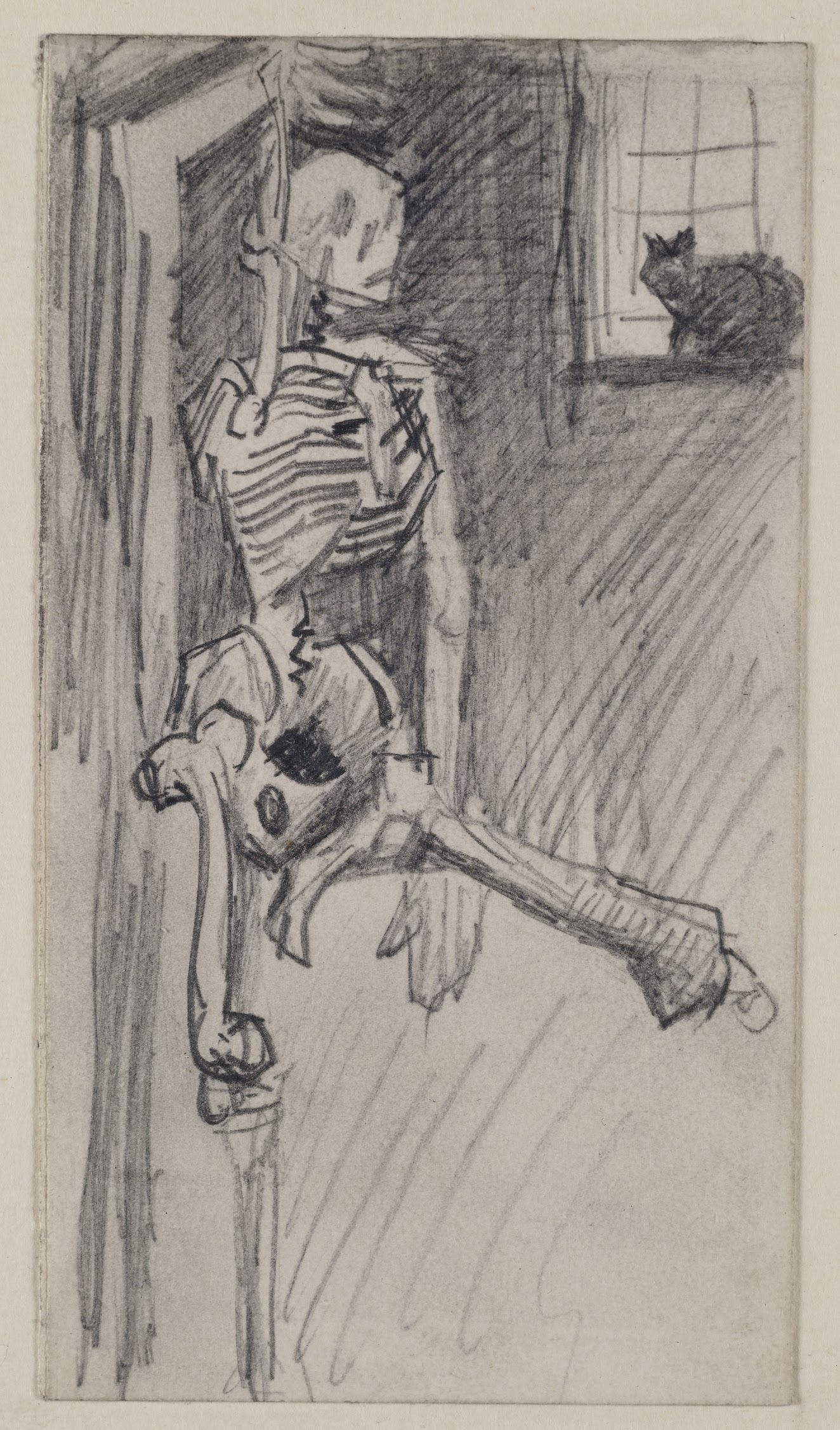
Hanging Skeleton and Cat (1886)

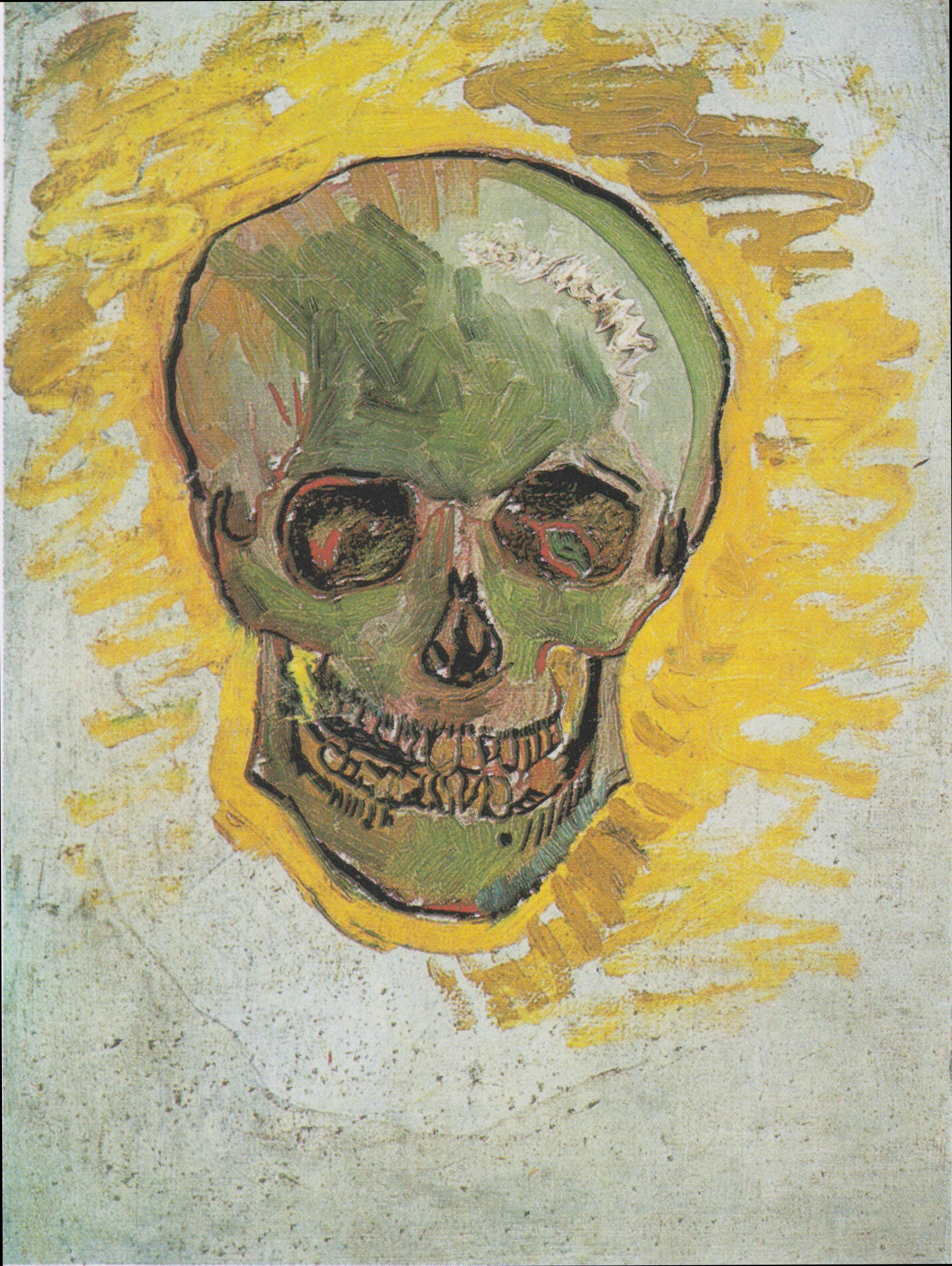
Skull (1887/1888); F297a, JH1347

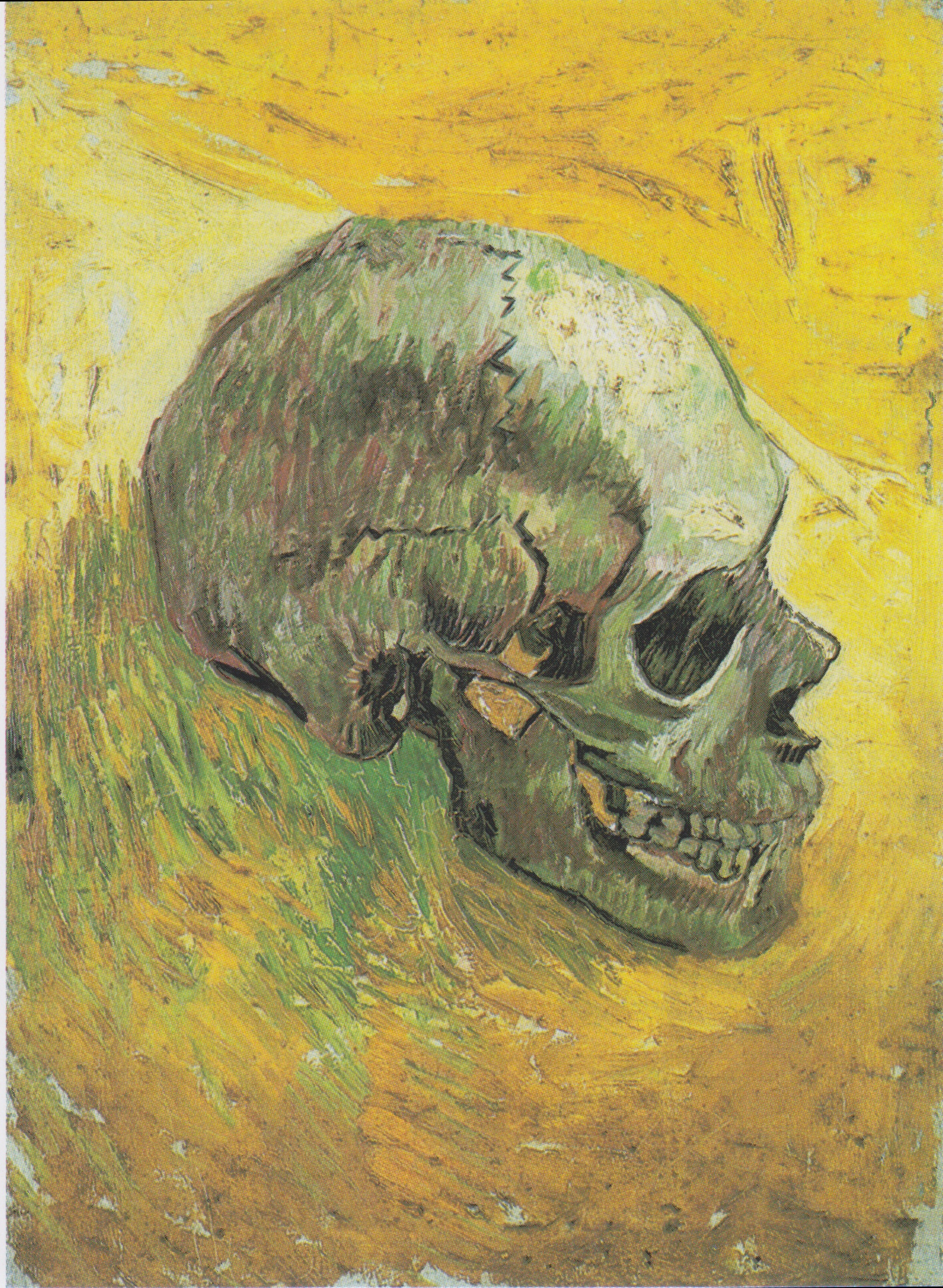
Skull (1887/1888); F297, JH1346

== See also ==
- List of works by Vincent van Gogh
