= Holidays on Ice =

1997 book by David Sedaris

- Author: David Sedaris
- Language: English
- Genre: Essay and short story collection
- Publisher: Little, Brown and Company
- Publication date: December 1997
- Publication place: United States
- Media type: Print (Hardcover and Paperback)
- Pages: 128 pp (first edition, hardcover)
- ISBN: 0-316-77998-9 (first edition, hardcover)
- OCLC: 37187549
- Dewey Decimal: 813/.54 21
- LC Class: PS3569.E314 H65 1997
- Preceded by: Naked
- Followed by: Me Talk Pretty One Day

Holidays on Ice is a 1997 collection of essays and stories about Christmas, some new and some previously published, by David Sedaris.

Sedaris was named by The Economist as one of the funniest writers alive. This is one of his first works, which was subsequently re-released with additional new passages.

The most popular essay is "Santaland Diaries", which is Sedaris' take on working as an elf at a department store grotto during Christmas season.

"Holidays on Ice" was re-released in October 2008 by publisher, Little, Brown & Company. The book has 176 pages.

== Contents ==
=== SantaLand Diaries ===
"SantaLand Diaries" recounts Sedaris' experiences working as an elf at Macy's department store. The essay was originally broadcast on NPR, and is also included in Sedaris' first book Barrel Fever.

=== Season's Greetings to Our Friends and Family!!! ===
A Christmas letter from the Dunbar clan detailing matriarch Mrs. Dunbar's slow descent into insanity during the holiday season—belied by her insistently cheerful tone—as she is forced to cope with the discovery of her husband's infidelity, the resultant prostitute stepdaughter left in their care, and her drug-addict daughter's premature pregnancy. Also first published in Barrel Fever.

=== Dinah, the Christmas Whore ===
Sedaris recalls the Christmas that he was taken on a late-night ride downtown by his sister, Lisa, to rescue a prostitute from her abusive boyfriend. This story was also published in Sedaris' 1997 book Naked.

=== Front Row Center with Thaddeus Bristol ===
A review of the local grade school's Christmas pageant.

=== Based on a True Story ===
Where a member of the media begs a church congregation for information on a heartbreaking story.

=== Christmas Means Giving ===
Where battling neighbors try to outdo each other with holiday generosity.

== See also ==
- List of Christmas-themed literature
