= Ionian Village =

Coordinates: 37.8314°N 21.1537°E

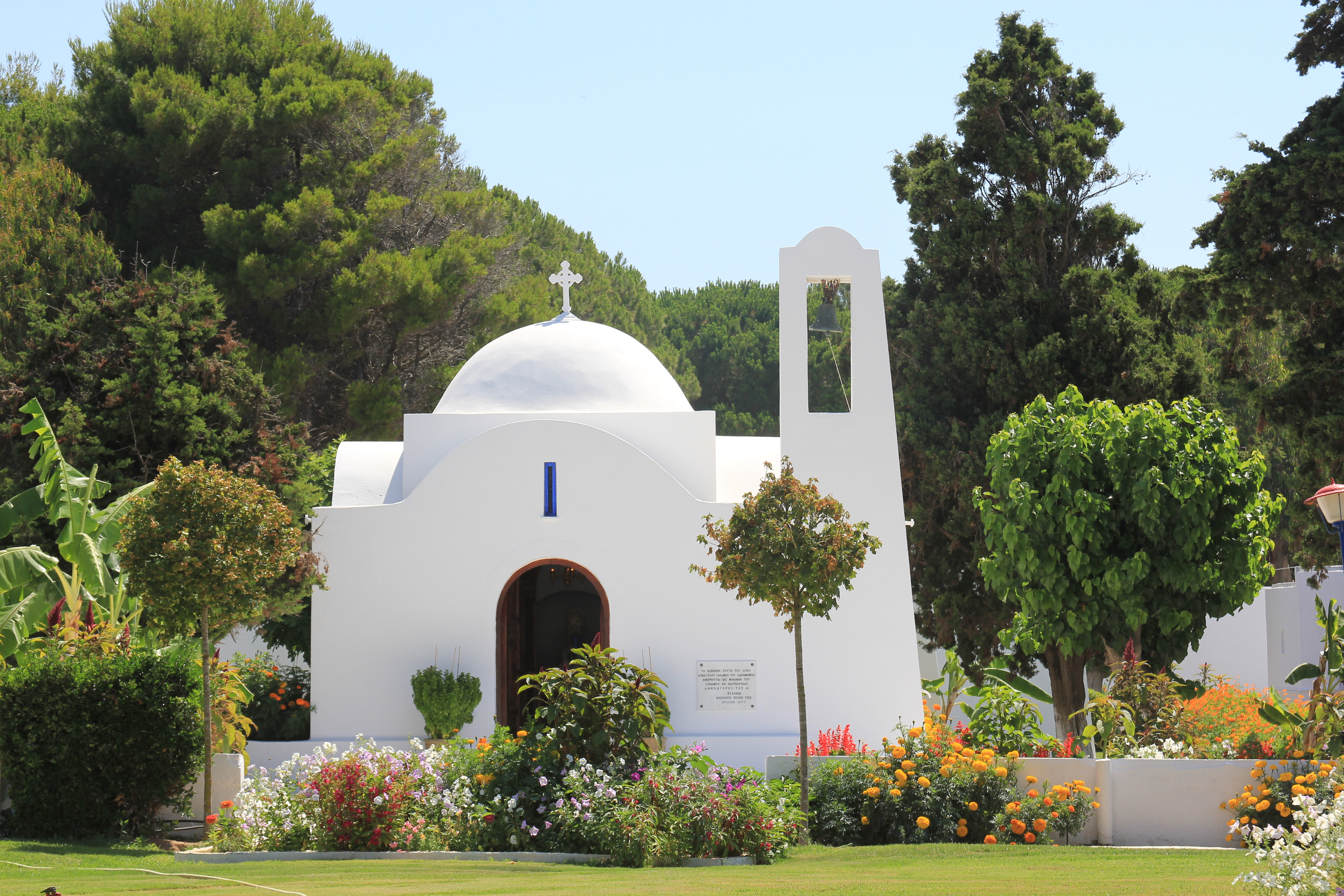
Ionian Village chapel

Ionian Village is the official international summer camping ministry of the Greek Orthodox Archdiocese of America, and is located on a private facility on the shores of the Ionian Sea in western Peloponnese. Over 20,000 Greek-Americans have visited the camp since its establishment in 1970.

Ionian Village primarily operates a summer travel camp program for Greek-American high school youth. Each summer there are two 20-day sessions, identical in schedule. 200 campers per session fly together from New York to Athens and travel by motor coach to the camp, located near Vartholomio, west of the regional trading town of Amaliada. Summer staff for the camp are selected competitively from qualified Orthodox Christian young adults, in addition to medical staff and summer clergy, principally from United States.

The daily camp program of Ionian Village consists of two aspects: in camp days and travel days. In camp days feature a blend of athletics, arts and crafts, music and Greek culture, and time for free swim in the Olympic sized pool or the private beach. Travel days include day trips to historical sites in Greece such as ancient Olympia, Kalavryta, Patras, Vartholomio, and the islands of Zakynthos, Kerkyra, Aegina, & Kefalonia. At the end of the program, participants spend 3 nights in Athens, where they get to visit the Acropolis and Changing of the Guards in Syntagma Square, and shop in Monastiraki.

In addition to these two sessions, Ionian Village also offers an early summer program called IV Next for young adults from the ages of 18 to 25. The program lasts 12 days and includes many of the same experiences as the traditional Ionian Village camp. In the late summer after the end of the second Ionian Village session, Ionian Village also offers a 12 day program called IV Pilgrimage that offers the Ionian Village experience to private groups of 10-20 adults.

== Founding and history ==
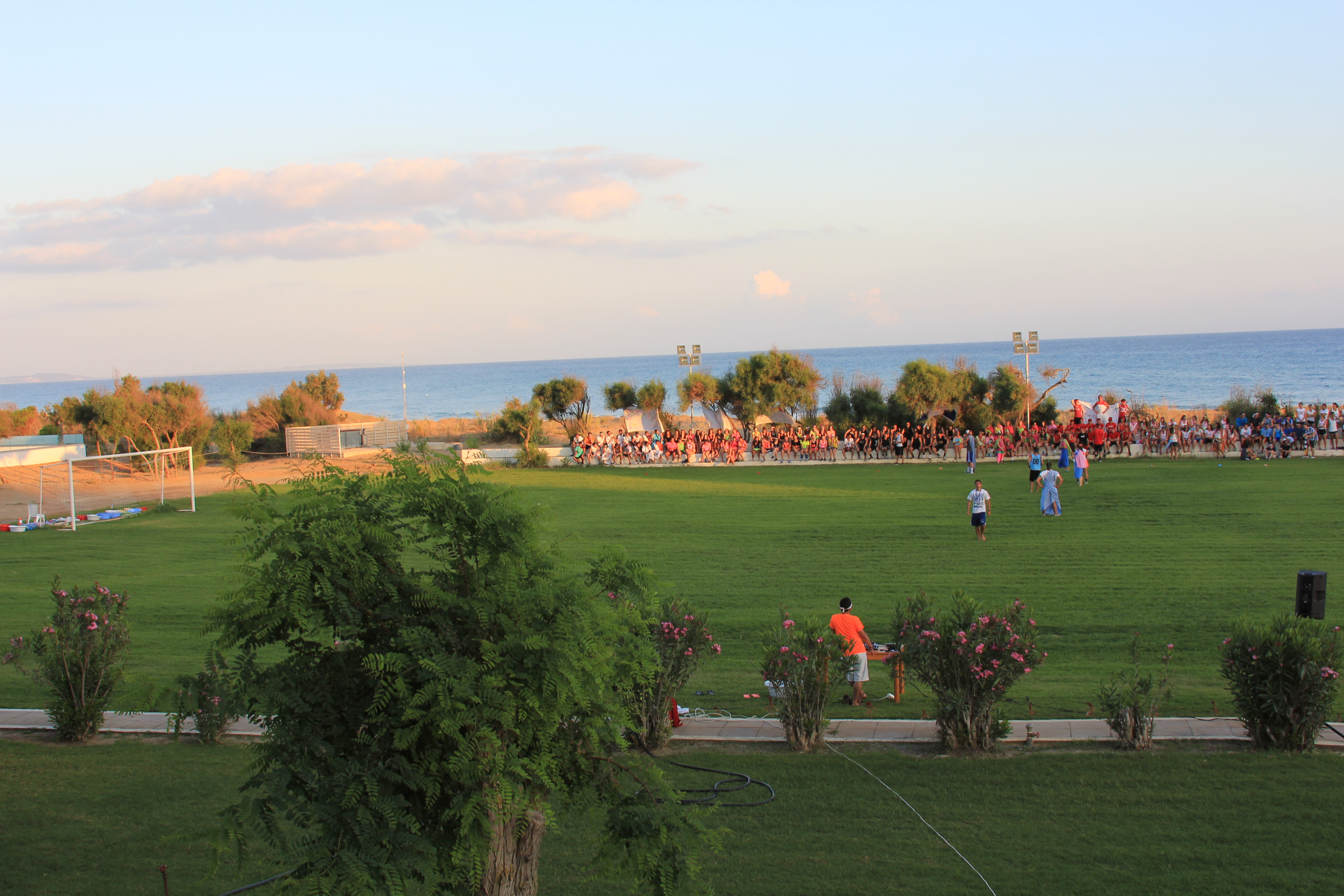
Ionian Village, soccer field

The camp was established in 1970 at the initiative of Archbishop Iakovos of America (of the then-Greek Orthodox Archdiocese of North and South America) as a means of fostering cultural and religious ties to Greece for the children of early-and-mid-20th century Greek immigrants in United States and Canada.

The original land grant of 2,840 acres—11,500 stremmata, or 11.5 square kilometers—of pine forest and beachfront on the north-west coast of Elis, on the Peloponnese mainland was secured by the then-Greek Orthodox Archdiocese of North & South America in 1966 as a gift from the government of Greece, with supportive sponsorship from Greek shipping magnate Aristotle Onassis.

In July 1975, Jacqueline Kennedy Onassis visited the Ionian Village to officiate at the opening of a new recreational building (named the Ethousa) dedicated in memory of Aristotle Onassis. This building would be used for the lodging of clergy and medical staff, "Flextivities", as well as Music & Greek culture activities See this photo of the commemorative plaque unveiled by Mrs. Kennedy-Onassis at the opening.

On the morning of September 8, 2016, a tornado struck Vartholomio as well as neighboring villages. The tornado made first landfall at the Ionian Village campus. The tornado caused extensive damage to the infrastructure, knocking down or uprooting over 600 pine trees, shattering the glass of the pool, destroying the petting zoo, wounding and killing some of the animals in the zoo, wrecking the Trap, destroying the botany that surrounded the walkways, damaging athletic equipment, as well as minor but significant damage to the exteriors of the cabins and the Ethousa. However, the Saint Iakovos Chapel miraculously suffered little to no damage. The damage was estimated to cost around $1.5 million in repair and rejuvenation costs. As of December 25, 2016, the Ionian Village Rebuilding Fund has raised close to $600,000.

=== Directors ===
Father Steven Klund, 2025-Current

Marina Floratos, 2023 - 2024

Father Gary Kyriacou, 2019 - 2022

Father Evagoras Constantinides, 2011-2018

Father Jason Roll, 2009-2011

Father Constantine Lazarakis, 2001-2008

Michael Pappas, 1996-2001

Father Constantine Sitaras, 1972-1996

Father Nick Soteropoulos, 1971-1972

+ Father George Poulos, 1966 - 1971

== The Campground ==
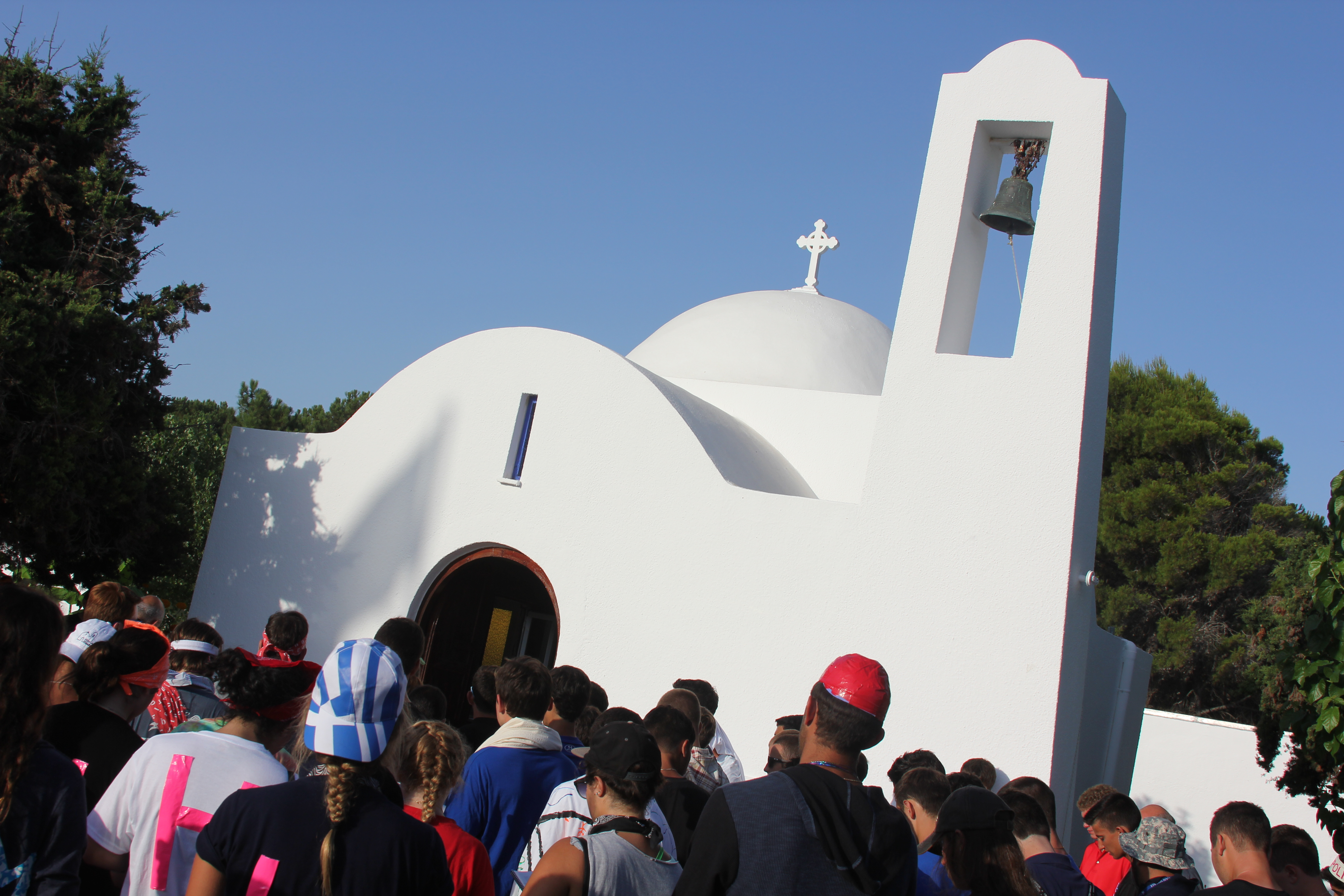
The Chapel at Ionian Village is dedicated to Saint Iakovos, the brother of our Lord. Every morning and every night, campers and Staff gather here to worship together. The Chapel is located in the middle of the campus, and is the middle of everything we do at Ionian Village.

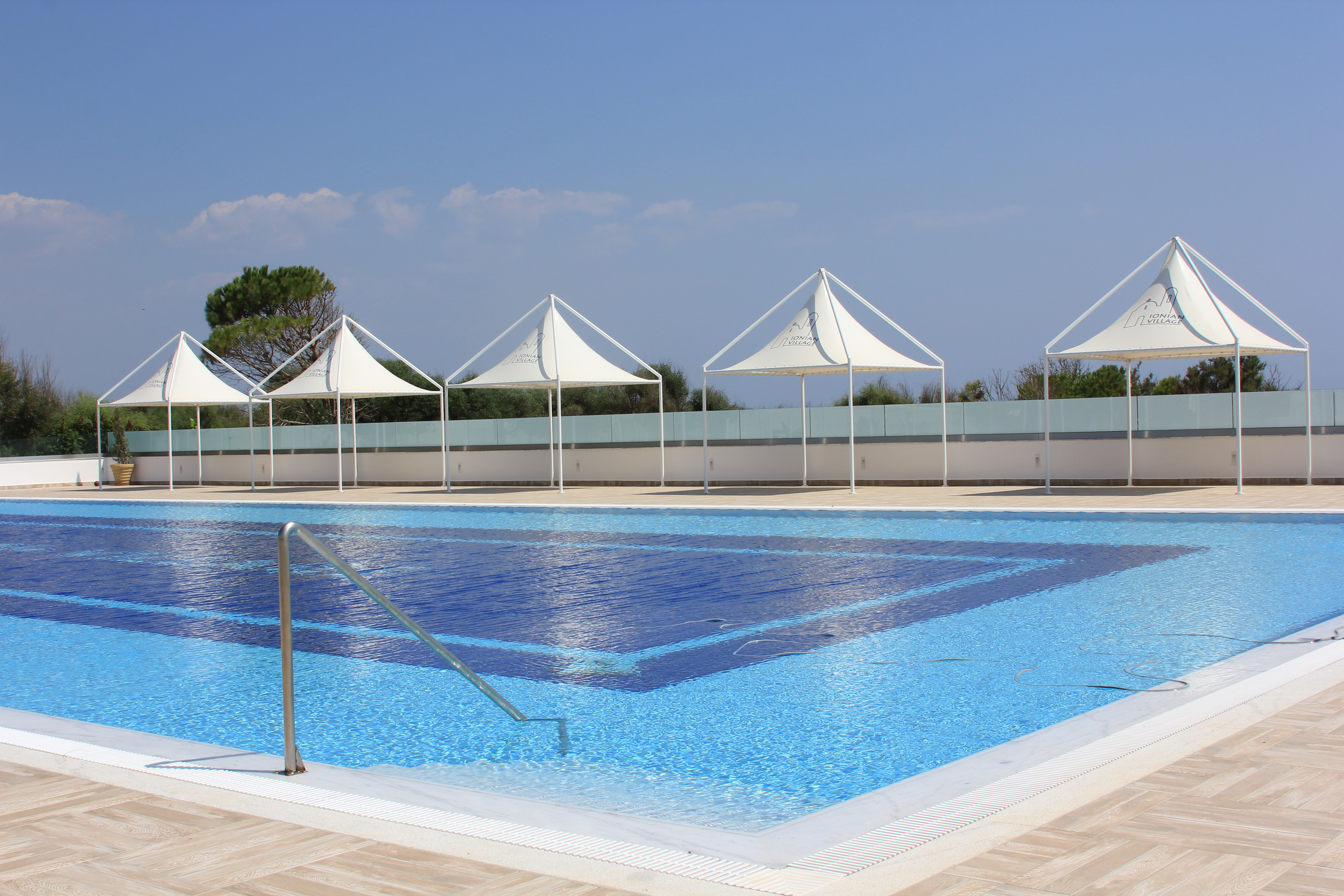
Renovated in 2013 thanks to a grant from the FAITH Endowment, the Ionian Village pool is a state of the art facility. A fully chlorinated, filtered pool with space for everyone at camp to come and hang out and enjoy the weather. When not at the beach, the camp can be found at the pool, jamming out to music as they work on their tans.

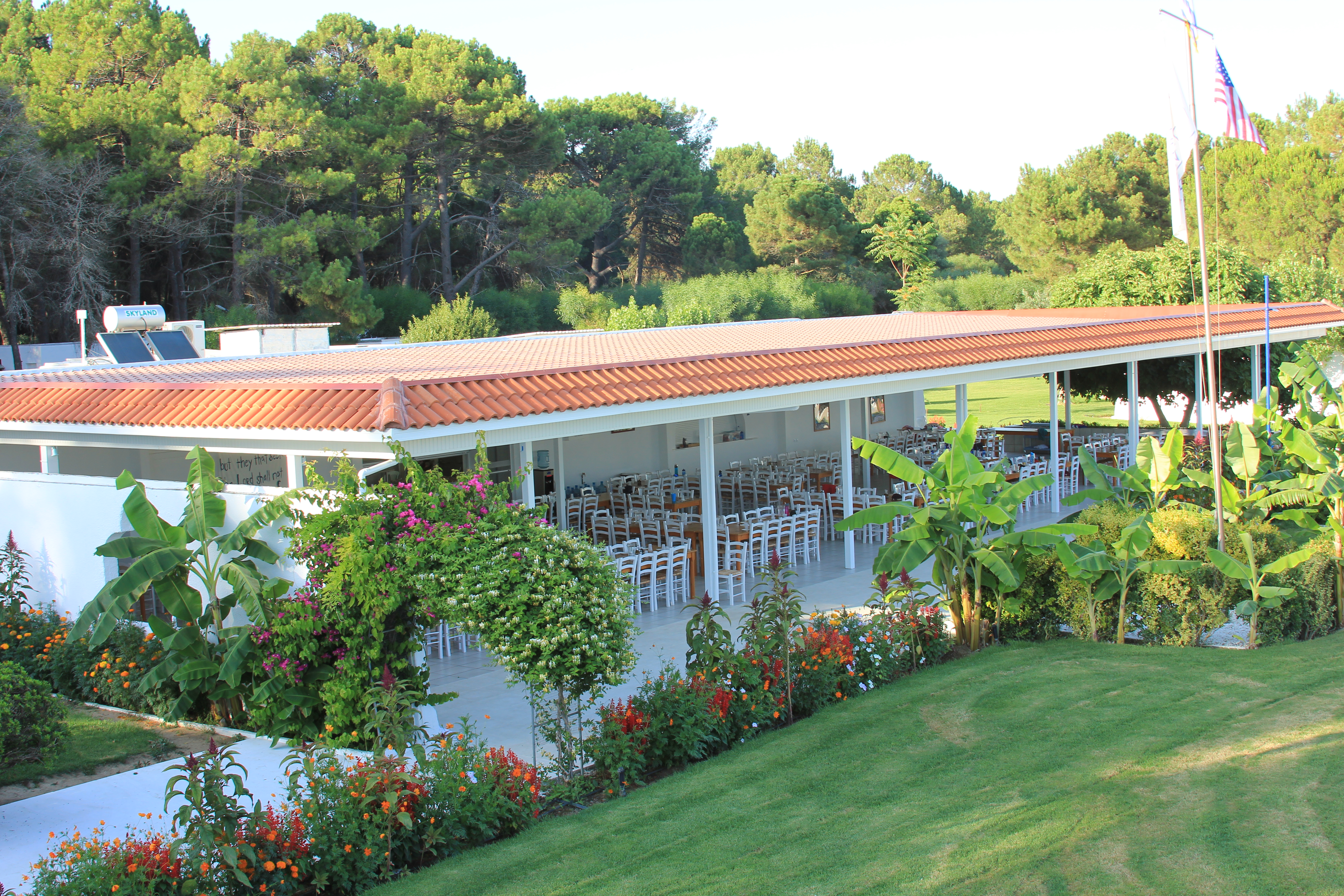
Commonly known as The "Trap”, the Trapezaria is a covered eating space is where the camp gathers three times a day to partake in the amazing food that Kyria Sophia offers the campers daily!

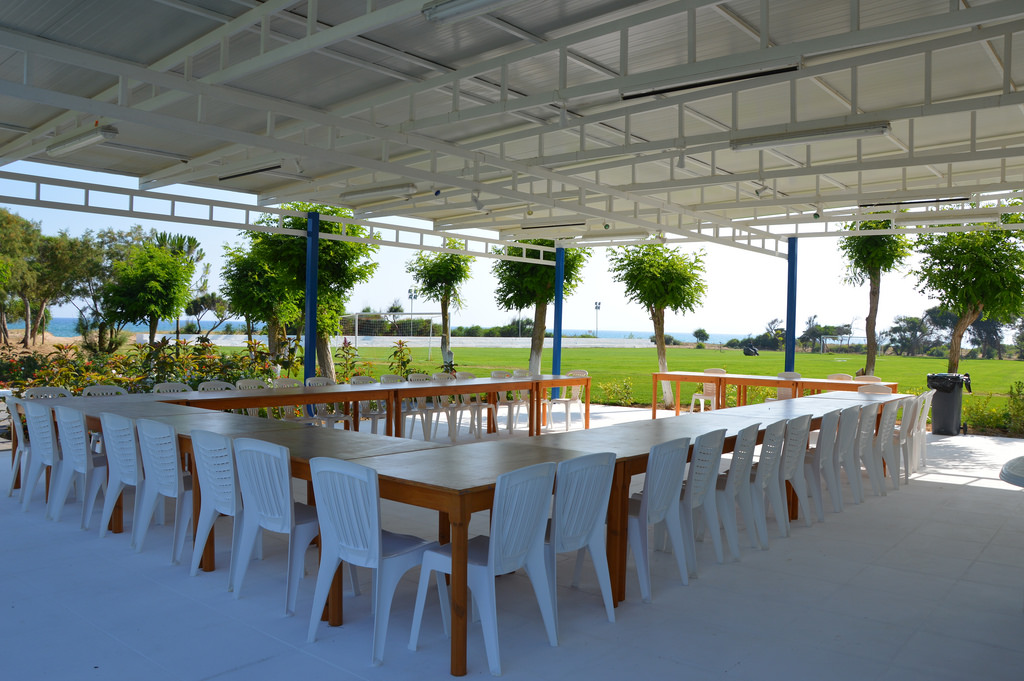
One of the programmatic sessions of the day, the Arts and Crafts Pavillon is home to the creative spirit of our campers, where they work on different projects to take home, as well as to beautify the campus.

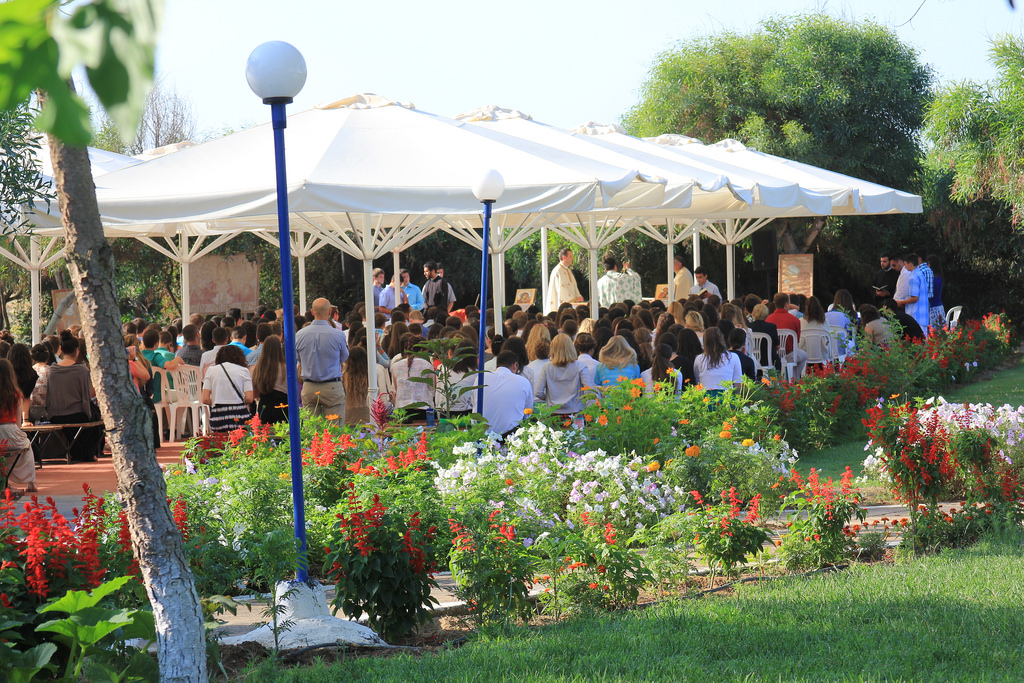
Every Sunday, the entire camp gathers right next to the sea to worship Jesus Christ and receive His body and blood during the Divine Liturgy.

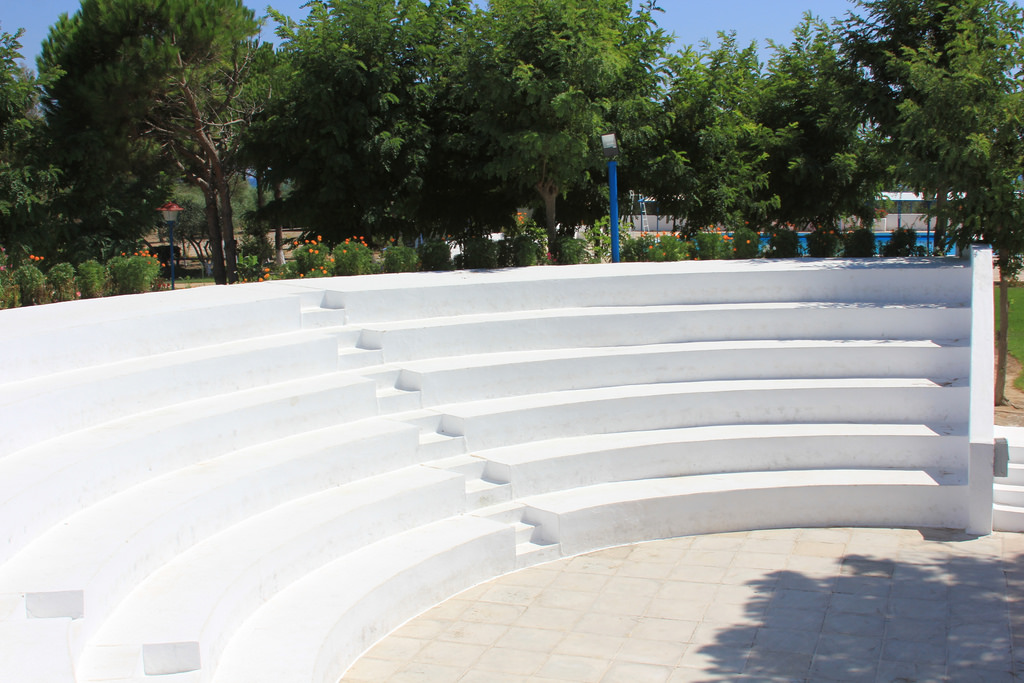
The Amphitheater is home to many of the evening activities of Ionian Village. Whether its Greek Invasion, the Pentathlon, Music Fest or Night with God, most evening campers can be found here as the sun fades away and the stars come out.

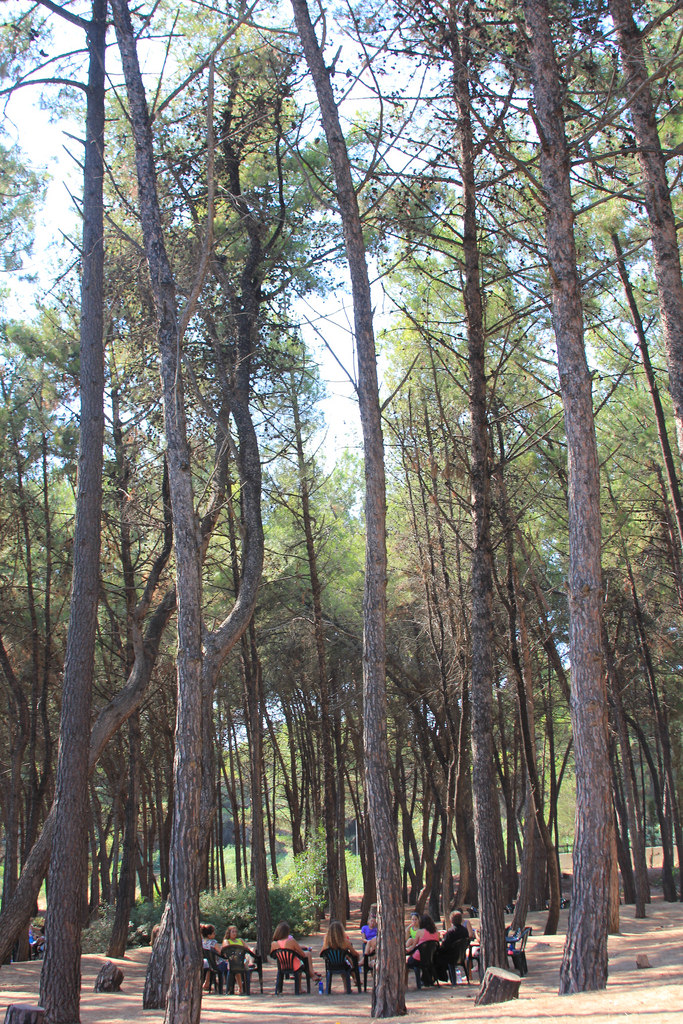
A sacred space, the Pines are home to our Orthodox Life sessions, where campers and Staff have discussions about their faith and their relationships with God.
