= Let's Explore Diabetes with Owls =

2013 essay collection by David Sedaris

Let's Explore Diabetes With Owls
- First edition
- Author: David Sedaris
- Language: English
- Genre: Essay collection
- Publisher: Little, Brown and Company
- Publication date: April 23, 2013
- Publication place: United States
- Media type: Print (hardcover)
- Pages: 288 pages
- ISBN: 978-0-316-15469-7
- Preceded by: Squirrel Seeks Chipmunk: A Modest Bestiary
- Followed by: Calypso

Let's Explore Diabetes With Owls is a collection of narrative essays by David Sedaris. The book was released on April 23, 2013. It debuted at the Number One Spot on the New York Times Bestseller List. Sedaris has said the title was one he had considered for his previous book, Squirrel Seeks Chipmunk and was inspired by a fan's suggestion that he inscribe a book with a message along the lines of "explore your inner feelings.” "I never write what people ask me so I said, 'I'll keep the word explore' and I wrote, 'let's explore diabetes with owls.'"

== Essays ==
1. Dentists Without Borders
2. Attaboy
3. Think Differenter
4. Memory Laps
5. A Friend in the Ghetto
6. Loggerheads
7. If I Ruled the World
8. Easy, Tiger
9. Laugh, Kookaburra
10. Standing Still
11. Just a Quick E-mail
12. A Guy Walks into a Bar Car
13. Author, Author
14. Obama!!!!!
15. Standing By
16. I Break for Traditional Marriage
17. Understanding Understanding Owls
18. #2 to Go
19. Health-Care Freedom and Why I Want My Country Back
20. Now Hiring Friendly People
21. Rubbish
22. Day In, Day Out
23. Mind the Gap
24. A Cold Case
25. The Happy Place
26. Dog Days
