= Squirrel Seeks Chipmunk =

2010 short story collection by David Sedaris

Squirrel Seeks Chipmunk: A Modest Bestiary
- First edition cover
- Author: David Sedaris
- Illustrator: Ian Falconer
- Cover artist: Ian Falconer
- Language: English
- Genre: Essay collection, Fiction
- Publisher: Little, Brown and Company
- Publication date: September 28, 2010
- Publication place: United States
- Media type: Print (hardcover), audiobook
- Pages: 176 pp (first edition, hardcover)
- ISBN: 978-0-316-03839-3
- Preceded by: When You Are Engulfed in Flames
- Followed by: Let's Explore Diabetes With Owls

Squirrel Seeks Chipmunk: A Modest Bestiary (titled Squirrel Seeks Chipmunk: A Wicked Bestiary outside the United States) is a collection of animal-themed humorous short stories by memoirist and humorist David Sedaris. The collection was published in September 2010.

Sedaris did not give the animals names, using only such names as 'chipmunk' and 'squirrel.' Animals, he said, don't need description. Sedaris said in an October 2010 interview with The Washington Post,

If I wrote, "Phillip and Amanda had been dating for two weeks when they ran out of things to talk about", I would have to give you a whole description. But, everyone knows what a squirrel and a chipmunk look like. So, I wrote it as, "The squirrel and the chipmunk had been dating for two weeks when they ran out of things to talk about."

Sedaris was inspired after reading a book of stories from South African mythology about anthropomorphic animals. Believing he could do better with a modern twist, he wrote 25 stories over two years, with the aim to ensure a high quality book by cutting ten of the 25.

== Stories ==
1. "The Cat and the Baboon"
2. "The Migrating Warblers"
3. "The Squirrel and the Chipmunk" (Note: Previously published as "So a Squirrel and a Chipmunk Walk into a Bar")
4. "The Toad, The Turtle, and the Duck"
5. "The Motherless Bear" (Note: In the audio edition of the book, this story is read by actress/singer Elaine Stritch.)
6. "The Mouse and the Snake"
7. "The Parenting Storks"
8. "The Faithful Setter"
9. "The Crow and the Lamb"
10. "The Sick Rat and the Healthy Rat" (Note: Previously published as "The White Rat")
11. "The Cow and the Turkey"
12. "The Vigilant Rabbit"
13. "The Judicious Brown Chicken"
14. "The Parrot and the Potbellied Pig"
15. "Hello Kitty"
16. "The Grieving Owl"

Sedaris says that title character of "The Vigilant Rabbit" is based on an elderly TSA official who demanded that he remove his vest.

At least six of the stories have been read on This American Life, a US radio program to which Sedaris has been a frequent contributor. These include: "The Cat and the Baboon", a fable about gossip and the service industry; "The Cow and the Turkey", in which barnyard animals play Secret Santa; "The Squirrel and the Chipmunk", a fable about a squirrel, a chipmunk, and a love that could never be; "Hello Kitty", in which predators and prey meet in an Alcoholics Anonymous program in prison; "The Parrot and the Potbellied Pig", about finding happiness in spite of the others' expectations; and "The Sick Rat and the Healthy Rat", about the relationship between positive thinking and physical health.
