= Santaland Diaries =

1992 essay by David Sedaris

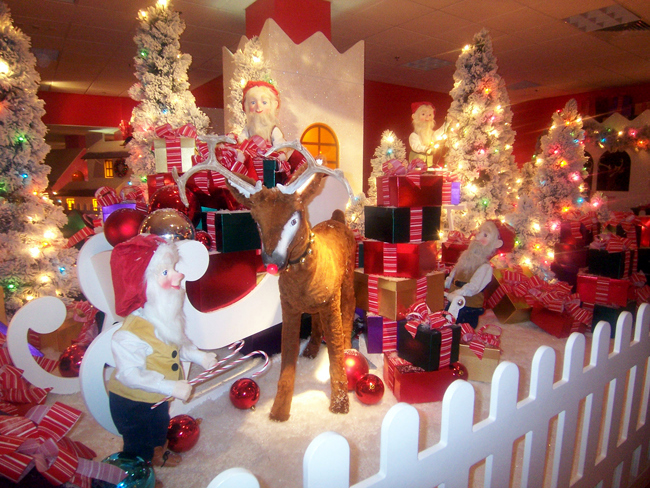
A Macy's Santaland in Portland, Oregon (2008)

"Santaland Diaries" is an essay written by David Sedaris. It is a humorous account of Sedaris' stint working as a Christmas elf in "Santaland" at Macy's department store in New York City.

Sedaris first read the essay on National Public Radio's Morning Edition on December 23, 1992. The piece was well received, and provided Sedaris with his first major break. Sedaris stated at the time, "It seems that everyone in the world was listening to the radio that day."

Sedaris later published the essay in the collections Barrel Fever (1994) and Holidays on Ice (1997). A much longer version of the piece first aired on December 20, 1996, on the Public Radio International program This American Life. In 1996, Joe Mantello adapted Sedaris' essay for the stage as a one-man, one-act play, which debuted (as The Santaland Diaries) at the Atlantic Theater Company in New York City on November 7, 1996. Timothy Olyphant originated the role. Mantello's adaptation has since become a seasonal staple of regional, college, and high-school theatre.

In 2020, Sedaris admitted that he was unhappy with the popularity of Santaland Diaries and said, "I have no idea why that went over the way that it did."

== Factual accuracy ==
Although Sedaris has claimed that the account is true, there are different versions, and fact-checking by This American Life and others in the wake of the Mike Daisey Foxconn controversy has clouded the issue. In 2007, writing for The New Republic, Alexander S. Heard fact-checked various aspects of Sedaris's stories, including Santaland Diaries, and found that several aspects were exaggerated and manufactured, although Sedaris did work in Macy's during the time period represented. Although some defended Sedaris by stating that his intention was to entertain, not provide accurate information as in the case of Daisey, NPR's executive editor of news programming has stated that a reader alert is warranted.
