= Dress Your Family in Corduroy and Denim =

2004 essay collection by David Sedaris

- Author: David Sedaris
- Cover artist: Jacket design by Chip Kidd
- Language: English
- Genre: Essay collection
- Publisher: Little, Brown and Company
- Publication date: June 1, 2004
- Publication place: United States
- Media type: Print (hardback and paperback)
- Pages: 272 (hardcover)
- ISBN: 0-316-14346-4 (first edition, hardcover)
- OCLC: 53138732
- Dewey Decimal: 814/.54 22
- LC Class: PS3569.E314 R47 2004

Dress Your Family in Corduroy and Denim is a collection of essays by American humorist David Sedaris. It was released in the United States by Little, Brown and Company on June 1, 2004. The essays detail the author's upbringing in Raleigh, North Carolina, his relationships with family members, and his work and life in both New York City and France.

The book received praise upon its release, with critics from such publications as The New York Times and Entertainment Weekly highlighting its focus on Sedaris's family as the heart of the entire collection. Reviews also noted an evolution in Sedaris's writing, finding Dress Your Family in Corduroy and Denim's essays to be more introspective, somber, adult, and emotionally resonant than the author's earlier, more hyperbolic material. The book debuted at No. 1 on The New York Times Best Seller list for Hardcover nonfiction and won the 2004 Lambda Literary Award for Humor. It was a 2005 Stonewall Honor Book in Non-Fiction.

== Background ==
Dress Your Family in Corduroy and Denim is a collection of twenty-two essays by the author David Sedaris. Twenty-one of them had previously appeared in publications such as The New Yorker and Esquire. Sedaris originally intended to name the book Repeat After Me, taken from his favorite story of the bunch, but he worried that it was too similar to the title of his then-most recent essay collection, Me Talk Pretty One Day. He changed the name when his partner Hugh dreamed of a man reading a book entitled Dress Your Family in Corduroy and Denim, which he thought was a great title, even if he could not see its relevance to the contents of the book.

The book includes a number of stories about Sedaris's family and childhood, which was not a conscious decision on the author's part. During an interview with NPR's Fresh Air, he told host Terry Gross that whenever he received a themed writing assignment from The New Yorker, or from Ira Glass for a This American Life segment, he found his youth to be a deep well from which he could usually draw an appropriate story. He also told Gross that he tried to not fall into the trap of portraying himself as a cleverer child than he had actually been—he firmly believed that he had not in fact been particularly clever, athletic, or attractive as a boy.

Dress Your Family in Corduroy and Denim's cover art was created by graphic designer Chip Kidd. It features the torso of a naked doll, and Kidd, speaking to Time magazine, cited it as a cover that needed to have visceral appeal while also being appropriate to the book's title.

== Essays ==
1. "Us and Them"
  - Childhood memories of a family "who don't believe in TV"
2. "Let It Snow"
  - The day when Sedaris's mother locked her children out in the snow
3. "The Ship Shape"
  - Childhood memories of the second home that his father never bought
4. "Full House"
  - A childhood game of strip poker gives the young Sedaris a touching moment
5. "Consider the Stars"
  - Reflecting on the cool kid at school
6. "Monie Changes Everything"
  - Sedaris's rich aunt
7. "The Change in Me"
  - The 13-year-old Sedaris wants to act like a hippie
8. "Hejira"
  - Sedaris' father kicks him out of his house due to his homosexuality
9. "Slumus Lordicus"
  - Sedaris's father's experiences as a landlord of a Section 8 apartment complex in the early 1980s
10. "The Girl Next Door"
  - Sedaris's relationship with a girl from a troubled family
11. "Blood Work"
  - A case of mistaken identity while cleaning houses
12. "The End of the Affair"
  - Sedaris and Hugh's different reactions to a love story
13. "Repeat After Me"
  - Sedaris's visit to his sister Lisa, and his family's feelings about being the subject of his essays
14. "Six to Eight Black Men"
  - Thoughts about the traditional Dutch Christmas story, among other cultural oddities
15. "Rooster at the Hitchin' Post"
  - Sedaris's younger brother is born and gets married
16. "Possession"
  - Searching for a new apartment, and Anne Frank's house
17. "Put a Lid on It"
  - A visit to Sedaris's sister Tiffany's home, and their relationship
18. "A Can of Worms"
  - Sedaris's mind wanders as he, Hugh, and a friend eat at a diner
19. "Chicken in the Henhouse"
  - Prejudiced attitudes towards homosexuals in America
20. "Who's the Chef?"
  - Bickering between two people in a long-term relationship
21. "Baby Einstein"
  - The arrival of his brother's first baby
22. "Nuit of the Living Dead"
  - A late night encounter at home in rural France

"Us and Them," "Let it Snow," "The Ship Shape," "Repeat After Me," "Six to Eight Black Men," "Possession," and "Nuit of the Living Dead" were later reprinted in Sedaris's 2020 collection The Best of Me.

== Reception ==
Augusten Burroughs of Entertainment Weekly called it the best book of Sedaris's career, deeming it a "brilliant comic performance" with "a deftly shaken cocktail of wit, weirdness, and melancholy," and prose that he found both elegant and skillful. The essay "Put a Lid On It" was singled out as a particularly moving and tear-jerking story, and "Rooster at the Hitchin' Post" as "screamingly, blood-vessel-burstingly funny." Kirkus Reviews highlighted Sedaris's deadpan humor and sense of life's absurdity, and Tasha Robinson of The A.V. Club lauded the book's humor as "down-to-earth, mutedly funny."

The book's spotlight on Sedaris's family was well-received, with Kirkus Reviews noting that his lacerations of them were "not without affection even when the sting is strongest." Burroughs's review also praised Sedaris's affectionate detailing of his family's eccentricities, and Robinson felt that it was one of the collection's greatest strengths, helping showcase the author's "evolution toward plainer and sparer storytelling." Writer Michiko Kakutani, reviewing the collection for The New York Times, called Sedaris's family reminiscences the heart of the book, and suggested that they "attest to the author's evolution from comic writer to full-fledged memoirist."

Kakutani also observed a strain of introspection that was new to Sedaris and thought that it differed from his earlier, self-deprecating stand-upesque material, coming off as a more Chekhovian brand of comedy. She also felt that unlike Sedaris's earlier collections, Dress Your Family in Corduroy and Denim was a book "with more emotional resonance, a more complex aftertaste." Robinson asserted that Sedaris's comedy was more withdrawn, somber, and adult than usual, as well as less hyperbolic, but she also saw a familiar wry charm as he discussed events that were just as outlandish as ever.

Also writing for The New York Times, critic Stephen Metcalf mused on the author's evolution by opining that his newfound success and happiness were "harder and harder to retail as genuine angst." He observed that Sedaris's now-comfortable life was forcing him to mine his own conscience for story material, and that Dress Your Family in Corduroy and Denim included a "strange, new attitude of self-reckoning" on Sedaris's part. He praised the new outlook, believing that Sedaris had perfected "the quick, tidy, sermonical soul-search" that could balance out his "plush new life as a publishing-world rock star." He singled out Possession, a story about touring the Anne Frank House, as a humorous dig by Sedaris at his own conscience, but Kakutani disagreed, calling it one of two stories that "feel like strained, self-conscious efforts to generate material" and which should not have been included.

Dress Your Family in Corduroy and Denim was released on June 1, 2004, and it debuted at No. 1 on The New York Times Best Seller list for Hardcover nonfiction for the week of June 20. It remained in the top spot for one more week and ultimately spent sixteen weeks on the list. It went on to win the 2004 Award for Humor from the Lambda Literary Awards, an organization that champions LGBT books and authors.

Preceded by Eats, Shoots & Leaves by Lynne Truss	#1 New York Times Best Seller Non-Fiction; June 20, 2004 – June 27, 2004	Succeeded by Big Russ and Me by Tim Russert
