= Barrel Fever =

1994 book by David Sedaris

- First edition
- Author: David Sedaris
- Language: English
- Genre: Essay and short story collection
- Publisher: Little, Brown and Company
- Publication date: June 1994
- Publication place: United States
- Media type: Print (hardback & paperback)
- Pages: 196 pp (first edition, hardcover)
- ISBN: 0-316-77940-7 (first edition, hardcover)
- OCLC: 38565150
- Followed by: Naked

Barrel Fever is a 1994 collection of short stories and essays by American humorist David Sedaris. The first section consists of pieces clearly labeled as short fiction and the second half contains autobiographical essays, a distinction that is not made in his subsequent books.

The most famous of the essays is "SantaLand Diaries", the essay that made Sedaris famous when he read it on National Public Radio in 1992. The essay tells of his experiences working as an elf named Crumpet at Macy's. The other is "Diary of a Smoker", which was made into a 13-minute film shown at Sundance Film Festival by Matthew Modine.

The book was on bestseller lists in Chicago and San Francisco.

== Background ==
For years before Barrel Fever's publication, David Sedaris would write stories and, according to him, "just stick them in a drawer," as it did not occur to him that anyone would ever want to publish them. After he started appearing on NPR's This American Life, three different publishing houses called him to ask if he had a book of his stories, and he noted "it was convenient because I just happened to have one in my drawer."

== Contents ==
=== Stories ===
1. Parade
2. Music for Lovers
3. The Last You'll Hear from Me
4. My Manuscript
5. Firestone
6. We Get Along
7. Glen's Homophobia Newsletter Vol. 3, No. 2
8. Don's Story
9. Season's Greetings to Our Friends and Family!!!
10. Jamboree
11. After Malison
12. Barrel Fever

=== Essays ===
1. Diary of a Smoker
2. Giantess
3. The Curly Kind
4. SantaLand Diaries

== Reception ==
A 1994 review in Newsweek magazine said that despite Sedaris's fondness for "high-concept premises" and tendency to "eschew deep thoughts", "there's something delicious about the way he lampoons his characters, the way he lets everybody burn on their own private bonfire of vanity. This is a writer who's cleaned our toilets and will never look at us the same way."

A 2007 article in The New Republic criticized Sedaris's method of blurring fact and fiction in several of his books, including Barrel Fever. Alex Heard, who once edited Sedaris's work and said he started out as a fan. Heard noted that although the short story "My Manuscript" was clearly presented as fiction, many reviewers took his description of a guitar teacher called "Mr. Chatam" as fact. To further complicate things, upon investigation it turned out that there actually was a guitar teacher in North Carolina, who fit the description in some ways, but had been exaggerated for comedic effect.
