= David Sedaris =

American humorist and author (born 1956)

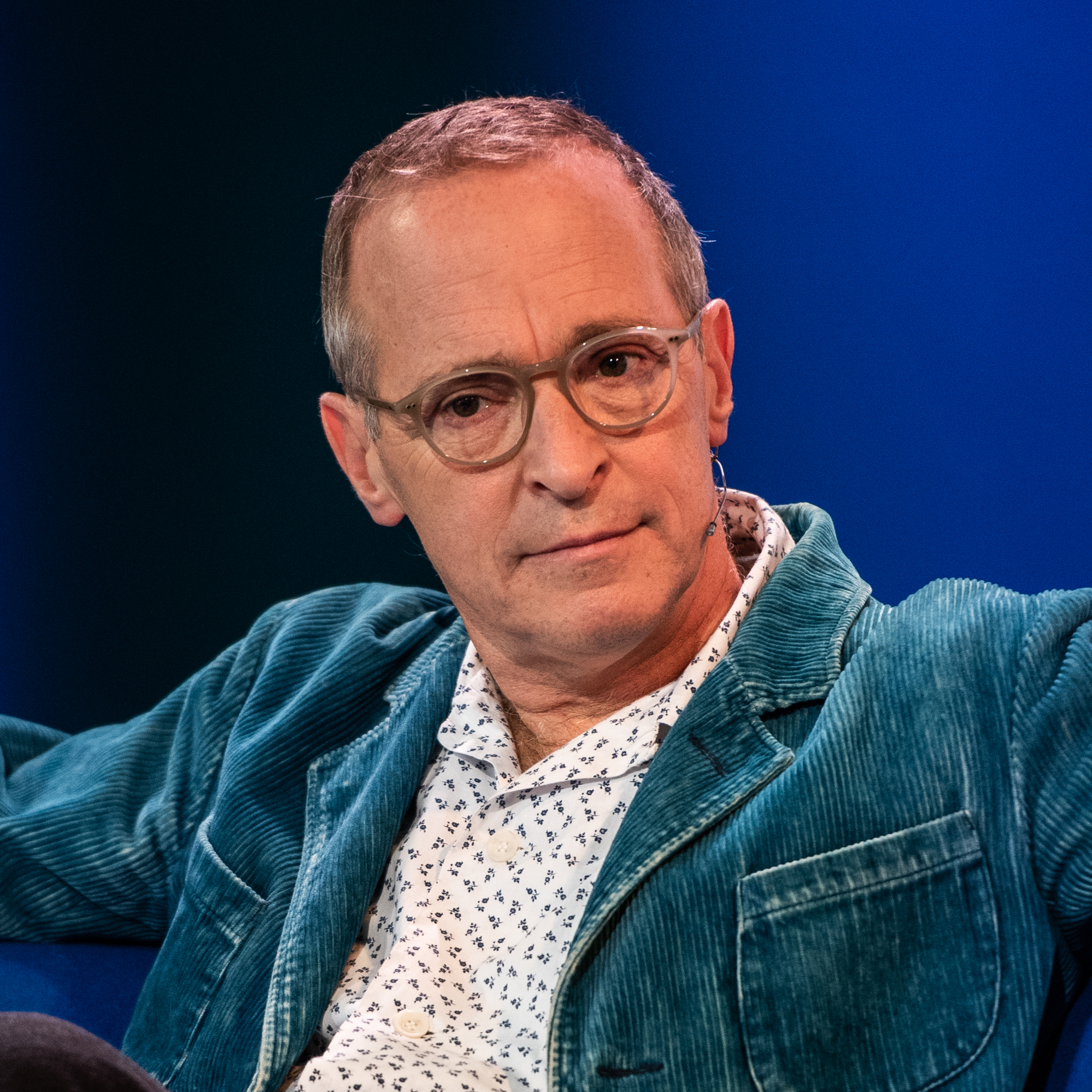
- Sedaris at the Frankfurt Book Fair in 2018
- Born: David Raymond Sedaris; December 26, 1956 (age 69); Johnson City, New York, U.S.
- Education: School of the Art Institute of Chicago (BA)
- Occupations: Humorist, comedian, author, and radio contributor
- Spouse: Hugh Hamrick (m. 2016–present)
- Relatives: Amy Sedaris (sister)
- Writing career
- Genres: Humor, essays
- Notable awards: Thurber Prize for American Humor; American Academy of Arts and Letters

David Raymond Sedaris (/sɪˈdɛərɪs/ sih-DAIR-iss; born December 26, 1956) is an American humorist, comedian, author, and radio contributor. He was publicly recognized in 1992 when National Public Radio broadcast his essay "Santaland Diaries". He published his first collection of essays and short stories, Barrel Fever, in 1994. His next book, Naked (1997), became his first of a series of New York Times Bestsellers, and his 2000 collection Me Talk Pretty One Day won the Thurber Prize for American Humor.

Much of Sedaris's humor is autobiographical and self-deprecating and often concerns his family life, his middle-class upbringing in the suburbs of Raleigh, North Carolina, his Greek heritage, homosexuality, jobs, education, drug use, and obsessive behaviors, as well as his life in France, London, New York, and the South Downs in England. He is the brother and writing collaborator of actress Amy Sedaris.

In 2019, Sedaris was elected to the American Academy of Arts and Letters.

== Early life and education ==
Sedaris was born in Johnson City, New York, to Sharon Elizabeth (née Leonard) (d. 1991) and Louis Harry "Lou" Sedaris (1923–2021), an IBM engineer. His mother was Anglo-American. His father was born in the U.S. to immigrants from Apidea in Laconia, Greece. His mother was Protestant, and his father was Greek Orthodox, the faith in which David was raised.

The Sedaris family moved when David was young, and he grew up in a suburban area of Raleigh, the second oldest child of six. His siblings, from oldest to youngest, are Lisa, Gretchen, Amy, Tiffany, and Paul ("the Rooster"). Tiffany died by suicide in 2013, a subject David discusses in the essay "Now We Are Five", which was published in The New Yorker and included in his 2018 essay collection Calypso.

After graduating from Jesse O. Sanderson High School in Raleigh, Sedaris briefly attended Western Carolina University before transferring to, and dropping out of, Kent State University in 1977. In his teens and twenties, David dabbled in visual and performance art. He describes his lack of success in several of his essays.

Sedaris moved to Chicago in 1983, and graduated from the School of the Art Institute of Chicago in 1987.

== Career ==
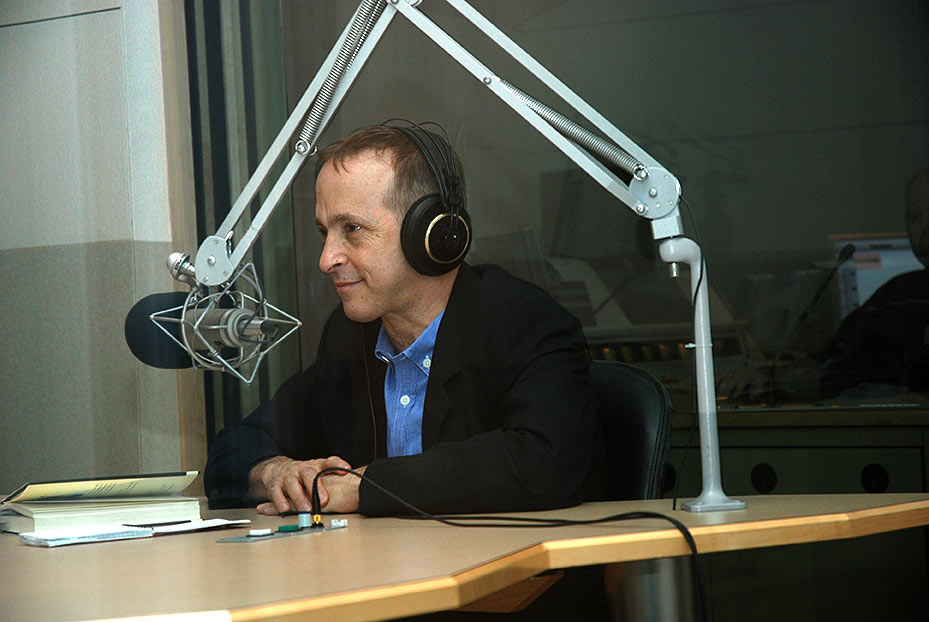
Sedaris at WBUR studios in June 2008

While working odd jobs in Raleigh, Chicago, and New York City, Sedaris was discovered in a Chicago club by radio host Ira Glass. Sedaris was reading a diary he had kept since 1977. Impressed with his work, Glass asked him to appear on his weekly local program, The Wild Room. Referring to the opportunity, Sedaris said, "I owe everything to Ira ... My life just changed completely, like someone waved a magic wand." Sedaris's success on The Wild Room led to his National Public Radio debut on December 23, 1992, when he read a radio essay on Morning Edition titled "Santaland Diaries," which described his purported experiences as an elf at Macy's department store during Christmas in New York.

"Santaland Diaries" was a success with listeners and made Sedaris what The New York Times called "a minor phenomenon." He began recording a monthly segment for NPR, which was based on his diary entries and was edited and produced by Glass, and he also signed a two-book deal with Little, Brown and Company. In 1993, Sedaris told The New York Times he was publishing his first book, a collection of stories and essays, and he had 70 pages written of his second book, a novel "about a man who keeps a diary and whom Mr. Sedaris described as 'not me, but a lot like me'."

Sedaris tours regularly, reading new stories to his audiences. He says that he enjoys it for the compensation and for the attention, "plus I get to be in front of an audience and see if a story works.”

=== Collections and mainstream success ===
In 1994, Sedaris published Barrel Fever, a collection of stories and essays. He became a frequent contributor when Ira Glass began a weekly hour-long PRI/Chicago Public Radio show, This American Life, in 1995. Sedaris began writing essays for Esquire and The New Yorker. In 1997, he published another collection of essays, Naked, which won the Randy Shilts Award for Gay Non-Fiction from Publishing Triangle in 1998.

Naked and his subsequent four essay collections, Holidays on Ice (1997), Me Talk Pretty One Day (2000), Dress Your Family in Corduroy and Denim (2004), and When You Are Engulfed in Flames (2008), became New York Times Best Sellers.

Me Talk Pretty One Day was written mostly in France, over seven months, and it was published in 2000 to "practically unanimous rave reviews." For that book, Sedaris won the 2001 Thurber Prize for American Humor.

In April 2001, Variety reported Sedaris had sold the Me Talk Pretty One Day film rights to director Wayne Wang, who was adapting four stories from the book for Columbia Pictures. Wang had completed the script and begun casting when Sedaris asked to "get out of it," after he and his sister worried how their family might be portrayed. He wrote about the conversation and its aftermath in the essay "Repeat After Me." Sedaris recounted that Wang was "a real prince... I didn't want him to be mad at me, but he was so grown up about it. I never saw how it could be turned into a movie anyway."

In 2004, Sedaris published Dress Your Family in Corduroy and Denim, which reached number 1 on The New York Times Nonfiction Best Seller List in June of that year. The audiobook of Dress Your Family, read by Sedaris, was nominated for a Grammy Award for Best Spoken Word Album. The same year, Sedaris was nominated for a Grammy Award for Best Comedy Album for his recording Live at Carnegie Hall. In March 2006, Ira Glass said that Sedaris's next book would be a collection of animal fables; during that year, Sedaris included several animal fables in his US book tour, and three of his fables were broadcast on This American Life.

In September 2007, a new Sedaris collection was announced for publication the following year. The collection's working title was All the Beauty You Will Ever Need, but Sedaris retitled it Indefinite Leave to Remain and finally settled on the title When You Are Engulfed in Flames. Although at least one news source assumed the book would be fables, Sedaris said in October 2007 that the collection might include a "surprisingly brief story about [his] decision to quit smoking," along with other stories about various topics, including chimpanzees at a typing school, and people visiting [him] in France. The book was described as his darkest, as it dealt with themes of death and dying.

In December 2008, Sedaris received an honorary doctorate from Binghamton University.

In April 2010, BBC Radio 4 aired Meet David Sedaris, a four-part series of essays, which Sedaris read before a live audience. A second series of six programs began airing on BBC Radio 4 Extra in June 2011, with a third series beginning in September 2012. In July 2017, the sixth series was aired and by 2025 the series had reached its 10th season on Radio 4.

In 2010, he released a collection of stories, Squirrel Seeks Chipmunk: A Modest Bestiary. Sedaris released a collection of essays, Let's Explore Diabetes with Owls, in 2013 and, in 2017, published a collection of his 1977–2002 diaries, Theft By Finding. Also in 2013, the film adaptation of an essay from Naked was released as a feature-length movie, C.O.G.

In July 2011, Sedaris's essay "Chicken Toenails, Anyone", published in The Guardian, garnered some criticism over concerns that it was insensitive towards China and Chinese culture.

A frequent guest of late-night US talk show host Craig Ferguson, in April 2012, Sedaris joined Ferguson and the cast of CBS's The Late, Late Show in Scotland for a theme week filmed in and around Cumbernauld and in Edinburgh. The five weeknight episodes aired in May 2012.

Sedaris's ninth book, Let's Explore Diabetes with Owls, was released in April 2013.

In 2014, he participated in Do I Sound Gay?, a documentary film by David Thorpe about stereotypes of gay men's speech patterns.

He appeared along with his sister Amy as special guest judges on season 8, episode 8, of RuPaul's Drag Race. He also appeared as a guest in the Adult Swim television series FishCenter Live.

Sedaris guest starred on the Netflix animated comedy-drama series BoJack Horseman as the mother of Princess Carolyn, voiced by Amy Sedaris.

In 2019, Sedaris was elected to the American Academy of Arts and Letters. A greatest-hits compilation of his essays and short fiction entitled The Best of Me was released in November 2020.

In 2022, he published Happy Go Lucky, in which he reflected on his relationship with his recently deceased father.

In 2025, Sedaris was awarded an honorary doctorate of literature by the University of Chichester.

=== Truth of nonfiction work ===
In 2007, in an article in The New Republic, Alexander S. Heard stated that much of Sedaris's work is insufficiently factual to justify being marketed as nonfiction. Several published responses to Heard's article argued that Sedaris's readers are aware that his descriptions and stories are intentionally exaggerated and manipulated to maximize comic effect, while others used the controversy as a springboard for discussing the liberties publishers are willing to take when calling books "nonfiction".

Subsequently, in the wake of a controversy involving Mike Daisey's dramatizing and embellishing his personal experiences at Chinese factories, during an excerpt from his theatrical monologue for This American Life, new attention was paid to the veracity of Sedaris's nonfiction stories. NPR labelled stories from Sedaris, such as "Santaland Diaries", as fiction, while This American Life fact checked stories, to the extent that memories and long-ago conversations can be checked. The New Yorker already subjected nonfiction stories written for that magazine to its comprehensive fact-checking policy.

=== The Talent Family ===
Sedaris has written several plays with his sister, actress Amy Sedaris, under the name "The Talent Family". These include Stump the Host (1993), Stitches (1994), One Woman Shoe, which co-starred David Rakoff (1995) and The Little Frieda Mysteries (1997). All were produced and presented by Meryl Vladimer while she was the artistic director of "the CLUB" at La MaMa, E.T.C. The Book of Liz (2001) was written by Sedaris and his sister Amy, and produced by Drama Dept. at The Greenwich Theater in New York.

=== The New Yorker ===
Sedaris has contributed over 40 essays to The New Yorker magazine and blog.

== Personal life ==
Sedaris, who is openly gay, lives with his husband, painter and set designer Hugh Hamrick. The two met in New York City in 1991, and in 1998, they moved to France together, later relocating to England. Sedaris frequently mentions Hamrick in his stories, and used to describe the two of them as the type of couple who would not be married. Sedaris and Hamrick were married in 2016 at a courthouse in Beaufort, North Carolina, though the formal union was kept private until 2026.

In 2013, he purchased a beach house on Emerald Isle, North Carolina; many of the stories in his 2018 collection Calypso are set there. Sedaris currently divides his time between Rackham, West Sussex, England, and New York City.

Sedaris is known for regularly spending hours removing litter from roads and highways near Rackham. His hobby has earned him the nickname of "Pig Pen" locally, and a waste vehicle has been named after him.

== Bibliography ==
=== Story and essay collections ===
- Origins of the Underclass: And Other Stories (1992)
- Barrel Fever: Stories and Essays (1994)
- Holidays on Ice (1997)
- Naked (1997)
- Me Talk Pretty One Day (2000)
- Dress Your Family in Corduroy and Denim (2004)
- When You Are Engulfed in Flames (2008)
- Squirrel Seeks Chipmunk: A Modest Bestiary (2010)
- Let's Explore Diabetes With Owls (2013)
- Calypso (2018)
- The Best of Me (2020)
- Happy-Go-Lucky (2022)
- The Land and Its People (2026)

=== Diaries ===
- Theft by Finding: Diaries (1977–2002) (2017)
- A Carnival of Snackery: Diaries (2003–2020) (2021)
- David Sedaris Diaries: A Visual Compendium (2017)

=== Children's books ===
- Pretty Ugly (with Ian Falconer; 2024)
- The Selfish Sister (with Bob Staake; 2026)

=== Radio shows ===
- Meet David Sedaris (since 2010)

=== As editor ===
- Children Playing Before a Statue of Hercules (2005)

=== Plays ===
- Stump the Host (1993)
- Stitches (1994)
- One-Woman Shoe (with Amy Sedaris; 1995)
- The Little Frieda Mysteries (1997)
- Santaland Diaries and Seasons Greetings (1998)
- The Book of Liz: A Play (with Amy Sedaris; 2002)

== Recordings ==
''Naked'' (read by David Sedaris)

- Released: 1997
- Format: Audiobook
- Label: Time Warner AudioBooks

''Dress Your Family in Corduroy and Denim'' (read by David Sedaris)

- Released: 2005
- Format: Audiobook
- Label: Hachette Audio

''David Sedaris: Live at Carnegie Hall'' (recorded live at Carnegie Hall on 22 October 2002)

- Released: 2003
- Format: CD / audiobook
- Label: Hachette Audio

''Me Talk Pretty One Day'' (read by David Sedaris)

- Released: 2006
- Format: Audiobook
- Label: Hachette Audio

''When You Are Engulfed in Flames'' (read by David Sedaris)

- Released: 2008
- Format: Audiobook
- Label: Hachette Audio

''Holidays on Ice'' (read by David Sedaris, Amy Sedaris, and Ann Magnuson)

- Released: 2008
- Format: Audiobook
- Label: Hachette Audio

''David Sedaris: Live for Your Listening Pleasure'' (live recordings of previously unreleased stories from multiple US venues)

- Released: 2009
- Format: CD / digital album
- Label: Hachette Audio

''Squirrel Seeks Chipmunk: A Modest Bestiary'' (read by multiple narrators including David Sedaris)

- Released: 2010
- Format: Audiobook
- Label: Hachette Audio

''Barrel Fever & Other Stories'' (read by David Sedaris)

- Released: 2016
- Format: Digital album / audiobook
- Label: Hachette Audio
