= Calypso (book) =

2018 essay collection by David Sedaris

- Author: David Sedaris
- Audio read by: David Sedaris
- Cover artist: Peter Mendelsund
- Language: American English
- Subject: Health, death, family
- Set in: England, Japan, United States
- Publisher: Little, Brown and Company, Blackstone Audio
- Publication date: May 29, 2018
- Publication place: United States
- Media type: Print, ebook, audiobook
- Pages: 261
- ISBN: 978-0316392389 (print)

Calypso is a collection of 21 semi-autobiographical essays by David Sedaris. It was published on May 29, 2018 by Little, Brown and Company. Fourteen of the 21 essays were previously published in a magazine or newspaper; some of these were published under a different title or in a different form.

== Essays ==
1. "Company Man" (Note: First published in The New Yorker)
2. "Now We Are Five"
3. "Little Guy"
4. "Stepping Out"
5. "A House Divided"
6. "The Perfect Fit"
7. "Leviathan"
8. "Your English Is So Good" (Note: First published in Condé Nast Traveller)
9. "Calypso" (Note: First published in The Guardian)
10. "A Modest Proposal"
11. "The Silent Treatment"
12. "Untamed"
13. "The One(s) Who Got Away"
14. "Sorry"
15. "Boo-hooey"
16. "A Number of the Reasons I've Been Depressed Lately" (Note: First published in The Paris Review)
17. "Why Aren't You Laughing?"
18. "I'm Still Standing"
19. "The Spirit World"
20. "And While You're Up There, Check On My Prostate" (Note: First published in Esquire)
21. "The Comey Memo"

== Synopsis ==
In Calypso, Sedaris writes primarily about his family and aging, as he is approaching the age his mother was when she died of cancer (62) and his sister Tiffany had recently died by suicide. He purchases a seaside vacation home in Emerald Isle, North Carolina, for the remaining siblings to spend time in with their father, now in his 90s, as they did growing up. He also discusses shopping for clothes in Japan with his sisters and a gastrointestinal virus he acquires while on book tour, an experience he views in terms of looming incontinence of old age.
