= Bidan =

Bidan may refer to:

- Bidan Community, an Aboriginal community in Western Australia
- Bidan Island, an island off the coast of Yan, Kedah, Malaysia
- Beidane, also Latinized as Bīdān or Bidān, an Arabic term used in Mauritania to refer to lighter-skinned Mauritanians

== Iran ==
- Bidan, Bushehr, a village
- Bidan, Hormozgan, a village
- Bidan, Baft, Kerman, a village
- Bidan, Zarand, Kerman, a village
- Bidan, South Khorasan, a village
- Bidan Sarzeh, Sistan and Baluchestan, a village
- Bidan-e Khvajeh, Kerman, a village
- Bidan-e Panj, Yazd, a village

== See also ==
- Biden (disambiguation)
- Bidin, a surname
- Bidon (disambiguation)
