= Public image of Joe Biden =

Public perception of U.S. politician Joe Biden

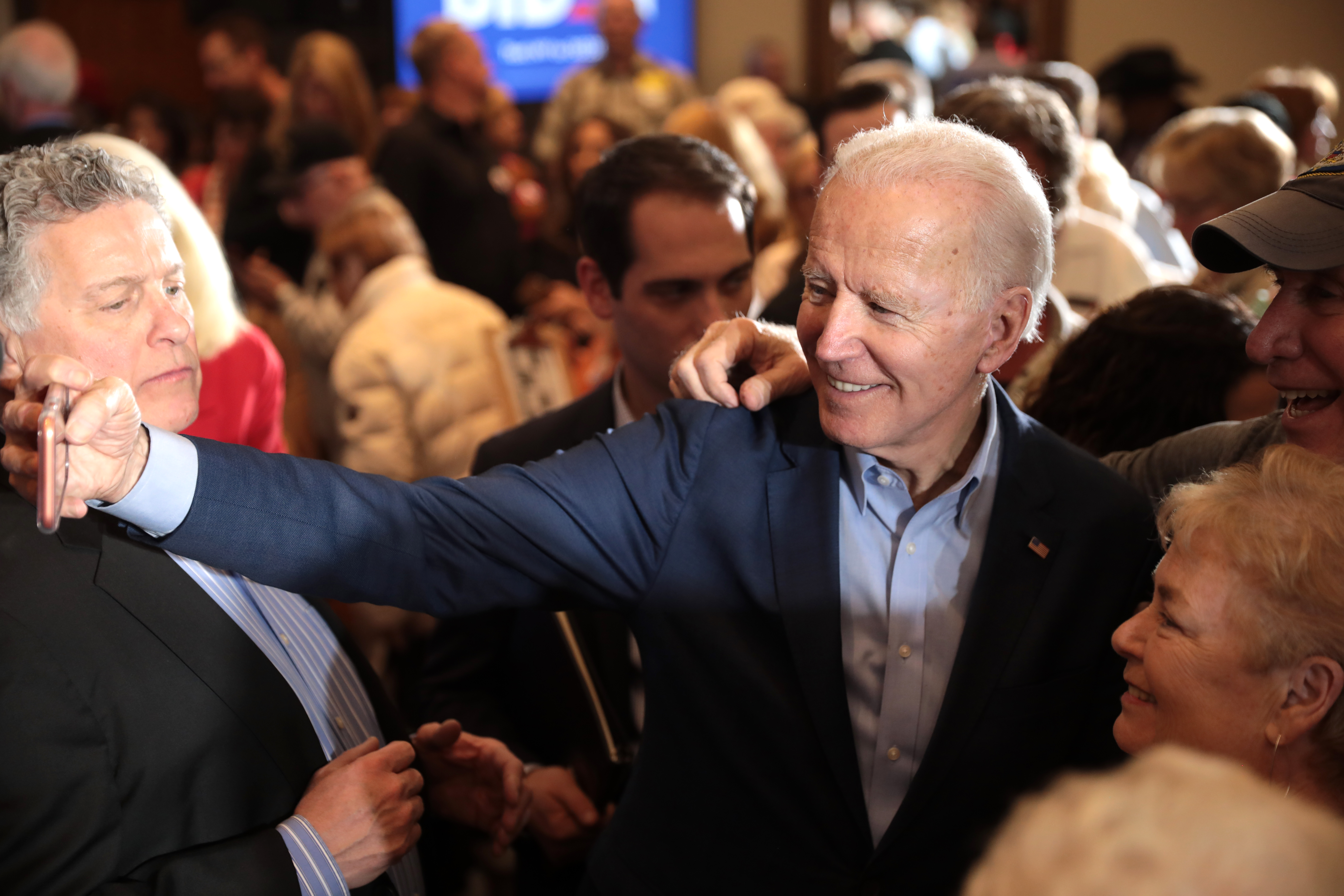
Joe Biden with supporters in 2019

Joe Biden, the 46th president of the United States, has been in the national spotlight for over half a century, ever since he won his first election to the United States Senate in 1972. Biden is seen as a figure with the tendency to commit gaffes. His capacity for empathy has been noted, as has his tendency for exaggeration.

Biden's approval ratings as president started strong, but significantly declined after the fall of Kabul on August 15, 2021. As the oldest president in US history, Biden's age and health have been the subject of discussion, with some polls finding the issue a subject of concern to a significant majority of Americans. A long-standing parody of Biden by The Onion, popular during his time as Barack Obama's vice president, is thought by some to have contributed positively to his public image.

== Reputation ==
During his Senate tenure, Joe Biden was consistently ranked among the least wealthy members, which he attributed to being elected at a young age. In November 2009, Biden's net worth was only $27,012, but it had increased to $9 million by November 2020, largely due to book sales and speaking fees after his vice presidency.

Political writer Howard Fineman wrote that "Biden is not an academic, he's not a theoretical thinker, he's a great street pol. He comes from a long line of working people in Scranton—auto salesmen, car dealers, people who know how to make a sale. He has that great Irish gift." In 2021, The Nation wrote that "Biden's attempt to identify with the working class has always been more aspiration than reality," and "he has long sought to appeal to the white working class, to position himself as part of it, even if this was as much a question of salesmanship and fantasy as anything else". Political columnist David S. Broder wrote that Biden has grown over time, saying "he responds to real people—that's been consistent throughout." Journalist James Traub wrote that "Biden is the kind of fundamentally happy person who can be as generous toward others as he is to himself."

After the 2015 death of his eldest son Beau, Biden was praised for his empathetic nature and ability to communicate about grief. CNN wrote in 2020 that his presidential campaign aimed to make him "healer-in-chief", while the New York Times described his extensive history of being called upon to give eulogies.

On July 2, 2010, Biden delivered a eulogy for West Virginia Senator Robert Byrd, for which he was criticized due to Byrd's prior association with the Ku Klux Klan. Biden has also been criticized for praising segregationist senators John Stennis, James Eastland, and Strom Thurmond.

A 2006 investigation by editors of the online encyclopedia Wikipedia found that Biden staffers had edited the site, removing and modifying descriptions of incidents of alleged plagiarism and recasting discussion of a possible Biden 2008 presidential candidacy in a more favorable light. In February 2006, The Washington Post quoted Biden spokesperson Norm Kurz as saying that the changes that were "made to Biden's site by this office were designed to make it more fair and accurate."

=== Political gaffes ===
In 2006, journalist and TV anchor Wolf Blitzer described Biden as loquacious. Jake Tapper said in 2007 that Biden sometimes "puts his foot in his mouth", and according to Ben Smith, writing for Politico in 2008, Biden often deviates from prepared remarks. In 2008, Mark Leibovich wrote for The New York Times that Biden's "weak filters make him capable of blurting out pretty much anything". In 2018, Biden called himself a "gaffe machine".

His gaffes are commonly called "Bidenisms". Some of them have been characterized as racially insensitive. In 2006, Biden stated to an Indian American voter that "In Delaware, the largest growth of population is Indian Americans, moving from India. You cannot go to a 7/11 or a Dunkin' Donuts unless you have a slight Indian accent." In 2020, he told Charlamagne tha God during an interview that "if you have a problem figuring out whether you're for me or Trump, then you ain't Black."

According to The New York Times, Biden often embellishes or exaggerates elements of his life, a trait also noted in 2014 by The New Yorker. In October 2022, the Washington Post wrote that Biden often stretches the truth in order to connect with the ethnicity or identity of his audience. Biden has claimed to have been more active in the civil rights movement than he actually was, and has falsely recalled being an excellent student who earned three college degrees. The Times wrote, "Biden's folksiness can veer into folklore, with dates that don't quite add up and details that are exaggerated or wrong, the factual edges shaved off to make them more powerful for audiences."

During and after the first debate of the 2024 presidential election, Biden came under immense scrutiny by both Democrats and Republicans for his repeated gaffes. CBS News reported during the debate that Biden was "struggling" with a "hoarse voice." Politico described Biden as "playing into Democrats' worst fears" and "while he wasn't speaking, he stood frozen behind his podium, mouth agape, his eyes wide and unblinking for long stretches of time." Early on the debate, Biden mistook million for billion and trillionaires for billionaires, stating, "We have a thousand trillionaires in America. I mean billionaires in America. And what’s happening? They’re in a situation where they in fact pay 8.2 percent in taxes. If they paid 24 percent, 25 percent, either one of those numbers, they’d raise $500 million—billion dollars, I should say—in a 10-year period." Later, after Biden gaffed "we finally beat Medicare," Trump mocked Biden by responding, "Well, he’s right: He did beat Medicare. He beat it to death." When bringing up the topic of abortion, widely considered one of the Democrat's "strongest lines of attack" against Trump, Biden attempted to remark on women being arrested for crossing state lines in search of abortion care especially in situations of rape and incest; however, these remarks were described in The Atlantic as "extremely hard to follow." Biden's poor performance in the debate led directly to his decision to withdraw from the presidential race.

=== In popular culture ===
==== The Onion parody of Biden ====
Between 2009 and 2019, satirical online newspaper The Onion consistently portrayed Biden as an outrageous character who shared almost nothing in common with his namesake besides the title of vice president of the United States. The character was also known as "Diamond Joe". The publication portrayed Biden as a blue-collar "average Joe", an affable "goofy uncle", a muscle car driver, an avid fan of 1980s hair metal, a raucous party animal, a shameless womanizer, a habitual petty criminal, and a drug-dealing outlaw. Biden's character became one of The Onion's most popular features during the Obama presidency, garnering critical acclaim and a large readership.

In 2019, Joe Garden, one of the contributors to the Onion's depiction of Biden, wrote an article in Vice Magazine expressing regret, and stating he "didn't take him seriously enough" and that The Onion "screwed up" and "let him off easy".

Despite the extreme differences between the fictional character and the real politician, The Onion was regarded as having a significant, mostly positive influence on Biden's public image. Commentators noted that the character likely reinforced public perceptions of Biden as a political figure with populist working-class appeal and a good-natured, easy-going disposition. After briefly reviving the "Diamond Joe" version of Biden in 2019 for its coverage of the Democratic primaries, The Onion retired the character and the Onion's depiction changed from "goofy", "fun", and "relatable", to "biting, sometimes vicious satirical critiques of the actual candidate", and "a creep".

==== Television ====
Nine people have portrayed Biden on Saturday Night Live starting with Kevin Nealon in 1991. Jason Sudeikis portrayed Biden during the 2008 United States Presidential election and has since returned to the role numerous times. During the 2020 United States Presidential election various performers played Biden including John Mulaney, Alex Moffat, Mikey Day, Woody Harrelson and Jim Carrey. In the Fall of 2024 Dana Carvey assumed the role for the 2024 United States presidential election.

In 2016, Greg Kinnear portrayed then Senator Biden in the HBO television film Confirmation about the controversial Clarence Thomas Supreme Court nomination hearings. Kerry Washington portrayed Anita Hill and Wendell Pierce played Clarence Thomas. Kinnear said he took the role because, "[Biden] is an interesting character, I understood his predicament, I understood the situation that he was in and I felt like that would be a great part to play." Brian Lowry of Variety described his performance as "uncanny". Emma Brockes of The Guardian described Kinnear as "particularly excellent". Joe McGovern of Entertainment Weekly cited his performance as being "fantastic", adding "Kinnear nails the duality of Biden’s position, attempting on one hand to maintain comity among his colleagues in the Senate while also trying, often fecklessly, to be sensitive to Hill".

== Approval rating ==
According to FiveThirtyEight, Biden's favorable approval rating remained higher than his disapproval rating until August 30, 2021. Since then, Biden's approval ratings have remained consistently below 45%, with his disapproval ratings being consistently above 50%.

Biden began his presidency with an approval rating above 53 percent, according to the same source, FiveThirtyEight, which takes an average of multiple individual polls. Biden's average disapproval rating rose to 57 percent by July 2022, before improving to the 51 to 52 percent mark by October 2022. Similarly, his approval rating dipped to 38 percent in July 2022, before recovering to the 42 to 43 percent mark by September 2022. His 2023 approval and disapproval ratings have remained flat on average around these percentage points (42 to 43 percent and 51 to 53 percent, respectively), which is comparable to former President Donald Trump at a similar stage in his presidency.

According to Gallup, Biden's approval fell to 37 percent in April and October 2023, the lowest in their polling surveys for Biden at the time. Gallup's poll for July 2024 put Biden's approval rating at 36 percent. In December 2023, Biden's approval fell to 33 percent in a Pew Research poll, the lowest since he took office. In February 2021, Gallup reported that 98 percent of Democrats approved of Biden; however, as of October 2023 that number had declined to 75 percent. Democrats' opinion of Biden's job has dropped by 11 percent during October 2023. According to Gallup, Biden has alienated some members of his own party with his swift and decisive show of support for Israel. Biden's approval rating among Republicans was 12 percent in February 2021, but ever since August 2021, that number has remained below 10 percent. In August 2023, a poll by the Associated Press and NORC Public Affairs Research Center found that three-quarters of people think Biden is too old for another term. By the end of 2023, Biden's approval rating was at 39 percent, which Gallup noted to be the lowest approval rating in modern history for a first-term president in the year preceding his re-election campaign.

According to Gallup, in July 2024, Biden's approval rating dropped to 36%, the lowest of his presidency, prior to his decision to end his re-election campaign; his highest approval rating dated back to 57% in April 2021. A poll of Americans on how history would view the Biden Presidency resulted in the percentage of Americans who believed his term in office would be viewed unfavorably as 54%, 17% rating his performance as poor and 37% as below average.

== Age and health concerns ==
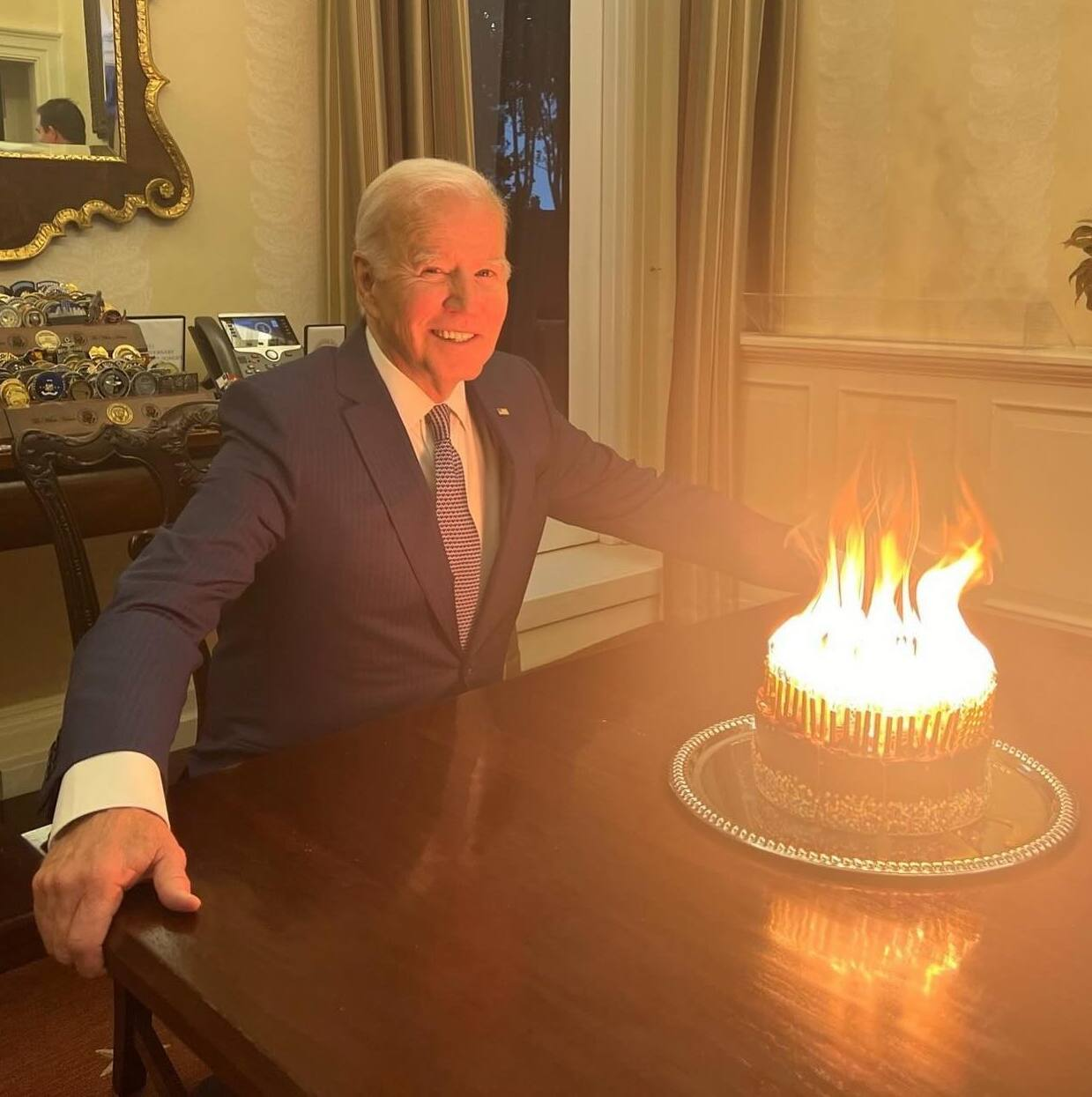
Biden on his 81st birthday (November 20, 2023)

Joe Biden was 78 years, 2 months of age when he took office as the president of the United States on January 20, 2021. At the time, he became both the oldest person to be inaugurated as U.S. president and the oldest sitting president in U.S. history. While Biden, a Democrat, campaigned for re-election in 2024, he suspended his campaign in July 2024 after being pressured to withdraw due to concerns about his age and mental acuity.

Before and during Biden's presidency, American voters and Biden's predecessor and successor as president, Donald Trump of the Republican Party, expressed concerns about Biden's health and fitness for office. These concerns led Dean Phillips, a member of the U.S. House of Representatives, to launch an unsuccessful Democratic primary challenge against Biden prior to the 2024 presidential election. In a February 2024 report by the U.S. Department of Justice, Robert Hur, a special counsel, opined that Biden's memory had "significant limitations"; the Biden administration dismissed the report as a "partisan hit job".

Concerns about Biden's age and health intensified following his faltering performance in the June 2024 presidential debate against Trump, leading many Democratic Party lawmakers to call for Biden to end his campaign. After initially stating that he would remain in the race, Biden ultimately withdrew on July 21, 2024; he immediately endorsed his vice president, Kamala Harris, to replace him as the party's presidential nominee. In the weeks and months following Biden's June 2024 debate against Trump, media outlets reported on efforts that had been made to manage and conceal Biden's age- and health-related limitations during his presidency. Harris went on to lose to Trump in the general election.

At the time his term as president ended on January 20, 2025, Biden was 82 years and 2 months old. He was diagnosed with prostate cancer in May 2025.

== See also ==
- Hunter Biden laptop controversy
- "Let's Go Brandon"
- Sleepy Joe (nickname)
