= Biden (disambiguation) =

Joe Biden (born 1942) served as the 46th president of the United States from 2021 to 2025.

Biden may also refer to:

== People with the surname ==
- Family of Joe Biden, for more on the family of the US president
  - Valerie Biden Owens (born 1945), political strategist and sister of President Joe Biden
  - James Biden (born 1949), healthcare executive brother of the president
  - Neilia Hunter Biden (1942–1972), teacher and first wife of the president
    - Beau Biden (1969–2015), Attorney General of Delaware, soldier, and son of President Joe Biden
    - Hunter Biden (born 1970), businessman and son of President Joe Biden
    - Kathleen Buhle, writer and former wife of Hunter Biden, known as Kathleen Biden during their marriage
  - Jill Biden (born 1951), educator and current wife of President Joe Biden
    - Ashley Biden (born 1981), social worker and daughter of President Joe Biden
- Christopher Biden (c. 1789–1858), British officer with the East India Company
- Preston Sturges (born Edmund Preston Biden; 1898–1959), American playwright and film director

== Other uses ==
- Bidens, a genus of flowering plant
- 2012 VP_{113}, a planetoid nicknamed "Biden"
- Joe Biden (The Onion), a fictionalized caricature of Biden from the satirical newspaper The Onion
- Biden Welcome Center, a rest stop in Delaware located on Interstate 95
- Joseph R. Biden, Jr. Railroad Station, an Amtrak station in Wilmington, Delaware
- Joseph R. Biden, Jr. School of Public Policy & Administration, a division of the University of Delaware focused on public policy
- Penn Biden Center for Diplomacy and Global Engagement, a division of the University of Pennsylvania focused on foreign policy
- "Biden", a 2020 song by Bo Burnham from the 2022 album The Inside Outtakes

== See also ==
- Bidin, surname
- Micael Bydén (born 1964), Supreme Commander of the Swedish Armed Forces
- Bident, a two-pronged tool similar to a pitchfork
- Bidan (disambiguation)
- Bidon (disambiguation)
- Boden (disambiguation)
