= Frank Bowden =

Frank Bowden may refer to:

- Sir Frank Bowden, 1st Baronet (1848–1921), founder of the Raleigh Bicycle Company
- Sir Frank Bowden, 3rd Baronet (1909–2001), of the Bowden baronets
- Frank Bowden (footballer) (1904–?), English footballer
- Frank Philip Bowden (1903–1968), Australian physicist
- Frank Bowden (tennis) (1908–1977), American tennis player
- Frank Prosser Bowden (1860–1934), public servant in Tasmania

== See also ==
- Bowden (disambiguation)
