= Stuff You Should Know =

American podcast and video series

- Genre: Society & Culture
- Language: English

Cast and voices
- Hosted by: Josh Clark; Charles W. (Wayne) "Chuck" Bryant

Production
- Length: 20–80 minutes

Technical specifications
- Audio format: Stereophonic/MP3

Publication
- No. of episodes: 2000+
- Original release: April 17, 2008
- Provider: iHeartRadio
- Updates: Quadweekly

Reception
- Ratings: 4.47/5

Related
- Website: www.stuffyoushouldknow.com www.iheart.com/podcast/105-stuff-you-should-know-26940277/

Stuff You Should Know, often abbreviated as SYSK, is a podcast and video series originally published by HowStuffWorks (and now by iHeartRadio) and hosted by Josh Clark and Charles W. "Chuck" Bryant. Launched in 2008, the informational podcast covers a wide variety of topics, often using popular culture as a reference.

From its launch in 2008 through 2026, the podcast consistently appeared in the Top 10 rankings on Apple Podcasts and Spotify, indicating that it's one of the most popular podcasts in the world. The podcast has been spun off into a variety of other media projects.

== Podcast ==
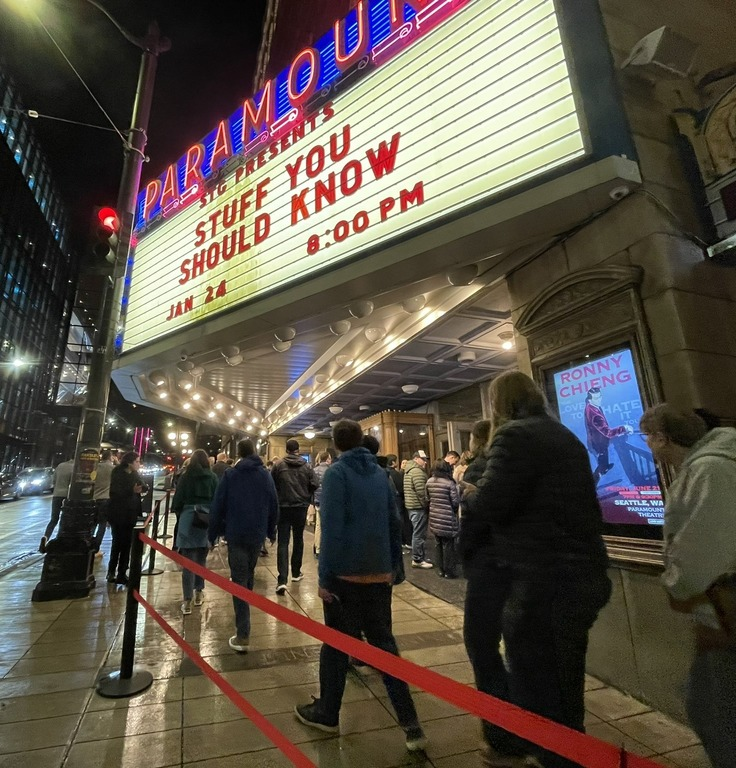
Attendees line up outside Paramount Theatre in Seattle in for a Stuff You Should Know live event in January 2024.

=== History ===
The podcast was launched on April 17, 2008, with Clark as the solo host. Bryant made his debut a month later on May 13, 2008. Bryant became the permanent cohost on July 15, 2008. The podcast, which was named by Clark, began as an attempt to re-purpose some of the written content on HowStuffWorks.com. Clark had never listened to a podcast before he recorded his first episode in 2008. Jesse Thorn has held the name up as a model of how a podcast should be named saying "it's like daring the listener not to listen to it."

The podcast has steadily grown in popularity since its introduction and has made appearances at events including South by Southwest and Comic-Con. On October 26, 2017, Stuff You Should Know released their 1000th episode. Several episodes have been recorded during live events, including two during their World Tour of Canada in September and October 2014. While in Canada they also participated in the Northwest Podcast Festival, at SXSW in 2011 and 2012, and New York Comic Con in 2012 where they recorded their discussion entitled "Time Travel: Science Fact or Science Fiction?"

During the 4th of July weekend in 2011, there was a Stuff You Should Know About America marathon on Sirius XM radio. It featured previous episodes, as well as a live segment with Wyatt Cenac and Hallie Haglund of The Daily Show as well as Joe Randazzo, Joe Garden and Jill Morris of The Onion. Their 420th episode was on medical marijuana, although this was reportedly a coincidence.

In 2011, the podcast added "Bonus Videos" to the podcast feed. These consist of humorous 60 second videos where Clark and Bryant converse about subjects they covered on previous podcasts while doing a variety of random activities (playing checkers, getting fitted for a suit, going to a doctor, driving through a car wash). As they speak, the scene changes repeatedly to something completely different, though their conversation continues uninterrupted as though nothing had happened. These clips have also aired during commercial slots on Science and appear on their YouTube channel.

There is one unaired episode on animal detectives that they hope will never be published. They have repeated a topic three times. They revisited the topic of Murphy's Law in 2011 after first doing it in 2008. As one of their first episodes, it was under 6 minutes in length. They also accidentally repeated a podcast on customs. The first time was in 2010 and the second was in 2016. In July 2018, they released an episode on recycling as an update on their first one, recorded over a decade ago.

On November 7, 2018, Josh Clark created a podcast called The End Of The World with Josh Clark, a 10-episode series that discusses what dangers lie in humanity's future. As of 2017, their office and studio was in the Ponce City Market in Atlanta. and their studio is slightly larger than a broom closet and features "kooky" items listeners have sent in, including wedding invitations and photoshopped movie posters with Clark and Bryant's faces on them. The office has a large mural depicting the formation of an idea, a research library, and giant question mark-shaped conference table.

=== Format ===
The podcast, which was the second on HowStuffWorks, has been described as the "heart and soul of the operation," with the "well researched" episodes cover a variety of topics from the fields of "science, history, urban legends, and pop culture, with the occasional conspiracy theory thrown in for good measure." Clark and Bryant have a conversation about the given topic such that, by the end, listeners have a "basic working knowledge of that subject." Clark has said they are on a "never ending quest to explain absolutely everything there is on planet earth and beyond."

Their "biggest hits" include episodes on Spam, hangovers, tipping in restaurants, cheese, Barbie, and pinball. The topics that get the greatest response from listeners include death and grieving, and episodes that received "less enthusiastic feedback" include shows on homelessness/addiction, Tourette's Syndrome, and transgender issues. Episodes are normally around 45 minutes in length, although for more in-depth topics the show occasionally runs long as an hour or more, with some being turned into two part episodes. Initial episodes were much shorter in duration, often less than 10 minutes.

According to Bryant, one of the reasons the hosts believe the show has been so successful is that they are "definitely not experts" in the myriad subjects they explore; they are instead "just guys who enjoy research and [are] very curious." Their formula "is part self-deprecating humor, part infectious wonder and part self-discipline to go their separate ways and do all their own research and reflection before they get to the studio." They often try to surprise one another with their research, and do not have a script or a time limit before they sit down to record. Likewise, they do not rehearse beforehand.

Most episodes end with listener mail, although there is an occasional segment known as "Administrative Details." Listener mail debuted on November 25, 2008, in the episode named "How Albert Einstein's Brain Worked". On that episode, they called it "Correction Time." The first time it was known as "Listener Mail" was on January 8, 2009, an episode that was inspired by a listener's email. During the Listener Mail portion of the podcast on April 11, 2013, a new jingle for the show was introduced. It was written and recorded by Rusty Matyas of Winnipeg, Manitoba in Canada, a musician and fan. Jon Biegen, another fan who covered Matyas' band, The Sheepdogs, has produced several new jingles for the show.

The show's regular producer is Jeri "Jerome" Rowland, who is assisted by a variety of regular guest producers, including Matt and Noel. Other staff includes Rebecca, the web producer, as well as Sherry and Joe. In 2017, there was a staff of 35.

== YouTube ==
Stuff You Should Know also has a YouTube channel, which is currently home to audio-only uploads of the podcast episodes. Formerly, it featured animated shorts, a This Day in History segment, and Josh Clark's series Don't Be Dumb. In addition, the pair also offered live shorts and movie reviews.

In Don't Be Dumb, Clark explained a topic while wearing a tweed jacket and bow tie. His posture, gestures, and stilted language were intentionally uncomfortable and awkward.

In another video segment, Internet Roundup, Chuck and Josh highlighted a couple of posts found deep in the web that they found interesting, entreating or amusing. In 2009, Clark and Bryant began a "short lived" webcast.

== TV show ==
A full-length Stuff You Should Know TV show premiered on January 19, 2013, on the Science Channel, which was owned by Discovery Network, the then-parent company of HowStuffWorks. The show included a pilot and 10 episodes each 30 minutes in length. The series was produced by production company School of Humans.

Described as the "love child of the British version of The Office and an overheard conversation about science between two reasonably informed guys," the show was about a real podcast that is set in a fictional world. Each episode followed Josh and Chuck inside and outside the recording booth, combining the factual information of their podcast with humorous, fictional story lines that align with each podcast topic.

The show had "the attention span of a teenaged boy" and "bounces from scene to scene without explanation or sense." Focus groups at the 2012 South by Southwest screened episodes and provided feedback for the development of the show, and its pacing in particular.

The lead actress on the show was Caitlin Bitzegaio of the Upright Citizens Brigade Theatre. The shows were directed by L.C. Crowley with a theme song and score composed by The Henry Clay People, the "unofficial house band" of Stuff You Should Know. Guests on the show included John Hodgman, Sarah Silverman, Neil deGrasse Tyson, Rufus Wainwright, and Michio Kaku.

The show was canceled after the first season "due to poor ratings", although each episode is made available for purchase on iTunes and Google Play. It was the most expensive pilot episode ever produced by the Discovery Channel.

== Outside activities ==
Previously, as with the other podcasts offered by HowStuffWorks, Stuff You Should Know had its own blog updated daily by its hosts and often featuring the same type of material found in the podcasts, often with show follow-ups.

Clark and Bryant were the co-hosts for the Science of Cyborgs event hosted by the Science & Entertainment Exchange.

There is a X/Twitter account, an Instagram account, and a Facebook page for SYSK, as well as a now official Facebook group for the SYSK Army, which was created by four listeners on January 30, 2011 (and became official when linked to the SYSK Facebook page on May 10, 2017). The group continues to be run by three of the original four creators, as well as other listeners in administrator and moderator roles. There is no involvement by the hosts of the show, but they have frequently mentioned the group and the SYSK Army on podcast episodes.

=== Microlending ===
Starting in 2009, after doing an episode on how microlending works, the show began encouraging listeners to make loans on the online microlending site Kiva. A Stuff You Should Know team had raised $150,000 by the middle of 2010, and more than $2.75 million by November 2014. In 2009 they challenged Stephen Colbert to see whose team could raise $100,000 first and they "beat the pants off of" him, reaching that goal in three months.

The lending team is now run by fan volunteers, has since consistently ranked among the top five teams in terms of both donations and users. As of November 2014 the team ranked #7 for new users among new Kiva users, and in the "Friends" category of teams, ranked #2 for new users and amount loaned.

=== Books ===
Clark and Bryant also present two longer and more in-depth audio programs featuring interviews and portions recorded on location available for purchase as audiobooks, which are entitled The Super Stuffed Guide to the Economy and The Super Stuffed Guide to Happiness.

The two podcast hosts have also written a book with Nils Parker entitled Stuff You Should Know: An Incomplete Compendium of Mostly Interesting Things. The book was published in November 2020 and covers a wide range of topics including history, psychology, pop culture, and science. They later published a kids edition.

=== Cooperative for Education ===
In February 2010, Clark, Bryant, and Rowland traveled to Guatemala to promote Cooperative for Education, an organization which gives textbooks to schools in Guatemala to be rented by students for a small fee that is then deposited into an account that will be used to replace old textbooks in the future. They produced a pair of podcasts on the topic.

=== Trivial Pursuit ===
On July 7, 2021, Hasbro released a special edition of Trivial Pursuit: The Stuff You Should Know Edition. The game is based on episodes from the podcast and contains categories of History, Pop Culture, Myths, Legends, & Conspiracies, Science & Tech, Humans, and SYSK Selects. These topics were chosen by hosts Josh and Chuck. Designed for 3 to 6 players, ages 16 and older, the game includes 600 questions with answers from various SYSK episodes. The game offers those stuck on questions various lifeline help, such as "Stuff You Should Skip". The first player to gain each one of the 6 category tokens wins.

== Reception ==
The show is downloaded more than 1 million times per week and is consistently on the iTunes Top 10 podcast rankings, peaking at #1. It is "one of the most downloaded podcasts on the planet." The show won the 2014 People's Voice Webby Award in the Mobile – Podcast division. and a place in Podcast Awards's Education category. At live events the demographics of the audiences are "all over the map. There are some geeks here and there, but also super cool people, and families and kids, and old people."

Entertainment Weekly chose the TV show in early February 2013 as #7 for their "The Must List: The Top 10 Things We Love This Week," writing, "Whether you're curious about bee colonies or weather control, Josh Clark and Chuck Bryant have the scoop." The podcast has been said to cover "a truly staggering range of topics."

Clark and Bryant have been described as "hosts so lovely you may just fall in love with them," and provide the show with "an everyman, conversational feel to the show — two pals sitting back and picking apart one topic after another." Several couples have been brought together because of their mutual fondness for the podcast, and one even had a Stuff You Should Know-themed wedding.

They receive over 350 pieces of fan mail a week. After two months, their Facebook page had over 10,000 likes, and as of September 2015 it had more than 750,000. One reviewer said of it: "It is never not fun to listen to."

Stuff You Should Know's "beautifully, beautifully done" production has set "the audio standard," according to podcast reviewers Pod on Pod. They added that the audio quality "could not be improved" on the NPR-level production.

The podcast won the 2016 Webby Award for "People's Voice". The podcast was the "People's Voice Winner" at the 2017 Webby Awards as well as an Honoree for "Best Host".

=== Awards ===
| Award | Date | Category | Result | Ref. |
|---|---|---|---|---|
| Webby Awards | 2011 | Best Web Personality or Host | Won | |
| Webby Awards | 2012 | Best Web Personality or Host | Won | |
| Webby Awards | 2012 | Radio & Podcasts | Won | |
| Webby Awards | 2014 | People's Voice Winner | Won | |
| Webby Awards | 2015 | Apps and Software - Podcasts | Won | |
| Webby Awards | 2015 | People's Voice Winner | Won | |
| Webby Awards | 2016 | People's Voice Winner | Won | |
| Webby Awards | 2017 | People's Voice Winner - Arts & Culture | Won | |
| Webby Awards | 2017 | Best Host | Won | |
| Podcast Awards | 2010 | Education | | |
| iHeart Radio Podcast Awards | 2019 | Podcast of the Year | Nominated | |
| iHeart Radio Podcast Awards | 2019 | Best Curiosity Podcast | Won | |
| iHeart Radio Podcast Awards | 2019 | Most Bingeable Podcast | Nominated | |
| iHeart Radio Podcast Awards | 2020 | Best Podcast of the Year | Nominated | |
| iHeart Radio Podcast Awards | 2022 | Podcast of the Year (Socially Voted Category) | Nominated | |
| Academy of Podcasters | 2015 | Ideas & Education | Finalist | |
| Academy of Podcasters | 2017 | Society & Culture | Won | |
| Adweek Podcast Awards | 2019 | Podcast Event of the Year | Won | |
