= Bowdon =

Bowdon may refer to:

== Places ==
- Bowdon, Georgia, a city in Carroll County
  - Bowdon High School, in the city of Bowdon, Georgia
  - Bowdon Railway, which formerly connected Bowdon and Bowdon Junction
- Bowdon Junction, Georgia, an unincorporated community in Carroll County
- Bowdon, North Dakota, a city in Wells County
- Bowdon, Greater Manchester
  - Bowdon Cricket Club, Greater Manchester
  - Bowdon Hockey Club, Greater Manchester
  - Bowdon railway station, Greater Manchester
- Bowdon Urban District, a former administrative area in Cheshire
- Bowdon (ward), an electoral district in Greater Manchester

== People ==
- Bob Bowdon (born before 1998), American broadcast journalist and executive
- Dorris Bowdon (1914-2005), American actress
- Franklin Welsh Bowdon (1817-1857), U.S. Representative from Alabama
- Tom Butler-Bowdon (born 1967), Australian motivational writer based in England
- W. George Bowdon Jr. (1921-2005), U.S. politician in Louisiana

== See also ==
- Bowden (disambiguation)
