= Uncle Joe =

Uncle Joe may refer to:

== People ==
- Joseph Stalin (1878–1953), Soviet leader, called "Uncle Joe" by Western media
- Joe Biden (born 1942), 46th president of the United States, sometimes nicknamed "Uncle Joe" in the press
- Joseph Gurney Cannon (1836–1926), United States politician
- Joseph E. Johnston (1807–1891), Confederate general during the American Civil War
- Joseph Ligambi (born 1939), American mobster and former boss of the Philadelphia crime family
- Joe McGinness (1914–2003), Australian Aboriginal rights activist
- Joshua Mills (1859–1943), Australian MP
- Joe Vlasits (1921–1985), Hungarian football player and manager

== Characters ==
- Uncle Joe (Petticoat Junction character), Joe Carson, a character from Petticoat Junction and related series
- Uncle Joe Shannon, the eponymous character of the movie Uncle Joe Shannon
- Joe Biden (The Onion), the portrayal of Joe Biden in the newspaper The Onion, sometimes known as "Uncle Joe"

== Other uses ==
- Uncle Joe (film), a 1941 American film directed by Howard M. Railsback and Raymond E. Swartley
- Uncle Joe's Mint Balls, traditional mints produced by Wm Santus & Co

== See also ==
- Tío Pepe
