= Bidon =

Bidon may refer to:

== People ==
- Louis Joseph Victor Jullien de Bidon (1764–1839), French officer and nobleman
- Luis Cernuda Bidon (1902–1963), Spanish poet and member of the Generation of '27
- Pierrot Bidon (1954–2010), French circus promoter
- Sergey Bida (nicknamed Bidon; born 1993), Russian Olympic medalist épée fencer
- Breno Bidon, Brazilian footballer

== Places ==
- Bidon, Ardèche, Auvergne-Rhône-Alpes, France
- Bidon 5, also known as Poste Maurice Cortier, Algeria

== Other ==
- Bidon, a 1976 album by Alain Souchon
- Bidon, a cycling term for a water bottle

== See also ==
- Bidan (disambiguation)
- Biden (disambiguation)
- Bidin, a surname
