= Bidin =

Bidin is a surname. Notable people with the name include:

- Abdulwahid Bidin (1925–1999), Filipino lawyer
- Aznil Bidin (born 1994), Malaysian weightlifter

== See also ==
- Bidan (disambiguation)
- Biden (disambiguation) § People with the surname
- Bidon (disambiguation)
