= Bowden =

Bowden may refer to:

== Places ==
=== Australia ===
- Bowden Island, one of the Family Islands in Queensland
- Bowden, South Australia, northwestern suburb of Adelaide
  - Bowden railway station

=== Canada ===
- Bowden, Alberta, town in central Alberta

=== England ===
- Bowden, Ashprington, a historic estate in Devon
- Bowden, Yealmpton, a hamlet in Devon
- Bowden Hill, village in Wiltshire
- Great Bowden, village in Leicestershire
- Little Bowden, formerly a village in Northamptonshire, now part of Market Harborough in Leicestershire
- Bowdon, Greater Manchester, a suburb and electoral ward in the Metropolitan Borough of Trafford, Greater Manchester

=== Scotland ===
- Bowden, Scottish Borders, village in Roxburghshire

=== United States ===
- Bowden, West Virginia
- Bowden, Oklahoma

== People ==
- Bowden (surname)

== Other ==
- Bowden Lithia water, a lithia water brand marketed by Judge Bowden in 1887
- Wilson Bowden, construction company
- Bowden cable

== See also ==
- Boden (disambiguation)
- Bowdon (disambiguation)
- Bowen (disambiguation)
