= Boden =

Boden may refer to:

== Places ==
- Boden Block, in Nuapada District, Odisha, India
- Boden Municipality, in Sweden
- Boden, Sweden, a city and the seat of Boden Municipality
- Boden, Germany, a municipality in the district Westerwaldkreis, in Rhineland-Palatinate, Germany
- Boden, Illinois, an unincorporated community
- Boden, Ohio, an unincorporated community

== Other uses ==
- Boden (surname)
- Boden (clothing), a clothing retailer
- Boden Scholarship, established in 1833 at the University of Oxford for students learning Sanskrit
- Norrland Engineer Battalion (Boden Engineer Regiment), a Swedish Army unit from 1905 to 2005

== See also ==
- Lake Constance (Bodensee in German)
- Boden's Mate, a mating pattern in chess, discovered by Samuel Boden
- Bodden (disambiguation)
- Bodin (surname)
