= Bidan, Baft =

Bidan بيدان
- Village
- Location within Iran
- Coordinates: 29°18′15″N 56°41′05″E
- Country: Iran
- Province: Kerman
- County: Baft
- Bakhsh: Central
- Rural District: Bezenjan

Population (2006)
  - Total: 139
- Time zone: UTC+3:30 (IRST)
  - Summer (DST): UTC+4:30 (IRDT)

Bidan (Persian: بيدان, also Romanized as Bīdān) is a village in Bezenjan Rural District, in the Central District of Baft County, Kerman Province, Iran. At the 2006 census, its population was 139, in 24 families.
