= Bob Bowdon =

American broadcast journalist

- Education: Purdue University (BS); Stanford University (MS)
- Occupations: Journalist, director, producer

Bob Bowdon is an American longtime broadcast journalist who is the executive director of ChoiceMedia.TV, an investigative video website devoted to education reform. He is a champion of school choice, charter schools, vouchers, merit pay, and other types of education reform.

== Early life and education ==
He holds a B.S. in mechanical engineering from Purdue University and an M.S. in industrial engineering from Stanford University.

== Career ==
Early in his career he worked as an account executive and technical specialist for AT&T Computer Systems, for which he served on the national account team for American Express, AT&T's second largest corporate customer.

He worked as a location scout and location assistant for the feature film Hangin' with the Homeboys, produced by New Line Cinema and filmed in New York City.

He was associate producer of New York at Night, starring Clint Holmes, on New York's WWOR-TV.

He was a segment producer for The Jackie Mason Show on WWOR-TV in New York, booking and producing segments involving newsmakers, journalists, comedians and performers.

Early in his career, Bowdon worked as host or co-host of Final Edition on the NewsTalk Television Cable Network. This was a 2-hour news program on which he appeared live with Phil Donahue, Vladimir Pozner, Ernie Anastos, Steve Adubato, Denise Richardson, and Jerry Brown.

He was lead news anchor for the 5pm and 10pm weekday news broadcasts on a TV channel in the Tri-state area.

He served as host of Cafe Digital, a nationally syndicated half-hour program on technology and culture that appeared on the Technology Communications Network from September 1998 to March 2000. It was carried weekly in more than 70 cities.

He served as an anchorman and reporter on Bloomberg Television from March 2000 to July 2006. During his tenure, he served as lead market close reporter and afternoon stocks editor for Bloomberg Television's World Financial Report.

Since 2006, Bowdon has appeared regularly as reporter “Brian Scott” in parody news reports for The Onion News Network. These reports have been shown on the IFC cable channel.

== The Cartel ==
Bowdon directed The Cartel, a 2009 documentary film about corruption in American public education that was distributed by Warner Brothers. The film views the current state of public schools in the U.S. as a “national disaster for the workforce of the future.” Bowdon notes that the U.S., by many measures, “spends more on education than any country in the world,” and chooses to concentrate principally on his own state, New Jersey, which spends more per student on public education than any other state, but where average standardized-test scores in public schools are very low. In an effort to explain where all the money allocated to public education is going, Bowdon portrays a union-dominated institutional culture in which bureaucracies are overstaffed by highly paid administrators, expenditures on school-construction projects are unsupervised and out of control, corruption and patronage are rampant, incompetent teachers cannot be fired, and excellent teachers cannot be rewarded. As a solution to the problem, Bowdon proposes school choice and charter schools.

New Jersey Governor Chris Christie, who watched The Cartel twice, has praised it as an influence on his own ideas about school reform.

== ChoiceMedia.TV ==
ChoiceMedia.TV went online in September 2011. In an interview with Nick Gillespie of Reason, Bowdon described it as “an education-reform news service” that would produce “investigative news pieces…about waste, fraud, abuse, and corruption in... public schools,” report on “school turnaround stories,” and provide other types of coverschools, while highlighting successes where they occur and pointing the way to a more hopeful tomorrow.”age related to school reform. In another interview he described ChoiceMedia.TV as an “education reform home page.” At the website itself, its mission is described as being “to expose America's high-cost, low-performing schools"

== Writing ==
Bowdon stated in an October 2010 article that “for the last generation, in city after city, a combination punch of emotional appeal and fiscal irresponsibility have produced endless increases in public school spending” premised on the notion that “spending = quality.”

Bowdon argued in an October 2010 article that the “many cases of abject educational dysfunction” are “rarely acknowledged by the 'throw more money at the problem' crowd,” who “respond to calls for reform” with “expositions on the great 'concerns' posed by any particular reform. (To the establishment, even the worst failing schools never foster the same level of concern as the mildest of reforms.)”

In a November 2010 article, Bowdon criticized supporters of the educational status quo who dismiss reformers' ideas as “simplistic.”

Bowdon discussed in a December 2010 interview on WPIX-TV the naming of a new New York City schools chancellor, Kathy Black, who he expected and hoped would expand school-choice options in the city.

Bowdon noted in a January 2011 article that support for educational reform had advanced considerably in 2010.

In a February 2011 article, Bowdon criticized a Google art project for children, “Doodle-4-Google,” which required that parents provide the company with their children's birthdates and places of birth and the last four digits of their social-security numbers. Noting that “what Google knows and many parents don't know is that a person's city of birth and year of birth can be used to make a statistical guess about the first five digits of his/her social security number,” he pointed out that “a national, commercial database of names and addresses of American children, especially one that includes their dates of birth and SSNs, would be worth many millions to marketing firms and retailers.”

Writing in March 2011, Bowdon accused a New Jersey judge of judicial overreach for claiming the right to pronounce on educational appropriations in the state budget.

Borrowing the arguments made by teachers' unions in opposition to grading of teacher performance, Bowdon argued, in a tongue-in-cheek May 2011 article, that by the same logic students' performance should not be graded either.

Bowdon noted in a September 2011 article that while the National Education Association claimed to have embraced the idea of evaluating teachers on the basis of student performance on standardized tests, the NEA had in fact not abandoned its opposition to such evaluation. In other words: “While they claim to support the principle of teacher accountability, they oppose any particular accountability plan if it contains the inherent design flaw of actually doing anything.” He warned readers not to heed “the words of the teachers unions” but rather to “Watch what they do.”

== Other professional activities ==
Bowdon has appeared on many major media to discuss school reform. He has received attention and support from such figures as John Stossel, Joe Scarborough, and Reason's Nick Gillespie.

He noted in an interview that the dropout rates in New York, Los Angeles, and many other American major cities are over 50%, much higher than comparable cities around the world, even though education expenses are higher in the U.S. than elsewhere.

In April 2010, Bowdon discussed school choice on Morning Joe, calling the present system, under which “you can never fire a bad teacher,” “preposterous.” He noted that despite high allocations to education in places like New Jersey, “very little reaches the teachers' salaries.”

Appearing on Fox Business News in February 2011, Bowdon complained about teachers in Madison, Wisconsin, who had compelled their pupils to take part in pro-teachers' union demonstrations without explaining these events to the children. The latter, Bowdon charged, were being used as “pawns.”

In a 2012 interview, Bowdon noted that black students born in Africa were academically outperforming their American-born black classmates in Seattle schools. “It's not about race, it's about culture,” he said. He also talked about how the New York City Teachers' Union and NAACP had sued to remove charter schools from school buildings in that city. “Why,” he asked, “is the NAACP... opposing these schools who are almost doing nothing but helping black kids?” The charter schools won the lawsuit, but another lawsuit was filed a week later.

In a September 2012 presentation, Bowdon “presented public K-12 education in America as plagued by bureaucracy, union hegemony, and lack of accountability, but also offered several ways that citizen watchdogs can cut through the waste and improve efficiency in their local school districts.” He also charged that teachers' unions are frighteningly powerful, limiting parents' ability to make decisions about their children's schooling. He encouraged parents to attend school-board meetings and asked informed questions about such matters as “how much of the equipment it bought last year is still in use, and how much has been thrown away” and “what companies are being hired to work on the school’s facilities.”

On the Fox Business channel in March 2013, Bowdon and Newark Teachers Union president Joe Del Grosso debated the subject of school choice. Del Grosso opposed for-profit education, saying that “public education is the last bastion of democracy” and lamenting that “[Bowdon] and I talk at each other when really we should be speaking together” about how to make existing schools work. Del Grosso admitted that he had no idea where Newark's huge education budget was going.

== Honors and awards ==
While working at AT&T, he was selected for participation in the AT&T Achiever's Club national event and won an Outstanding Performer award.

The Cartel won twelve film festival awards, including the Audience Award and Visionary Award at the 2010 Washington, D.C., Independent Film Festival, the Best Documentary award and the Pacific Research Institute Prize for Excellence in Filmmaking, at the 2011 inaugural Anthem Film Festival, and the Audience Award at the 2009 Hoboken International Film Festival.
