= Bidan, Zarand =

Bidan بيدان
- Village
- Location within Iran
- Coordinates: 30°56′07″N 56°44′53″E
- Country: Iran
- Province: Kerman
- County: Zarand
- Bakhsh: Central
- Rural District: Sarbanan

Population (2006)
  - Total: 24
- Time zone: UTC+3:30 (IRST)
  - Summer (DST): UTC+4:30 (IRDT)

Bidan (Persian: بيدان, also Romanized as Bīdān; also known as Bābbīdān and Bīdūn) is a village in Sarbanan Rural District, in the Central District of Zarand County, Kerman Province, Iran. At the 2006 census, its population was 24, in 6 families.
