= Bidan Island =

Island in Malaysia

Native name: Pulau Bidan
- Interactive map of Bidan Island

Geography
- Location: Strait of Malacca
- Coordinates: 5°45′N 100°17′E
- Area: 0.33 km^{2} (0.13 sq mi)

Administration
- Malaysia
- State: Kedah
- District: Yan
- Mukim: Yan

Bidan Island (Malay: Pulau Bidan) is a small island off the coast of Yan, Kedah, Malaysia. Located 17 nautical miles north from Penang, the island was used by Australian Defence force personnel and families from Butterworth/Penang as a holiday retreat for a week or two in the 1970s and 1980s, with little to no contact with the outside world, except by two-way radio. Access was generally via boat from Penang Island.

Telor and Song Song islands, to the north of Bidan Island, were also used by the Royal Australian Air Force as air weapons range or target practice range by the Australian fighter aircraft squadrons stationed at Butterworth Air Base circa 1980s.
