= Boden, Ohio =

Unincorporated community in Ohio, U.S.

Coordinates: 40°06′54″N 81°42′08″W

Boden is an unincorporated community in Guernsey County, in the U.S. state of Ohio.

== History ==
A post office was established at Boden in 1889, and remained in operation until it was discontinued in 1901. The community was named after William E. Boden, a state legislator.
