= Bidan, Bushehr =

Bidan بيدان
- Village
- Country: Iran
- Province: Bushehr
- County: Jam
- Bakhsh: Central
- Rural District: Jam

Population (2006)
  - Total: 25
- Time zone: UTC+3:30 (IRST)

Bidan (Persian: بيدان, also Romanized as Bīdān) is a village in Jam Rural District, in the Central District of Jam County, Bushehr Province, Iran. At the 2006 census, its population was 25, in 6 families.
