= Joe Biden (The Onion) =

Fictional parody character from The Onion

- Manipulated photo of Biden in The Onion (2009)
- First appearance: "Shirtless Biden Washes Trans Am in White House Driveway"; May 5, 2009
- Last appearance: "Biden Pulls Off Dusty Tarp Covering Old Campaign Motorcycle"; March 20, 2019
- Created by: Chad Nackers
- Based on: Joe Biden

In-universe information
- Nicknames: "Diamond Joe"; "Uncle Joe"; "The President of Vice"

Joe Biden (also known as "Diamond Joe" or "Uncle Joe") was a recurring fictionalized characterization of American politician Joe Biden in satirical online newspaper The Onion. Between 2009 and 2019, The Onion staff portrayed Biden as a blue-collar "average Joe", an affable "goofy uncle", a muscle car driver, an avid fan of 1980s hair metal, a raucous party animal, a shameless womanizer, a recidivist petty criminal, and a drug-dealing outlaw. The Biden character became one of The Onion's most popular features during the Obama presidency, garnering critical acclaim and a large readership.

Onion writer-editor Chad Nackers originated the newspaper's distinctive version of Biden, which its staff developed over the course of the real Biden's two terms as vice president. Nackers took inspiration from his upbringing in Midwestern Wisconsin and, more loosely, from aspects of Biden's personality and public face. Although The Onion had mentioned Biden's name as early as 2006, he was not treated as the primary subject of an item in the newspaper until Obama's (and his) first inauguration in January 2009. The first full-length treatment of the Biden character was a May 2009 article titled "Shirtless Biden Washes Trans Am in White House Driveway". The character subsequently appeared in more than 50 Onion articles, as well as numerous videos and other media.

Despite the extreme differences between the fictional character and the real politician, The Onion was regarded as having a significant, mostly positive influence on Biden's public image. Commentators noted that the character likely reinforced public perceptions of Biden as a political figure with populist working-class appeal and a good-natured, easy-going disposition. The real Biden made several public comments noting his enjoyment of his characterization in The Onion. In 2016, Mitch McConnell referenced the character on the Senate floor in a speech tributing the departing vice president amid the presidential transition of Donald Trump.

Early reception for the character was generally enthusiastic. As the 2020 Democratic primaries and Biden's 2020 presidential campaign got underway, The Onion attracted criticism for the character's detachment from reality and its distraction from the real Biden. Former Onion editor Joe Garden wrote a self-critical op-ed on the subject in May 2019. While Garden still felt the caricature had been funny, he expressed regret that it had failed to provide more meaningful commentary on the politician's record and what Garden found to be substantive shortcomings. After reviving the "Diamond Joe" version of Biden in its coverage of the primaries for one final article, The Onion retired the character. Since mid-2019, the publication's parodies of Biden have drawn more closely from real-world developments.

== Background ==
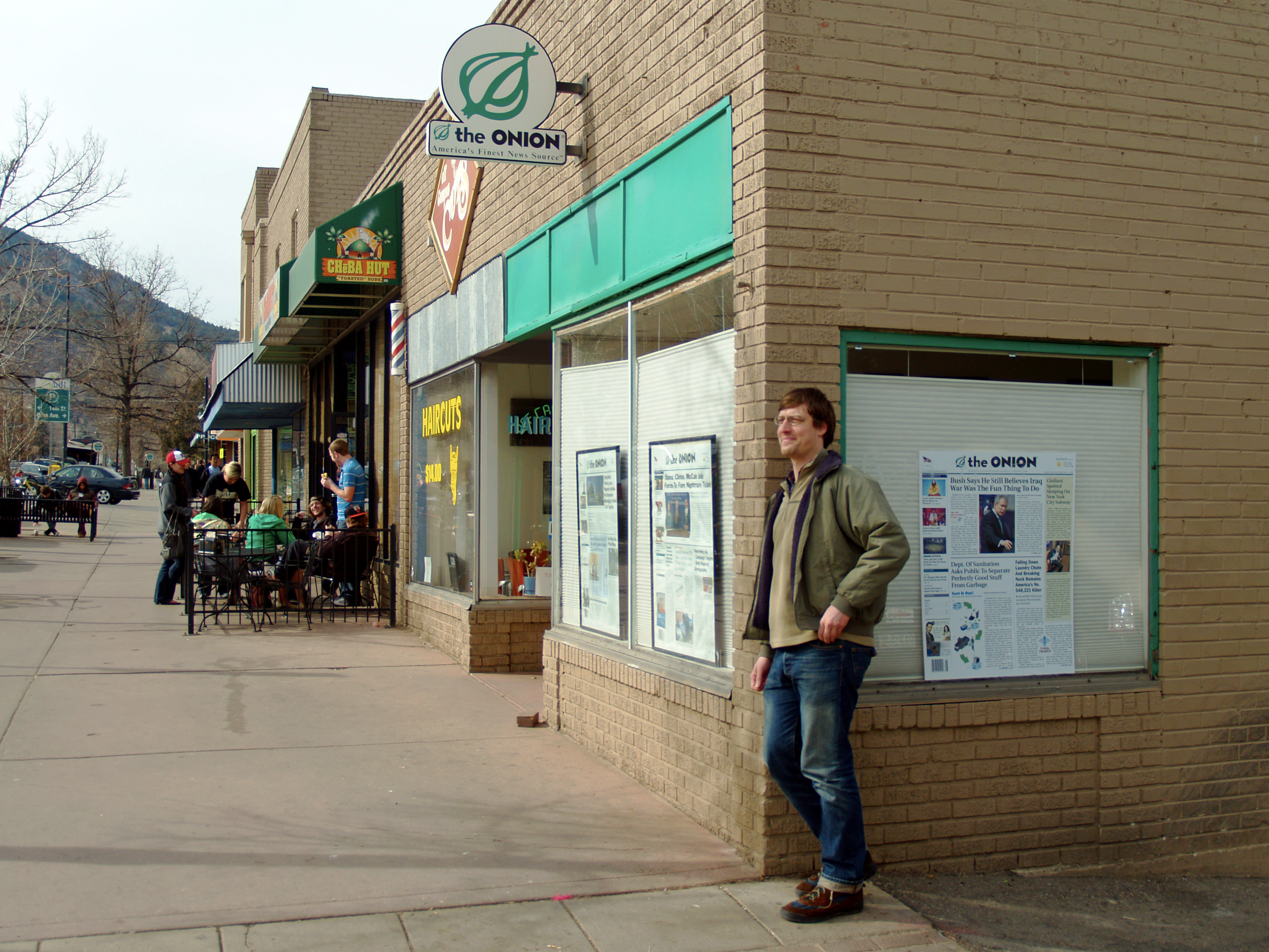
The Onion's then-office in Boulder, Colorado, in 2009

Joe Biden is an American retired politician. A member of the Democratic Party, Biden represented Delaware in the U.S. Senate from 1973 to 2009. As the running mate of Barack Obama, Biden was elected vice president of the United States in 2008 and 2012. In his third presidential campaign—following previous efforts in 1988 and 2008—he was elected President of the United States in 2020. He served as the 46th president of the United States from 2021 to 2025.

The Onion is an American publication that parodies traditional newspapers and satirizes current events. Founded in 1988 in Madison, Wisconsin as a weekly satirical print newspaper, it began publishing online in 1996 and discontinued its print edition in 2013. Articles in The Onion often lampoon real-world public figures and events using fictitious elements. The Onion had a few noteworthy instances of consistent characterizations over time prior to Biden, such as portrayals of Bill Clinton and Bob Dole in the 1990s.

Chad Nackers, the writer who created the Biden character, joined The Onion in 1997. By 2017, he had been on staff longer than anyone else in the paper's history.

== Origin and development ==
Prior to becoming vice president in 2009, Biden was not heavily featured in The Onion. His few early appearances did not reflect the distinctive traits of the later character. The earliest mention of Biden was published in August 2006, during the early period of the 2008 Democratic Party presidential primaries. With the headline "Critics Accuse Joe Biden of Running for President for Political Reasons", the article was based on a nonspecific premise that did not rely on any aspect of the real Biden's personality or career and, in principle, could have been written using any candidate as its subject.

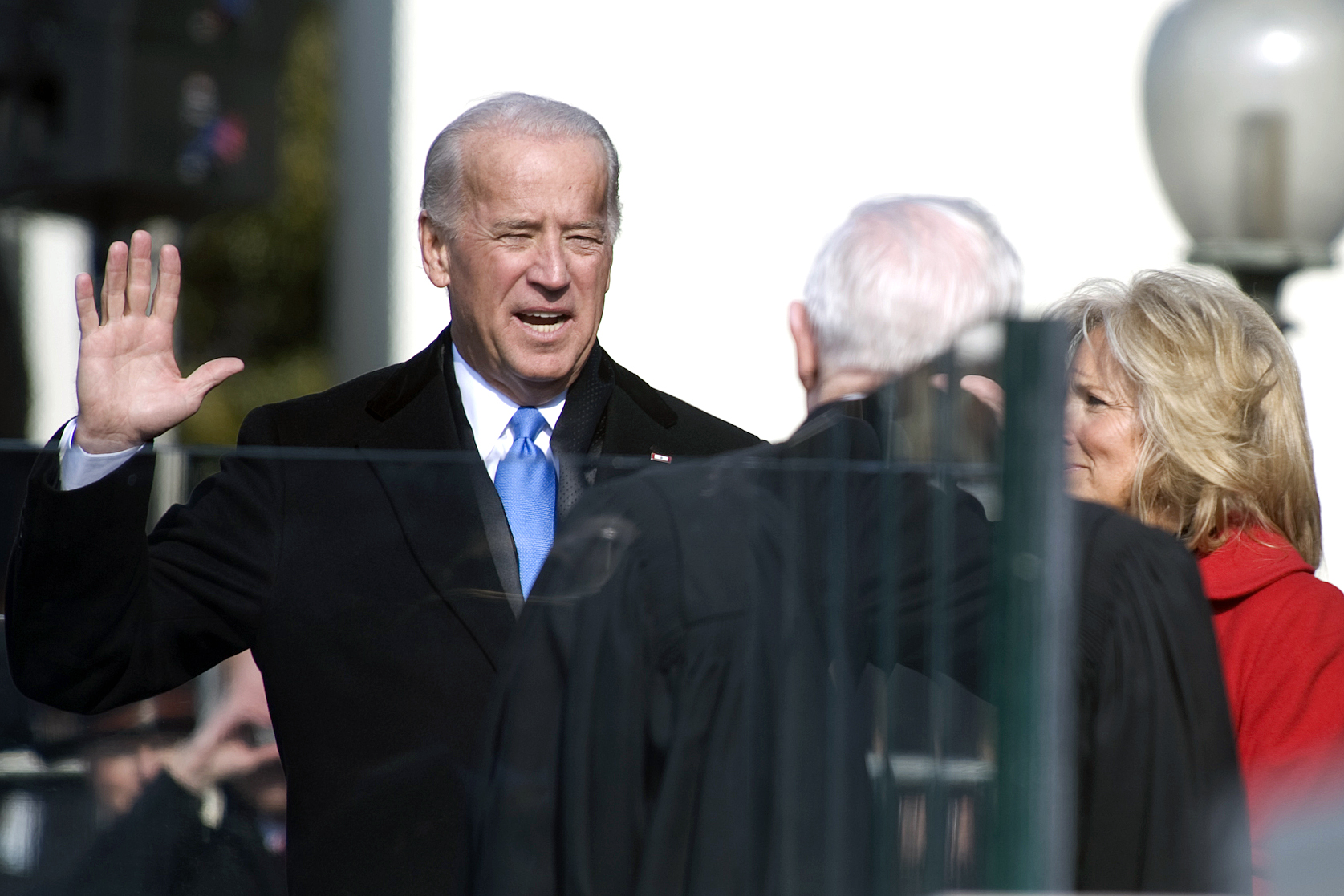
Biden rarely appeared in The Onion until the first inauguration of Barack Obama on January 20, 2009. On that day, the newspaper published the headline "Joe Biden Shows Up to Inauguration With Ponytail".

Even after Biden was selected as Obama's running mate, he was only occasionally mentioned in The Onion. However, Nackers said that the candidate's public appearances as Obama's running mate—especially, in Nackers's words, the "shit-eating grin he had" at those appearances—began to provide a "spark" of inspiration for the character. Nackers felt that Biden's easygoing persona struck a dramatic contrast with the more intense, sinister public perception of his predecessor Dick Cheney. Asked about the genesis of the character, The Onion's founding editor Scott Dikkers said Biden had "this great inappropriate, older buddy wild child kind of vibe." Nackers also drew inspiration from his own "strong connection to blue-collar life" and upbringing in Appleton, Wisconsin. When writing Biden articles, Nackers would play music by bands like Mötley Crüe and White Lion to evoke memories and details that could inform the character—a technique The Washington Post compared to method acting.

The first appearance of the Biden character coincided with the first inauguration of Barack Obama on January 20, 2009, when The Onion ran the headline "Joe Biden Shows Up to Inauguration With Ponytail" paired with a manipulated image of Biden sporting a long blond ponytail, without an accompanying article. The full-fledged character debuted on May 5, 2009, in the article "Shirtless Biden Washes Trans Am in White House Driveway".

During Biden's first year in office, The Onion published a few articles that depicted him as a more traditional vice president, including a spoof on the National Thanksgiving Turkey Presentation (titled "Biden Pardons Single Yam in Vice-Presidential Thanksgiving Ritual"), but by 2010 the writing staff had settled on exclusively using Nackers's "virtually unrecognizable" take on the character. Soon, the newspaper's editors had so many jokes based on the character that there was a backlog of rejected pitches.

== Characterization ==
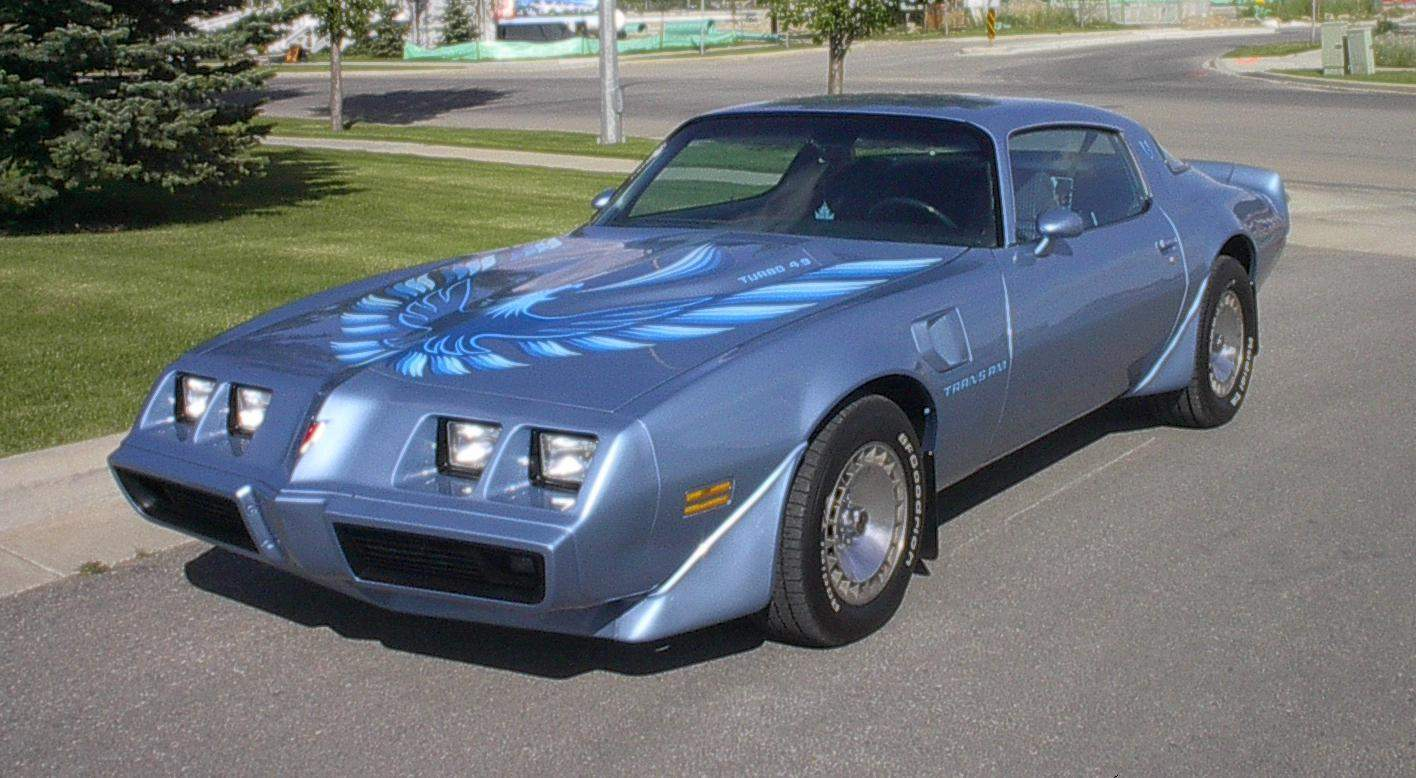
"Diamond Joe" drives a 1981 Pontiac Firebird Trans Am.

The Onion's Biden is typically described as a blue-collar everyman with a taste for partying and debauchery. Often referred to by the nickname "Diamond Joe", the character loves hair metal and classic rock from the 1970s and 1980s. He drives a 1981 Pontiac Firebird Trans Am and motorcycles. He also noticeably has tattoos. According to New York Times journalist Jeremy W. Peters, the Onion staff wrote Biden in "one of two molds: Boozy and brash, or slick and over-sexed." In 2013, the direction of the character took a turn in articles that depicted him as a criminal and gang member; this arc deepened the following year, as Biden became a drug dealer and user, particularly of cannabis. The character has an intense bromance with Obama, although it is not necessarily reciprocated.

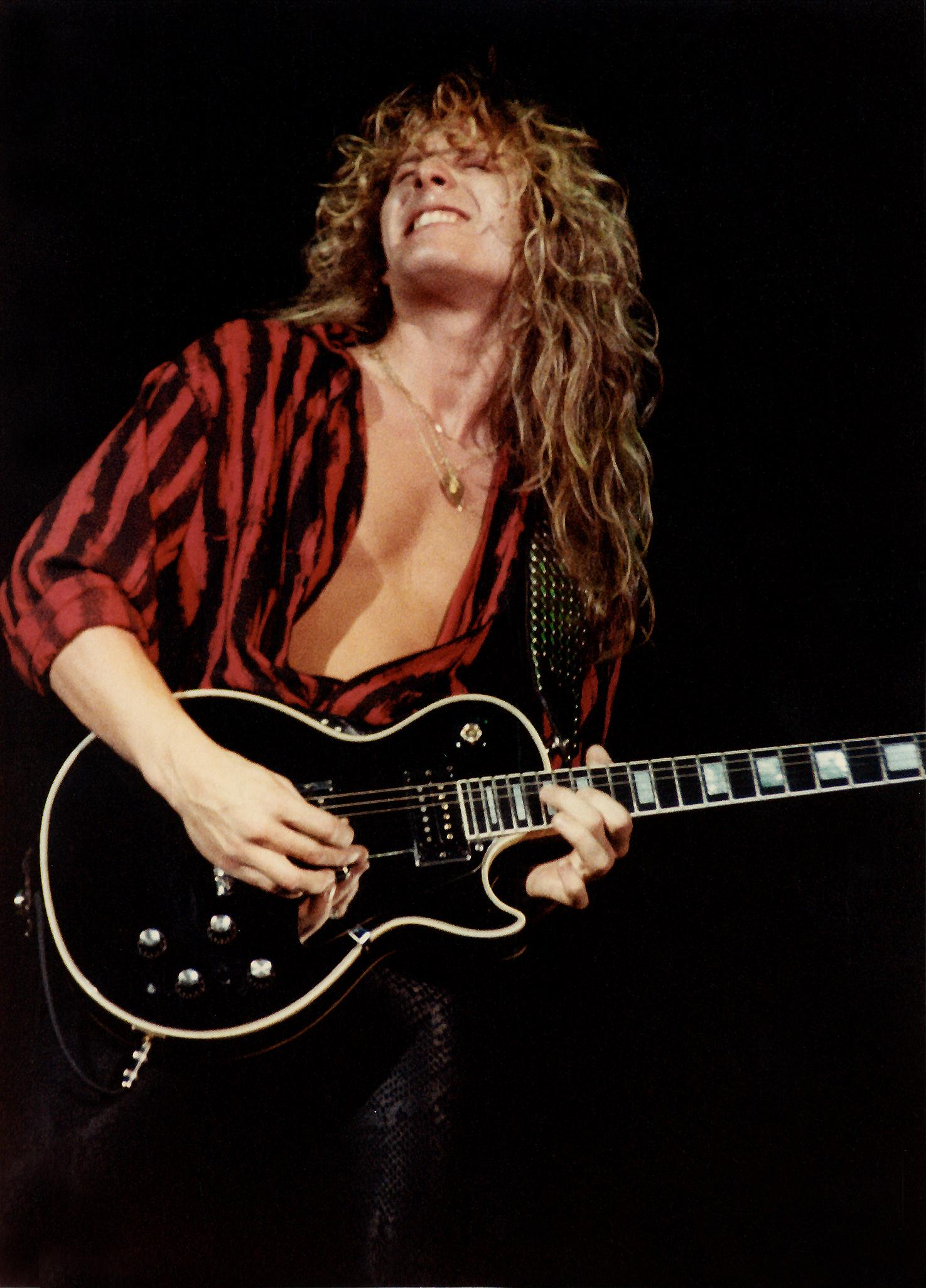
The Onion's Biden is a fan of 1980s hair metal (John Sykes of Whitesnake pictured in 1984).

The Onion's Biden shares little in common with Biden's real life, career, or behavior; indeed, as Dave Itzkoff put it, the character shares little at all with "any version of established reality or fact." For instance, while the Onion's Biden is a binge drinker, the real Biden is a teetotaler. Unlike the Onion Biden's preference for the Trans Am, the real Biden said his car of choice is the Chevrolet Corvette—to which Nackers responded, "So that's the thing, he is into a muscle car still." The portrayal is almost entirely apolitical, especially compared to The Onion's more pointed satirizing of other major political figures. Joel Goldstein, a law professor and expert on vice-presidential history, said that a likely reason for The Onion's divergent take on Biden is that the vice president holds an "awkward office" in a support role to the president's agenda, making it difficult to satirize in its own right.

Most of the similarities between the two Bidens are in the broad outlines of their image and personality. In political terms, Biden's reputation as a liberal populist corresponds to the character's blue-collar life. The Onion's Biden has much in common with Biden's image as a "goofy uncle" and his nickname "Uncle Joe". A headline like "Biden Loses Control of Butterfly Knife during Commencement Speech" is an extreme exaggeration of some of Biden's perceived traits, like his "reported gaffes and generally casual demeanor." Mark Leibovich said part of the character's plausibility stems from the contrast between Biden's image and those of his contemporaries, posing the rhetorical questions: "Would The Onion put a shirtless John Kerry washing a Trans Am in the driveway of the State Department? Speaker Boehner wearing a ponytail at the Inauguration? Harry Reid getting banned for life from Dave & Buster's restaurants ('following dozens of complaints from wait staff and numerous incidents')?" Brian Resnick, writing for The Atlantic, said both have a "larger-than-life" quality. In Nackers's view, the overlap where the "real personality converges with Diamond Joe" is that both have "a heart of gold".

Compared to most comedic portrayals of Biden, The Onion's was unconventional in its almost complete detachment from his real attributes. Other comedians and satirists tended to portray Biden as a well-meaning buffoon prone to gaffes, exaggerating the politician's actual or perceived traits without making outlandish embellishments. Jim Downey—a comedian and longtime writer on Saturday Night Live—described the Onion parody as somewhat risky, because it implicitly relies on the audience's understanding of how dissimilar it is from the real Biden. For the humor to work, Downey said readers "have to know that it's completely wrong and arbitrary", but readers without an existing impression of Biden may believe that the parody is referencing some of his actual characteristics. Similarly, the scholar Nicholas Holm said the character's humor comes from two things: the "sheer unlikeliness" of his traits, and the extreme contrast with "the gaffe-prone and folksy, but generally affable, public presentation of Biden."

== Notable appearances (2009–2017) ==
"The 6 best Onion parodies of Joe Biden" (according to The Week)

1. "Biden Receives Lifetime Ban from Dave & Buster's"
2. "Biden Says Life Better Than It Was 4 Years Ago But Nothing Can Touch Summer of '87"
3. "Shirtless Biden Washes Trans Am in White House Driveway"
4. "Joe Biden Hitchhikes to Democratic National Convention"
5. "Biden to Cool His Heels in Mexico for a While"
6. "Biden to Honor Fallen Soldiers by Jumping Motorcycle Over Vietnam Memorial"

— Samantha Rollins (January 18, 2013)

In his two terms as vice president between 2009 and 2017, Biden was the subject of more than 50 articles and multiple videos in The Onion. The newspaper would sometimes publish multiple articles about Biden in quick succession, as they did for Biden's appearance at the 2016 Democratic National Convention.

One of the Onion's Twitter accounts, @OnionPolitics, live-tweeted the October 11, 2012 vice presidential debate between Biden and Republican candidate Paul Ryan. The website ran four stories on Biden that day along with a manipulated image of Biden wearing his "lucky debate suit", which was a jacket similar to Michael Jackson's Thriller jacket that exposed his hairy chest.

In January 2013, The Onion published the e-book President of Vice: The Autobiography of Joe Biden as a Kindle single through Amazon's Kindle Store. The book, ostensibly an autobiography, gives a fictionalized account of Biden's life in the character's voice. Most of the book's plot deviates completely from Biden's life story—there is, for example, a description of Biden meeting God during some "mystical-ass experiences" in the summer of 1987—but it also offers alternate retellings of real incidents, like Biden's role in Robert Bork's unsuccessful Supreme Court nomination. As part of the promotion for the book, The Onion participated in an AMA ("Ask Me Anything") on Reddit's IAmA by responding in-character to user-submitted questions.

External image
- Ice sculpture of Joe Biden on a motorcycle from the 2016 "Diamond Joe Biden's Badass Balls-to-the-Wall Fiesta" at the Newseum. Photo by Shannon Finney, at Getty Images.

On April 30, 2016, The Onion hosted a Biden-themed event to coincide with the White House Correspondents' Dinner. Titled "Diamond Joe Biden's Badass Balls-to-the-Wall Fiesta", the event was hosted at the Newseum in Washington, D.C. The event featured an ice sculpture of Biden riding a Harley-Davidson motorcycle and a string quartet playing renditions of hair-metal songs. Biden was invited to attend, but declined. Sam Sanders at NPR reported that it was the "most popular" of the several unofficial events orbiting that year's Correspondents' Dinner.

In one of the last Biden articles before the inauguration of Donald Trump, titled "Biden Sadly Realizes This Could Be Last Time He Throws Lit Firecracker Into Press Conference", the character remarked that it was the "end of an era, man."

After Biden left office, The Onion mostly dropped the popular character but found similar breakout success with its portrayal of Donald Trump's sons, Donald Jr. and Eric, who are depicted partaking in childish misadventures as the "Trump boys". Meanwhile, The Onion has portrayed Biden's successor Mike Pence as stiff and uptight, which Nackers called a "weird reverse-Biden role".

== Popularity and reception ==
... Biden was a fucking blast.

— Chad Nackers, then–head writer for The Onion in 2017

Articles about Biden were some of the most-read articles on The Onion's site of their time. Analytical measurements of web traffic showed that, by November 2010, the first major Biden article ("Shirtless Biden Washes Trans Am") had accumulated more than 500,000 page views, while the video "Biden Criticized for Appearing in Hennessy Ads" had been viewed 450,000 times. The site drew about 7.5 million unique visitors per month at that time, and as such the metrics for the Biden pieces were considered substantial. Editor Will Tracy said Biden had been a "breakout character" and "fan favorite" during the Obama administration.

The character has received widespread praise in the media. Mike Pesca, host of the podcast The Gist, said he considered the Onion's Biden to be one of "the great comic characters of our day" alongside Homer Simpson, Gob Bluth and Tobias Fünke of Arrested Development, and Selina Meyer of Veep. The month before the 2012 presidential election, Slate named the character as the best parody of Biden—topping the animated Biden on SuperNews!, Jason Sudeikis's performances on Saturday Night Live, and Bill Barol's essay "My Name Is Joe Biden and I'll Be Your Server" in The New Yorker. Time magazine ranked The Onion's Biden at number 7 on a list of the top 10 political memes of 2012. When The Onion discontinued its print edition in 2013, staffers at the Los Angeles Times named the Biden character among their favorite work published by The Onion. Marc Hogan at Pitchfork listed "The 20 Best Onion Articles About Music" and included "Biden Huddling With Closest Advisers on Whether to Spend 200 Bucks on Scorpions Tickets".

=== In light of allegations of Biden's inappropriate physical contact with women ===
After Lucy Flores published an essay in 2019 alleging Biden had inappropriately kissed and touched her, there was renewed attention on other allegations that Biden has made inappropriate physical contact with women. In turn, the increased attention on the issue prompted critical reassessments of the Onion's portrayal of Biden, particularly the character's interactions with women. Antonia Noori Farzan at The Washington Post said some of the older headlines about Biden and women—like "Biden Invokes Freedom of Information Act to Find Out When Woman Gets off Work" and "Biden Invites Nation's Women to Tax Code Discussion at Private Mountain Chalet"—had "a sharper edge now that multiple women have said that Biden's close physical contact at public events made them feel uncomfortable."

To some, The Onion had tacitly excused Biden's conduct or minimized the seriousness of inappropriate behavior toward women. The New Yorker's Katy Waldman wrote that the Onion's articles about Biden "made hypermasculine tropes look not only unthreatening but delightful" and "were the satirical equivalent of petting the Labrador on the head". Gavin Fernando at The New Zealand Herald noted Biden's tendency to touch women at public events had "rarely been criticised directly" in the media despite widespread awareness, highlighting an Onion story from 2009 that had "zoned in on his behavior towards women" yet all the while depicted him as "endearing and lovable."

Conversely, other commentators felt that the Onion's jokes had called attention to the issue of Biden's inappropriate behavior toward women without necessarily glorifying or excusing his behavior. Joe Berkowitz at Fast Company wrote that "[e]ven the Onion, whose memification of the Veep ... helped shore up affection for [him], couldn't help commenting on his attitudes toward women from time to time." Maureen Callahan at the New York Post said The Onion had "spoofed Biden's sleaziness as early as 2009", which she cited as proof that Biden's perceived inappropriate behavior had been in the public eye for a long time and would not be easy or morally acceptable to minimize or excuse. Matthew Yglesias at Vox said that the discussion about Biden and women had raised the "issue" of "what standard of conduct is acceptable for men in power" and that, on that topic, the overarching meaning of The Onion's long-running "joke" about Biden had been that the vice president "really was an old-school presence in the Obama White House".

== Reactions from Biden and his staff ==
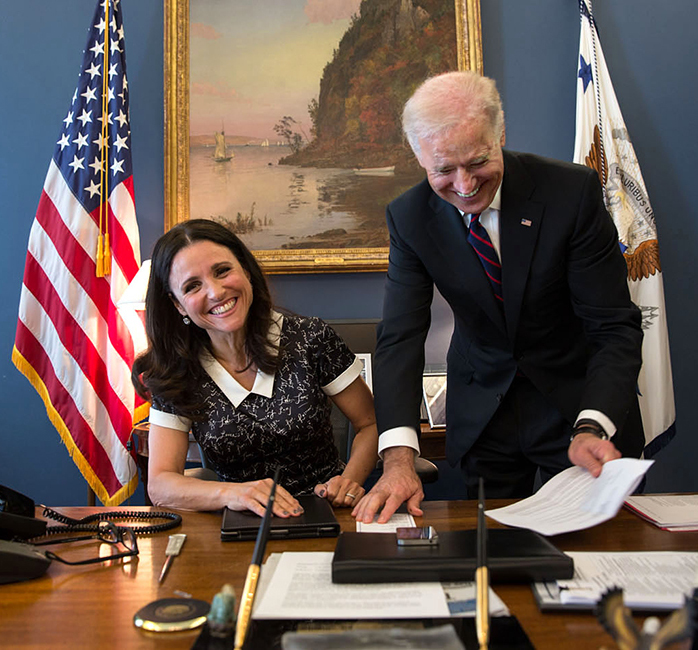
Biden laughing with Julia Louis-Dreyfus, who played Vice President Selina Meyer in the comedy series Veep

Biden publicly commented on the character on several occasions, generally indicating that he enjoyed the Onion articles about him. He also tended to express relief that the character was so radically different from his actual personality and poked fun at the Onion Biden's affinity for the Trans Am. Beyond his public comments, Onion staffers have said members of Biden's staff privately conveyed his enjoyment of the character to them. Biden reacted with similar approval to most comedic portrayals of himself.

Will Tracy, an associate editor at The Onion, told the New York Times in 2010 that the Office of the Vice President had sent the Onion staff an email with the message "Keep it up. He really likes it." Tracy commented, "Apparently he's a fan." Biden's office denied being aware of any communication between the Vice President and The Onion. When the Times reporter requested an interview with Biden to confirm Tracy's statement, White House Press Secretary Jay Carney denied the request and replied, "Let me get this straight: You want to interview the vice president about stories about him in The Onion? Well, I'll give you credit for trying."

In a 2011 video interview with Yahoo! News, Biden was asked about The Onion and said most of his acquaintances and even members of the press tended to think of him as "a little bit square", but "now, I'm the philanderer. I think it's hilarious, the stuff they do on me." He also said he was "flattered" that the character was "totally inconsistent with my personality." At HuffPost, Ross Luippold said his interview answer "seemed alternately tickled and confused by the mockery."

Later that year, Car and Driver magazine asked Biden, "Sadly, we must ask about the Onion story. While shirtless, have you ever washed a 1981 Pontiac Trans Am in your driveway?" He replied, "You think I'd drive a Trans Am? I have been in my bathing suit in my driveway and not only washed my Goodwood-green 1967 Corvette but also simonized it. At least the Onion should have had me washing a Trans Am convertible. I love convertibles."

Eric Metaxas discussed the character with Biden at the 2012 National Prayer Breakfast. Metaxas, who was the event's keynote speaker, was making small talk with Biden before his speech and asked the vice president if he was aware of the Onion pieces. According to Metaxas, Biden replied "yes, he had seen them, and he didn't mind them at all, because they were so obviously about someone who was completely different from what he was really like. ... Then he added, as a kind of Q.E.D.: 'For one thing, I hate [Chevrolet] Camaros!'"

When Reddit hosted an AMA for the Onion's Biden in January 2013, the @VP Twitter account tweeted the following:

Avatar of Office of VP Biden

Office of VP Biden
(@VP)
tweeted:

Q for @reddit AMA with my @TheOnion pal: A Trans-Am? Ever look under the hood of a Corvette? #imavetteguy –VP

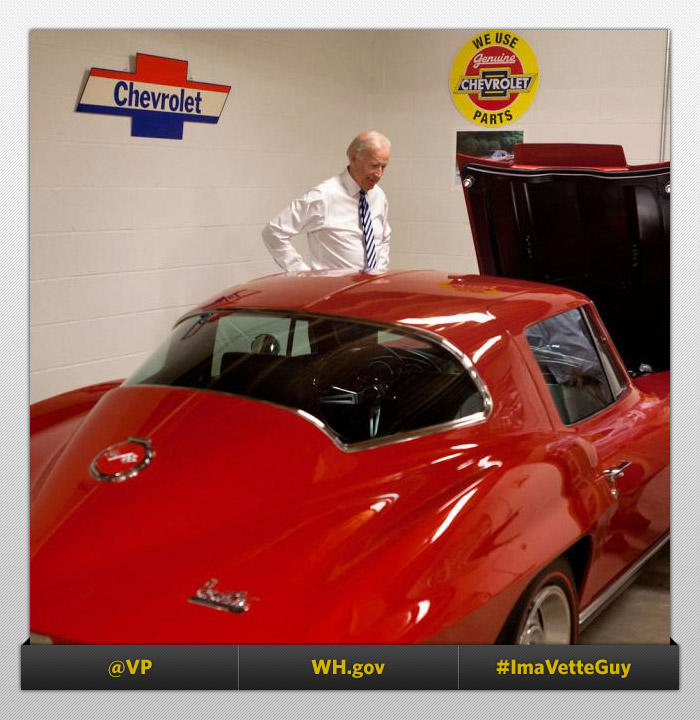

January 18, 2013

The signature "–VP" was used to credit the tweet to Biden personally, rather than a member of his staff. A photo of Biden standing beside a Chevrolet Corvette was attached to the tweet. The presidential account retweeted it soon after it was posted. The Onion's Biden did not reply to the real one's tweet, but it did respond to a Reddit user's question about the Corvette: "I think there's some imposter out there spreading bad shit about me. I'll tell ya right now, whatever they say nothing can come between me and my Zam."

In an April 2016 interview with CNBC, Biden said that he was "not comfortable with goofy Uncle Joe ... And by the way, the so-called goofy Uncle Joe—if you notice, I beat every Republican in every poll when they thought I was running [in 2016]. You notice that my favorability was higher than anybody that's running for office in either party." While this was not a direct comment on The Onion, Biden's image as "goofy Uncle Joe" was closely associated with, and influenced by, The Onion.

=== As a public relations strategy ===
According to several academic commentators, Biden engaged with comedic portrayals of himself as a public relations strategy. Historian Edward L. Widmer said Biden's public embrace of the Onion and other parodies helped to signal his sense of humor and show "a quality of humanity." Joel Goldstein, a law professor at Saint Louis University, said he believed Biden's reactions were likely sincere but, even if Biden actually disliked The Onion's portrayal, "the worst mistake [he] could make is being offended by it". In the journal Critical Studies in Media Communication, Don J. Waisanen and Amy B. Becker wrote that Biden responded approvingly to comedic portrayals that reinforced his "folksy" public image, which further cultivated that perception.

== Effect on Biden's image ==
[T]he series is less concerned with naming and shaming comic flaws with the real Biden than it is with constructing an entirely independent self-sustaining comic persona. The humour of The Onion's ongoing coverage of womanising, thrill-seeking, drug-dealing Biden is the result of a self-perpetuating internal logic of ever-increasing goofiness that is constantly moving away from any engagement with the political existence of the real Biden. By the time 'Biden Lines Up Sweet Summer Gig Installing Above-Ground Swimming Pools' [in June 2016], The Onion has moved so far away from the original political context that despite the highly politicised nature of its subject, the joke has no grounding in the political sphere, let alone a critical politics.

— Nicholas Holm, Humour as Politics: The Political Aesthetics of Contemporary Comedy (2017)

There is a general consensus that The Onion made an impact on Biden's public image. In 2014, Jonathan Bernstein at Bloomberg Opinion attributed Biden's image to a combination of The Onion's character and the vice president's own actions and personality. "All veeps become ridiculous; the only question is how", Bernstein wrote, and "once the Onion came up with the image, it seemed to fit really well."

Scholar Byron C. Wallace suggested The Onion's patently absurd, often risqué characterization of Biden would be easily recognized as implausible by most readers and that, as such, their articles about Biden were presumptively less likely to be mistaken for real news than other, subtler satirical content. On the other hand, the heightened contrast between the fiction and the real person has prompted concern that readers' impression of The Onion's Biden could supplant their impression of the real Biden. The Onion editor Tracy remarked in 2012: "My sense is that we've done so much on him that our vision for our version of Joe Biden has, in some way, seeped into the nation's consciousness [and] people think our character of Joe Biden is somehow him." In a profile of Biden for The New Republic, George Blaustein asked:

Has a satire ever so effectively overwritten the image of a politician? ... The full corpus of Diamond Joe amounts to a powerful and paradoxical new origin story. It is intriguing that this fantasy caricature of Biden makes him an endearing outlaw when the real Biden's political legacy includes the 1994 Crime Bill, and the terrible scale of mass incarceration that followed from it.

Nevertheless, it remains difficult to quantify The Onion's impact on Biden's image, and so the precise extent of the newspaper's influence is unclear. Jeremy Gordon at The Outline doubted the extent of The Onion's effect on Biden's popularity, noting that the website's audience had decreased in the preceding years and that its audience skewed younger and more liberal than Biden's base of predominantly older, moderate Democrats. Conversely, historian Christine Wenc has argued that The Onion's dominance in its home state of Wisconsin helped Biden to win it as the third-closest state of the 2020 United States presidential election.

=== In Internet culture ===
The Onion's Biden became a popular meme and influenced perceptions of Biden in Internet culture, particularly during the Obama administration. Seth Millstein at the women's magazine Bustle ranked The Onion character as the 13th best Biden meme (out of 15) and said it had "played an enormous role in shaping the public's perception of Biden." Regarding Biden's chances of appealing to Millennial voters in the 2020 Democratic presidential primaries, Peter Hamby at Vanity Fair wrote that Biden may be "old, but thanks to the Onion and his Uncle Joe persona, he's already optimized for meme culture."

In addition to becoming a meme in its own right, The Onion's Biden influenced other memes and online discourse about Biden, which frequently imagined him as a roguish goof paired with Obama as the more serious "straight man". A viral tweet from Twitter user @blippoblappo played off this dynamic:

Avatar of blupman

blupman
(@blippoblappo)
tweeted:

REPORTER: Mr. President, what's your favorite Wu Tang album?

OBAMA: What kind of question is –

[biden grabs podium]

BIDEN: LIQUID SWORDS

April 26, 2014

Brian Feldman at New York magazine wrote that "Biden-joke pedants might point out that the butt-rock-loving Biden of the Onion would probably not be a Wu-Tang Clan fan," but @blippoblappo's tweet "nevertheless carries with it the same myth-making potency: an image that it feels more true than the actual truth."

=== In the Congressional Record ===
The character entered the Congressional Record on at least two occasions. During the presidential transition of Donald Trump, Mitch McConnell referenced the character in a December 2016 speech to the Senate floor delivered in tribute to Biden. McConnell said, "When The Onion ran a mock photo of him washing a Trans Am in the White House driveway shirtless, America embraced it. And so did he."

In June 2019, while giving testimony to the House Intelligence Committee on the topic of "deepfake" imagery, former FBI agent Clint Watts discussed The Onion's manipulated photo of Biden washing a car shirtless. Some members of Congress later pointed to the Onion image as an example of potential problems with moderating deepfake imagery—namely, the difficulty of trying to distinguish between satire and fake news.

=== Criticism from former Onion editor ===
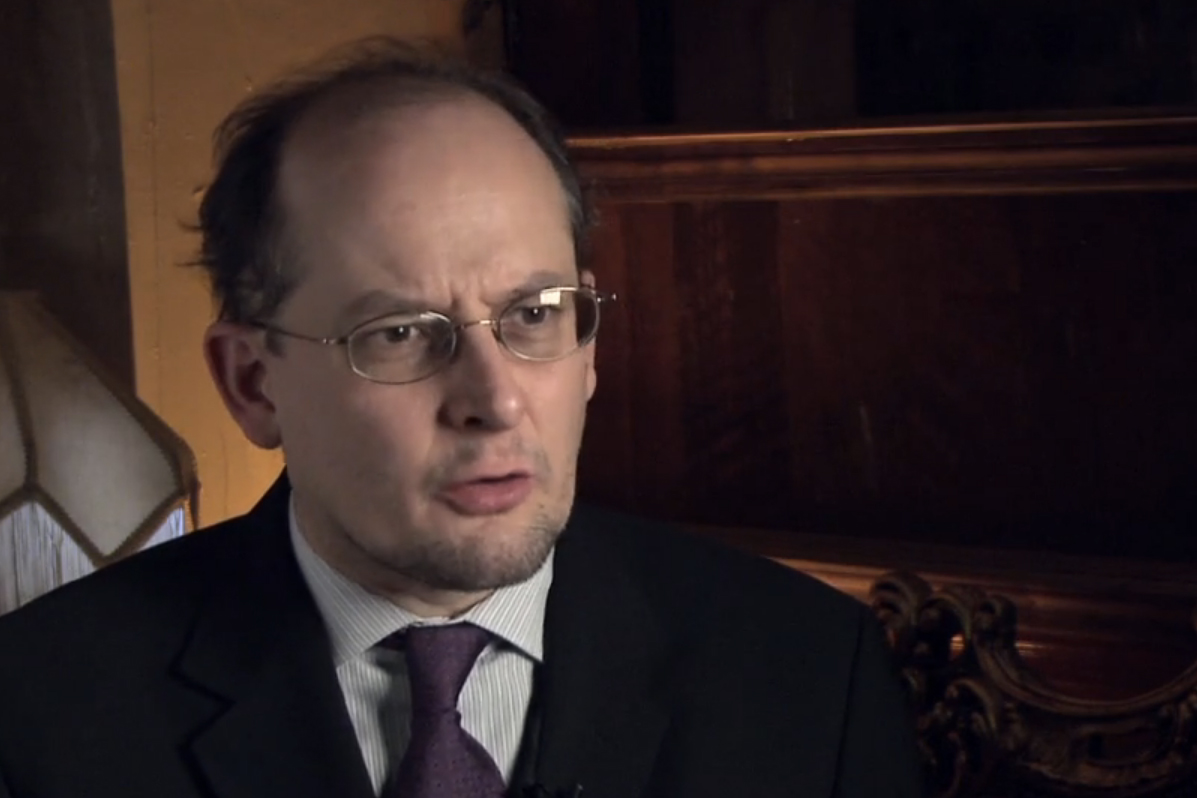
Former Onion editor Joe Garden (pictured in 2010) expressed regret over the paper's approach to Biden.

Joe Garden—a former Onion writer and editor who left in 2012 after 19 years—publicly criticized the newspaper's portrayal of Biden in May 2019. After he tweeted some of his recent thoughts about the character, Vice published a full op-ed by Garden titled "Area Man Regrets Helping Turn Joe Biden into a Meme".

In the Vice piece, Garden wrote that he still believed the Biden pieces were funny in their light-hearted way. However, he had also come to believe they had failed as satire because "[i]nstead of viciously skewering a public figure who deserved scrutiny, we let him off easy". In hindsight, he said, Biden's vocal approval of the character should have been a red flag indicating that their satire was ineffective. He compared their work to Trump's appearance as the host of Saturday Night Live in 2015 and Jimmy Fallon's interview with Trump on The Tonight Show in 2016, both of which had been criticized as overly conciliatory treatments that downplayed what he felt were inflammatory and racist aspects of Trump's messaging. Garden concluded:

I don't believe The Onion's Biden is solely responsible for this early popularity of real-life Biden. We were just one small link in a chain of institutions that didn't scrutinize Biden closely enough. I wish we had looked more at his actual career in politics—which includes opposition to busing as a way to integrate schools and support for predatory financial institutions—and tried to really puncture him, rather than just turning him into a clown. We helped make him more likable by inventing a version of Biden that never existed. ... As a guideline, if the people you're satirizing aren't mad, then you should dig deeper. I hope that my alma mater, and everyone else in comedy, follows this rule now that Diamond Joe is back.

Garden's op-ed was discussed in The Washington Post and The New York Times.

== Retirement of the character (2019–present) ==
You can't understand what the Onion is today without first understanding the extent to which the outlet feels haunted by the ghost of Joe Biden. Or, more accurately, 'Joe Biden'.

— Derek Robertson, Politico (February 2020)

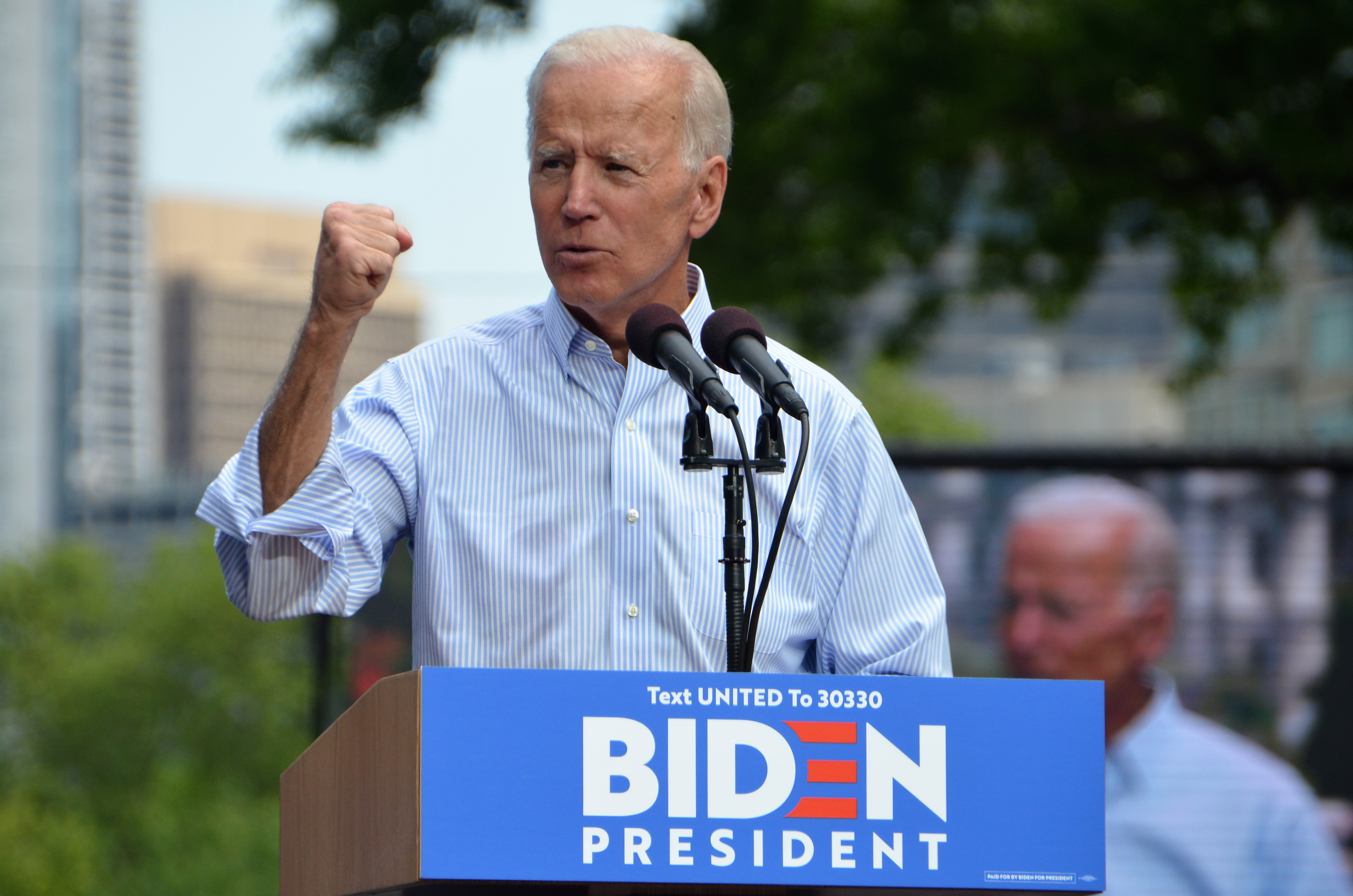
The Onion briefly revived its fanciful version of Biden (pictured in May 2019), but subsequently took its satirical coverage of the candidate in a more critical and straightforward direction.

Shortly after Biden announced his 2020 presidential campaign in March 2019, the character briefly reemerged in a story titled "Biden Pulls Off Dusty Tarp Covering Old Campaign Motorcycle". Since then, The Onion abandoned its formerly warm, fanciful characterization of Biden. Its subsequent satirical coverage of the candidate has become more critical and direct. Recent articles have tended to focus on real-world developments in the presidential race, such as his frequent gaffes, and issues like public concern over Biden's age and mental acuity.

Noting the turn, secondary sources have cited late-2019 Onion headlines like the following:

- "Jill Biden Urges Democratic Voters to Ignore Which Candidates Are Mentally Sharp Enough to Finish Complete Sentences for Good of Party" (described as "just brutal" in the conservative website Townhall);
- "'Help! Help! Who Am I? Where Am I? Who Are You People?' Says Biden in Embarrassing Campaign Gaffe" (described as "devastating" by liberal pundit Amanda Marcotte);
- "Biden Declares Self Only Candidate Who Can Defeat George Bush in 1988 Election" (dubbed the "best evidence [of] bad news for Team Biden" in New York magazine).

== See also ==
- Dark Brandon, a comically menacing characterization of Biden that emerged in 2022 social media memes
- List of Internet phenomena § Politics
- Jason Sudeikis, who played Biden on Saturday Night Live during the Obama presidency
- Public image of Barack Obama and Obama on social media
- Donald Trump in popular culture and on social media
- Stephen Colbert (character), the fictional alter ego adopted by comedian Stephen Colbert on the satirical late-night show The Colbert Report
- The dictionary definition of '"avuncular"' at Wiktionary
- Political satire
