= Joe Garden =

American comedy writer

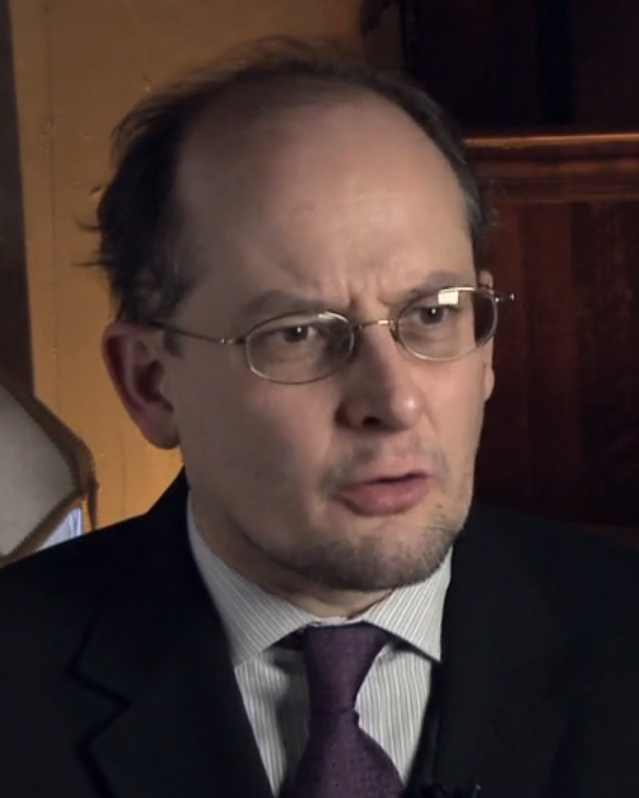
- Garden in 2010
- Born: March 10, 1970 (age 56)
- Occupation: Comedy writer
- Years active: 1990s-present
- Known for: The Onion

Joe Garden (born March 10, 1970) is an American comedy writer. He was a features editor at The Onion, an American satirical news organization, where he created the characters Jim Anchower and Jackie Harvey. He has also had at least one cameo in the publication as himself.

He has co-written three books, The Dangerous Book for Dogs, The Devious Book for Cats and The New Vampire's Handbook: A Guide for the Recently Turned Creature of the Night. He has also been a contributing writer for the PBS animated children's program WordGirl, has appeared in the film Bad Meat, and was the voice of Phil Cabinet in the Aqua Teen Hunger Force episode "Hypno-Germ."

== Books ==
- The Onion (4 April 2000). The Onion's Finest News Reporting, Volume 1. Three Rivers Press. ISBN 978-0609804636.
- The Onion (4 September 2001). Dispatches from the Tenth Circle: The Best of The Onion. Three Rivers Press. ISBN 978-0609808344.
- The Onion (24 September 2002). The Onion Ad Nauseam: Complete News Archives, Volume 13. Three Rivers Press. ISBN 978-1400047246.
- The Onion (23 September 2003). The Onion Ad Nauseam: Complete News Archives, Volume 14. Three Rivers Press. ISBN 978-1400049615.
- Loew, Mike; Garden, Joe; Ostrow, Randy (4 July 2004). Citizen You!: Helping Your Government Help Itself. The New Press. ISBN 978-1565849150.
- The Onion (28 September 2004). Fanfare for the Area Man: The Onion Ad Nauseam Complete News Archives, Vol. 15. Three Rivers Press. ISBN 978-1400054558.
- The Onion (4 October 2005). Embedded in America: The Onion Complete News Archives Volume 16. Three Rivers Press. ISBN 978-1400054565.
- The Onion (31 October 2006). Homeland Insecurity: The Onion Complete News Archives, Volume 17. Three Rivers Press. ISBN 978-0307339843.
- Rex and Sparky (2007). The Dastardly Book For Dogs. HarperCollins Publishers. ISBN 978-0007267309.
- The Onion (30 October 2007). Our Dumb World: The Onion's Atlas of the Planet Earth, 73rd Edition. Little, Brown And Company. ISBN 978-0316018425.
- Garden, Joe; Ginsburg, Janet; Pauls, Chris; Serwacki, Anita; Sherman, Scott (28 October 2008). The Devious Book for Cats: A Parody. Villard. ISBN 978-0345508492.
- Garden, Joe; Ginsburg, Janet; Pauls, Chris; Serwacki, Anita; Sherman, Scott (8 September 2009). The New Vampire's Handbook: A Guide for the Recently Turned Creature of the Night. Villard. ISBN 978-0345508560.

== Trivia ==
In 2009, Garden contributed to the introduction of a novelty book This Is Why You're Fat: Where Dreams Become Heart Attacks (October 27, 2009, ISBN 978-0-06-193663-0), a book co-authored by Richard Blakeley.

After it was announced that Conan O'Brien would be taking over Jay Leno's hosting duties on The Tonight Show, Garden launched a mock Internet campaign titled "Vote Joe Garden!" with the aim of democratizing the selection of O'Brien's replacement for Late Night. The bid was unsuccessful as NBC announced that Jimmy Fallon would replace O'Brien in 2009.
