= Robert Lee Massie =

American murderer

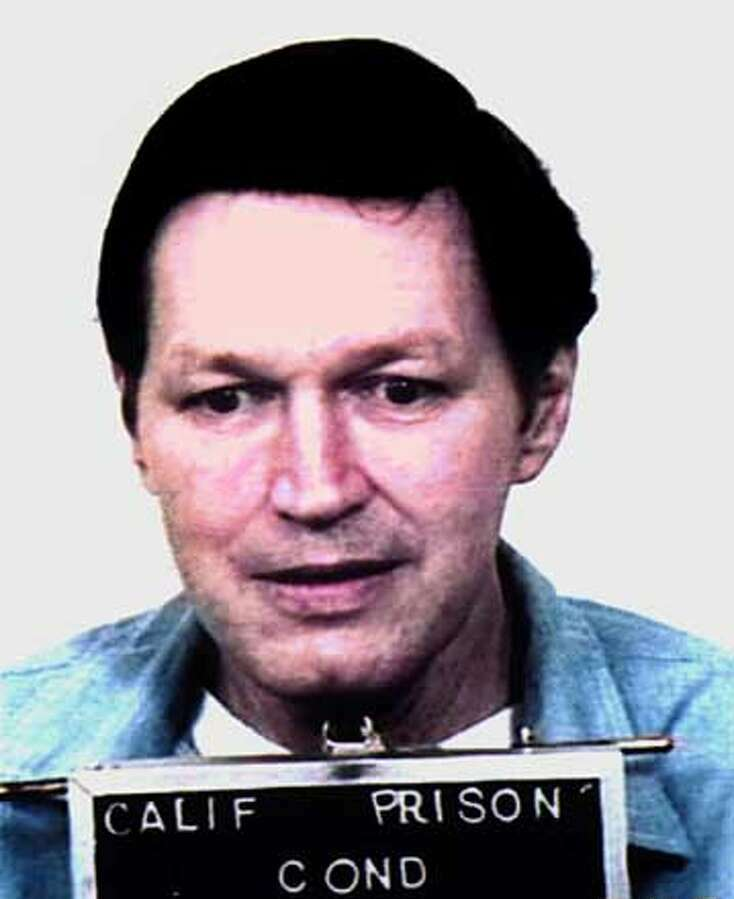
- Born: December 24, 1941; Virginia, U.S.
- Died: March 27, 2001 (aged 59); San Quentin State Prison, California, U.S.
- Status: Executed by lethal injection
- Convictions: First degree murder with special circumstances First degree murder Attempted murder (2 counts); Assault with a deadly weapon Robbery (7 counts); Possession of a concealable weapon by an ex-felon (4 counts)
- Penalty: Death; commuted to Life imprisonment with the possibility of parole (1965); Death (May 25, 1979)

Details
- Victims: Mildred Weiss, 48; Boris G. Naumoff, 61
- Span of crimes: January 7, 1965 – January 3, 1979
- Country: United States
- State: California
- Date apprehended: For the final time: January 4, 1979

Robert Lee Massie (December 24, 1941 – March 27, 2001) was an American convicted murderer who was executed by the state of California for the 1979 murder of a liquor store owner in San Francisco. Massie's case was notable because he had previously been sentenced to death for another murder he committed in 1965, but that death sentence was overturned following Furman v. Georgia. He was resentenced to life in prison and then paroled in 1978, committing the second murder months after his release. Following his death sentence for the 1979 murder, it was overturned by the Supreme Court of California because his lawyer had not consented to a guilty plea. He was sentenced to death a third and final time in 1989 and was executed in 2001 at San Quentin State Prison via lethal injection.

== Early life ==
Massie was born on December 24, 1941, in Virginia to a 15-year-old girl and a man who had married her to avoid being charged with statutory rape. During his childhood he was subjected to physical abuse including whippings and having his head held underwater. At age 11, Massie was sent to the Beaumont School in Virginia for truant and runaway boys, where pupils were whipped with a leather belt if they misbehaved. At age 17, Massie stole a car and was sentenced to prison, where four inmates gang-raped him. As a result, he feigned insanity and was committed to a prison psychiatric facility.

== Murders ==
=== Mildred Weiss ===
On the evening of January 7, 1965, Massie approached a man who was getting out of a car outside his home in West Covina, California. Armed with a rifle, Massie hit him in the mouth and demanded all of his money. The man handed Massie his wallet, and Massie shot at him, with the bullet grazing the side of his head. He then fled the area. Later that night, Massie attempted to rob more people. As couple Morris and Mildred Weiss returned to their San Gabriel home, Massie confronted them. As Mildred exited her vehicle, Massie approached the couple and fatally shot Mildred. He then got into a nearby getaway car and escaped.

On January 15, Massie encountered a man named Frank Patti at MacArthur Park in Los Angeles. After speaking with one another, they headed to Patti's hotel room, where Massie took out a revolver and demanded all of Patti's money. In addition, he ordered Patti to strip naked. Patti refused and attacked Massie, who fired off three rounds before fleeing. Two shots hit Patti in his stomach while the third grazed his neck. On January 20, Massie was apprehended and charged with the assault on Patti. In a recorded statement, he admitted to committing all of the crimes, including the fatal shooting of Mildred Weiss, whom he had shot in a failed robbery. He was convicted of one count of murder, one count of attempted murder, and four counts of theft. He was sentenced to death for the murder of Weiss. He came close to execution on October 10, 1967; however, Governor Ronald Reagan personally stayed Massie's execution, so he could testify at the retrial of his alleged accomplice, John Vetter. Vetter was acquitted following the retrial.

=== Boris G. Naumoff ===
In 1972, following Furman v. Georgia, in which the Supreme Court of the United States invalidated all death sentences, Massie's death sentence was reduced to life imprisonment. In 1978, the California parole board set him free as he was considered a model prisoner.

On January 3, 1979, Massie entered a San Francisco liquor store and began robbing the owner, 61-year-old Boris G. Naumoff. Another customer entered the store as the robbery continued, oblivious to the crime. As the customer stood next to Massie, she witnessed Naumoff hand over money, which Massie placed in his pocket. Naumoff then reportedly said, "A guy can't make a living anymore." Moments later, an employee of the store entered and spoke with Naumoff. As Massie prepared to leave, Naumoff chased after him and tried to stop him from fleeing with the stolen money. The two wrestled in an aisle, resulting in Massie firing off several rounds. One of the bullets hit Naumoff in the neck, killing him, while another wounded the store employee who was hit in the right thigh. Massie escaped on foot, while the witness who had taken cover behind the counter called police.

== Capture and trials ==
On January 4, at around 10:00 p.m., officers from the San Francisco Police Department captured Massie as he was driving his car. After searching him, they found multiple weapons and several boxes of ammunition. Massie was taken to the San Francisco Hall of Justice where he was interviewed. He admitted that he went to the liquor store, pulled a gun, and attempted to rob the store. He also said the owner had attacked him while leaving, so he shot him. Massie claimed that he was drunk and under the influence of cocaine when he committed the crime.

Massie was charged with first-degree murder in the slaying of Naumoff. He confessed to the crime and pleaded guilty despite his lawyer telling him not to. On May 25, 1979, he was sentenced to death. In 1985, his case was automatically appealed to the Supreme Court of California. The justices overturned his conviction and death sentence as the court ruled that Massie could not plead guilty against the advice of his lawyer. The court ordered a retrial.

In 1989, Massie was retried, and a jury found him guilty of the robbery and murder of Naumoff. He was sentenced to death again for a third and final time. In 1998, the Supreme Court of California upheld his conviction and death sentence.

== Execution ==
In October 2000, Massie dropped his appeals in federal court and asked to be put to death. A federal judge ruled that Massie was mentally competent and allowed him to drop his appeals. Against the wishes of Massie, death penalty opponents tried to stop the execution; however, their efforts failed.

On March 27, 2001, at around 12:20 a.m., the execution of Massie proceeded. Massie was executed in the death chamber at San Quentin State Prison via lethal injection and was pronounced dead at 12:33 a.m. His last meal was two vanilla milkshakes, extra crispy french fries, extra crispy fried oysters, and soft drinks. His final statement was: "Forgiveness. Giving up all hope for a better past." At the time of his death, he was one of California's longest serving death row inmates.

== See also ==
- Capital punishment in California
- Capital punishment in the United States
- List of people executed in California
- List of people executed in the United States in 2001
- Volunteer (capital punishment)

Preceded by Darrell Keith Rich	Executions carried out in California	Succeeded by Stephen Wayne Anderson
