= Keith Daniel Williams =

American triple murderer executed in California (1947–1996)

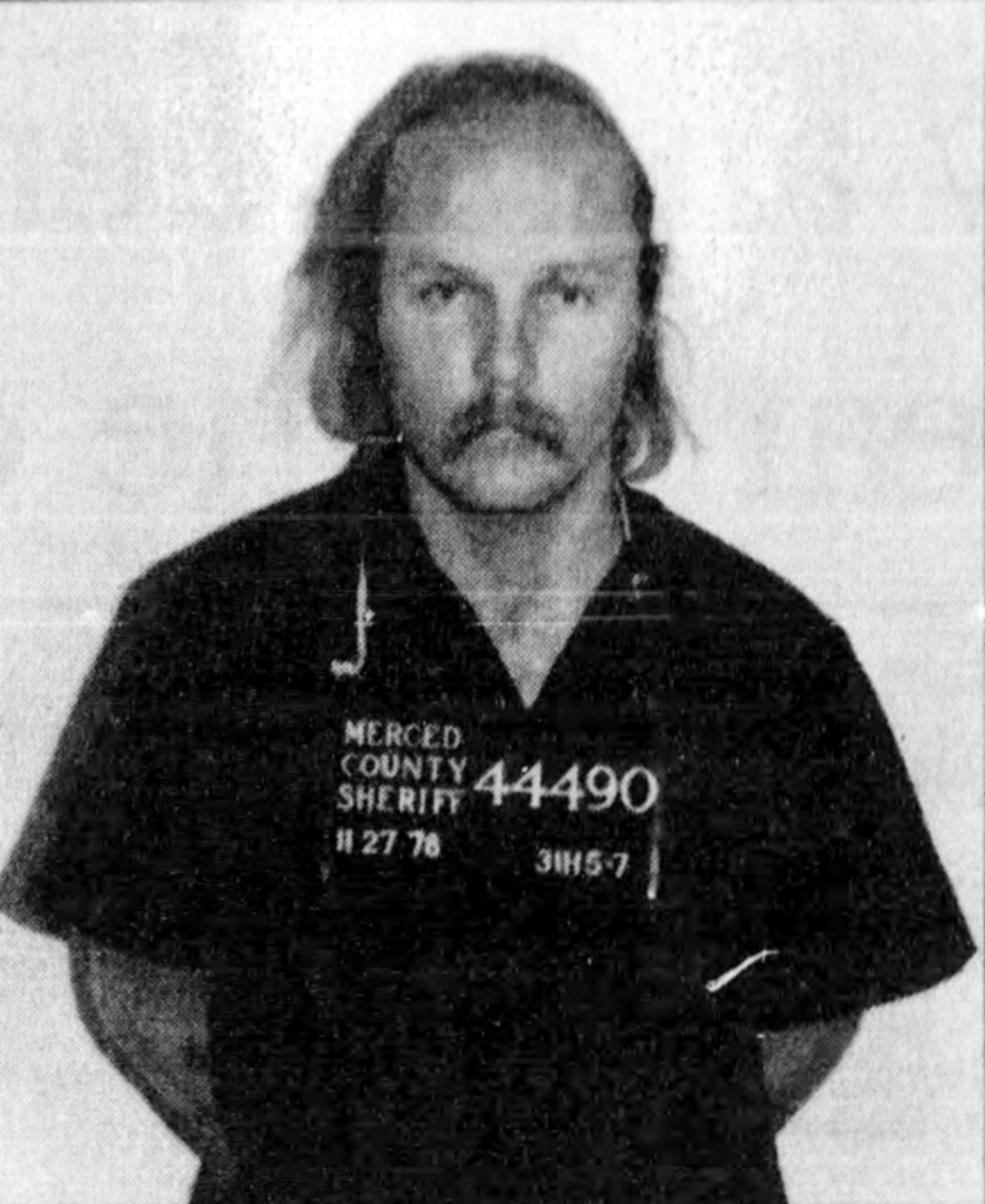
- Williams in a 1978 police mugshot
- Born: June 6, 1947; Pittsburg, California, U.S.
- Status: Executed by lethal injection
- Died: May 3, 1996 (aged 48); San Quentin State Prison, California, U.S.
- Other name: Danny Williams
- Conviction: First degree murder with special circumstances (3 counts)
- Penalty: Death (April 13, 1979)
- Accomplice: Robert Leslie Tyson

Details
- Victims: Miguel Vargas, 31; Lourdes Meza, 25; Salvador Macias, 41
- Date: October 8, 1978
- Country: United States
- State: California
- Weapon: .22 caliber pistol
- Date apprehended: November 24, 1978

Keith Daniel Williams (June 6, 1947 – May 3, 1996) was an American triple murderer who was executed by the state of California for the October 1978 murders of three people in Merced, California. He was convicted and sentenced to death in 1979 and was subsequently executed in 1996 at San Quentin State Prison by lethal injection.

== Early life ==
Keith Daniel Williams was born on June 6, 1947, in Pittsburg, California. He was born prematurely to a single mother who drank during her pregnancy and miscarried his twin brother. As a child, he was described as sickly and had trouble sleeping, eating, and holding down food. Williams' mother married another man in 1948, who treated Williams poorly. His mother would later testify that the family dog was treated better than he was. The family moved frequently and lived in houses, motels, tents, and even a converted chicken coop.

As a teenager, he had multiple accidents, including being struck in the head by an irrigation pipe during a traffic accident and a motorcycle crash that caused him to lapse into a coma. Family members say the accidents altered his memory, in addition to giving him headaches, blackouts, and seizures. Williams dropped out of high school to work as a ranch hand and began taking drugs and drinking heavily. In the early 1960s, he was convicted of several burglaries, auto theft, and attempted forgery. He spent time in the California Youth Authority for juvenile offenders, which allegedly increased his mental problems due to the violence around him.

In 1976, Williams stabbed his best friend and attempted suicide. According to doctors and defense lawyers, Williams suffered from bipolar disorder, which came on during his 20s. After he tried to commit suicide, he checked into the Clairmont Community Hospital in San Diego, but his reckless behavior continued. By 1977, Williams had been arrested eleven times and had spent nearly a third of his life in prison for various offenses. He was a father who had been married twice; however, both marriages ended in divorce. He resided in Corning near his family.

== Murders ==
In September 1978, Williams met 26-year-old Robert Leslie Tyson while working on a remodeling job. The two men worked odd jobs and committed several offenses together, including stealing from their employer. Amongst the stolen items was a gun, which Williams kept for himself. On September 30, Williams, accompanied by his ex-wife and a cousin of hers, Tyson and Tyson's wife, drove to Modesto. On the way, the car broke down, and the five were stranded. Nearby was a camper, which Williams and Tyson decided to rob. The two of them ordered the couple out of the vehicle at gunpoint, stole the vehicle, and drove off, with Williams firing off several rounds over their heads into the air. They pawned some of the stolen goods but kept several items back for a yard sale organized by Tyson's wife.

On October 6, 31-year-old Miguel Vargas, accompanied by his girlfriend, 25-year-old Lourdes Meza, met Williams and Tyson at the yard sale. Williams expressed interest in purchasing Vargas' car, a 1973 Plymouth Road Runner. Vargas said he would sell the car to Williams for $1,500. On October 7, Williams agreed to the deal and handed Vargas a check for $1,500. Vargas said he would not turn over the pink slip for the vehicle until the check cleared the bank. The check, however, had been stolen from the camper, and Williams knew it would not clear. He had also noticed Vargas carried around with him cash which Williams wanted for himself. He came up with a plan to rob and kill Vargas and take his property, speaking of how easy it would be to carry out the crime.

On October 8, Williams and Tyson headed to Vargas' home in Merced, arriving at around 7:00 p.m. that evening. Vargas and Meza were at the house along with several others, including 41-year-old Salvador Macias. Everyone sat around downstairs discussing the sale of the car as well as the sale of a gun Williams owned, which Vargas was interested in buying. By 9:30 p.m., everyone had left, and Williams and Tyson headed outside. They took out guns from the car and returned to the house, with Williams pointing a gun at Vargas and holding it to his neck. Tyson turned the situation into a joke, and they both left. Fifteen minutes later, they returned, this time both armed and serious.

Tyson held Vargas at gunpoint downstairs while Williams headed upstairs to deal with Macias and Meza, who were the only people left in the house. He then ordered Tyson to take care of Meza downstairs while he handled Macias and Vargas upstairs. After asking Vargas where the check was, he shot both Macias and Vargas twice each, killing them. He then stole two guns, Meza's purse, and the check. Tyson, however, could not kill Meza, so Williams prepared to and began shooting her, causing Tyson to panic. Instead, they took Meza with them and drove away in the car. Williams raped Meza in the back of the car during the drive. After driving for over an hour, they stopped in a remote area near Tuolumne City. Williams then took Meza from the car and fatally shot her four times, leaving her naked body abandoned in a field.

== Capture and trial ==
The following day, a relative went to the home of Vargas and found the bodies of both Vargas and Macias. They were found lying face down on the floor and had both been shot in the back of the head. Five days later, Tyson surrendered to the police and gave himself up. He then led police to Meza's naked body, which was still located in the field where Williams had shot her to death. She had been raped and shot four times, although Williams would later claim the sex was consensual. On November 24, 1978, Williams was captured by police in Kingman, Arizona. He later admitted to all three murders in a videotaped confession.

On December 22, 1978, Williams was charged with three counts of murder. On January 2, 1979, he pleaded not guilty by reason of insanity. On March 23, 1979, the trial for Williams began, with Tyson being the main witness for the prosecution. On April 6, the jury found Williams guilty on all three counts of murder. He was acquitted of the rape of Meza because the body was too decomposed for it to be proven that Williams had raped her. On April 10, the jury found Williams was sane when he committed the murders. On April 13, trial judge Donald Fretz sentenced Williams to death.

For his role in the murders, Tyson was sentenced to three concurrent 25-year-to-life sentences.

== Appeals ==
On May 16, 1983, Williams filed the first of a series of appeals in federal and state courts claiming there were problems with his case and that his trial lawyer had been incompetent. On March 14, 1988, the Supreme Court of California issued an opinion affirming the conviction of Williams. On August 18, Williams appealed to the Supreme Court of the United States. On October 11, the court denied the petition.

On February 21, 1989, Williams filed a new petition and requested a stay of execution in a United States district court. On March 8, the court issued a stay of execution. On February 9, 1993, a United States district court denied Williams' petition and removed the stay of execution. On April 22, Williams filed a notice of appeal in the United States Court of Appeals for the Ninth Circuit. On April 7, 1995, the United States Court of Appeals for the Ninth Circuit affirmed the district court's judgment. On December 8, Williams filed a petition in the United States Supreme Court. On February 20, 1996, the Supreme Court of the United States denied Williams's petition.

On March 11, 1996, a Merced County Superior Court judge set an execution date for Williams for May 3, 1996. On April 17, Williams's lawyer filed a clemency request. On April 22, friends and relatives of Williams spoke at the clemency hearing while lawyers filed new appeals in federal and state court. On April 24, Governor Pete Wilson denied clemency to Williams, allowing the execution to proceed.

== Execution ==
On May 3, 1996, in the execution chamber at San Quentin State Prison, at 12:03 a.m., the prison warden gave the order to begin the execution. Williams was executed via lethal injection and was pronounced dead at 12:08 a.m. His last meal consisted of fried pork chops, a baked potato with butter, asparagus, salad with blue cheese dressing, apple pie, and whole milk. He spent his final day with his attorneys and a spiritual advisor. He had no last words.

Some of the family members of the victims supported the execution, while others opposed it. Macias's daughter opposed the execution. Vargas's son, however, described him as a cold, brutal murderer who deserved his punishment. He was quoted as saying, "He should have been dead a long time ago."

== See also ==
- Capital punishment in California
- Capital punishment in the United States
- List of people executed in California
- List of people executed in the United States in 1996

Preceded by William George Bonin	Executions carried out in California	Succeeded by Thomas Martin Thompson
