= Darrell Keith Rich =

American serial killer executed in California (1955–2000)

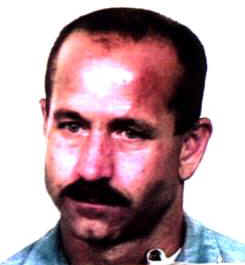
- Born: February 14, 1955; California, U.S.
- Died: March 15, 2000 (aged 45); San Quentin State Prison, San Quentin, California, U.S.
- Cause of death: Execution by lethal injection
- Other names: The Hilltop Rapist; Young Elk
- Spouse: Loretta Summers (January–August 1981)
- Convictions: First degree murder with special circumstances (3 counts); Second degree murder; Kidnapping (3 counts); Rape (3 counts); Forcible oral copulation (4 counts); Attempted forcible oral copulation; Sodomy; Assault with intent to commit rape; Assault with a deadly weapon
- Penalty: Death (January 23, 1981)

Details
- Victims: 4
- Span of crimes: June 13 – August 13, 1978
- Country: United States
- State: California
- Date apprehended: August 23, 1978

Darrell Keith Rich (February 14, 1955 – March 15, 2000), known as The Hilltop Rapist, was an American serial killer and serial rapist who murdered three women and an 11-year-old girl in Redding, California between June and August 1978. He raped five more women and injured another during the same timeframe. He was sentenced to death in California in 1981 for two of the murders and was executed in 2000 at San Quentin State Prison by lethal injection.

== Early life ==
Rich was born on February 14, 1955, in California. Through his biological father, Rich was 1/4 Cherokee. Early in his childhood, Rich was adopted by a Mormon family in Cottonwood, California. His mother was described as domineering and looked after other children as a job, which caused Rich to resent her. He performed poorly in grammar school and was held back a grade. As such, he was referred to the school psychologist, who was concerned that Rich could become violent in the future; however, he received no treatment. Following the divorce of his adoptive parents, Rich began drinking alcohol. At age 15, he showed suicidal behavior after his parents divorced. Rich then began living with his mother in Southern California but later returned to Northern California to live with his father. He was suspended from school for fighting.

At age 17, Rich went hunting after a fight with his girlfriend and shot himself in the chest in an attempted suicide. He also shot over a police car in an attempt at suicide by cop. He was arrested for assault with a deadly weapon and sent to the California Youth Authority, where a psychiatric evaluation determined Rich was suicidal and needed immediate treatment; however, he rejected offers for therapy. After his release from juvenile detention in late 1975, Rich married his girlfriend and had a child with her. In April 1976, Rich was injured in a single-car collision, after which he began physically and verbally abusing his wife. The couple separated several times over the two years, during which time was arrested for DUI and road rage. He also attacked another person with a tire iron.

== Murders ==
On June 13, 1978, Rich abducted a 25-year-old woman as she walked across a bridge in Redding, California. He took her down a hill and tried to force oral sex on her. When she refused, he hit her repeatedly in the head and fractured her skull. He left her for dead, but she was found alive twelve hours later. On June 19, Rich abducted a 21-year-old woman, forced her into his car, and drove her to an isolated area where he raped her. The woman convinced Rich to spare her life when she told him she had an infant child. He let her go and later bragged to friends about how easy it was to attack women. He proceeded to kidnap and rape a 14-year-old girl on June 25, letting her go afterward.

On July 4, Rich attacked two women on the same day in separate incidents. The first was a 19-year-old woman whom he raped and then let go. The second was 19-year-old Anette Fay Edwards, who was walking home from a firework display celebrating Independence Day when Rich abducted her. He raped and then killed her by crushing her skull. Her body was found down an embankment three days later, approximately two miles from her apartment. An autopsy revealed severe injuries to her head. The cause of death was determined as skull fractures inflicted by blunt force.

Rich abducted a 15-year-old girl in Redding riding her bicycle two weeks later. He then raped her and let her go. His second murder was carried out on August 2, when he abducted 17-year-old Patricia Ann Moore. He raped her and then killed her by crushing her head and strangling her. Her body was found two weeks later at a dump. An autopsy revealed severe injuries to her head, and several of her teeth had been broken. The cause of death was determined as head wounds caused by blunt force trauma.

His third murder victim was 27-year-old Linda Diane Slavik, a mother. On August 6, Rich abducted Slavik from a bar and took her to the same dump where he had left Moore's body. After showing Slavik the body, he raped her and then killed her by shooting her with a .22-caliber pistol as she begged for her life. Rich later boasted to his friends that her last words were, "Don't do it, don't do it." Slavik's nude body was found at the same dump, approximately 20 feet from Moore's body. She had been shot twice, with one bullet hitting her in the neck and the second hitting her in the mouth, which had severed the spinal column, causing instant death.

His fourth and final victim was 11-year-old Annette Lynn Selix, whose family was known to Rich. On August 13, he abducted her as she walked to a market to buy groceries. He raped her, forced her to perform oral sex, and then drove her to a bridge which he threw her off. Her body was found underneath the bridge in Shasta County. An autopsy revealed that she was still alive when thrown from the bridge.

== Investigation and trial ==
Following the murder of Selix, an investigation was launched by Shasta County officers, who interviewed Rich. At the time, he was not considered a suspect and was only interviewed because he had previously worked for Selix's mother. A detective interviewed Rich the following day after he had agreed to submit a polygraph test. New information then came about that Rich had shown a friend a body at the same dump where Moore and Slavik had been found. As detectives continued investigating Rich, they concluded he was lying when he denied involvement in the murders. He also failed the polygraph test. Rich spoke to his friends and admitted involvement in one or several of the murders. He had claimed to his girlfriend that he killed Slavik after being paid $7,000 by a biker gang and that he killed Moore because she was "at the wrong place at the wrong time". Some of his friends then spoke to the police and revealed what Rich had told them. Through a friend's written testimony, a murder weapon was found at Rich's mother's house, and Rich eventually confessed to the murder of Selix during a taped interview. He later confessed to all of his crimes.

Rich was convicted of three counts of first degree murder with special circumstances and one count of second degree murder, as well as numerous other non-capital charges. He was sentenced to death for two of the four murders on January 23, 1981.

Rich was briefly married to a woman named Loretta Summers. The two married in January 1981, but their marriage was annulled in August of the same year after Rich was found guilty of the murders.

9th U.S. District Court of Appeals Judge Michael Daly Hawkins, who reviewed Rich's appeal against his death sentence, summarized his crimes:

"The investigation of the crimes leading to Rich's arrest and trial produced substantial public notice in the community where those crimes occurred and understandably so. To even the most hardened eye, the crimes were almost unimaginably brutal—savage attacks on defenseless young women, all sexually ravaged. Five [sic] were also murdered: two bludgeoned to death, a third shot in the face and a fourth—an 11-year-old girl—thrown off a 100-foot bridge to her death. Five other women, ranging in age from 14 to 25, managed to survive; four unhesitatingly identified Rich as their attacker."

== Execution ==
The victims' families were adamantly opposed to any recommendation for clemency for Rich. Selix's aunt said her sister had been haunted by the fact that in her daughter's last moment, her final instinct was to curl in a fetal position, and that she constantly relived the moment in her head. Surviving victims of Rich also opposed clemency. One woman said, "He has taken my ability to live in peace."

Patricia's brother, Burton Adams, said he had only recently learned about the details of his sister's rape and murder and that Rich was getting off easy with a quick death. He spoke at Rich's clemency hearing and said, "I think we should take him to the dump and use a rock. Or maybe a gun—no a gun's too lenient. What he remembers is raping her and killing her. I want you to take that away from him."

Annette's stepfather, David Tidwell, said, "We're wasting time—just kill him. He better pray there's not a life after death—if there is, he better hide."

On March 15, 2000, at 12:06 a.m., Rich was executed via lethal injection in the execution chamber at San Quentin State Prison. He was pronounced dead at 12:13 a.m. He was one of three people executed in the United States on that specific day. The others were Patrick Poland in Arizona and Timothy Gribble in Texas.

Rich declined a last meal and instead only drank beef broth, papaya juice and Gatorade. His final hours were spent with his spiritual advisors and his attorneys. His final statement was the word, "Peace."

Before his execution, Rich, who said he had reformed after discovering his Native American heritage on death row and adopted the name "Young Elk", asked to be allowed to participate in a sweat lodge ceremony, saying it was necessary to purify his spirit. Because the ceremony was supposed to require several hours and involved the use of a rake, hot rocks, and a shovel, the request was denied on the grounds of it being a security risk. Prison authorities additionally stated that sweat lodge ceremonies were not a widespread practice for the Cherokee.

== See also ==
- Capital punishment in California
- Capital punishment in the United States
- List of people executed in California
- List of people executed in the United States in 2000
- List of serial killers in the United States

Preceded by Manuel Pina Babbitt	Executions carried out in California	Succeeded by Robert Lee Massie
