= Jaturun Siripongs =

Thai national executed in California (1955–1999)

- จาตุรันต์ ศิริพงษ์
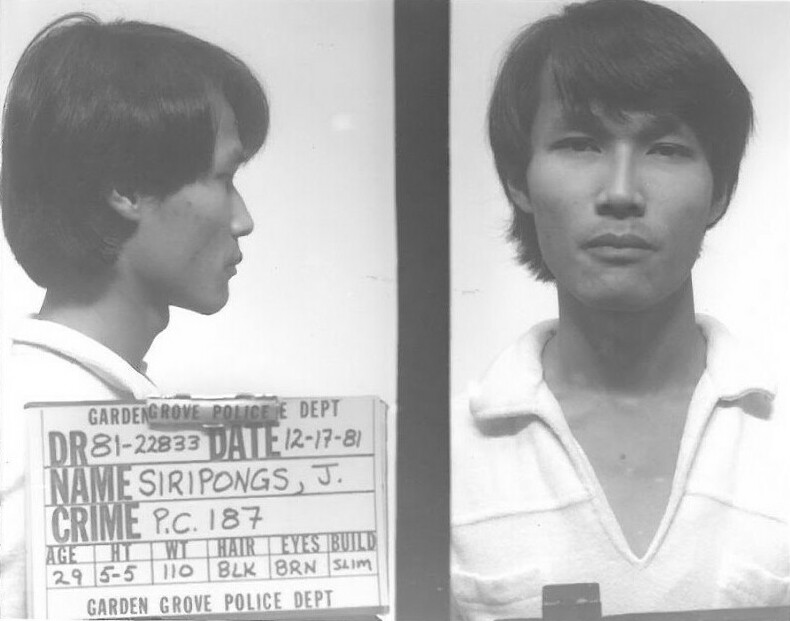
- Siripongs in a 1981 police mugshot
- Born: October 15, 1955; Thailand
- Died: February 9, 1999 (aged 43); San Quentin State Prison, San Quentin, California, U.S.
- Cause of death: Execution by lethal injection
- Other name: Jay Siripongs
- Convictions: First degree murder with special circumstances (2 counts); Robbery; Burglary
- Penalty: Death (April 22, 1983)

Details
- Victims: Packovan “Pat” Wattanaporn, 36; Quach Nguyen, 52
- Date: December 15, 1981
- Country: United States
- State: California
- Weapons: Ligature, kitchen knife
- Date apprehended: December 17, 1981

Jaturun "Jay" Siripongs (Thai: จาตุรันต์ "เจย์" ศิริพงษ์, RTGS: Chaturan Siripong; October 15, 1955 – February 9, 1999) was a Thai national who was executed by the U.S. state of California for the December 1981 murders of Packovan Wattanaporn and Quach Nguyen during a robbery in Garden Grove, California. Siripongs maintained that he was involved in the robbery but was not the actual killer. Ultimately, he was convicted and sentenced to death in 1983 and was subsequently executed in 1999 at San Quentin State Prison by lethal injection.

Siripongs was both the first Asian and the first foreign-born prisoner to be executed in California since the resumption of executions in 1992.

== Early life ==
Siripongs was born in 1955 (Note: Siripongs' age was listed as 20 in 1975, as either 26 or 29 at the time of the murders in 1980, 29 at his conviction in 1983, and as 39 in 1991. The majority of reports gave Siripongs' age at death as 43 in 1999, though the California Department of Corrections and Rehabilitation listed him as aged 47.) in northern Thailand, as one of four children. His father was a wealthy timber merchant and opium dealer who divorced Siripongs' mother when he was an infant. Due to their mother's poverty, Siripongs and his sister were sent to live with an uncle, who ran a brothel out of his home. The house had a rat infestation and also lacked electricity and running water. The siblings served drinks at the brothel's bar and ran errands for the prostitutes and clients. Siripongs and his sister were eventually taken back in by their mother to live in Bangkok. By this point, she had become an alcoholic who physically abused her son while drunk. Relatives stated that Siripongs began misbehaving due to the influence of his friends.

While still in Thailand, Siripongs was convicted twice of robbery. During the latter of the offenses, in 1975, Siripongs was shot in the forehead while burglarizing a department store in Bangkok with his cousin. He was sentenced to 2½ years imprisonment, but released for good behavior after serving one year. Siripongs subsequently joined a Buddhist temple in Bangkok and became a monk for three months; it is common among Thai men to temporarily ordain as monks in their lives. His teacher at the monastery described Siripongs as "among his best students", placing fourth in a class of 38 people. Afterwards, he got a job as a cook on a cargo ship, where an acquaintance offered Siripongs a role in smuggling drugs. Siripongs instead informed US authorities and aided them in a sting operation, for which he was financially compensated. Siripongs used his payment to buy passage into the United States in summer of 1980.

By 1981, Siripongs had taken residence in Hawthorne, California, become employed as an optical grinder and polisher in Irvine, and entered a relationship with Sainampeung "Peung" Vecharungspri, who lived in Cerritos with her mother and several siblings.

== Murders ==
On December 15, 1981, 36-year-old Packovan "Pat" Wattanaporn was managing the Pantai Market, a retail store in Garden Grove, California, owned by her husband Surachai "Jack" Wattanaporn, who was due to return from a business trip that same day. Pat was last seen alive at 10:30 a.m. by customer Suwat Pansanguan, who noted that Pat wore and carried a large amount of jewelry on her person as part of her side business. An employee, 52-year-old Quach Nguyen, a Vietnamese father of four, is assumed to have arrived for his shift around noon. Siripongs was also a part-time employee at the store, having been personally offered the job by the Wattanaporn couple, though he was not on shift.

At 12:15 p.m., Pat's 13-year-old son Vitoon Harusadangkul phoned his mother's store from school, but an unidentified woman answered the call, speaking an unknown Southeast Asian language for a few seconds before audibly dropping the receiver. Vitoon only heard the sound of cars passing by and after calling out for someone on the other end without success, he hung up two minutes into the phone call. At 1:30 p.m., Pansanguan's wife, Deborah Patton, entered the Pantai Market to use the phone after her car broke down, meeting a woman at the counter who stated that she had been waiting for service for the last 30 minutes. Finding the shop's phone on the ground, Patton called Pat's husband Jack, who had returned to work at his import warehouse. Jack, accompanied by Suwat Pansanguan, arrived at 2:00 p.m. and while Jack called the police, Pansanguan searched the store room, where he discovered the bodies of Pat Wattanaporn and Quach Nguyen. Pat had been strangled to death with a nylon cord while Nguyen died from over ten cut and stab wounds to the head and neck.

== Investigation ==
Forensic analysis of the store showed that blood was also present behind the counter and the upstairs bathroom. A cord had been tied to Nguyen's right arm and next to his body, a letter was found, addressed to Netnapa "Noon" Vecharungsri, the 17-year-old sister of Siripongs' girlfriend Peung. Jack Wattanaporn told officers of Siripongs as a suspect since he had a criminal record in Thailand.

Siripongs arrived at the Vecharungspri siblings' residence at 3:00 p.m. and while he visited on a daily basis to see his girlfriend, he usually did not arrive until 4 or 5 p.m. Siripongs had bandaged fingers, which he excused as the result of a workplace accident, despite the fact that a day earlier, he had instructed Noon to call in sick at his workplace for December 15 on his behalf. Siripongs asked for Peung's brother to clean the floormats of his car before calling a friend, Chusit Petsuksomvilai, whom he asked to sell some jewelry he had, claiming it belonged to a fellow Thai immigrant named Sang, who was facing deportation within a week and needed money. Siripongs estimated the value at $4,000 (equivalent to $14,165 in 2025) and offered a quarter of the sales profit to pay an outstanding $1,000 debt to Petsuksomvilai.

On December 16, police found Pat Wattanaporn's bag, containing a purse and a wallet, in a dumpster at a shopping mall in Cerritos. A more exhaustive search found a shirt, a pair of pants, a pair of shoes and a paper towel, all stained with blood, a bandana, a pair of socks, a jacket, two lengths of cord, a bandage wrapper and two serrated knives, as well as three envelopes and a bank deposit check from the Pantai Market. Hair found on some of the clothes and one of the knives was similar to that of Pat Wattanaporn while the cords were found to be the same as the one found around Quach Nguyen's arm. The shoes were a match for Siripongs' size while the jacket belonged to Noon Vecharungspri, though she later reported that she had not seen the jacket since that year's Thanksgiving after leaving it at Siripongs' residence, but acknowledging that she had left the letter found at the crime scene in the jacket's pockets. Siripongs frequented a laundry at the mall where the items were found and owned a set of kitchen knives, which were the same brand as one of the knives found in the dumpster.

On December 17, Siripongs returned to work, this time claiming that the cuts on his hands were from a physical struggle with Noon Vecharungspri, saying she had attempted suicide with a knife, which she later denied. In the afternoon, Siripongs went to two department stores, where he attempted to make purchases with one of the Wattanaporns' credit cards. Siripongs left the first establishment upon being asked for identification, but at the second shop, the clerk contacted the credit card company, who confirmed that the card had been stolen during a murder two days earlier. Store security detained Siripongs, who provided a false name and address while they waited in a staff room for police to arrive. With Siripongs' agreement, an officer of the Westminster Police Department searched his wallet, which contained a gold chain. Afterwards, he was taken into custody by Garden Grove Police Department on suspicion of receiving stolen property.

At Garden Grove police station, blood and hair samples were taken from Siripongs. A request for an attorney was ignored and he was not read his Miranda rights. Siripongs used one of his two allowed phone calls to speak to the Vecharungspri family, whom he told that he was arrested for using a borrowed credit card. He asked Peung and Noon to go to his house and remove various items from his home, including his car keys, a camera case, a Buddha statue, a sugar jar, a number of Christmas presents he bought for them, and an unspecified document, as well as ask his friend Chusit Petsuksomvilai for money. The sisters agreed, but they were not allowed to leave the house by their mother as it was already nighttime. The call was recorded on audio devices carried by on-station officers and translated from Thai by Jack Wattanaporn and Suwat Pansanguan.

On December 18, police searched Siripongs' residence with a search warrant. The camera case, the statue, and the jar were found to contain several pieces of jewelry, which, with the exception of a single gold chain, were identified as belonging to Pat Wattanaporn and had a total worth of $20,000 (equivalent to $70,827 in 2025) to $50,000 (equivalent to $177,068 in 2025). A box in the bedroom contained receipts for the Christmas presents, purchased in Pat's name after her death. A piece of paper had Pat's name written on it repeatedly, apparently attempting to copy her signature. A search of Siripongs' car found a bag with documents from the Pantai Market and a gold watch belonging to Pat. Bloodstains found at the crime scene and the bloodied clothes found in Cerritos matched Siripongs' blood type. Separately, Siripongs called Petsuksomvilai from jail, telling him that he was arrested for the murders in Garden Grove, but denying involvement. He also denied that the jewelry given to Petsuksomvilai was stolen, instead instructing him to contact Noon, claiming she knew where to find Sang and return the jewelry. Petsuksomvilai called Noon, but she said that she knew no one named Sang.

== Legal process and imprisonment ==
On February 11, 1983, the Orange County, California Superior Court in Santa Ana convicted Siripongs of burglary, robbery, and two counts of first-degree murder following a one-month trial. On April 22, an Orange County jury sentenced him to death. Siripongs' main legal counsel became Linda Schilling, who compiled Siripongs' childhood in Thailand as part of his appeals.

Siripongs admitted that he took part in the robbery but always claimed the murders were committed by an accomplice, who had inflicted Siripongs' hand injuries when he tried to stop the accomplice. His original attorney, James Spellman had not provided evidence for the claim during the original trial and Siripongs refused to name the accomplice, citing fears of endangering his family. In an affidavit during his appeals process, professor of anthropology and Thai culture Herbert Phillips wrote that Siripongs' silence was additionally tied to cultural beliefs in face and the idea that Siripongs had lost his soul, which he could only regain in after death by facing punishment for his participation in the robbery. The court rejected this explanation, stating that Siripongs had adopted "Americanized" values and was no longer a practicing Buddhist.

His defense attorneys suggested that the accomplice was an unidentified man suspected of murder in Thailand. As part of Siripongs' final appeals before his execution in February 1999, attorney Michael Laurence argued that Siripongs had only acted as a lookout and that the actual robber was Noon Vecharungsri, the sister of his girlfriend, who was a key witness at his trial, but had since returned to Thailand, with her exact whereabouts unknown. Laurence claimed that prosecutors had indicated suspicion of Noon's involvement, but chosen to focus on Siripongs' conviction to ensure a guilty verdict. Orange County deputy attorney general Laura Whitcomb Halgren stated that Noon may have been present during the robbery, though an investigator specified that the suspicion considered her a potential "wheel person" rather than a murder suspect. In December 1995, a federal judge conducted an eight-day hearing and found no evidence that supported the idea of Siripongs having an accomplice.

Throughout his incarceration, Siripongs was considered a model inmate, noted for his devotion to Buddhist traditions and artistic pursuits. By the time of his execution, he had acknowledged guilt for his actions, but still insisted an accomplice had committed the actual murders. Shortly before his execution, 22 paintings donated by Siripongs were displayed at the YWCA Building in Oakland, as part of the Visions of Life: Art Out of Death Row exhibit. Siripongs believed in reincarnation, and requested to be cremated to have his ashes scattered at sea, reasoning that his remains would be consumed by fish, which would then be eaten by humans. In the final days of his life, his spiritual advisor was Ajahn Pasanno, who wrote about his experiences with Siripongs in the 2003 memoir The Last Breath, which also features some of Siripongs' prison writings. Shortly before his first scheduled execution date, Thailand offered to take custody of Siripongs and have him serve life in prison in his homecountry.

== Execution ==
=== Appeals process ===
Several appeals were made to prevent the execution, including by Siripongs' sister, Jack Wattanaporn, two of the jurors at Siripongs' original trial, Bishop of Sacramento William Weigand, Pope John Paul II, Ambassador of Thailand to the United States Nitya Pibulsonggram and former San Quentin Prison warden Daniel Vasquez, the latter of whom, despite attempting to spare Siripongs life, was a supporter of capital punishment. The two jurors, Sylvia Twomey and Sandra Ferguson, provided signed statements claiming that the jury all had doubts that Siripongs acted alone, and some only voted in favor of the death penalty because they did not want "an immigrant wrongfully taxing the American system" if he served a life sentence instead. Twomey also claimed that she felt pressured to provide a quick sentencing because her boss was reluctant to keep her on paid leave.

Thailand also requested a commutation and repeated their offer to repatriate Siripongs for a life sentence. Many religious organizations in the United States and Thailand, including Buddhists, Catholics, and Quakers, were also in favor of life imprisonment, with Meditation Center for the Young Buddhist Association director Thongkham Sriyothin stating in court, "For Jaturun, the severest punishment is not death, but a life lived entirely in prison, forever contemplating the shame and pain he has brought to others".

Siripongs was initially scheduled for execution in November 17, 1998. An appeal for clemency to Governor Pete Wilson was denied. but six hours before the execution, US District Judge Maxine M. Chesney blocked the execution. By this point, he had already eaten a last meal of sliced papaya, grapes, bitter melon soup, an assortment of dim sum, including pork buns, strawberry sherbet, and six cans of Pepsi. Siripongs was described as appearing visibly happy while being escorted back to death row, with his attorney Linda Schilling stating that her client was "thankful and grateful to be alive". Siripongs appeared before the federal judge on December 4, but an extension to his stay of execution was denied. On December 14, 1998, an Orange County Superior Court Judge signed a new execution order for Siripongs, setting an execution date for February 9, 1999.

Newly appointed Governor Gray Davis denied Siripongs clemency and rejected the Thai government's offer to take Siripongs back. He stated "Model behavior cannot bring back the lives of the two innocent murder victims." Davis cited the support of the punishment by former Orange County deputy district attorney Jim Tanizaki, who handled the murder case, and Pat Wattanaporn's firstborn children, Vitoon and Vipa Mary Harisdangkul, who stood in conflict with their stepfather and half-brother. A final appeal was denied on February 4, 1999.

=== Death ===
On February 9, 1999, Siripongs was executed by lethal injection. His last meal consisted of two cans of Lucky Arctic iced tea and two cups of Mission Pride canned peaches. He had no last words. The execution began at 12:04 a.m., with Siripongs pronounced dead at 12:19 a.m. Outside San Quentin State Prison on the night of his execution, anti-death penalty advocates clashed with death penalty supporters. Punches were thrown, causing Marin County police to separate the two groups.

== See also ==
- Capital punishment in California
- List of people executed in California
- List of people executed in the United States in 1999
- Theerasak Longji

== Notes ==
Preceded by Thomas Martin Thompson	Executions carried out in California	Succeeded by Manuel Pina Babbitt
