= Donald Beardslee =

American murderer (1943–2005)

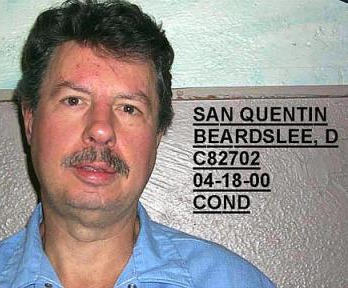
- Born: Donald Jay Beardslee; May 13, 1943; St. Louis, Missouri, U.S.
- Died: January 19, 2005 (aged 61); San Quentin State Prison, San Quentin, California, U.S.
- Cause of death: Execution by lethal injection
- Spouse: Karen Beardslee (Hansen) (1966–1967)
- Convictions: Missouri; Second degree murder California; First degree murder with special circumstances (2 counts)
- Penalty: Missouri; 19 years imprisonment California; Death

Details
- Victims: 3
- Span of crimes: 1969–1981
- Country: United States
- States: Missouri; California
Donald Beardslee
- Military career
- Branch: United States Air Force
- Service years: 1962–1966
- Rank: Airman

Donald Jay Beardslee (May 13, 1943 – January 19, 2005) was an American murderer who killed three women. While on parole for killing a woman in Missouri in 1969, Beardslee murdered two more women in California. He was sentenced to death and executed by lethal injection in San Quentin State Prison in 2005.

== Early life ==
Born in St. Louis, Missouri in 1943, Beardslee was the oldest of three children. His father died when he was 11. He was sent to Western Military Academy in Alton, Illinois, a military school, at age 15 and later attended Southwest High School in Saint Louis, where he graduated from in June 1962. In August 1962, he then joined the U.S. Air Force at 19, where he served for four years as an aircraft mechanic. He and another airman were caught trying to steal a vehicle in 1965. He was sentenced to a work farm in Minnesota where he was hit by a falling tree and suffered a head fracture and a days-long coma.

== Criminal career ==
In 1969 in Missouri, he choked, stabbed and drowned Laura Griffin, whom he had just met. The two met in a bar, and, after drinking and dancing with her, Beardslee went home with her. He turned himself in and confessed to the killing. Beardslee pleaded guilty to second degree murder, received a 19-year sentence, and served seven years before being released on parole in 1977. No motive was established nor did he offer any explanation.

Beardslee attended the College of San Mateo while on parole.

Four years after leaving prison, while he was still on parole, Beardslee was arrested in California for the April 5, 1981, drug-related homicides of 19-year-old Patty Geddling and 23-year-old Stacie Benjamin in Redwood City, California. Prosecutors claim a drug deal between the friends of Beardslee's roommate had gone wrong, and a $185 drug debt had gone unpaid. In a scheme devised by Frank Rutherford, a drug dealer, Beardslee's roommate, Ricarda Sue (Rickie) Soria, lured the two to their apartment. The prosecutors noted that Beardslee sent Soria out to get duct tape to bind the victims before they arrived. Beardslee and, according to the prosecution, Bill Forrester, both shot Geddling, and later Beardslee slashed Benjamin's throat.

Beardslee's phone number was found near Geddling's body and when police called he confessed and led them to Benjamin's body. At the time of this offense, he was still on parole for the 1969 Missouri killing which made him eligible for a death sentence as a repeat offender. Rutherford was sentenced to life without parole and died there in 2003. Soria pleaded no contest to second degree murder in exchange for testimony against Rutherford and Beardslee, and was sentenced to 15 years to life. She was paroled in 2015. Bill Forrester was acquitted and charges against a fifth person were dropped before trial. Beardslee was convicted of first-degree murder and sentenced to death.

The defense tried to appeal on the grounds of inadequate defense since the original lawyer quit the case, and on grounds of mental defect due to a head injury from a falling tree in the Minnesota work farm accident when he was 21. Prosecutors noted that he was of above average intelligence although family members testified he had lifelong trouble expressing emotion and prison records indicate diagnoses of schizophrenia.

== Execution ==
Beardslee was executed on January 19, 2005. He was the first prisoner to be executed in California since Governor Arnold Schwarzenegger took office. Beardslee had no final words. Schwarzenegger denied clemency to Beardslee, stating that "we are not dealing here with a man who is so generally affected by his impairment that he cannot tell the difference between right and wrong."

== See also ==
- Capital punishment in California
- Capital punishment in the United States
- List of people executed in California
- List of people executed in the United States in 2005
- List of serial killers in the United States

Preceded by Stephen Wayne Anderson	Executions carried out in California	Succeeded by Stanley Tookie Williams
