= William Bonin =

American serial killer and rapist (1947–1996)

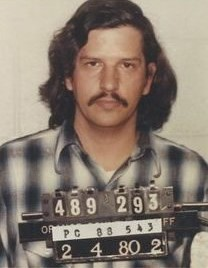
- Bonin's 1980 mug shot
- Born: January 8, 1947; Willimantic, Connecticut, U.S.
- Died: February 23, 1996 (aged 49); San Quentin State Prison, California, U.S.
- Other names: The Freeway Killer; The Freeway Strangler
- Children: 1
- Status: Executed by lethal injection
- Convictions: First degree murder with special circumstances (14 counts); Robbery (3 counts); Sodomy
- Penalty: Los Angeles County; Death (March 12, 1982); Orange County; Death (August 26, 1983)

Details
- Victims: 14 convicted 21 confessed 22–36+ suspected
- Span of crimes: November 17, 1968 – June 2, 1980
- Country: United States
- State: California
- Date apprehended: June 11, 1980
- Imprisoned at: San Quentin State Prison

William George Bonin (January 8, 1947 – February 23, 1996), also called the Freeway Killer and the Freeway Strangler, was an American serial killer and sex offender. Bonin attacked numerous boys and men between 1968 and 1980, in southern California, and briefly, Vietnam. He was convicted of 14 murders, but confessed to 21, and is a suspect in additional cases.

Born in Connecticut, Bonin moved to California as a child. He fought in the Vietnam War in 1967 and 1968. Returning to California, he was held at prison psychiatric facilities from 1969 to 1974. His first known murder was in May 1979.

Bonin's typical modus operandi in murdering was luring victims into his van by offering them sex, before binding, torturing, raping, then strangling or stabbing them. He would drive their bodies to other counties in California to obscure his movements, leaving them beside freeways. The crime scenes pointed to a gay male perpetrator, which led gay rights activists to put up a $50,000 reward for information leading to his conviction. Bonin was often aided in his murders by one of four known accomplices. Prosecutors accused Vernon Butts of partaking in twelve murders; he died before his trial.

Bonin was caught by police raping a boy in June 1980, which led to him being tied to the murders. His defense in his first trial argued that child abuse had made Bonin insane, and thus not responsible for his actions; the prosecution labeled him "the most arch-evil person who ever existed", but not legally insane. Bonin was convicted in both of his trials. He spent 14 years on death row, during which he spoke against capital punishment, and maintained his trial lawyer's insanity defense. In 1996, at San Quentin State Prison, Bonin became the first person to be executed via lethal injection in California.

== Early life ==
William George Bonin was born in Willimantic, Connecticut, on January 8, 1947, the second of three sons to Robert Leonard Bonin Sr., a World War II veteran, and Alice Dorothy Cote. Both parents were alcoholics. His father physically abused his wife and children, while his mother had severe mood swings, and frequented a bingo parlor while her sons remained unattended. His older brother, Robert Jr., received the brunt of their father's abuse. Bonin's mother often left the children with their maternal grandfather, Edmond Cote. Edmond was a known child molester who had sexually abused Bonin's mother. She later speculated her father molested his grandsons. Bonin and his younger brother Paul were also left with Robert Jr., who belittled and beat them.

In January 1950, Bonin's father gambled away the family home in Andover, Connecticut, forcing them to move in with Bonin's maternal grandmother, Bertha Florence Cote, in Willimantic. Bonin and his brothers were actively raised Catholic. They attended St. Mary's Catholic School, where staff complained that Bonin was misbehaving, being truant, and aggressive toward other students. Once, after riding his bike into a group of young girls, he was briefly placed in juvenile hall; after returning home, he was reportedly more uncooperative toward his parents than before.

In September 1953, Bonin began attending the Franco-American School, a Catholic convent in Lowell, Massachusetts. The convent enforced harsh discipline by staff, with extreme assault being commonplace. Bonin recalled nuns forcing him to punch a fence when he misbehaved. Records indicate he was observed to function well in this structured environment. According to witnesses, Bonin was bullied, and once, sexually assaulted by an older boy in 1955. According to Bonin, in the latter incident the older boy approached Bonin for sex, and Bonin asked the boy to tie his hands behind his back, so he could feel "secure and less frightened". The boy used Bonin's binding to sexually assault him. During this time at the convent, neither parent visited Bonin or his brother, and Bonin became worried they had died.

Bonin was to remain at the convent until May 1955, when he returned to live with his parents in a home owned by Bonin's maternal grandfather in Mansfield. There, Bonin attended Annie Vinton Elementary School, where he was bullied. He became a juvenile delinquent who quarreled with students. He recalled being sexually attracted to younger children and male teachers at that time, and feeling shame from it. Neighbors later failed to recollect his parents spending time with Bonin and Paul, and one worried neighbor provided them meals and clean clothes out of concern.

Largely devoid of consequences and parental supervision, Bonin stole hubcaps and license plates off vehicles around town. In 1957 he was placed in a juvenile detention center for these and other petty crimes. While incarcerated, Bonin was molested by an adult counselor. (Note: Contemporary records from this juvenile detention center indicate Bonin also functioned well under the disciplinary structure of the detention home.) Following his release, he began groping his younger brother Paul; after six months, Paul informed their mother of this and Bonin was forced to sleep in a separate bedroom. Bonin later confessed to molesting young boys and exposing himself to a 10-year-old girl during this time.

In 1959, Bonin attended a middle school in Coventry, Connecticut. He showed skills in math and science, but had otherwise mediocre grades. In late 1960, his family faced foreclosure, and Bonin's mother kicked his father out of the home, then won custody of the siblings. The parents reconciled, however, after their father was offered lucrative employment as a machinist in Downey, California. In early 1962, they purchased a tract home in nearby Torrance.

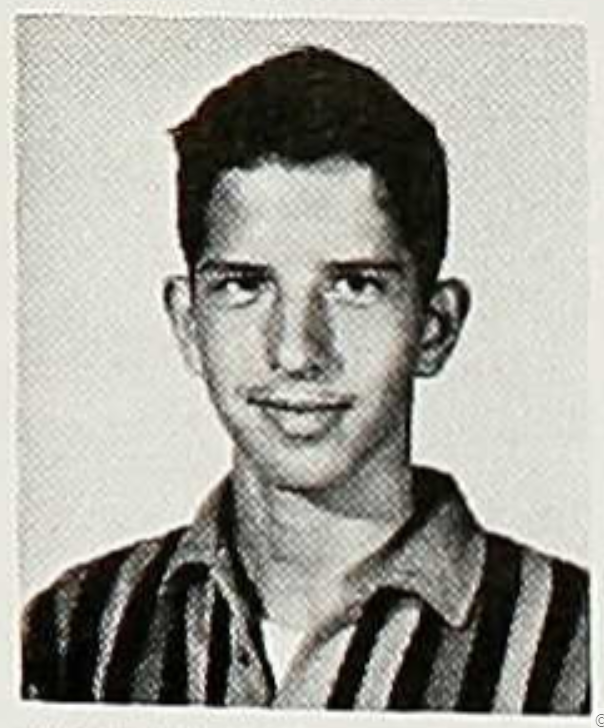
Bonin in his North High School yearbook photo, c. 1963

Paul later recalled Bonin as a well-behaved teenager. Bonin attended North High School in Torrance, where he was an outcast. He was uncomfortable around his peers, and is not known to have any friends in this time. By his teenage years, Bonin had increasing pedophilic urges, but kept this a secret. His mother was aware, and this led to frequent arguments between them. Bonin rarely interacted with girls, but once reluctantly dated a girl named Linda to please his mother. After dropping out of high school in 1966, Bonin molested several neighborhood children. His mother reportedly refused to acknowledge these acts, or his escalating antisocial behavior, but frequently worried he would be arrested, to his frustration. Eventually, she evicted him from their house, for undisclosed reasons. Bonin lacked motivation in his daily life, and frequently borrowed money from his parents. With his mother's encouragement, he joined the U.S. Air Force in December 1966. He also became engaged to Linda, a decision largely made by Bonin's mother, who felt it would quell his attraction to pubescent boys. During the engagement, he repeatedly told Linda that he had recurring nightmares depicting the sexual assault and murder of a woman.

== 1967–1968: Service in Vietnam ==
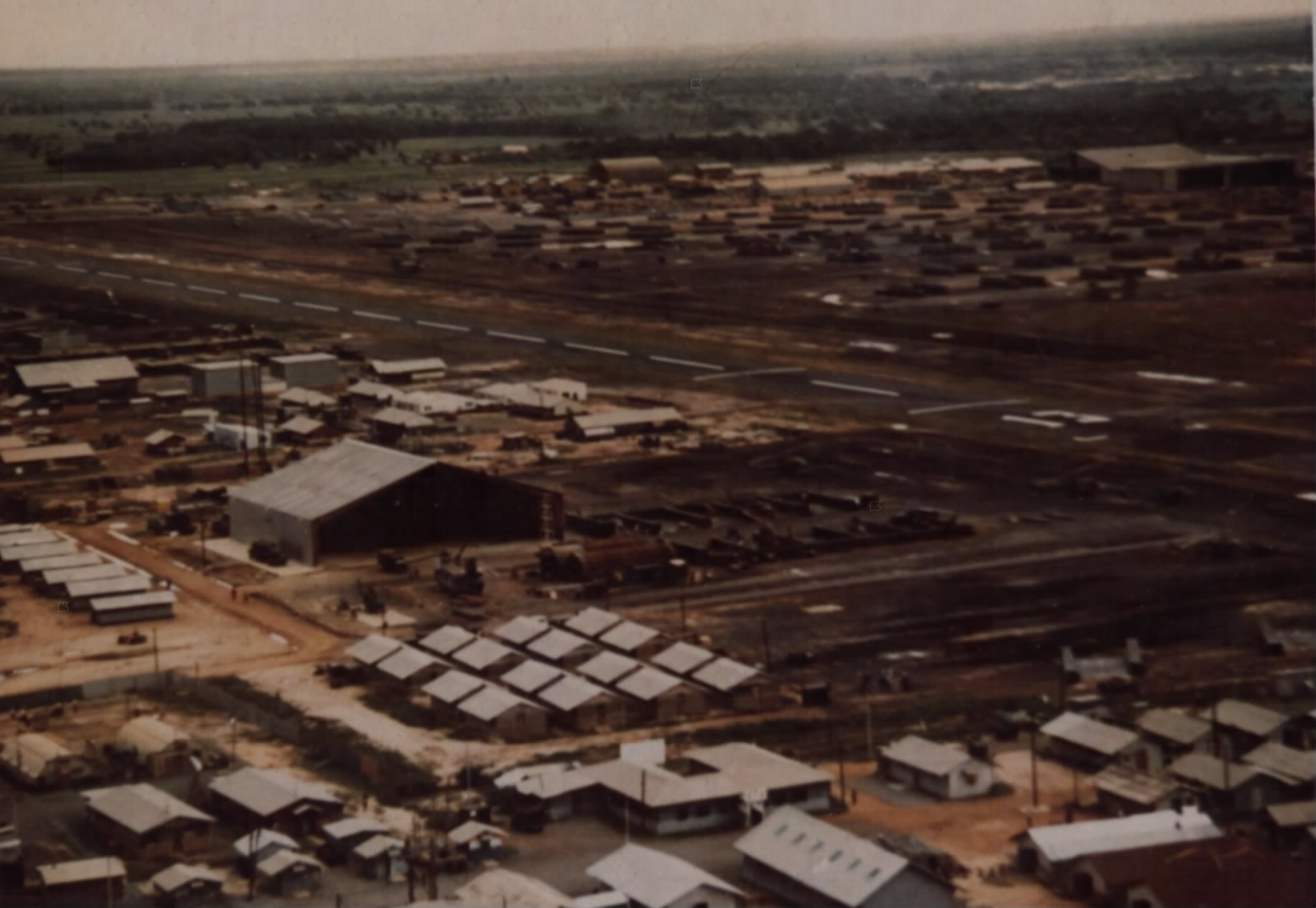
Phu Loi Base Camp, where Bonin was stationed in the Vietnam War

During his military service, Bonin completed a General Equivalency Diploma, and served as a cook for four months in Alaska. He was arrested for theft on October 25, 1967, but the charges were dropped due to his imminent deployment to Vietnam, amidst the Vietnam War. Stationed in Phu Loi Base Camp, he served five months of active duty in the 205th Assault Support Helicopter Unit as an aerial gunner, logging over 700 hours of combat and patrol time. He is known to have risked his own life on one occasion while under enemy fire to save a wounded fellow airman. For this act, Bonin received a medal in recognition of his gallantry, among other medals. Bonin later claimed that he had consensual sex with women and men in Vietnam, and once, a man in Hong Kong. He also later confessed to sexually assaulting two soldiers under his command at gunpoint, around the 1968 Tet Offensive. Bonin later claimed that his wartime experiences instilled misanthropic beliefs. Bonin served nearly three years, before receiving an honorable discharge on October 25, 1968, at age 21.

== 1968–1969: Life after the military ==
Upon returning home, he discovered that Linda, who had given birth to their son, had left him to marry another man. This reportedly left him extremely frustrated. Bonin returned to Downey to live with his parents, whom he resented for frequently requesting his help. He found work as a gas station attendant. Several family members noted differences in his behavior after his military service, although Bonin refused to explain these changes.

On November 17, 1968, Bonin picked up 14-year-old Billy Jones in Arcadia, California, while driving his mother's car. In response to Bonin repeatedly asking him questions about homosexuality, Jones attempted to flee the vehicle, but failed. Bonin drove him to a shopping center, then handcuffed, beat, and raped him. He then left Jones at a park. Returning home, Jones told his mother what had happened, and she promptly reported Bonin to police.

On November 26, Bonin picked up 17-year-old hitchhiker John Treadwell of Torrance. Bonin began asking him about "fags" and homosexuality before accelerating the vehicle and producing a handgun. Bonin parked in a secluded area. He then raped Treadwell, and bludgeoned him with a tire iron. Bonin threatened to harm Treadwell if he notified authorities.

On December 4, it was reported to the Torrance Police Department by 17-year-old Allen Pruitt that a man with medium-length dark hair and olive complexion had offered him a ride before deviating from the highway and handcuffing the boy, who was extensively sexually assaulted in the vehicle.

On January 1, 1969, Bonin offered a ride to 12-year-old Lawrence Brettman in Hermosa Beach. Ignoring the boy's pleas to let him go, Bonin began threatening him. Bonin parked and forced Brettman to have sex with him, then robbed him at gun point. As he did with Treadwell, Bonin threatened to kill him if he notified authorities.

On January 12, Bonin reportedly picked up 18-year-old hitchhiker Jesus Monge, then offered him sex. When Monge attempted to exit the vehicle, Bonin assaulted, handcuffed, and raped him. By this point, extensive efforts were being made by local police to locate a potential serial rapist that fit Bonin's description. On the 28th, a policewoman in El Segundo spotted him driving around in his mother's vehicle with a visibly frightened boy, 16-year-old runaway Timothy Wilson. Noting Bonin's frantic state, and matching description to the rapist, she arrested him. Regarding the aforementioned incidents since November, he was indicted on five counts of kidnapping, four counts of sodomy, one count of oral copulation, and one count of child molestation.

In March 1969, Bonin underwent two psychiatric examinations, after which he was determined as being a sexual psychopath, who had little control over his impulses and showed signs of depression and inappropriate emotional responses. Initially denying childhood abuse, Bonin confessed to being molested at age eight and suspected he was molested on various occasions between 9 and 12 years old. In May, Bonin recounted to a probation officer his recent stressful separation and admitted his guilt in molesting male youths, although he also expressed desire to start a family and become a pilot upon his release. He said that his Vietnam service contributed to his criminal behavior, emphasizing his difficulties in seducing female partners since his return. He was evaluated to be "seriously lacking insight and responsibility" for crimes committed since his childhood. He pleaded guilty to molestation and forced oral copulation, and was sentenced to the Atascadero State Hospital in June 1969 as a mentally disordered sex offender considered amenable to treatment.

== 1969–1974: Incarceration in Atascadero and Vacaville ==
Bonin arrived at the Atascadero State Hospital on June 17, 1969. There, he was subjected to a battery of psychiatric examinations which revealed that he possessed an IQ of 121 and displayed traits of manic depression, sexual sadism disorder, and antisocial personality disorder. A physical examination revealed extensive scars on Bonin's head and buttocks, which he claimed to have no memory of obtaining, but were likely sustained in the Franco-American Orphanage. This lack of acknowledgement led experts to conclude Bonin repressed memories of the more extreme aspects of his childhood abuse. They also noted the psychological and emotional implications of Bonin's relationship with his mother, upon whom he remained emotionally dependent, in spite of her low opinion of him (she considered him "worthless as a human being").

Bonin regularly attended group therapy sessions while incarcerated. Psychiatrists noted his defensive, aggressive attitude toward other patients, and his refusal to acknowledge his homosexuality. (Note: Contemporary records reveal Bonin fainted "dead away for ten minutes" from stress related to acknowledging his sexual orientation during his first interview at the Atascadero hospital.) Bonin divulged his intentions to eliminate any future victims of his sexual assaults, if he deemed it necessary. He was classified as an extreme sociopath with a high probability of recidivistic behavior under periods of psychotic breakdown. He was regarded as "extremely disturbed" and his poor social skills with others were also viewed as hindering his own treatment. Despite this, Bonin willingly participated in experimental programs and was generally considered a non-violent, helpful, and conscientious patient by staff. He had recited what he perceived psychiatrists desired to hear from him, believing he could manipulate them into granting him an early release. One psychiatrist wrote of Bonin that he "wanted to straighten himself out, but doesn't know how to go about it."

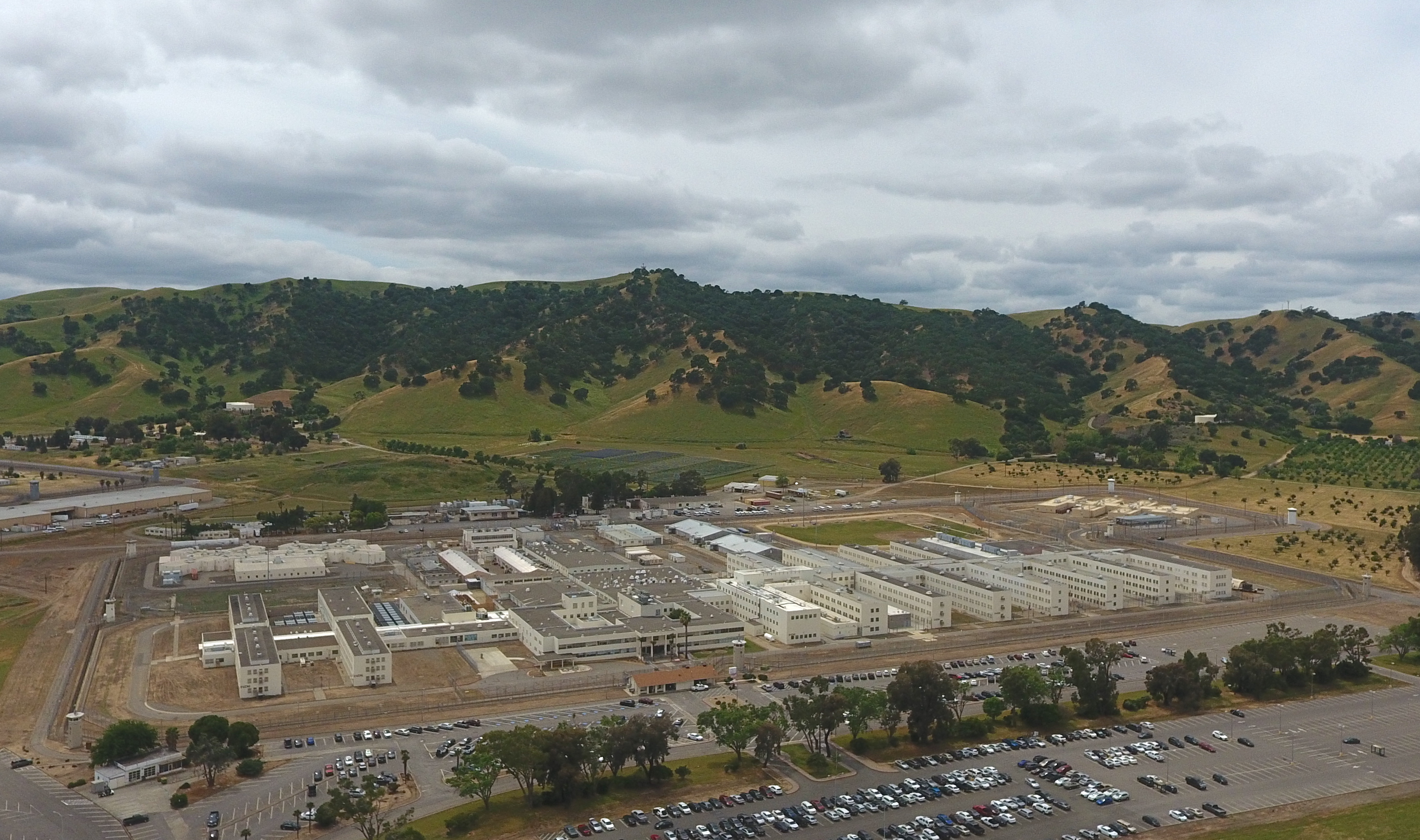
The California Medical Facility, where Bonin was sent in 1971

In 1971, Bonin was sent to the California Medical Facility, having been declared unsuitable for further treatment due to repeated sexual engagement with inmates (two of whom were mentally challenged). For this, and irritating fellow patients, Bonin was beaten on several occasions. He was subject to further psychiatric examination, which dealt with hostility toward his father and older brother. It was noted that his sexual behaviors were compulsive in response to stress. He also sought to raise money for the family of another prisoner and reportedly applied willingly for at least one treatment program. Bonin was released from prison on June 11, 1974, after doctors concluded he was "no longer a danger to the health and safety of others".

== 1974–1978: Life after incarceration ==
In Los Angeles in July 1974, Bonin rented an apartment in Hollywood to get involved in the local gay community, but was largely unsuccessful due to poor social skills. He soon relocated to his parents' new house in Downey. He briefly worked as a bartender in Fountain Valley, and then became a truck driver for a Montebello delivery firm named Dependable Drive-Away in December 1974. He was fired from the job in February 1975 for wrecking a trailer. In March 1975, Bonin attended community college for two semesters. Around this time, he would pick up hitchhikers, intending to have sex with them.

While driving around on the night of September 8, 1975, he encountered 14-year-old David McVicker hitchhiking in Garden Grove. McVicker accepted Bonin's offer to drive him to his parents' home in Huntington Beach. Shortly after McVicker entered the car, Bonin asked him if he had had gay sex, to which McVicker replied no. McVicker asked to leave the vehicle, which prompted Bonin to accelerate it. When McVicker attempted to leave, Bonin produced a gun and drove him to a deserted field. Bonin ordered him to undress, then beat and raped him. Bonin started strangling him, and McVicker pleaded for his life; Bonin immediately stopped and apologized, before reverting to casual conversation. (Note: This event would hold significance as being the last incident in which Bonin is known to have expressed any semblance of remorse or guilt for his actions.) He then drove McVicker to his home, stating: "You know what? You're an alright guy. I was going to kill you, but I want to come back for you and use you again." McVicker then phoned his mother, who reported the incident to Garden Grove police.

Two days after assaulting McVicker, Bonin attempted to abduct a 15-year-old boy. The boy had entered Bonin's van, but rejected Bonin's offer for sex before exiting the van onto a sidewalk. Bonin then drove the van onto the sidewalk, attempting to hit him. On October 11, 1975, Bonin was arrested for the two previous assaults. Upon arrest, he informed law enforcement that "next time, there won't be any more witnesses." He was charged with the rape and forcible oral copulation of a minor (McVicker), and attempted abduction (the second boy).

Bonin pleaded guilty to both charges and on December 31, 1975, he was sentenced to serve one to fifteen years at the California Men's Facility in San Luis Obispo. (Note: Although Bonin denied any culpability of this conviction to fellow inmates, as a convicted child molester, he was beaten on several occasions while incarcerated for this offense.) In 1977, Bonin was subject to further psychiatric examination. It was theorized that his sexual involvement with young boys stemmed from his mother's treatment of him. In March 1978, Bonin's father suffered a major stroke, presumably caused by alcoholism, and was hospitalized. In prison, Bonin completed mathematics courses and training as a machinist in order to secure employment. He also showed significant progress in individual therapy sessions. As a result, he was released on October 11, with eighteen months' supervised probation.

== 1978–1979: Life after release ==
On November 1, 1978, Bonin moved to an apartment in the Kingswood Village complex, located approximately one mile from his parents' house. He soon became acquainted with his 43-year-old neighbor, Everett Scott Fraser. Bonin became a regular attendee at Fraser's parties, where young men, drugs, and alcohol were present. Fraser considered him a respectful person, and the two also talked about their homosexuality. In December, Bonin established a relationship with a married mother who held a criminal record for child cruelty. He would take trips to Anaheim with her and her kids.

In April 1979, Bonin's parole supervision concluded. Later, Bonin and his brother Paul relocated to Silverado, and ran a bar called the Alpine Inn. It was continually under scrutiny for noise violations. An incident occurred involving Bonin reportedly locking a 16-year-old runaway in a room of the building, threatening at knife-point to bury his body in the hills. Unable to obtain a permanent liquor license due to Bonin's criminal record, the business venture was short-lived. Later, Bonin purchased a Ford Econoline van while working at his older brother's plumbing business.

=== Meeting Vernon Butts and Gregory Miley ===
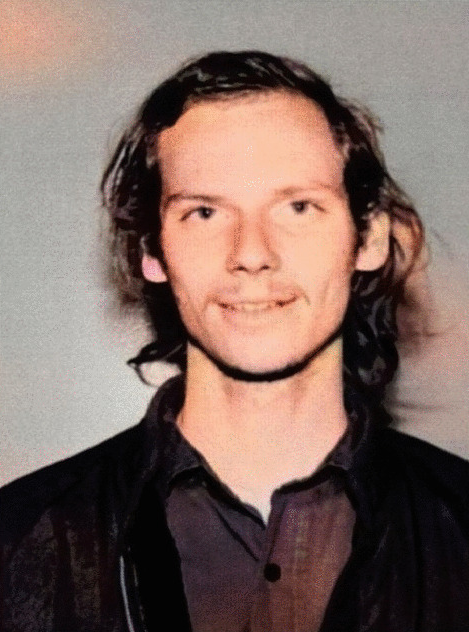
Vernon Butts

Through his frequent attendance at Fraser's parties, Bonin became acquainted with 21-year-old Vernon Robert Butts, and 18-year-old Gregory Matthews Miley. Raised in Norwalk, Butts was nine years old when his father died, and reportedly hailed from a broken home. Described by acquaintances as "shy and easily led" by others, Butts attempted suicide on three occasions prior to meeting Bonin. Butts frequently abused drugs and alcohol. By then, he was a vagrant, and had been imprisoned for burglary and arson. Butts claimed to have been both enamored with and terrified of Bonin, claiming he had a "kind of hypnotic" control over him. In contrast, Bonin respected Butts' popularity, dominance, and intelligence. Bonin later recalled: "He had it all together. Everybody liked him; it was cool having him like me... made me feel real important. I never had no friends." The two soon started a relationship. Meanwhile, Bonin had a sexual relationship with Miley. Raised in Lakewood, California, Miley was severely neglected by his mother, who reportedly had a series of dysfunctional marriages. He was illiterate, and had dropped out of high school.

== 1979–1980: Murders ==
When Bonin murdered numerous men and boys in 1979 and 1980, he usually selected young male hitchhikers, schoolboys, and male prostitutes as his victims. Aged 12 to 19, they were predominantly Caucasian or Latino, slender, pale, and long-haired. He either enticed or forced them into his Ford van, where they were overpowered, then bound with handcuffs, wires, cords, or a mix of those. Bonin then sexually assaulted, beat, and tortured the victims, before typically killing them by strangling them with their own T-shirts and a tire iron. In order to minimize their chances of escaping from the van, Bonin removed the handles from the passenger-side front and rear doors. He stowed knives, pliers, ligatures, wire coat hangers, and similar instruments in his vehicle to restrain and torture them. They were usually killed inside his van, before their bodies were discarded near freeways. In an apparent effort to mislead investigators, Bonin often discarded them in counties far from their abduction.

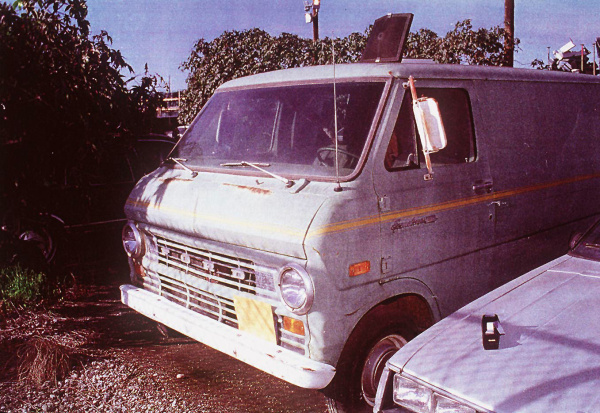
The Ford Econoline van used by Bonin to abduct his victims

Bonin typically cruised the freeways on Fridays and Saturdays. In a minimum of twelve of the murders, he was assisted by one or more of his four known accomplices. Bonin later confessed that he felt a sense of social belonging with his accomplices that never occurred with anyone else. Butts is suspected of witnessing or assisting in at least nine murders. Bonin would boast to him and Fraser about newspaper reports of the murders, and put clippings of them in a scrapbook. (Note: Bonin would later claim he murdered Markus Grabs in self-defense to Fraser.) To those unaware of Bonin's crimes, like his co-workers at Dependable Drive-Away, he seemed obsessed with the case. He would also tell people, "this guy is giving good gays like us a bad name."

During the murder period, Dr. Albert Rosenstein, a forensic psychologist, predicted the unknown killer was an intelligent sex offender in his late twenties or early thirties, who had spent time in a psychiatric facility and was abused as a child. He said that, while bisexual, the killer has never been comfortable with their homosexuality, and is repulsed by his actions. (Note: Another expert, Dr. Jonathan Pincus, later noted that while Bonin felt no remorse, he felt a great sense of embarrassment and shame concerning the details of his crimes, and confusion by his obsessive desire to murder.)

Throughout Bonin's trials, and years on death row, experts devoted much speculation and debate as to whether the root cause of his crimes lay in his upbringing. (Note: Several experts noted the methods of physical and psychological torture inflicted by Bonin on his victims had been similar to those directed toward himself as a child.) One of Bonin's lawyers was quoted stating it was "virtually impossible for [Bonin] to be a successful human being" given the abuse he had endured, while a prospective biographer said he was essentially unable to handle minute problems in his daily life due to trauma. One attorney in his trials said that the escalating levels of brutality Bonin displayed toward his victims is similar to that of a drug addict who requires ever-greater dosages to maintain their euphoria. Bonin similarly described having an addiction, recalling extreme restlessness, excitement, and sexual frustration in the hours prior to committing murder. He said he found pleasure in hearing victims scream, and sodomizing them.

=== May 1979 ===
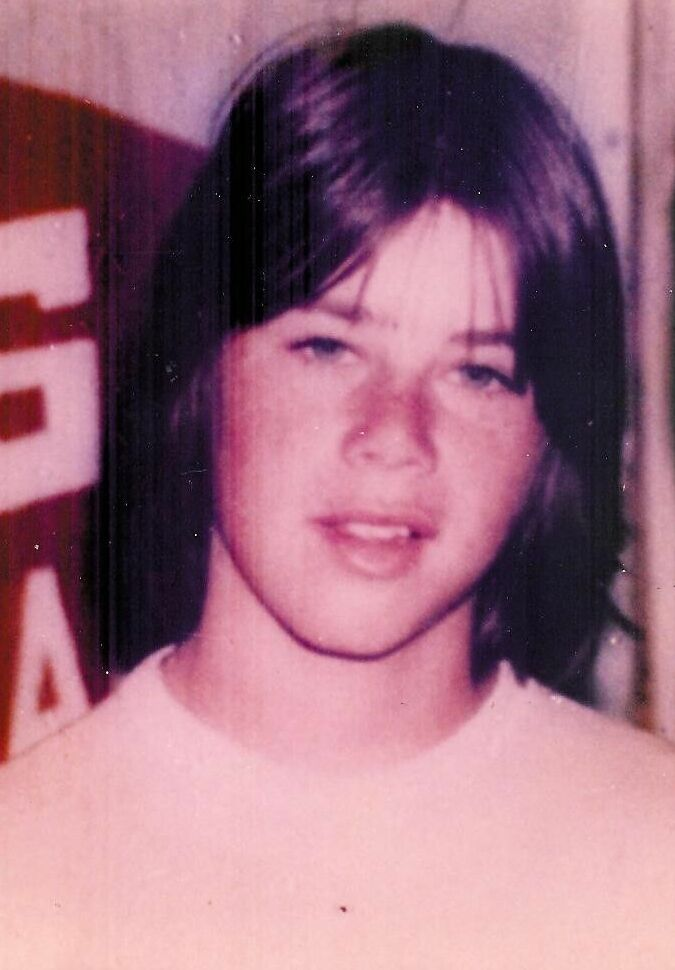
Thomas Lundgren, Bonin's first known murder victim

The earliest murder Bonin was eventually charged with was that of 13-year-old Thomas Lundgren. Lundgren was last seen leaving his house in Reseda on May 28, 1979. Shortly before his abduction, he reportedly told his friends that a man had offered to meet at a skatepark and take pictures for a skateboarding magazine. Lundgren's body was found that afternoon in Agoura. His clothes and severed genitals were in a nearby field. He had been slashed across the throat, stabbed, bludgeoned, then strangled to death. Bonin was assisted by Butts.

=== August 1979 ===
On August 4, Bonin drove from Silverado Canyon to Westminster with Butts. He soon suggested that they rape and murder a teenage hitchhiker. Butts was amenable to this suggestion, and they soon encountered 17-year-old boy Mark Shelton near Beach Boulevard. Bonin allegedly had sex with him, and Butts sexually assaulted him. Bonin drove into Cajon Pass in San Bernardino County, where Bonin parked the vehicle and raped him. Bonin and Butts physically assaulted him until he lost consciousness. He was violated with objects such as a stick, causing him to enter a fatal state of shock. His body was discarded beside a gravel road in Cajon Pass.

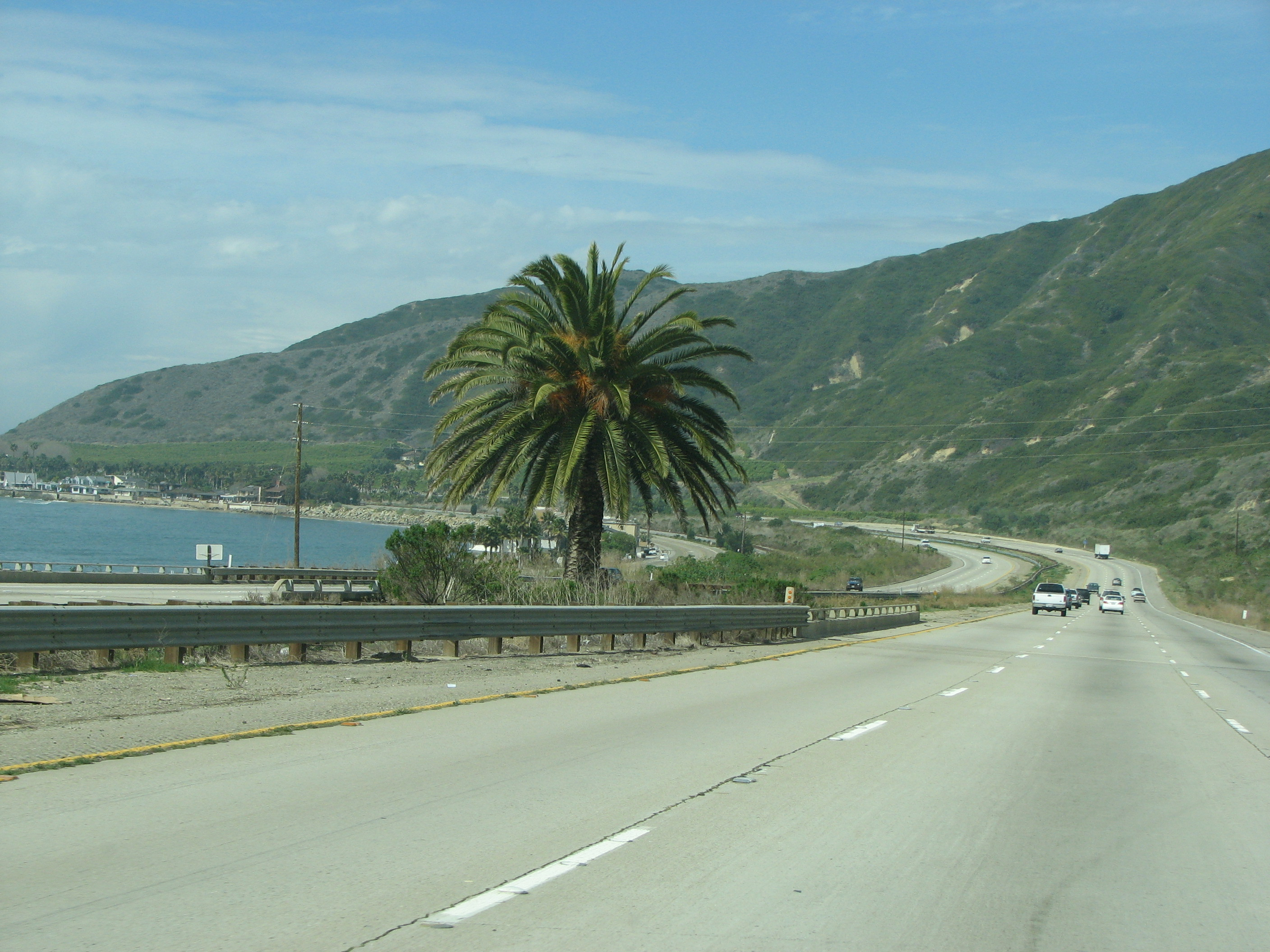
The Pacific Coast Highway, where victim Markus Grabs was abducted while hitchhiking

The night of the following day, Bonin and Butts encountered 17-year-old West German student Markus Grabs, attempting to hitchhike along the Pacific Coast Highway. According to Bonin, he engaged in consensual relations with the youth, who agreed to be bound with lengths of cord and ignition wire. Bonin then threatened Grabs with a knife, as Butts drove toward Bonin's home. There, Grabs was again raped and beaten, but he reportedly broke loose and punched Bonin. Bonin then strangled him, and stabbed him 77 times. His body was discarded in Malibu Creek the following day.

On August 9, Bonin was again detained for molesting a 17-year-old boy from Dana Point. This violation of the conditions of his parole should have resulted in Bonin being returned to prison at Orange County Jail; however, an administrative error committed prior to Bonin's scheduled court date resulted in his release. On August 13, Fraser drove to collect Bonin from jail. He later recollected that as he drove Bonin home, Bonin said, "No one's going to testify again. This is never going to happen to me again." Fraser interpreted this as a statement of remorse.

Resuming his murder spree, Bonin did not show at his court appointment. Bonin had also returned to his parents' house. He gradually developed a reputation as a child molester among local residents, due to his habit of inviting young boys into his house, under the guise of providing alcohol and viewing pornography with them. Some neighbors recalled observing young boys accompany Bonin inside, and they would later hear screaming and crying. Bonin's family, who were occasionally present, claimed to have never witnessed Bonin abuse them.

On August 27, Bonin and Butts abducted 15-year-old Hollywood resident Donald Hyden on Santa Monica Boulevard. Butts was driving the van. Bonin offered him sex. When Butts made an accidental wrong turn, Hyden became frantic, causing Bonin to beat, bind, torture, and sodomize him. Bonin then strangled him to death. Butts performed oral sex on his corpse before the pair dumped his body at a construction site near the Ventura Freeway. It was discovered hours later. A coroner theorized that he had been impaled by a large object, evidenced by rectal damage.

=== September 1979 ===
On September 9, Bonin and Butts encountered a 17-year-old boy from La Mirada, David Murillo, cycling. After Murillo entered the van, Bonin offered him sex, which was refused. He then attempted to fondle Murillo, before binding him and driving to Butts' residence. As Butts drove, Bonin raped him. He then traded places with Butts, who beat and further raped Murillo. They then parked the vehicle, then bound, continued raping, bludgeoned, and strangled him. His body was discovered alongside Highway 101 on the 12th.

On September 17, Bonin picked up 18-year-old Robert Wirostek in Newport Beach. They had sex. Bonin then bound and raped him, driving him to Butts' residence. On the drive, Butts performed oral sex on Wirostek, before striking him and taking Bonin's place as driver. Bonin bent Wirostek's fingers, before sexually assaulting, bludgeoning, and strangling him. Wirostek's body was found on September 27, alongside Interstate 10.

=== November 1979 ===
Bonin is not known to have killed again until on or about November 1. He and Butts abducted and murdered an unidentified young man with brown hair, whom Bonin claimed to be 18 years old. At some point, Bonin allegedly said to the victim he was to die because "your folks paid us to find you and kill you". The two beat him, and Bonin strangled him to death before inserting an ice pick into his head. His body was discarded alongside State Route 99, south of Bakersfield.

On November 30, an unassisted Bonin abducted 17-year-old Frank Dennis Fox, from Bellflower. Bonin bound, sodomized, bludgeoned, and fatally strangled him. His body was found two days later alongside the Ortega Highway, east of San Juan Capistrano.

=== December 1979 ===
Ten days later, a 15-year-old boy named John Kilpatrick had sex with Bonin in Long Beach. Afterwards, Kilpatrick was bound and raped, then Bonin drove him to his parents' house, where Kilpatrick was flagellated and fatally strangled with a string. Kilpatrick's body was discarded near Rialto. It was found on December 13, but he remained a John Doe until August 5, 1980. Because of his troubled background, which led him to disappear for days at a time, his mother hesitated to report the disappearance. His friends also mistakenly reported seeing him at the mall. As a result, he was not reported missing until February 1980.

=== January 1980 ===
On January 1, 1980, Bonin encountered 16-year-old Michael McDonald near the Chino Airport. Under the guise of providing drugs for him to sell, Bonin parked behind an apartment building. In the van, Bonin bound, beat, and raped him. His body was found alongside Highway 71 in the outskirts of Chino, and his body was not identified until March 24.

=== February 1980 ===
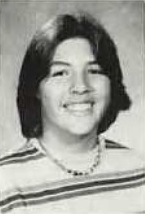
Charles Miranda

On the morning of February 3, Bonin invited a 16-year-old boy into his parents' house to drink and have sex. Bonin allegedly caught him stealing $100 from Bonin's billfold, and decided to murder him. Later that evening, he drove to Hollywood with Gregory Miley, intending to commit a murder with him. They encountered 15-year-old Charles Miranda along Santa Monica Boulevard. According to Miley, Bonin and Miranda had consensual sex in the van as he drove. Bonin then beat, bound, gagged, and sexually assaulted Miranda. Miley failed in an attempt to rape him, and then Bonin fatally strangled him. His body was later dumped in a Los Angeles alleyway.

Five minutes after discarding the body, Bonin suggested to Miley to "do another one". Miley initially protested and stated he wanted to go home, but eventually complied. A few hours later, in Huntington Beach, the pair encountered 12-year-old James Macabe. Macabe had been dropped off at a corner bus stop by his older brother, who had given him money to take the bus to Disneyland. He was lured into Bonin's van on the promise he would be driven to his intended destination, and that he would be given marijuana.

Macabe allegedly got in the van, and Bonin drove to a grocery store. Bonin parked the van, then bound Macabe, before binding him, telling him he was being kidnapped for ransom. Bonin began punching him, and as Miley drove around, Bonin raped him, and bludgeoned him with a tire iron. Macabe eventually fell asleep. When he woke up, Miley and Bonin beat him unconscious, and Bonin crushed his neck with a tire iron. Bonin fatally strangled him, and with Miley, he left the body at a construction site in Walnut. It was discovered three days later. The next day, Bonin was arrested for violating the conditions of his parole; he was held at Orange County Jail until March 4.

=== March 1980 ===
Following his release, on March 14, Bonin abducted 18-year-old Van Nuys man Ronald Gatlin. Bonin bound, beat, and sodomized him, hacking him with an ice pick. The following day, Gatlin's body was found behind an industrial building.

On March 21, Bonin offered a ride to 14-year-old hitchhiker Glenn Barker. Barker was beaten, strangled, and raped with objects, including being burned with a cigarette. Later that day, Bonin abducted 15-year-old Russell Duane Rugh in Garden Grove, and held him captive for about eight hours. Rugh was bound, beaten, and strangled to death. His and Barker's bodies were discarded in Cleveland National Forest, close to the Ortega Highway, and were found on the 23rd.

On another day in March, Bonin offered 17-year-old William Pugh a ride home, as the pair left Fraser's residence. Pugh accepted, and during the ride, Bonin asked him for sex. According to Pugh, he attempted to leave the van once Bonin had slowed down at a stoplight. Bonin dragged him back inside, then informed Pugh how to commit murder without getting caught. Bonin said that he had refrained from sexually assaulting and murdering Pugh not out of sentiment, but because the pair had been seen leaving Fraser's party together. Pugh was driven to what he claimed was his home, and the van drove away.

Pugh kept associating with Bonin. On March 25, Bonin and Pugh abducted a 15-year-old runaway from Lancaster, Harry Turner, in Los Angeles. Pugh and Bonin likely lured Turner into Bonin's van for sex. After binding and sodomizing Turner, Pugh bludgeoned and beat him, while Bonin bit Turner's penis off and fatally strangled him. His body was discarded behind a nearby business.

=== April 1980 ===
"The kid started [fading] out, just kind of [whimpering]. I don't like [raping] some limp piece of meat. It's no fun if they don't let me know how it feels. Guess we gave him too much of the stuff. Next time, I figured I wouldn't use as much. Anyways, I'd gotten my rocks off and the kid was [getting boring], no fun anymore, so I strangled him."

— Bonin, describing the murder of Darin Lee Kendrick

On April 10, Bonin was discharged from parole. Later that day, while driving, Bonin encountered an acquaintance of his, 16-year-old Bellflower resident Steven Wood. Wood entered Bonin's van, and was fatally strangled. Bonin left his body, hogtied, in a Long Beach alleyway. He allegedly waited until dusk to do so. On April 29, Bonin met 19-year-old Darin Kendrick in Stanton. (Note: This supermarket was located close to Butts' former workplace.) Bonin lured Kendrick into the van on the pretext of selling him drugs. Bonin then drove to Butts' apartment in Lakewood. There, he asked Kendrick whether he was gay. Kendrick attempted to flee; Bonin and Butts bound him, and Butts sodomized him. Butts then held Kendrick's mouth open while Bonin poured chloral hydrate down his throat, causing chemical burns. Kendrick fought back, but stopped, complaining of dizziness. Bonin then strangled him, and Butts fatally drove an ice pick into his head. His body was discarded behind a warehouse near the Artesia Freeway.

=== May 1980 ===
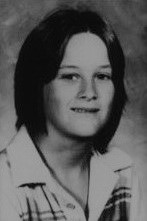
Sean King

On May 12, Bonin abducted and murdered 17-year-old Lawrence Sharp, an acquaintance of his. (Note: Bonin would later allege he had been intimately involved with Sharp, and had taken him out to Knott's Berry Farm for a date when his (Bonin's) girlfriend was absent.) He later stated that he decided to kill Sharp when he had awoken that morning, because Bonin was "tired of having him around". Sharp was bound, sodomized, beaten, and strangled. His body was discarded behind a gas station in Westminster, and was found on the 18th. On May 19, Bonin asked Butts to accompany him on a killing. However, Butts reportedly refused. Unassisted, Bonin abducted 14-year-old Sean King in Downey. King was strangled to death before his body was discarded in Yucaipa.

By early 1980, Bonin's murders were receiving considerable media attention. To deter resulting homophobia, leading gay rights activists offered a reward totaling $50,000 for information leading to the conviction of the suspect or suspects. At this time, the investigating jurisdictions around Southern California determined a definitive link between many of the murders, and began sharing information about them in hopes to find their suspect or suspects. Six officers from three of the jurisdictions formed a task force dedicated to their apprehension.

By May, Pugh had been arrested for auto theft. On May 28, he overheard the details of the ongoing murders on a local radio broadcast, and confided to a counselor that he knew the perpetrator's modus operandi, which was described to him by Bonin two months prior. This counselor reported Pugh's suspicions to the police, who in turn relayed a confidential tip to Los Angeles Police Department (LAPD) officer John St. John. St. John conducted an extensive interview with Pugh the next day. Although Pugh withheld the fact that he had accompanied Bonin on one of his murders, the information he provided led St. John to deduce that Bonin might be the Freeway Killer. David McVicker, whom Bonin had spared in 1975, had also contacted authorities by this time to report his suspicions Bonin may be the Freeway Killer. His suspicions were not dismissed, but regarded as one of numerous public tips to be investigated.

=== June 1980 ===
In June, an 18-year-old vagrant Bonin had recently met, named James Munro, moved into Bonin's house, where the pair had a consensual sexual relationship. Munro later described his initial impression of Bonin as being "a good guy" who was "really normal". On June 1, Bonin informed Munro that he wanted them both to abduct, sexually assault, and murder a hitchhiker.

At this time, the police investigation into Bonin's background revealed his extensive history of convictions for sexually assaulting teenage boys. St. John assigned a surveillance team to monitor his movements. They began surveilling Bonin on the evening of June 2 — one hour prior to Bonin and Munro discarding the body of Bonin's final victim. Hours earlier, Bonin and Munro encountered 18-year-old Steven Wells on El Segundo Boulevard, and enticed him into the van. Bonin had consensual sex with Wells, before persuading him to go to his parents' house, then continued having sex there. (Note: Bonin's parents and older brother were on vacation, and therefore absent from the household at the time of Wells's murder.) Later, Bonin paid Wells $200 to allow himself to be bound with clothesline. Wells became suspicious of their intentions, and frantic. Bonin retreated to the kitchen, telling Munro they were both going to kill Wells. They then gagged and beat him in a hallway. Wells pleaded for his life, but Bonin strangled him to death. Bonin ordered Munro to retrieve a cardboard box, which the two placed Wells' body inside of, and carried to Bonin's van.

Later, while driving to Butts' apartment, Bonin informed Munro that he, Butts, and others had committed many of the "Freeway Killer" murders. At the apartment, Bonin invited Butts to the van to view Wells' body, and asked where he should dispose of it. Munro later testified that Butts recommended near a gas station. They drove to an abandoned station in Huntington Beach, and discarded Wells' body. It was discovered five hours later. Later that night, Bonin hinted to Munro, who was fearful for his life, that he should stay quiet regarding Wells' murder, or possibly face death.

=== List of victims ===
The following is a list of Bonin's murder victims, as described by investigators. Murders for which Bonin was convicted are bolded:

Bonin's murder victims (Note: Sources:)
Year	Victims	Age	Date of disappearance	Date of body discovery	California county of discovery
1979	Thomas Glen Lundgren	13	May 28		Los Angeles County
1979	Mark Duane Shelton	17	August 4	August 11	San Bernardino County
1979	**Markus Alexander Grabs**	17	August 5	August 6	Los Angeles County
1979	**Donald Ray Hyden Jr.**	15	August 27		Los Angeles County
1979	**David Louis Murillo**	17	September 9	September 10	Los Angeles County
1979	Robert Christopher Wirostek	18	September 17	September 27	Orange County
1979	Kern County John Doe	~15–27	Unknown	November 30	Kern County
1979	**Frank Dennis Fox**	17	November 30	December 2	Orange County
1979	John Frederick Kilpatrick	15	December 5	December 13	Los Angeles County
1980	Michael Francis McDonald	16	January 1		San Bernardino County
1980	**Charles Dempster Miranda**	15	February 3		Los Angeles County
1980	**James Michael Macabe**	12	February 3		Los Angeles County
1980	**Ronald Craig Gatlin**	18	March 14	March 15	Los Angeles County
1980	**Glenn Norman Barker**	14	March 21	March 23	Los Angeles County
1980	**Russell Duane Rugh**	15	March 21	March 23	San Diego County
1980	**Harry Todd Turner**	15	March 25	March 26	Los Angeles County
1980	**Steven John Wood**	16	April 4		Los Angeles County
1980	**Darin Lee Kendrick**	19	April 29	May 1	Los Angeles County
1980	**Lawrence Eugene Sharp**	17	May 10	May 18	Los Angeles County
1980	Sean Paige King	14	May 19	May 20	San Bernardino County
1980	**Steven Jay Wells**	18	June 2	June 3	Orange County

== 1980: Arrest ==
After nine days of uneventful surveillance, on June 11, 1980, plainclothes police observed Bonin driving throughout Hollywood, unsuccessfully attempting to lure five separate boys into his van, before succeeding in luring one. The police followed Bonin until he parked at a service station close to the Hollywood Freeway, then discreetly approached the vehicle. Upon hearing screams and banging sounds coming from inside the van, the officers forced their way inside. They discovered Bonin raping 17-year-old Orange County runaway Harold Eugene Tate, whom he had handcuffed and bound.

Bonin was initially charged with the rape of a minor, and held on suspicion of Miranda's murder. He was detained in lieu of $250,000 bond. Later, Bonin's girlfriend notified his boss of his arrest, adding that the arrest was in connection to the Freeway Killer case. This caused Munro (already apprehensive at Bonin's absence from work that day) to become frantic. The next day, Munro stole Bonin's car and fled back to Michigan, where he temporarily resided before being arrested.

Inside Bonin's van, investigators discovered numerous artifacts which proved his culpability in the Freeway Killer murders. These included various restraining devices, knives, and a tire iron. They also noted the removed door handles. A forensic examination of the van and Bonin's home revealed extensive traces of bloodstains. Inside the glove box, investigators discovered his scrapbook of newspaper clippings about the murders. On October 11, 1980, Bonin's father died of cirrhosis, caused by alcoholism.

=== Confession ===
Although initially alleging his innocence in the murders, after reading a letter from Sean King's mother imploring him to reveal the location of her son's body, Bonin confessed his guilt to St. John. However, Bonin clarified that it was not to ease the mother's pain, but because King being buried in San Bernardino County meant police would likely buy him a hamburger during the extensive trip.

I tied him up with [nylon, and then] I pulled a knife on him and he got scared. I stabbed him in the left arm[;] it surprised me that I did it. I stabbed him again, and then again, and again, and again, until he was helpless [...] They would try to stop me from stabbing them, and I would stab just to stab. I stuck them with the knife in different places, because I didn't know where to stab, you know; I didn't know where the vital organs [were.]

— Bonin in 1980, confessing to stabbing Markus Grabs and other victims

Over the course of several evenings, Bonin confessed to abducting, raping, and killing 21 young men and boys in graphic detail. He expressed no remorse for his actions, but showed extreme embarrassment and regret over being caught. Bonin stated that his primary accomplice in the murders had been Butts, while Miley and Munro were accomplices. Bonin was physically linked to many of the murders by blood and semen stains. Numerous carpet fibers found upon seven of the victims' bodies were a precise match with the carpeting in Bonin's van. Furthermore, on three bodies, investigators found hair samples which were a precise match with Bonin. Six of the murders were found to have been committed by a unique windlass strangulation method, which his prosecutor later described as Bonin's "signature" or "trademark".

Initially formally arraigned for the murder of Grabs on July 25, by July 29, Bonin had been charged with an additional 15 murders to which he had confessed, and upon which the prosecution believed they had sufficient evidence to obtain a conviction. In addition to the 16 murder indictments, he was also charged with 11 counts of robbery, one count of sodomy, and one count of mayhem. He was held without bond. Bonin was not brought to trial for the murders of Mark Shelton, Robert Wirostek, John Kilpatrick, Michael McDonald, or the November 1979 John Doe, because police did not find sufficient evidence linking him alone to the crimes. This is despite Bonin confessing to the murders of Kilpatrick and McDonald. On August 8, all charges were formally submitted against Bonin. Three days later, Earl Hanson was appointed as his attorney; in October 1981, Bonin had him replaced with William Charvet and Tracy Stewart.

=== Accomplices' arrests ===
Based on Bonin's confession, police obtained a warrant to search Butts' Lakewood property, which happened on July 25. The search uncovered evidence linking Butts to several murders which Bonin had already confessed to. Butts was brought before a Municipal Court on July 29, and charged with accompanying Bonin on six murders, and with three counts of robbery. The Los Angeles County Sheriff's Department told the press: "Bonin and Butts are believed to be responsible for the kidnapping, torture, and murder of at least 21 young males", 14 incidents having been in their jurisdiction.

Despite initially proclaiming his innocence, Butts soon confessed to having accompanied Bonin upon each of the murders he was charged with, and to have sexually abused several victims. Butts claimed to have participated in the murders primarily out of fear, claiming, "It was either go, or become the next victim", adding he only found the courage to confess upon learning Bonin was in custody. Butts was adamant he only had a limited role in the victims' torture, except for one. He claimed that, upon their successfully luring a victim into Bonin's van, Butts would typically drive a short distance, before stopping to assist Bonin in restraining their captive. He claimed his participation was limited to this restraining, except he had mutilated one victim with a wire coat hanger. He said that Bonin would escalate his beatings of victims if they had resisted his sexual advances.

Butts rejected an offer to plead guilty to all charges filed against him in exchange for a life sentence with a minimum of 25 years before the possibility of parole. He did not agree to accept any form of plea bargain, or to testify against Bonin. He was brought before Orange County Municipal Court Judge Richard Orozco on November 14, 1980, and was formally charged with participating in three further murders committed in the county. His trial was scheduled for July 27, 1981.

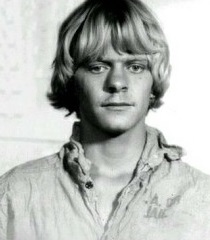
Gregory Miley's mug shot after his extradition to Los Angeles County

On July 31, 1980, Munro was arrested in Port Huron, Michigan. He was extradited to California, and charged with Wells' murder. He pleaded innocent to all charges against him on August 14. Miley, who was in Texas, discussed his role in the Miranda and Macabe murders in a recorded phone conversation with a friend, thus substantiating Bonin's earlier confession. On August 22, Miley was arrested, and he was charged by California authorities with the murders of Miranda and Macabe. On December 18, he pleaded not guilty to two charges of first-degree murder, but at two pretrial hearings in May 1981, he pleaded guilty.

First-degree murder charges were brought against a 20-year-old acquaintance of Bonin, Eric Wijnaendts, in December 1980. After police learned Pugh had willingly accompanied Bonin in Harry Todd Turner's murder, Wijnaendts' charges were dropped in January 1981, with the county prosecutor citing insufficient evidence as the cause. (Note: Wijnaendts was a Dutch-born youth who had encountered Bonin while the two were incarcerated at Orange County jail in early March 1980 (where Wijnaendts had been incarcerated upon charges of public intoxication and battery). Bonin had informed police Pugh had been his accomplice in the murder of Turner, and not Wijnaendts, upon learning of Wijnaendts's arrest.)

== 1981: Preliminary hearings ==
At a preliminary hearing held in Los Angeles County before Los Angeles County Superior Court Judge Julius Leetham on January 2, 1981, Bonin formally pleaded innocent to 14 first-degree murder charges and numerous counts of sodomy, robbery and mayhem. In eleven of these indictments, a felony-murder-robbery special circumstance was also alleged. Bonin was ordered to return to court on January 7 for pretrial motions and the formal setting of a trial date.

On the 7th, Butts was arraigned on five counts of murder, and three counts of robbery. By this point, he had been listed as an accomplice in the murders of Lundgren, Shelton, Grabs, Hyden, Murillo, Wirostek, Kendrick, Wells, and the November 1979 John Doe. Four days after his formal plea, he died from suicide by hanging in his cell. Butts' attorney theorized that his depressive state had been magnified by the impending release of transcripts of a preliminary hearing in which Butts had graphically described his victims' torture, which would have negatively affected his friends and family. Butts' suicide rendered his testimony inadmissible as evidence in cases of three murders Bonin was charged with—Shelton, Wirostek, and the John Doe—so those charges were dropped.

Both Miley and Munro agreed to testify against Bonin in court in exchange for being spared the death penalty, and the dismissal of Munro's sodomy and robbery charges. In the case of Miley, Norris agreed to accept two separate pleas of guilty to first-degree murder. This was in exchange for two concurrent sentences of life imprisonment, with a possibility of parole after 25 years if Miley agreed to testify against Bonin at both upcoming trials. William Pugh also agreed to testify, having pleaded guilty to one count of voluntary manslaughter, for which he later received six years in prison.

== 1981–1982: Los Angeles murder trial ==
On October 19, 1981, Bonin was brought to trial in Los Angeles County, charged with the murder of 12 of his victims whose bodies had been found within the county. He was tried before Superior Court Judge William Keene. The trial commenced on November 5.

Norris, acting as prosecutor, sought the death penalty for each count of murder for which Bonin was tried. Norris described Bonin's routine and technique with regards to his victims' torture, and how he would reach the "climax of the orgy" by killing them. He asserted that Bonin murdered as a group sport, with accomplices that he had groomed because of their "low mentality". Miley and Munro testified against Bonin, describing their murders in detail. Miley testified to his participation in the murders of Miranda and Macabe, describing how the two victims were beaten and tortured before being murdered. He said that Bonin had pressed a tire iron against Miranda's neck, and Miley "jumped down on him", killing him.

The strategy of Charvet and Stewart was to challenge the credibility of the prosecution's witnesses, and to suggest that significant mitigating factors as to the causes of Bonin's behavior lay in the extensive physical, sexual, and emotional abuse he had endured throughout his early life. They summoned psychoanalyst David Foster, to testify on his prior psychological examinations of Bonin. Foster stated that, as a result of abandonment as a child, Bonin had not received the nurturing necessary for sufficient psychological development, and the abuse was so prevalent that Bonin became confused as to the difference between violence and love. The prosecution then summoned forensic psychiatrist Park Dietz, who, in contrast to Foster, testified that Bonin had not exhibited an inability to control his impulses, and that his actions were instead planned out. He concluded that Bonin was a sadomasochist with antisocial personality disorder, but that neither condition necessitated uncontrollable impulses.

On November 24, prison inmate Lloyd Douglas—Lawrence Sharp's uncle—testified that Bonin had bragged to him of his culpability in the Freeway Killer murders while both were in Los Angeles County Jail in 1980. Douglas described multiple details of Bonin's torture of victims that were not supported by evidence.

Against overruled objections from the defense, reporter David Lopez waived his previously sought immunity under California's shield law, and agreed to testify on behalf of the prosecution as to the details of seven interviews Bonin had granted him between December 1980 and April 1981. Lopez testified that Bonin had said he would refuse to talk with any other reporter if Lopez would agree not to broadcast the precise details of the interview. When Lopez had agreed to these conditions, Bonin confessed to him that he was the Freeway Killer, and had murdered 21 people. Allegedly, Bonin had confided that although he resented the prospect of being executed, he murdered people simply for enjoying the "sound of kids dying". When Lopez asked Bonin what he would be doing if he were still at large, Bonin had replied he would still be killing, because "it got easier with each one". Lopez initially refused to disclose Bonin's confession, but changed his mind after Bonin broke his own promise by talking to other reporters.

=== Closing arguments ===
Closing arguments were in late December. Norris described Bonin as someone who derived extreme pleasure from his victims' suffering, and that he acted with malice aforethought. Norris outlined the torture Bonin's victims had endured, and urged the jurors to "give him what he has earned".

Charvet did not specifically ask the jurors to find Bonin not guilty, instead requesting they only return the "reasonable verdict you can bring". This indicated a likelihood of not guilty verdicts on at least some counts Bonin was charged with. Charvet doubted the credibility of some of Miley and Munro's testimony; he emphasized their turning state's evidence made them tailor their testimony to the desires of the police. He reminded the jury he had exposed inconsistencies in Munro's account of Wells' murder, that Munro lied on numerous occasions, that Bonin had been extensively abused as a child, and of the diagnoses the doctors in Atascadero had reached. He claimed the prosecution was hoping the jury would convict Bonin simply based on their "revulsion".

=== Conviction ===
On December 28, the jury formally began their deliberations. On January 6, 1982, they convicted Bonin of ten murders. He was found not guilty of: the murders of Lundgren and King, committing sodomy upon Grabs, committing mayhem upon Lundgren, and robbing one other victim. Bonin was cleared of King's sodomy and murder, because he had led police to King's body in 1980 under the agreement that his doing so could not be used against him in court. Therefore, the prosecutors had discussed King's disappearance at the trial, but not the discovery of his body. He was cleared of the charges of mayhem and murder against Lundgren because, according to López, he had strenuously denied committing this particular killing in their interviews.

Later, Norris asked the jury to give Bonin the death penalty, while Charvet requested life imprisonment. The jury found that the special circumstances required within California state law (multiple murders and robbery) had been met in the cases for which Bonin was found guilty, and returned a unanimous death verdict.

=== Sentencing ===
"He had a total disregard for the sanctity of human life and a civilized society. Sadistic, unbelievably cruel, senseless and deliberately premeditated. Guilty beyond any possible or imaginary doubt."

— Los Angeles Superior Court Judge William Keene pronouncing the death sentence upon Bonin, March 12, 1982

In February 1982, Charvet argued against imposition of the death verdict returned by the jury. Despite his impassioned appeal, Keene formally sentenced Bonin to death for the ten murders, and ordered that if his death sentence were commuted to one of life imprisonment, the sentences should run consecutively. Bonin told his attorney he fully expected to receive the death penalty. Bonin was told he would be executed via gas chamber at San Quentin State Prison, and he seemed unconcerned upon learning this. (Note: Several family members of Bonin's victims later recounted that Bonin had remained remorseless throughout his trial, seemingly deriving pleasure from their anguish.)

Prior to his scheduled second trial in Orange County, Bonin was temporarily removed from death row, as his cellmate, a gang member, had severely beaten him. Bonin was held in solitary confinement until his trial was over. (Note: This incident had occurred on December 8, 1981; Bonin had subsequently worn sunglasses in court to conceal his black eyes.) Meanwhile, Charvet attempted to secure a change of venue for the trial, saying the extensive pretrial publicity surrounding the case in Orange County would minimize the chances of securing an untainted jury within that jurisdiction. Judge Kenneth Lae refused in November, ruling that there had only been minimal publicity in Orange County regarding the previous trial.

== 1983: Orange County murder trial ==
Bonin was brought to trial in Orange County on March 21, 1983. He was charged with the robbery and murder of four further victims whose bodies had been found within the jurisdiction. He was tried before Superior Court Judge Kenneth Lae. Two hundred and four prospective jurors were subjected to voir dire jury selection, until sixteen were picked in June. Bonin's attorney then renewed an earlier filed motion that the trial should be moved outside of Orange County due to pretrial publicity tainting the jury pool. This motion was again rejected by Judge Lae, who ruled that the trial would begin on June 14.

The prosecutor, Bryan Brown, contended that all four victims killed within the constituency had been abducted while hitchhiking, then ordered to strip before being bound, raped, beaten, tortured, and strangled. In each instance, the ligature had left an impression upon the victim's neck. He also noted similarities in each murder, and between these and Miranda and Wells' murders. Emphasis was placed upon the fibers found upon each of the Orange County victims — and three Los Angeles County victims — being a precise match to the carpeting in Bonin's van. As such, Brown stated, the four Orange County victims had been killed by the same individual who had killed Miranda and Wells, and his accomplices in the Miranda and Wells murders, Miley and Munro, would testify as to their participation. The prosecution presented forensic experts who testified on the matching fibers, and blood found in the van.

Charvet refuted these contentions, saying that any similarities in modus operandi did not automatically prove his client's guilt, and that the evidence presented did not support the prosecution's contention, beyond a reasonable doubt, that Bonin had murdered any of the four Orange County victims, or the two Los Angeles County victims. Charvet attacked the credibility of Munro, and contended Bonin was simply a scapegoat for four unsolved murders. He also argued that Brown had "spent more time discussing the two Los Angeles cases" Bonin had been convicted for more than actually proving Bonin had committed any of the Orange County murders.

During the six-week trial, Bonin's attorneys called two witnesses in his defense. One of them was Munro, who conceded Bonin had communicated with him prior to his testifying in this second trial, requesting that he lie when testifying.

=== Second conviction ===
On August 1, 1983, both counsels delivered their closing arguments, and the jury retired. They deliberated for less than three hours, announcing on the 2nd that they had found Bonin guilty of each count of murder and robbery. After three days of deliberation, on August 22, the jury announced their recommendations that he be sentenced to death on each count. On August 26, Bonin received four further death sentences. Following these convictions, Bonin was transferred from the Orange County jail back to San Quentin State Prison, to await execution via the gas chamber.

== 1983–1996: Death row ==
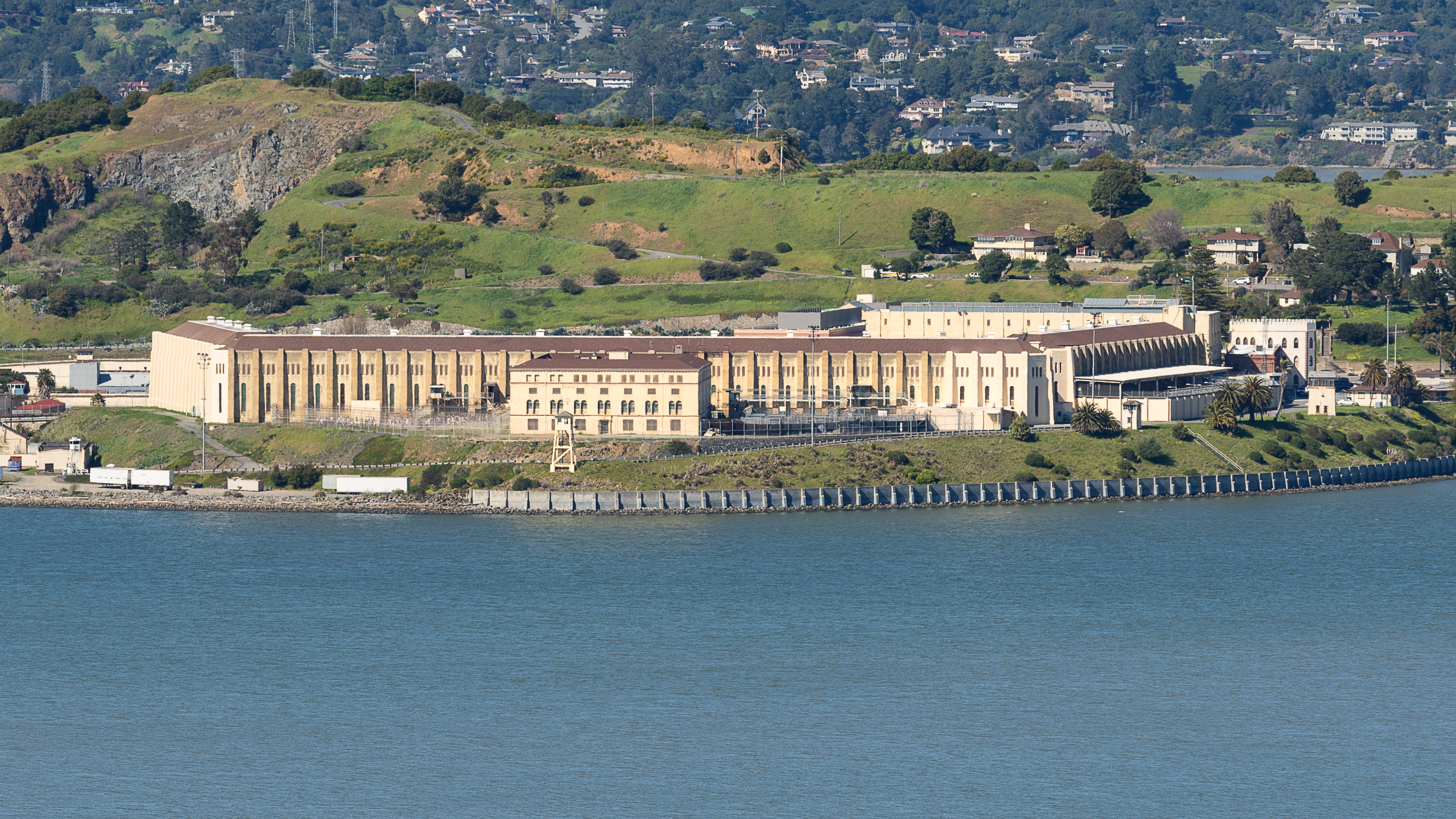
San Quentin State Prison, where Bonin was on death row

In his years on death row, Bonin undertook painting and writing. He wrote a series of short stories called Doing Time: Stories from the Mind of a Death Row Prisoner. He became close friends with convicted murderers Douglas Clark, Jimmy Lee Smith, Lawrence Bittaker, and Randy Kraft (who shared the nickname "Freeway Killer"). He also corresponded with numerous individuals, including the mothers of some of his victims. To the mothers, he never expressed regret or remorse over the murders, purposefully withholding information his victims' families sought, and seemingly deriving pleasure from their discontent. Bonin once informed the mother of Sean King that her son had been his favorite victim as "he was such a screamer". (Note: King's mother, Lavada Gifford, had first wrote to Bonin in 1989, having read of his becoming a born-again Christian.) Bonin told both his defense attorneys and several people with whom he corresponded that Butts had been the actual ringleader behind the murders, and that he had simply been Butts' accomplice. (Note: On one occasion, Bonin claimed Butts had suggested to him the two should embark on a spree of murder in order that Butts would incorporate aspects of these murders into his Dungeons & Dragons game with another man.) These claims would be disputed by Stirling Norris, the prosecutor at Bonin's Los Angeles County murder trial, who said that Bonin "was the leader, and he chose weak people he could use."

Instead of a gas chamber, Bonin was scheduled to be executed by lethal injection in 1992, the first such execution in California. The state had recently decided to use injections for executions, after Robert Alton Harris' death via gas chamber—the state's first execution in decades—was found to be a "cruel and unusual punishment" for crimes, which are prohibited by the Constitution's Eighth Amendment.

=== Appeals ===
Bonin filed numerous appeals against his convictions and sentencing, citing issues such as jury prejudice, the potential of jury inflammation via listening to numerous victim impact statements (to which his defense counsel had offered to stipulate), and inadequate defense. For these appeals, Bonin hired new lawyers, who submitted contentions that Charvet had provided inadequate defense by failing to place sufficient emphasis upon Bonin's bipolar disorder and childhood sexual abuse, which would have "humanized" Bonin to the jury. Each successive appeal proved unsuccessful.

Despite upholding the convictions, the Supreme Court poured scorn upon Judge Keene for failing to fully heed a warning given by the prosecution prior to the Los Angeles County trial, that Munro had discussed the possibility of agreeing to legal representation by Charvet prior to his testimony. Despite admonishing Charvet for a potential conflict of interest, Judge Keene had permitted him to act as Bonin's defense attorney at his first trial. However, the Supreme Court ruled in 1989 that Charvet had effectively cross-examined Munro at trial, and that Keene's actions, though "inexplicable", had not effectively harmed Bonin's legal defense. Merit was given to Bonin's contention that his defense should have been allowed to stipulate to the testimony of the victims' parents, rather than their being allowed to identify photographs of their sons in both life and death at his trials. Despite this ruling, this finding was also deemed not to have affected the overall verdict.

A final submission to the United States Court of Appeals was submitted in 1994. Bonin contended issues such as his being denied the effective assistance of counsel at his trials, that he had been denied due process at his Los Angeles trial due to the judge's refusal to suppress Munro and Miley's testimonies, that Charvet failed to point out Bonin's brain damage and other mitigating circumstances, and that the judge at his Orange County trial had denied his counsel's motion for a change of venue upon the basis that pretrial publicity had effectively minimized any chance of obtaining an unbiased jury. This appeal was rejected in 1995, with the appellate judges stating they had found no evidence of legal misconduct, and that no evidence existed that the 13 jurors who served upon the Orange County trial had been incapable of judging Bonin with impartiality. As such, the judges declared their satisfaction with Bonin's convictions, concluding that his verdict would not have changed with further mitigating circumstances revealed.

The various experts who had examined Bonin would find conflict with one another's assertions, with Dr. Park Dietz stating that fellow Dr. Foster largely mischaracterized and exaggerated the evidence used to prove Bonin was extensively abused as a child, and mistakenly assumed Bonin's Babinski reflex and other symptoms were indicative of brain damage that influenced his crimes. On February 20, 1996, the Ninth Circuit Court of Appeals rejected Bonin's plea for clemency on the grounds of inadequate legal representation at both trials.

== 1996: Execution ==
I think I've accepted the fact that this may come about, and I've made my peace with it and if it happens, it happens [...] As far as how I'm going to feel at that very moment, I can't answer that question. I don't know; I don't think any of us would know until we're there [...] Well, probably I went in the service too soon because I was peaking in my bowling career [...] So I regret that I didn't get to go out and get the instruction, and pursue that. Because I've always had a love for bowling.

— Bonin, reflecting on his impending execution and life regrets. February 22, 1996.

On February 23, 1996, near midnight before the following day, Bonin (age 49) was executed by lethal injection inside the gas chamber at San Quentin State Prison. He had been on death row for fourteen years, and was the first person ever executed by lethal injection in California. Governor Pete Wilson, who had rejected a submitted plea for clemency from Bonin's attorneys three days before the execution, called Bonin the "poster boy for capital punishment".

In his final interview, with a local radio station less than 24 hours before the execution, Bonin said that he had "made peace" with his impending death, and that his only major regret in life was not pursuing his teenage passion of bowling long enough to turn professional. He also said that he thought the death penalty is wrong. He denied responsibility for his actions, saying that he had no control over them.

At 6 p.m. on the 23rd, Bonin was moved from his cell to a death-watch cell, where he ordered his last meal. (Note: Two large pizzas, three pints of ice cream, and three six-packs of Coca-Cola.) His last hours were spent with five people he had chosen, including his attorney and chaplain. His attorney later said that he had not detected any remorse in Bonin then. Around one hour prior to the scheduled execution, the Supreme Court refused to hear his final plea to overturn his death sentence, deciding that his attorneys had given him adequate representation. The Court of Appeals ruled that his attorneys should not have waited until the last minute to submit arguments for overturning or postponing the execution. They also rejected Bonin's claim that he had a right to choose between the gas chamber and lethal injection for the execution method.

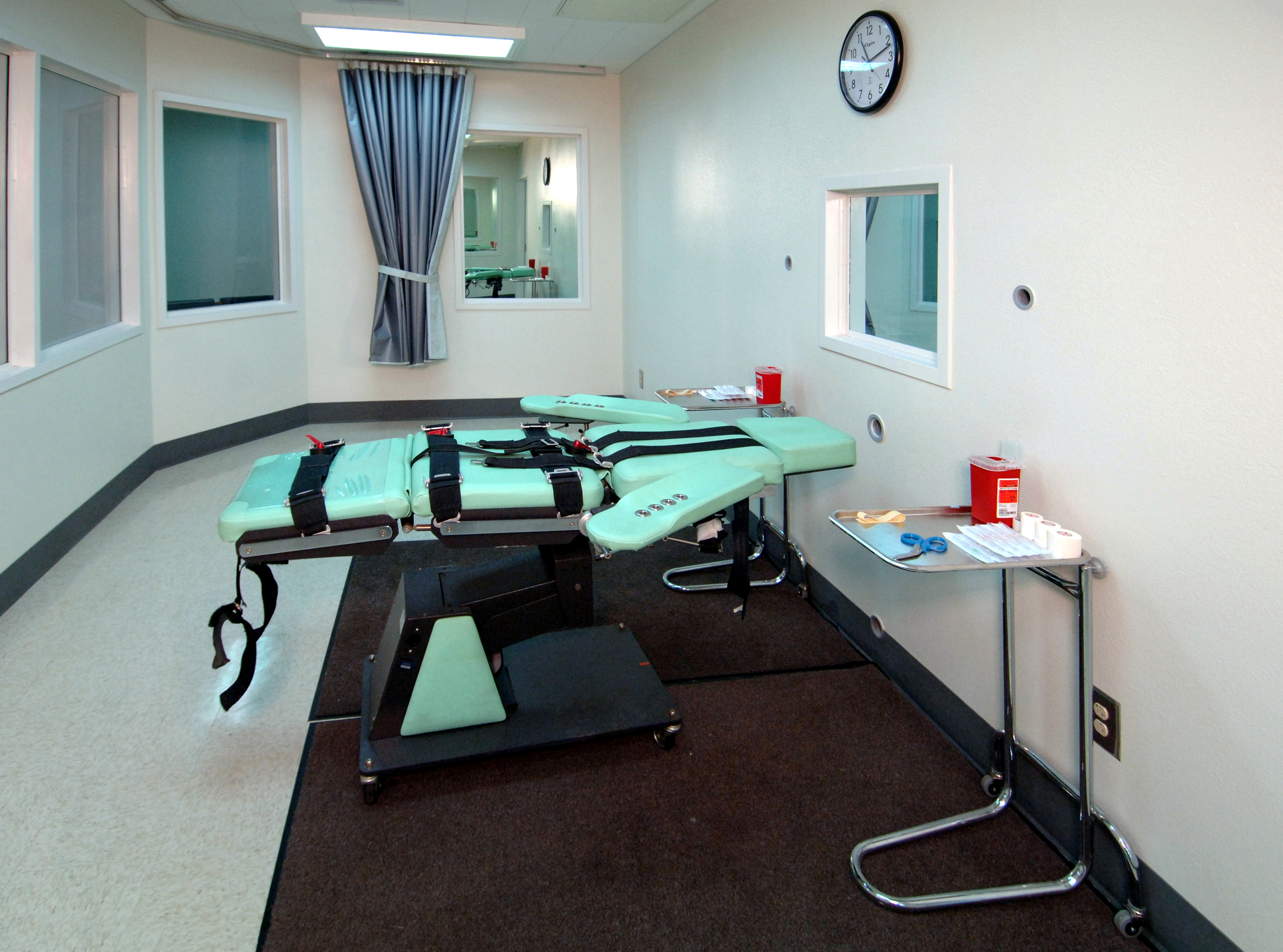
The lethal injection room at San Quentin State Prison, 2010

Bonin wrote a final statement on a note he gave to the prison warden at 11 p.m.:

I feel the death penalty is not an answer to the problems at hand. I feel it sends the wrong message to the people of this country. Young people act as they see other people acting instead of as people tell them to act. I would advise that when a person has a thought of doing anything serious against the law, that before they did, they should go to a quiet place and think about it seriously.

At 11:45, he was escorted to the execution chamber, and was executed at midnight.

Bonin was pronounced dead at 12:13 a.m on February 24. None of his relatives were present, but several relatives of his victims were. The execution passed without complications.

== Aftermath ==
Bonin's family refused to claim his remains. They were cremated in a private ceremony that none of his family members attended, and his ashes were later scattered over the Pacific Ocean. Three weeks after his execution, authorities discovered that his mother had exploited an administrative error to receive Bonin's social security disability payments, which he had gotten since 1972 for his mental illness, and should have terminated upon his 1982 imprisonment. His mother used the payments—about $79,424—for her house bills. In March 1996, she agreed to pay restitution for receiving them, claiming neither she nor Bonin were aware that it was illegal to do so.

David McVicker, who witnessed Bonin's execution, was traumatized by his experiences with Bonin. He had nightmares, dropped out of high school, and became addicted to drugs and alcohol, but said the execution brought him closure. He later advocated for Miley and Munro to remain incarcerated. Munro was sentenced to 15 years to life for the murder of Wells in 1981. He has repeatedly appealed the sentence, claiming he had not known Bonin was the Freeway Killer until after Wells' murder, and that he had been tricked into accepting a plea bargain whereby he pleaded guilty to murder. He is incarcerated at Mule Creek State Prison. Miley was sentenced to a term of 25 years to life for the first-degree murder of Miranda in 1982. He was later sentenced to a concurrent term of 25 years to life for the abduction and murder of Macabe. In 2016, Miley died from being attacked by another inmate at Mule Creek State Prison. Pugh was sentenced to six years in prison for the voluntary manslaughter of Harry Turner in 1982. He served less than four years of his sentence, and was released from prison in 1985.

== Media depictions ==
Besides Bonin's own Doing Time, his murder spree has been covered in many books: Angel of Darkness (1991) by Dennis McDougal, William Bonin (2015) by Jack Rosewood, and Without Redemption (2022) by Michael Butler and Vonda Pelto.

It has also been covered in multiple TV documentaries, including episodes of History Channel's Infamous Murders in 2001, Sky Mix's World's Most Evil Killers in 2021, and A&E's I Survived A Serial Killer in 2022. Investigation Discovery broadcast the documentary The Freeway Killer in 2014, and the American ABC News released a six-part documentary titled City of Angels, City of Death in 2021.

The film Freeway Killer was released by Image Entertainment in 2010. This film is directly based upon the murders committed by Bonin and his accomplices. The film cast Scott Anthony Leet as Bonin and Dusty Sorg as Butts.

== See also ==
- List of people executed in California
- List of people executed in the United States in 1996
- List of serial killers by number of victims
- List of serial killers in the United States

== Cited works and further reading ==
- Cawthorne, Nigel; Tibballs, Geoff (1993). Killers. Boxtree. ISBN 978-0-752-20850-3.
- Fox, Lester (1996). "True Crime: Freeway Killer". True Crime Monthly (June 1996). ISSN 1191-9949.
- Jessel, David (1992). "Investigations into the Ultimate Crime". Murder Casebook (130). Marshall Cavendish. ISBN 0-7485-3874-7.
- Lane, Brian; Gregg, Wilfred (1992). The Encyclopedia of Serial Killers. Headline Books. ISBN 978-0-747-23731-0.
- McDougal, Dennis (1991). Angel of Darkness: The True Story of Randy Kraft and the Most Heinous Murder Spree of the Century. New York: Warner Books. ISBN 978-0-708-85342-9. OCLC 28747742. Angel of Darkness: The True Story of Randy Kraft and the Most Heinous Murder Spree of the Century at Google Books
- Newton, Michael (2006). The Encyclopedia of Serial Killers. Checkmark Books. ISBN 978-0-816-03979-1.
- O'Kane, James (2017). Wicked Deeds: Murder In America. Taylor & Francis. ISBN 978-1-351-32194-5.
- Odell, Robin (2010). The Mammoth Book of Bizarre Crimes. Robinson Publishing. ISBN 978-1-849-01436-6.
- Palmer, Louis J. (2020). Encyclopedia of Capital Punishment in the United States. McFarland & Company. ISBN 978-0-786-40944-0.
- Pelto, Vonda (2007). Without Remorse: The Story of the Woman who Kept Los Angeles' Serial Killers Alive. Seven Locks Press. ISBN 978-0-979-58528-9.
- Rosewood, Jack (2015). William Bonin: The True Story of the Freeway Killer. CreateSpace. ISBN 978-1-5196-3119-0.
- Strand, Ginger (2012). Killer on the Road: Violence and the American Interstate. Austin: University of Texas Press. ISBN 978-0-292-72637-6.
- Wynn, Douglas (1996). On Trial For Murder. Pan Books. ISBN 978-0-330-33947-6.
- Pelto, Vonda; Butler, Michael (2022). Without Redemption: Creation & Deeds of Freeway Killer Bill Bonin, His Five Accomplices & How One Who Escaped Justice. Barnes & Noble Press. ISBN 979-8-8231-2054-8.

Executions carried out in California
Preceded by David Edwin Mason August 24, 1993	William George Bonin; February 23, 1996	Succeeded by Keith Daniel Williams May 3, 1996
Executions carried out in the United States
Preceded by Jeffery Paul Sloan – Missouri February 21, 1996	William George Bonin – California; February 23, 1996	Succeeded by Kenneth Granviel – Texas February 27, 1996
