= Manny Babbitt =

American murderer (1949–1999)

Manuel Pina Babbitt
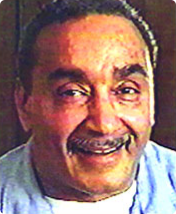
- Babbitt in 1999
- Born: May 3, 1949; Wareham, Massachusetts, U.S.
- Died: May 4, 1999 (aged 50); San Quentin State Prison, California, U.S.
- Other name: Manny Babbitt
- Status: Executed by lethal injection
- Convictions: First degree murder with special circumstances Attempted rape (2 counts); Robbery; Burglary
- Penalty: Death (July 6, 1982)

Details
- Victims: Leah Schendel
- Date: December 19, 1980
- Country: United States
- State: California

Manuel Pina "Manny" Babbitt (May 3, 1949 – May 4, 1999) was a U.S. Marine veteran of the Vietnam War who was convicted of the murder of a 78-year-old woman, Leah Schendel, during a burglary in Sacramento, California in 1980. Babbitt was executed by the state of California by lethal injection at San Quentin State Prison, one day after his 50th birthday. The murder was committed during a string of robberies and burglaries and the day after the murder Babbitt committed at least one sexual assault. Schendel died from a heart attack after Babbitt beat and tried to rape her.

Babbitt had been wounded at the bloody 1968 Battle of Khe Sanh in Quảng Trị Province, South Vietnam. As part of his defense, he claimed he suffered from post-traumatic stress disorder which he said caused him to commit his crimes and to later lose all memories of the crimes.

One year before his execution, while on death row, Babbitt was awarded a Purple Heart medal for the wounds he had received at the Battle of Khe Sanh.

Babbitt refused his last meal and asked that the $50 allotted be given to homeless Vietnam veterans. His last words were: "I forgive all of you." He was buried in his native Wareham, Massachusetts, on May 10, 1999, with full military honors.

The movie Last Day of Freedom, nominated for an Oscar in 2016, depicts his brother's narrative of the events that led to Babbitt's execution.

== See also ==
- Capital punishment in California
- Capital punishment in the United States
- List of people executed in California
- List of people executed in the United States in 1999

Preceded by Jaturun Siripongs	Executions carried out in California	Succeeded by Darrell Keith Rich
