= Thomas Martin Thompson =

American man executed in 1998

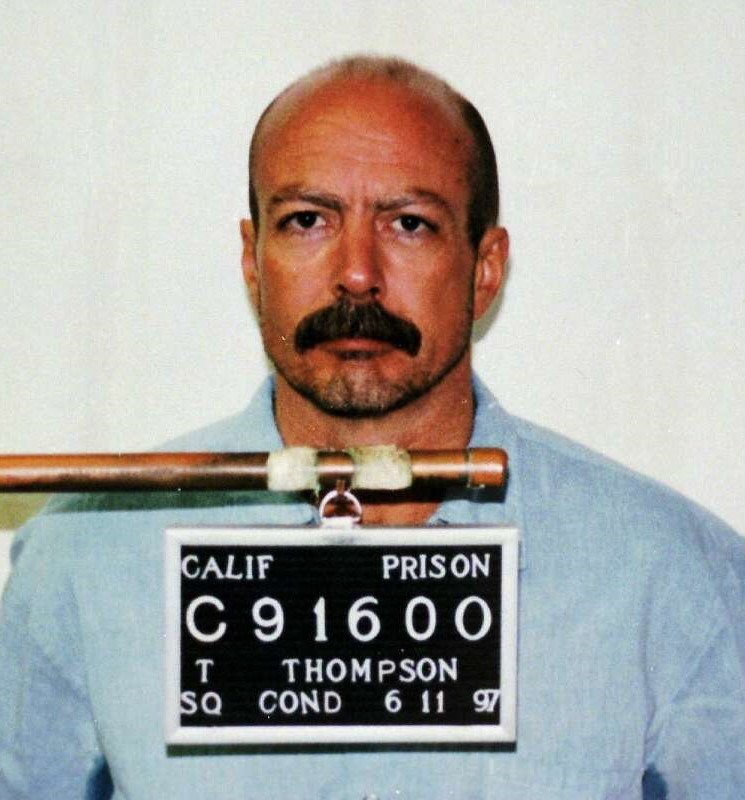
- Thompson in a 1997 prison photograph
- Born: March 20, 1955; Chicago, Illinois, U.S.
- Died: July 14, 1998 (aged 43); San Quentin State Prison, California, U.S.
- Status: Executed by lethal injection
- Convictions: First degree murder with special circumstances Forcible rape
- Penalty: Death

Details
- Imprisoned at: San Quentin State Prison

Thomas Martin Thompson (March 20, 1955 – July 14, 1998) was an American man who was executed in 1998 by the state of California for the 1981 killing of Ginger Fleischli. His execution was controversial; some believe him to have been innocent of the charges, while others thought Thompson's guilt was clear.

== Early life ==
Thompson was born on March 20, 1955, in Chicago, Illinois. His parents divorced when he was five and he moved with his mother and sister to New York. The family later moved to Orange County, California. Thompson attended Villa Park High School but moved back to Chicago to be with his father in his senior year. He joined the army and received letters of commendation. He was later given an honorable discharge. He returned to California and went to California State University, Fullerton and Santa Ana College on the GI bill and became a photographer.

== Murder ==
On September 11, 1981, Thompson and Ginger Fleischli, joined by Thompson's roommate, David Leitch, Leitch's ex-wife Tracy, and Afshin Kashani, spent an evening in Laguna Beach, California visiting bars and smoking marijuana. Tracy and Fleischli had been roommates for two weeks. Fleischli was subsequently reported missing, and three days later the authorities found Fleischli's body buried in a field 10 miles from Thompson's apartment. The corpse had been wrapped in rope along with a sleeping bag and blanket, both taken from Thompson's apartment. Fleischli had been stabbed multiple times in the head, and she had been sexually assaulted. Fleischli's blood was later found on a carpet in Thompson's apartment, approximately six feet from his bed.

Both Thompson and Leitch were arrested several days after the murder. Fleischli was Leitch's former girlfriend. According to Thompson's account, he had consensual sex with Fleischli before he passed out. He said he woke up in the morning and Fleischli was gone, but her blood was left on the carpet near his bed. Both men were convicted of the murder in separate trials. The prosecution however accused Thompson of raping and killing Fleischli. Crucial evidence came from two previously convicted fellow inmates, John Del Frate and Edward Fink, who claimed to have heard Thompson admit while in jail to the rape and murder.

== Trial and execution ==
Leitch had threatened Fleischli in the past. Fibers and a shoe print linked him and his car to the dumping of the body. Leitch was sentenced to 15 years to life in 1985 for his alleged role in the murder after being convicted of second-degree murder. The deputy district attorney put forth the theory that Leitch was the man who wanted Fleischli killed, and that Thompson had killed her on Leitch's orders. A few weeks before her murder she had called a Laguna Beach police officer and told him that Leitch had threatened to kill her.

On November 4, 1983, Thompson was convicted by an Orange County Superior Court jury of the first-degree murder and forcible rape of Fleischli. On April 28, 1988, the California Supreme Court unanimously affirmed Thompson's rape and murder convictions and affirmed Thompson's death sentence with two of seven justices dissenting. After filing several unsuccessful habeas petitions with the California Supreme Court, Thompson was granted habeas relief as to his rape conviction by the United States District Court for the Central District of California, invalidating the death sentence on ineffective assistance of counsel grounds.

On June 19, 1996, a unanimous three-judge panel of the Court of Appeals for the Ninth Circuit reversed the District Court and reinstated Thompson's death sentence. The Court of Appeals panel noted that, given the strong evidence of rape presented by the State, Thompson could not demonstrate prejudice under the prevailing legal standard, even if the court accepted Thompson's ineffective assistance of counsel argument. The panel then denied Thompson's petition for rehearing en banc, and on June 11, 1997, the Court of Appeals issued its mandate denying all habeas relief in Thompson's case.

Subsequent habeas petitions by Thompson failed, until two days before Thompson was to be executed, when a divided en banc panel of the Court of Appeals recalled sua sponte the court's June 11, 1997 mandate. This occurred well after the Court's usual timeframe for reconsideration, and after the Supreme Court of the United States denied Thompson's petition for certiorari and the Governor of California conducted a clemency review. The State immediately appealed the recall to the Supreme Court, which granted certiorari in Calderon v. Thompson and ultimately reinstated Thompson's death sentence, calling the Court of Appeals' action a "grave abuse of discretion."

Thompson was executed by lethal injection on July 14, 1998, at San Quentin State Prison. His last meal was Alaskan king crab with melted butter, spinach salad, pork fried rice, Mandarin-style spare ribs, hot fudge sundae and a six-pack of Coca-Cola.

Donald Heller, the author of California's 1978 Proposition 7 (which increased the number of reasons for which an individual could be sentenced to death), became an opponent of the death penalty after the execution of Thompson.

== See also ==
- List of people executed in California
- List of people executed in the United States in 1998

Preceded by Keith Daniel Williams	Executions carried out in California	Succeeded by Jaturun Siripongs
