= List of people executed in California =

The following is a list of people executed by the U.S. state of California since capital punishment was resumed in the United States in 1976.

Since the 1976 U.S. Supreme Court decision of Gregg v. Georgia, the following 13 people convicted of murder have been executed by the state of California. The first 2 executions were by gas inhalation; all subsequent executions were by lethal injection, following a 1996 federal court (9th Circuit) ruling that the use of the gas chamber in California was unconstitutional. A further three people sentenced to death in California (Kelvin Shelby Malone, Alfredo Rolando Prieto, and Glen Edward Rogers) were executed in Missouri, Virginia, and Florida.

== List of people executed in California since 1976 ==
No.	Name	Race	Age	Sex	Date of execution	County	Method	Victim(s)	Governor
1	Robert Alton Harris	White	39	M	April 21, 1992	San Diego	Gas chamber	John Mayeski and Michael Baker	Pete Wilson
2	David Edwin Mason	White	36	M	August 24, 1993	Alameda	Gas chamber	5 murder victims (Note: The 5 victims were: Joan Picard, Arthur Jennings, Antionette Brown, Dorothy Land, and Boyd Johnson.)	Pete Wilson
3	William George Bonin	White	49	M	February 23, 1996	Los Angeles	Lethal injection	14 murder victims (Note: The 14 victims were: Marcus Grabs, Donald Hyden, David Murillo, Frank Fox, Charles Miranda, James McCabe, Ronald Gatlin, Harry Todd Turner, Russell Rugh, Glenn Barker, Steven Wood, Darin Lee Kendrick, Lawrence Sharp, and Steven Jay Wells.)	Pete Wilson
4	Keith Daniel Williams	White	48	M	May 3, 1996	Merced	Lethal injection	Lourdes Meza, Miguel Vargas, and Salvador Vargas	Pete Wilson
5	Thomas Martin Thompson	White	43	M	July 14, 1998	Orange	Lethal injection	Ginger Fleischli	Pete Wilson
6	Jaturun Siripongs	Asian	47	M	February 9, 1999	Orange	Lethal injection	Packovan Wattanaporn and Quach Nguyen	Gray Davis
7	Manuel Pina Babbitt	Black	50	M	May 4, 1999	Sacramento	Lethal injection	Leah Schendel	Gray Davis
8	Darrell Keith Rich	Native American	45	M	March 15, 2000	Shasta	Lethal injection	4 murder victims (Note: The 4 victims were: Annette Fay Edwards, Patricia Ann Moore, Linda Diane Slavik, and Annette Lynn Selix.)	Gray Davis
9	Robert Lee Massie	White	59	M	March 27, 2001	San Francisco	Lethal injection	Boris G. Naumoff	Gray Davis
10	Stephen Wayne Anderson	White	48	M	January 29, 2002	San Bernardino	Lethal injection	Elizabeth Lyman	Gray Davis
11	Donald Jay Beardslee	White	61	M	January 19, 2005	San Mateo	Lethal injection	Stacey Benjamin and Patty Geddling	Arnold Schwarzenegger
12	Stanley Tookie Williams	Black	51	M	December 13, 2005	Los Angeles	Lethal injection	4 murder victims (Note: The 4 victims were: Albert Owens, Yen-Yi Yang, Tsai-Shai Lin, and Yee-Chen Lin.)	Arnold Schwarzenegger
13	Clarence Ray Allen	Native American	76	M	January 17, 2006	Fresno	Lethal injection	4 murder victims (Note: The 4 victims were: Mary Sue Kitts, Bryon Schletewitz, Josephine Rocha, and Douglas White.)	Arnold Schwarzenegger

== Demographics ==
Race
White	8	63%
Black	2	15%
Native American	2	15%
Asian	1	8%
Age
30–39	2	15%
40–49	6	46%
50–59	3	23%
60–69	1	8%
70–79	1	8%
Sex
Male	13	100%
Date of execution
1976–1979	0	0%
1980–1989	0	0%
1990–1999	7	54%
2000–2009	6	46%
2010–2019	0	0%
2020–2029	0	0%
Method
Lethal injection	11	85%
Gas chamber	2	15%
Governor (Party)
Jerry Brown (D)	0	0%
George Deukmejian (R)	0	0%
Pete Wilson (R)	5	38%
Gray Davis (D)	5	38%
Arnold Schwarzenegger (R)	3	23%
Jerry Brown (D)	0	0%
Gavin Newsom (D)	0	0%
Total	13	100%

== See also ==
- Capital punishment in California
- Capital punishment in the United States
