= Special circumstances (criminal law) =

Concept in criminal law

Special circumstances in criminal law are actions of the accused, or conditions under which a crime, particularly homicide, was committed. Such factors require or allow for a more severe punishment.

Special circumstances are elements of the crime itself, and thus must be proven beyond a reasonable doubt during the guilt phase of the trial. As such, they are formally distinct from aggravating circumstances, in that the latter are proven during the penalty phase of the trial instead.

== United States ==
=== California ===
If a defendant is convicted of first-degree murder and one of 22 listed special circumstances are found to be true, the only possible penalties are life in prison without the possibility of parole or death (25 years to life if the defendant was a juvenile). As of March 2019, the Governor of California placed a moratorium on capital punishment. The 22 listed special circumstances are:

- The victim was a peace officer, federal law enforcement officer, or firefighter.
- The victim witnessed a crime and was killed to silence them.
- The victim was a judge, prosecutor, juror, or government official killed in retaliation or to prevent them from performing their duties.
- The defendant has one or more prior murder convictions.
- The defendant is convicted of multiple murders as part of the same trial, at least one of which is first-degree murder.
- The murder was committed for financial gain.
- The murder was committed by a bomb or destructive device.
- The murder was to prevent arrest or to escape.
- The murder was committed by lying in wait.
- The murder was committed via poison.
- The murder involved torturing the victim.
- The murder was carried out as part of a hate crime.
- The murder was of a witness of another crime.
- The murder was because of race, religion, or nationality.
- The murder was in the commission of a felony.
- The murder was committed in a drive-by shooting.
- The murder was committed by a street gang member.
- The murder was committed in the course of committing, attempting to commit, or immediately after committing specific felonies such as robbery, kidnapping, rape, or arson.

=== Connecticut ===
The state has eight conditions which can lead to a conviction of murder with special circumstances; all mandate life in prison without the possibility of parole.
