= Rahsaan Thomas =

American journalist

Rahsaan Thomas (born September 22, 1970) is an American-born journalist, known as "New York" on the podcast Ear Hustle. Thomas is the Executive Director of Empowerment Avenue, an organization that works to develop the careers of incarcerated writers, artists, journalists, and filmmakers pre-entry.

== Early life ==
Thomas was raised in the Brownsville neighborhood of Brooklyn, New York. He has two brothers. His mother, Jacqueline, completed her bachelor's degree in sociology and was a bureau chief at Rikers Island. His father was incarcerated before committing suicide while Thomas was a teenager. Thomas attended high school in Manhattan, Brooklyn, Queens, and Detroit.

== Career ==
While incarcerated at the San Quentin Rehabilitation Center, Thomas gained recognition through his work as co-host of the Ear Hustle podcast. He also developed a career as a writer and journalist. California Governor Gavin Newsom commuted Thomas' sentence on January 13, 2022. Thomas was released on Feb. 8, 2023.

=== Ear Hustle podcast ===
In 2018, Thomas became a co-host of Ear Hustle, the award-winning podcast produced inside San Quentin created by Earlonne Woods and Nigel Poor. In 2020, Woods, Poor, and Thomas were nominated for a Pulitzer Prize for Audio Reporting for their work on Ear Hustle Season 4. That same season, Ear Hustle was awarded the 2021 DuPont Award from the Columbia Journalism School.

=== Empowerment Avenue ===
Thomas, along with freelance writer Emily Nonko, created the nonprofit Empowerment Avenue in May 2020. Empowerment Avenue helps incarcerated writers, visual artists, and filmmakers develop their careers and conquer the challenges of getting published and compensated justly for their work. In 2022, Empowerment Avenue was awarded a $600,000 Imagining Freedom grant from the Mellon Foundation.

=== Writing ===
At San Quentin, Thomas was a contributing writer for the San Quentin News, and co-founded Prison Renaissance - through which he curated an art exhibit for the Museum of the African Diaspora (MoAD) in 2021. Thomas' work has been published by The Marshall Project, the Vera Institute for Justice, Business Insider, VICE, Outside Magazine, NBC, Open Campus, Apogee Journal, the Boston Globe and Current. While incarcerated, Thomas published over 50 articles, with 42 being published between June 2020 and his release in February 2023.

=== Film ===
The Sundance Institute and The Marshall Project awarded Thomas a grant to direct and produce the short documentary film Friendly Signs. Thomas completed the film while incarcerated. Friendly Signs premiered at the San Francisco Documentary Film Festival in 2023 and screened at Double Exposure, Atlanta Film Festival, BraveMaker Film Festival and Superfest Disability Documentary Film Festival where it received an Advocacy Award.

Thomas co-produced, What These Walls Won't Hold, directed by Adamu Chan, which won the Best Mid-Length Feature at the 2023 San Francisco International Film Festival and premiered on PBS America Reframed.

Thomas was a consulting producer for the 2026 documentary Crime and Punishment in America, directed by Lynn Novick and produced by Ken Burns. Novick said that she heard of Thomas through his podcast Ear Hustle, and when he was released in 2023 she asked him if he would participate in the film. Thomas subsequently not only was an interview subject, but was involved with screenings, shoots, and consultants’ meetings.

==== San Quentin Film Festival ====
Thomas is co-director and co-founder of the inaugural San Quentin Film Festival. The San Quentin Film Festival is the first film festival held inside of a prison in the United States. It took place at San Quentin in October 2024. Notable celebrity guests included Kerry Washington, who hosted a panel with Thomas, Jerry and Jessica Seinfeld, W. Kamau Bell and Cord Jefferson. In April 2025, Thomas and screenwriter Cori Thomas, who co-founded the San Quentin Film Festival with Thomas, were recognized as Impact Warriors by the Golden State Warriors for their work creating the festival. The second annual San Quentin Film Festival will take place on October 23-24, 2025.

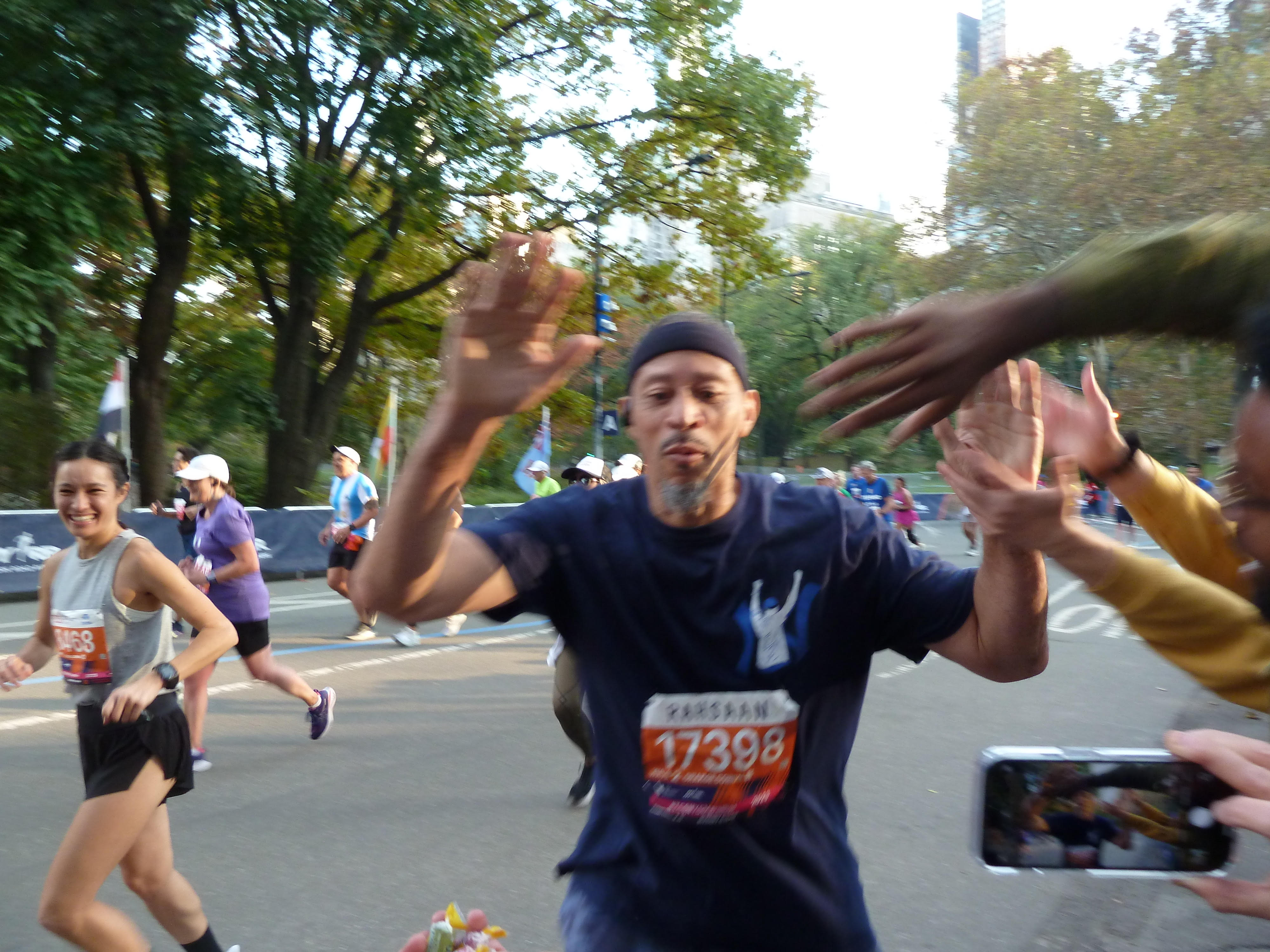
Thomas completing the 2023 New York City Marathon.

== Running and the 2023 New York City Marathon ==
Thomas began running while spending time with childhood friend Shannon Briggs in Big Bear, California where Briggs was preparing for his fight against Francois Botha. After being unable to keep up with Briggs during a three mile run, Thomas was inspired to develop his running skills. He was a member of the Thousand-Mile Club at San Quentin, an organized running club coached and sponsored by the Tamalpa Runners. During his time with the club, he completed three half marathons, and a full marathon in 2017 which was covered in the documentary 26.2 to Life. In 2023, his completion of the New York City Marathon was covered by NBC Nightly News, Runner's World, ESQUIRE Magazine, Outside Magazine, and the Brooklyn Paper.

== Social justice ==
=== NorCal SPJ - San Quentin Satellite Chapter ===
Thomas was a member of the 2017 inaugural 38-member cohort of the San Quentin Society of Professional Journalists NorCal Satellite Chapter (SQ-SJP), and served as chairman from 2018 to 2023. While chair, Thomas organized symposiums at San Quentin and invited journalists into the prison to discuss their coverage of prisons and people who have been impacted by the justice system. In 2021, Thomas penned an article for The Marshall Project's The Language Project entitled "We Are Worth the Extra Letters" in which he advocates for using people-first language and discontinuing use of the word "inmate." As chairman of SQ-SJP, Thomas received the John Gothberg Award for Meritorious Service in 2021 for his leadership in maintaining the flow of information in and out of San Quentin during the Covid 19 Pandemic lockdowns.

=== CA Prop 17 ===
Taina Vargas, founder of Initiate Justice, said that a 2017 call with Thomas motivated her to work on California Proposition 17, a successful 2020 ballot initiative that restored voting rights to people on parole in CA. Thomas served as an Initiate Justice Board Member, and designed the 2018 Voting Rights and Democracy Act.

== Works ==
Writing:

- "Why I Run in Prison". Outside. April 2017.
- "I've served 19 years in San Quentin prison and I just got diagnosed with COVID-19. Where is the justice?". Business Insider. August 2020.
- "A Question of Violence". The Marshall Project. December 2020.
- "Incarcerated people are telling their own stories more than ever before. It's about time.". NBCU Academy. May 2021.
- "What Did You Call Me?". Brennan Center for Justice. June 2021.
- "A Prison Reckoning with Remorse". Boston Globe. August 2021.
- "First Person: Why college matters for people serving extreme sentences". Open Campus. January 2022.
- "I Organized My First Art Show From Behind Bars. Here's How Incarcerated Curators Can Help Us See the World Differently". Artnet. April 2022.
- "My Wild and Winding Path to a College Degree Behind Bars". The Marshall Project. September 2022.
- "The Silent Treatment". Vera. January 2023.

Film:

- Friendly Signs. (2022). Director. Producer.
- 26.2 to Life: The San Quentin Marathon. (2022). Main Character.
- What These Walls Won't Hold. (2022). Co-Producer, Main Character.
- Crime and Punishment in America. (2026). Consulting producer and interviewee.

Audio:

- Ear Hustle Podcast. (2018–2023) Co host, Producer. (2023-present) Producer.
