= List of Wait Wait... Don't Tell Me! episodes (2022) =

The following is a list of episodes of Wait Wait... Don't Tell Me!, NPR's news panel game, that aired during 2022. All episodes, unless otherwise indicated, feature host Peter Sagal and announcer/scorekeeper Bill Kurtis. Dates indicated are the episodes' original Saturday air dates. Job titles and backgrounds of the guests reflect their status at the time of their appearance.

Thru the week of June 4, unless otherwise indicated, Wait Wait episodes were produced through the facilities of the show's co-producer, WBEZ/Chicago, with participants joining the show through Zoom links. From the episode of June 11 onward, also unless otherwise indicated, episodes originated with live audiences from its new regular home, the Studebaker Theatre at Chicago's Fine Arts Building. (The program had originated from the Chase Auditorium from 2005 until just before the COVID-19 pandemic commenced in early 2020.)

== January ==
Date	Guest	Panelists	Notes
January 1	"Best of" episode featuring basketball stars Brook & Robin Lopez and actors André De Shields, Martin Short, & Jane Kaczmarek		
January 8	Astronaut Woody Hoburg	Alonzo Bodden, Peter Grosz, Roxanne Roberts	
January 15	Singer/songwriter Kacey Musgraves	Emmy Blotnick, Helen Hong, Maz Jobrani	
January 22	Actor Brian Cox	Cristela Alonzo, Paula Poundstone, Mo Rocca	
January 29	Playwright Jeremy O. Harris	Karen Chee, Josh Gondelman, Alzo Slade	Guest host Negin Farsad

== February ==
Date	Guest	Panelists	Notes
February 5	Shermann "Dilla" Thomas, presenter of a TikTok series on Chicago's history	Adam Burke, Tom Papa, Paula Poundstone	Show recorded at Chicago's Harris Theater
February 12	Musician Patti Smith	Bobcat Goldthwait, Maeve Higgins, Hari Kondabolu	
February 19	Novelist Marlon James	Negin Farsad, Peter Grosz, Ashley Ray	Includes tributes to panelist P. J. O'Rourke (d. February 15, 2022)
February 26	"Best of" episode featuring actor Ed Begley, Jr., journalist Yamiche Alcindor, chef Antoni Porowski, and rapper/actor RZA		Includes tributes to panelist P. J. O'Rourke (d. February 15, 2022)

== March ==
Date	Guest	Panelists	Notes
March 5	Television personality Porsha Williams	Joel Kim Booster, Hari Kondabolu, Faith Salie	Show recorded in Atlanta, GA (Fox Theatre); Guest announcer/scorekeeper Chioke I'Anson
March 12	Bobsledder Elana Meyers Taylor	Negin Farsad, Paula Poundstone, Alzo Slade	
March 19	Actress Zazie Beetz	Roy Blount, Jr., Helen Hong, Mo Rocca	
March 26	Historian Dan Snow	Emmy Blotnick, Luke Burbank, Roxanne Roberts	

== April ==
Date	Guest	Panelists	Notes
April 2	Musician Slash	Cristela Alonzo, Maeve Higgins, Tom Papa	
April 9	Actor Matt Walsh	Alonzo Bodden, Karen Chee, Helen Hong	Show recorded at Chicago's Harris Theater
April 16	"Best of" episode featuring actors Bashir & Sultan Salahuddin, musicians Chance the Rapper & Michelle Zauner, and hockey star P. K. Subban		
April 23	Actor/writer Stephen Merchant	Maz Jobrani, Ashley Ray, Faith Salie	
April 30	Vermiculturist Myles Stubblefield	Maeve Higgins, Amy Dickinson, Alzo Slade	Show recorded in Buffalo, NY (Shea's Performing Arts Center)

== May ==
Date	Guest	Panelists	Notes
May 7	Actor Adam Scott	Emmy Blotnick, Maz Jobrani, Paula Poundstone	
May 14	Comedian/actress Hannah Einbinder	Peter Grosz, Laci Mosley, Faith Salie	
May 21	Singer/actress Mandy Moore	Alonzo Bodden, Maeve Higgins, Tom Papa	
May 28	Earlonne Woods and Nigel Poor, co-hosts of the Ear Hustle podcast	Maz Jobrani, Paula Poundstone, Adam Burke	Show recorded in San Francisco, CA (Sydney Goldstein Theater)

== June ==
Date	Guest	Panelists	Notes
June 4	Previously unaired panel segments "Farewell to Zoom" "best of" episode featuring musician Kacey Musgraves, actors Audra McDonald & Brian Cox, and astronaut Woody Hoburg		
June 11	Actor Kenan Thompson	Luke Burbank, Negin Farsad, Hari Kondabolu	Wait Wait's first episode at the Studebaker Theatre
June 18	Actor Sean Hayes	Brian Babylon, Bobcat Goldthwait, Maeve Higgins	
June 25	Writers/producers Dan Perrault and Tony Yacenda	Adam Burke, Peter Grosz, Helen Hong	

== July ==
Date	Guest	Panelists	Notes
July 2	Graffiti artist Darryl "Cornbread" McCray	Alonzo Bodden, Josh Gondelman, Faith Salie	Show recorded in Philadelphia, PA (Mann Center)
July 9	Previously unaired segments, including an interview with rapper Del Tha Funkee Homosapien; Encore segments including interviews with musician Slash and historian Dan Snow		
July 16	Pitchfork editor-in-chief Puja Patel	Emmy Blotnick, Adam Burke, Paula Poundstone	Guest host Tom Papa
July 23	Actor Nathan Lane	Josh Gondelman, Cristela Alonzo, Matt Rogers	Guest host Tom Papa
July 30	Actor Jeremy Allen White	Faith Salie, Bobcat Goldthwait, Helen Hong	Guest host Tom Papa

== August ==
Date	Guest	Panelists	Notes
August 6	Comedian/writer Robin Thede	Adam Burke, Amy Dickinson, Hari Kondabolu	Guest host Negin Farsad
August 13	"Live and in-person" "best of" episode featuring actors Steve Buscemi, Aidy Bryant, Alan Cumming & Jeff Daniels and drummer Lars Ulrich		
August 20	"Best of" episode featuring conductor Marin Alsop, choreographer Garth Fagan, drag performer Peaches Christ, and singers Renée Fleming & Josh Groban		
August 27	Delegate to the U.S. House of Representatives from the District of Columbia Eleanor Holmes Norton	Alzo Slade, Roxanne Roberts, Tom Bodett	Show recorded in Vienna, VA (Wolf Trap)

== September ==
Date	Guest	Panelists
September 3	Comedian Chris Estrada	Maeve Higgins, Skyler Higley, Mo Rocca
September 10	Comedian Abbi Jacobson	Luke Burbank, Paula Poundstone, Faith Salie
September 17	Comedian Mohammed Amer	Roy Blount Jr., Adam Burke, Helen Hong
September 24	TV personality and Pro Football Hall of Fame defensive end Michael Strahan	Karen Chee, Negin Farsad, Shane O'Neill

== October ==
Date	Guest	Panelists	Notes
October 1	Writer/comedian Julio Torres	Hari Kondabolu, Tom Papa, Dulcé Sloan	
October 8	Actor Ralph Macchio	Emmy Blotnick, Adam Felber, Alzo Slade	
October 15	Previously unaired segments, including an interview with U.S. Surgeon General Vivek Murthy; Encore segments including interviews with actors Jeremy Allen White and Mandy Moore		
October 22	Author/activist Ibram X. Kendi	Alonzo Bodden, Amy Dickinson, Josh Gondelman	Show recorded in Boston, MA (Wang Theatre)
October 29	Comedian Hasan Minhaj	Helen Hong, Shane O'Neill, Mo Rocca	

== November ==
Date	Guest	Panelists	Notes
November 5	Late-night TV personality Amber Ruffin	Karen Chee, Maz Jobrani, Hari Kondabolu	
November 12	Actor/comedian Craig Robinson	Brian Babylon, Negin Farsad, Tom Papa	
November 19	Freddie Johnson, brand ambassador and tour guide at the Buffalo Trace Distillery	Adam Burke, Paula Poundstone, Alzo Slade	Show recorded in Louisville, KY (Palace Theatre)
November 26	"Best of" episode featuring actor Nathan Lane, Pitchfork editor-in-chief Puja Patel, graffiti artist Darryl "Cornbread" McCray, and playwright Jeremy O. Harris		

== December ==
Date	Guest	Panelists	Notes
December 3	Actor/comedian Dana Carvey	Josh Gondelman, Skyler Higley, Paula Poundstone	
December 10	Television personality Gayle King	Negin Farsad, Peter Grosz, Faith Salie	Show recorded in New York City, NY (Carnegie Hall)
December 17	Musician Andrew Bird	Adam Burke, Zainab Johnson, Tom Papa	
December 24	Actress/director Sarah Polley	Adam Burke, Roxanne Roberts, Shane O'Neill	Guest announcer/scorekeeper Chioke I'Anson
December 31	"Best of 2022" episode featuring actors Ralph Macchio & Matt Walsh, U.S. House delegate for D.C. Eleanor Holmes Norton, and podcast hosts Earlonne Woods & Nigel Poor		
