= This Is Ear Hustle =

2021 non-fiction book by Nigel Poor and Earlonne Woods

This is Ear Hustle: Unflinching Stories of Everyday Prison Life
- First edition (US)
- Author: Nigel Poor and Earlonne Woods
- Illustrator: Damien Linnane
- Cover artist: Cal Tabuena Frolli
- Publisher: Crown Publishing Group
- Publication date: 19 October 2021
- Publication place: United States
- Pages: 294
- ISBN: 978-0593238868

This is Ear Hustle: Unflinching Stories of Everyday Prison Life is a non-fiction book about the podcast Ear Hustle, written by Ear Hustle co-hosts Nigel Poor and Earlonne Woods and published in 2021 by Crown Publishing Group. The book both expands on topics covered in the podcast, and also explores new topics that the podcast deliberately avoids, such as the background of the authors. The book received positive reviews.

== Content ==
The book is presented in three parts. The first part, 'Let's Do This', is written in memoir format. It covers Nigel Poor's background and journey to teaching photography at San Quentin State Prison, the circumstances leading to Earlonne Woods' incarceration at the prison, and the formation of Ear Hustle. The second section, 'We're Gonna Take You Inside', shares the experiences of other people at San Quentin. Topics discussed include prison marriage, prison race-relations and three-strikes laws. Topics covered in the third section, 'Inside Out', include Woods journey to getting his sentence commutated in 2018, and the consequences of being unable to continue recording Ear Hustle in San Quentin during the COVID-19 pandemic. Some parts of the book have the prose presented in transcript form, and expand on stories originally covered in the podcast with additional context.

== Production ==
Woods stated the COVID-19 pandemic served as a convenient time to work on the book, as San Quentin was on lockdown and both he and Poor were unable to work on the podcast as usual. Transcripts presented in the book were a combination of audio captured for the podcast, and new material gathered specifically for the book. Woods estimated 80% of transcript content was new. The book also served as a way to explore topics the podcast deliberately avoids, such as commenting on policy in regards to three-strikes law, the difficulties faced in starting the podcast, and the background of Woods. Woods and Poor spoke positively of the experience of writing the book; they also voiced their respective sections in the audio-book version. Other voices in the audio-book were a combination of people voicing their own transcripts, and paid actors. Australian author and illustrator Damien Linnane was offered the contract to illustrate the book, after choosing Woods as a subject for an art exhibition where the theme was people who used their time in prison constructively, and tagging him in the portrait on Instagram.

== Reception ==
Samantha Schoech from the San Francisco Chronicle praised the book for expanding on the background story of Woods more than the podcast, and for its impartiality, saying it was "not pro-prisoner or anti-prison; it is staunchly pro-human ... [and] is successful precisely because of this." Nimah Gobir from KQED Inc. commented that the book expanded on educational opportunities for students already given by the podcast; many educators use Ear Hustle episodes as springboards for classroom activities. Aperture said the book gave a "poignant narrative" that allowed readers to connect to incarcerated people in "surprisingly relatable ways". Stephanie Sendaula from Library Journal gave a positive review, saying even those unfamiliar with the podcast would be "absorbed by Poor and Woods’s storytelling", also describing Linnane's illustrations as a highlight of the book.
