= Prison Journalism Project =

- Formation: April 2020; 6 years ago
- Founder: Yukari Iwatani Kane; Shaheen Pasha
- Type: Nonprofit
- Purpose: Education; Journalism; Criminal Justice
- Website: prisonjournalismproject.org

Prison Journalism Project is an independent, nonprofit organization founded in April 2020 to train incarcerated writers to be journalists and publish their stories. Prison Journalism Project provides correspondence-based lessons on the tools of journalism to incarcerated writers through its PJP J-School program, and it publishes their stories on its online magazine.

Prison Journalism Project contributes to the movement for prison reform through two programs: PJP J-School and an editorial publishing arm. It recruits, trains and pays incarcerated and formerly incarcerated writers, then publishes their work on their own online magazine and training newspaper as well as in publications around the country to help cultivate freedom of the press behind the walls as it builds a network of prison correspondents.

One of its contributing writers, Steve Brooks, who is incarcerated at San Quentin State Prison for sexual assault became the first incarcerated writer to win an individual award in the print category of Society of Professional Journalist's Northern California Chapter's 2020 Excellence in Journalism Award for two opinion essays published on Prison Journalism Project.

== Background ==
Prison Journalism Project was founded in 2020 by Yukari Iwatani Kane and Shaheen Pasha, who were teaching journalism at San Quentin State Prison and Hampshire County Jail in Massachusetts.

When the COVID-19 pandemic hit, Kane and Pasha saw how little information was coming out of prisons about situations inside, so they started a publication on Medium in April 2020 to publish experiences and dispatches about the coronavirus’ impact on incarceration.

Prison Journalism Project also publishes PJPxInside, a print publication distributed to the outlet's writers in prisons and jails across the United States. The pilot edition won an Award of Excellence from the Society of News Design in March 2022. In September 2022, PJPxInside received the Community Champion Award in the small newsroom division from the Institute of Nonprofit News.

In December 2020, it became a member of the Institute for Nonprofit News. In April 2021, it partnered with the Society of Professional Journalists to create the first national virtual incarcerated chapter. In July 2021, Crime Story Media began republishing stories from the Prison Journalism Project website. Prison Journalism Project writers have also been published by The Washington Post.

The organization is funded by individual donations and grants from foundations and individuals. In February 2022, The Just Trust named Prison Journalism Project as one of its inaugural grantees. It was also awarded a grant by FWD.us.

== See also ==
- Prison newspaper
