= Prison newspaper =

Newspaper created for or printed by incarcerated people

Prison newspapers are newspapers created within a prison, typically by the incarcerated people living there.

== History ==
The first prison newspaper is believed to have appeared in the 19th century in a debtors' prison. Prison reformers in the US created a prison newspaper at the Elmira Reformatory in 1883. It was "carefully assembled not to include items that officials deemed to have a bad influence on the inmates" and was instead intended for rehabilitative purposes. The first inmate-driven paper was created at the Minnesota Correctional Facility in 1887.

A 1935 study, the first on the topic, found that almost half of US prisons had a prison newspaper. The genre reached its height in the 1960s in the United States, at which point circulation was approximately 2 million readers across 250 publications.During this period "active and alert prison reporting" became more common, with inmates highlighting problems within the prison system. The "Pulitzers of prison journalism", the Penal Press Awards, were awarded annually beginning in 1965.

However, they faced issues around freedom of the press, as critiques of prison practices were met with institutional censorship.In 1974, in the US Supreme Court case of Pell v. Procunier, the court ruled to uphold a California state restriction against prison inmates being interviewed face-to-face by the press. Journalists and inmates had contended that this restriction violated the First Amendment. This ruling "largely replaced" earlier precedents supportive of prison reporting; subsequent court decisions also held that "the prison's security interests trumped the free speech rights of inmates" and that prisons could entirely forbid prison newspapers. Similar patterns and tensions emerged in other parts of the world, such as Canada. These pressures resulted in a quick and significant decline in the number of prison newspapers in publication between the 1970s and 1990s, with just six operating in 1998. However, more recently, "alongside a surge in bipartisan interest in criminal justice reform, prison journalism has reemerged and garnered the attention and support of funders, politicians, and the public". As of 2023 there are an estimated 24 prison newspapers in the US.

== Reporting ==
Early prison newspapers were typically "devoted to inmate activities: sports events, movies and other entertainment, personal items, blood banks, school and organizational activities, hobbies, and the like". Humour was also often featured. Sports remain a popular topic of reporting. Depending on the level of censorship at a particular institution, such papers may carry stories critical of the prison administration. With the modern aging prison population in the US, obituaries have also become a feature.

Challenges within the prison system, including potential reprisals against prison journalists, complicate reporting. The US Federal Bureau of Prisons has an explicit ban on journalism by inmates, while most US states have restrictions that negatively impact journalism from within jails.

== Notable examples ==
- Forlorn Hope was the first prison newspaper in the US, created in 1800.
- The Prison Mirror, first published in 1887, is the oldest continuously operating prison newspaper.
- The Angolite, the prison newspaper of the Louisiana State Penitentiary, has won numerous journalism awards including the George Polk Award and a nomination for a National Magazine Award.
- The San Quentin News from San Quentin State Prison is the subject of a 2020 book by journalism professor William J. Drummond.
- The Prison Journalism Project maintains a partial directory of active prison newspapers in the United States.
