= Cosey =

Cosey is both a given name and surname. Notable people with the name include:

== Given name ==
- Cosey Coleman, American football player
- Cosey Fanni Tutti, British performance artist and musician

== Surname ==
- Glenn Cosey, American basketball player
- Joseph Cosey, American forger
- Pete Cosey, American guitarist
- Quenton DeCosey, American basketball player
- Ray Cosey, American baseball player
- Tony Cosey, American long-distance runner

== Pseudonym ==
- Cosey, Swiss comics artist
