= Nigel Poor =

American photographer and podcaster

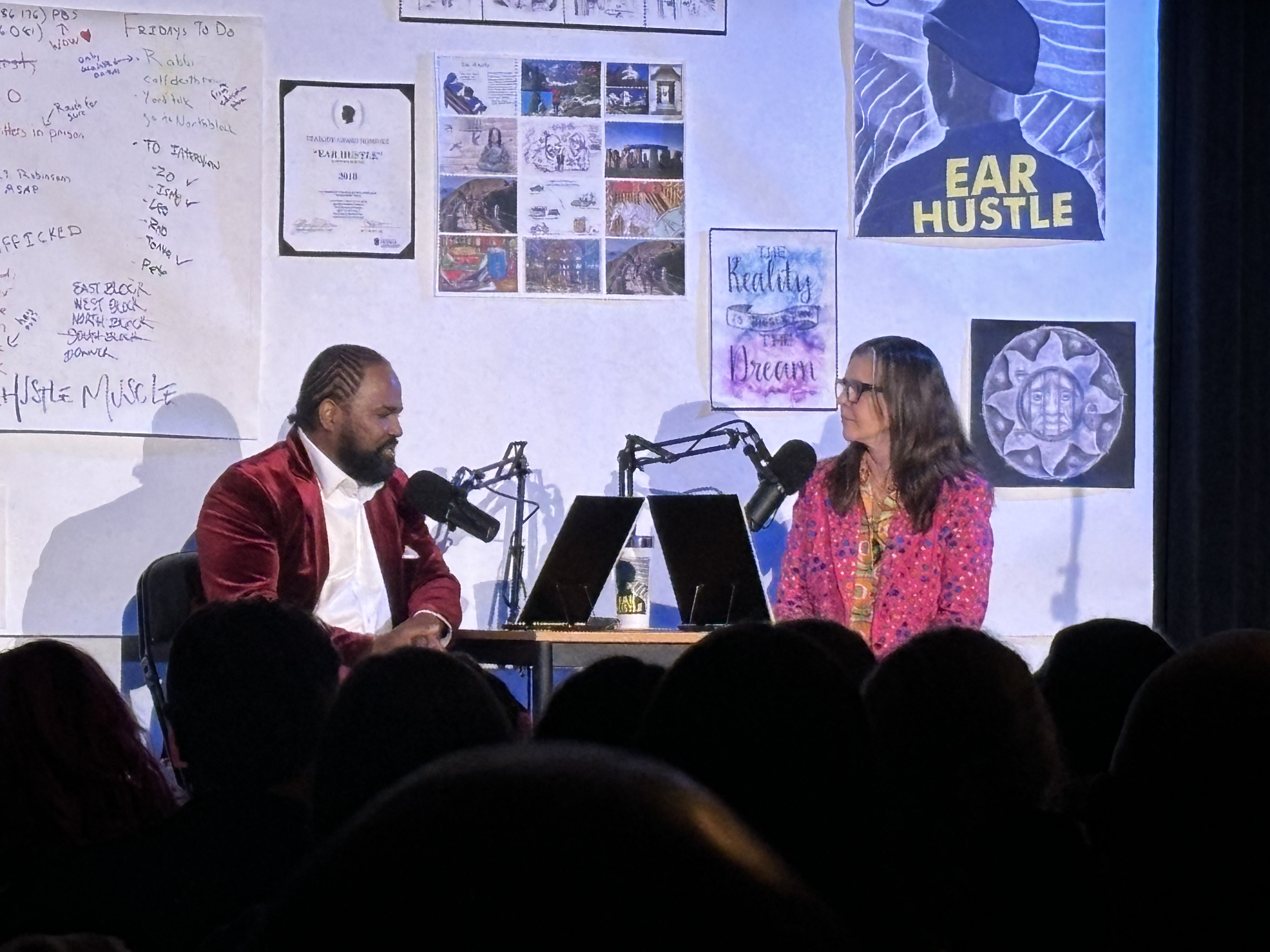
Earlonne Woods and Nigel Poor in 2023.

Nigel Poor is an artist and cofounder and co-host of the podcast Ear Hustle. She is co-author of the book This Is Ear Hustle: Unflinching Stories of Everyday Prison Life. She lives in the San Francisco Bay area.

== Early life and education ==
Poor grew up near Boston. She has a B.A. in Photography and Literature from Bennington College in Vermont, and an M.F.A in Photography from Massachusetts College of Art.

== Career ==
Poor began volunteering at San Quentin State Prison in 2011 as a photography teacher with the Prison University Project. From her work in photography came the idea for The San Quentin Prison Report Radio Project, the precursor to Ear Hustle.

She is a Professor of Photography at California State University, Sacramento.

Poor's photography has been exhibited locally, nationally, and internationally. She created a series of photographs based on an archive of photos from San Quentin, in which incarcerated men annotated the photographs with their own impressions and context.

Poor and her co-hosts were nominated for a Pulitzer Prize in 2020 for Season 4 of Ear Hustle.
