= Joseph Cosey =

American forger

- Born: Martin Coneely; February 18, 1887; Syracuse, New York, United States
- Died: 1950 (aged 62–63)
- Occupation: forger
- Known for: mimicking the handwriting of historical American figures
- Notable work: forgery of Thomas Jefferson's supposed draft of the Declaration of Independence

Joseph Cosey (February 18, 1887 – 1950) is the favorite alias of notorious forger Martin Coneely. He was very skilled at mimicking the handwriting of historical American figures.

== Early life ==
Joseph Cosey was born Martin Coneely on February 18, 1887, in Syracuse, New York. He was the son of Irish Catholic immigrant Robert Coneely, a "cabinetmaker by trade", and Sarah Bease of Virginia. He did very well in elementary and high school, but left home at the age of 17 after quarreling with his father.

Cosey worked as a printer's apprentice (he had helped his older brother Robert in his printing shop), wandering from place to place and job to job. In each place, he would use the local library to satisfy his interest in 19th-century American history.

He joined the United States Army in 1909, and "was sent to the Philippines as a private with Company G, 19th Infantry." He was dishonorably discharged four years later for assaulting the company cook. He forged a certificate of honorable discharge.

== Forger ==
Cosey was caught and sentenced several times for various crimes, including motorcycle theft, forging checks and using fake delivery receipts to steal $30,000 in negotiable bonds. Cosey used various false names. He served around ten years in various prisons, including San Quentin, and was released in the late 1920s.

Cosey's career of historical forgery began by chance. In 1929, he went to the Library of Congress and asked to see some old documents; he stole a pay warrant endorsed by Benjamin Franklin in 1786. When he tried to sell it to a New York City book dealer, however, the dealer told him it was a fake. Stung, Cosey practiced forging signatures for several months and then sold the same dealer a scrap of paper with the writing "Yrs. Truly, A. Lincoln" for $10.

Cosey forged signatures, entire letters and manuscripts of such historical figures as George Washington, James Monroe, Button Gwinnett, and Mark Twain. Several fake Lincoln letters were produced, as well as Thomas Jefferson's supposed draft of the Declaration of Independence. As time went on, he occasionally composed his own documents rather than simply copy authentic ones.

He used old paper, brown ink and writing implements that the contemporary writer would have used - this made his documents so convincing that they fooled several experts. Cosey rarely victimized amateur collectors, often stating "I take pleasure in fooling the professionals". He was so prolific and good that, in 1934, the New York Public Library set up the Cosey Collection to both alert the public and remove his work from circulation.

Even with the considerations Cosey made to give his forgeries the look of authentic documents, he eventually made mistakes. One such involved his use of the style that the historical figure would have used in their prime, when the date of the document would have called for the writer's hands to tremble with old age. Later forgeries were also easier to spot; Cosey began to use modern chemicals to age modern paper.

Cosey was arrested in 1937 after selling a fake letter (supposedly from Abraham Lincoln) to a stamp dealer. The dealer analyzed the letter and discovered the forgery. Cosey confessed his crimes and was eventually sentenced to three years in prison. He was released in less than a year, and continued to make forgeries into the 1940s.

== Impact ==
Several forgeries produced by Joseph Cosey are most likely still in circulation. Over the years, they have become valuable collector's items in their own right. According to historian, Nathan Raab, examples of his work, as known forgeries, are held in various collections, among them the Alfred Whital Stern Collection of Lincolniana in the Library of Congress. The noted collector A. S. W. Rosenbach was proud to have a Cosey forgery of two verses from Edgar Allan Poe's poem "The Raven".
