= Mount Tamalpais College =

Liberal arts college in San Quentin, California, U.S.

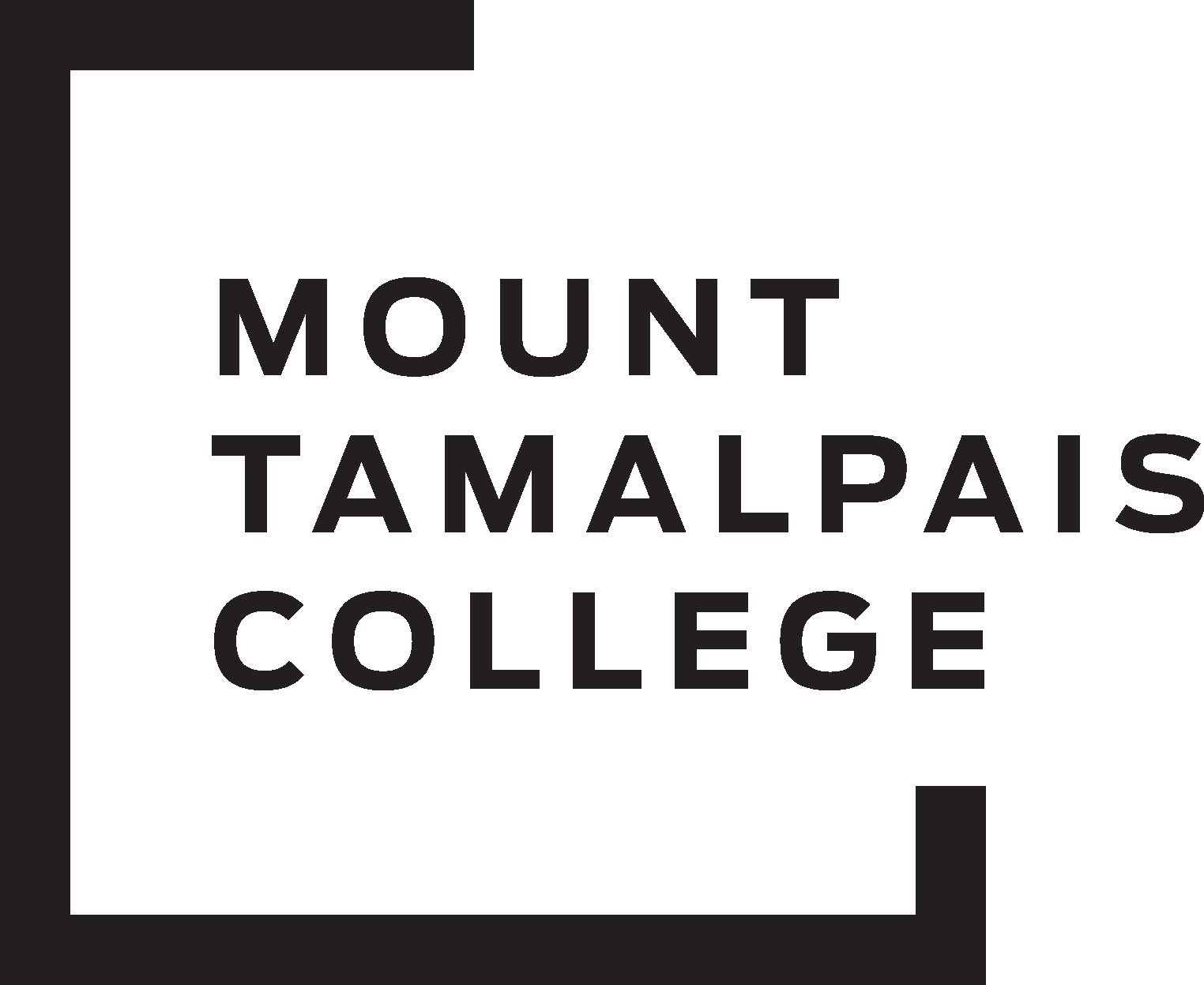
- Formation: 2003
- Type: 501(c)(3) non-profit organization
- Location: San Quentin, California
- Executive Director: Jody Lewen
- Budget: $3,000,000
- Staff: 29
- Volunteers: over 350
- Website: www.mttamcollege.edu
- Formerly called: Prison University Project

Mount Tamalpais College, formerly known as the Prison University Project, is a two year liberal arts college that offers an associate's degree program in Liberal Arts and intensive college preparatory courses in math and writing to mainline residents of San Quentin Rehabilitation Center. Courses are all taught on-site by volunteers, most of them graduate students, instructors, and faculty members from San Francisco Bay Area colleges and universities. Until 2020, the college was operated as an extension site of Patten University by the Prison University Project, a 501(c)(3) non-profit organization. All credits and degrees were issued by Patten. Since 2020, Mount Tamalpais College has issued its own credits and degrees as a Candidate for Accreditation by the Accrediting Commission for Community and Junior Colleges. The college achieved Initial Accreditation in January 2022.

In addition to its academic programs and support services for students, Mount Tamalpais College disseminates information on prison education to the public at large. From November 2007 to January 2008 it organized an exhibition at the San Francisco Public Library, including photographs by Heather Rowley of everyday scenes at San Quentin and essays by students in the College Program about their experiences; a similar exhibition on Alcatraz Island ran from June 1 to October 22, 2008. The Prison University Project received the National Humanities Medal from President Obama in September 2016.

== Background ==
The Prison University Project has its origins in the aftermath of the 1994 Violent Crime Control and Law Enforcement Act, which made it illegal for prisoners to receive Pell Grants, reducing the number of college degree-granting programs in United States prisons from its peak of over 350 to fewer than 10. The College Program at San Quentin was founded in fall of 1996, based entirely on volunteer teaching and organization. As the College Program expanded and efforts to raise funds increased, the Prison University Project was founded in 2003. It changed its name to Mount Tamalpais College in 2020.

== The College Program at San Quentin ==
About 300 student inmates are enrolled in the College Program at San Quentin each semester. A high school diploma or its equivalent is required to participate, but most students nevertheless begin with the College Program's non-credit preparatory courses in Mathematics and English. Associate's degree course offerings have included Calculus, Biology, Environmental Science, Chemistry, English, and Composition. 20 courses are offered per semester. Most courses are worth 3 credits, with 60 being required for graduation. Courses are student centered and culturally responsive, and Mount Tamalpais College staff assists instructors and tutors in maintaining these practices through trainings, syllabus consultation, and semester-long support. Students pay no fees or tuition. All textbooks and school supplies are provided by the program and through donations from publishers. As of 2018, 162 men had completed their degrees at San Quentin.

The College Program has been cited by both instructors and student inmates, as well as corrections officers, as exerting a positive influence on the lives of participants and improving their chances of contributing productively to society upon their release. Prison officials and inmates believe that the program helps make the environment inside San Quentin safer, and inmates and their families say that the program has inspired inmates' children to better educate themselves and help break the cycle of intergenerational crime and incarceration.
