= San Quentin News =

San Quentin State Prison newspaper

- Written by the Incarcerated
- Type: Prison newspaper
- Founder: Clinton Duffy
- Founded: 1940
- Language: English
- City: San Quentin, California
- Circulation: 35,000 (as of 2022)
- Website: sanquentinnews.com

The San Quentin News is a non-profit, monthly prison newspaper written and edited by inmates at San Quentin State Prison in California and published by the Pollen Initiative.

== History ==
The San Quentin News was founded in 1940 by Clinton Duffy, the then warden of San Quentin State Prison, as an inmate-edited newspaper. The newspaper had a spotty publication record until completely closing in the 1990s. It was reestablished in 2008 by warden Robert Ayers, Jr. and, as of 2014, had a print circulation of 11,500. By 2022 this had grown to a circulation of 35,000, with copies of the newspaper distributed to inmates at 36 California state prisons and some jails.

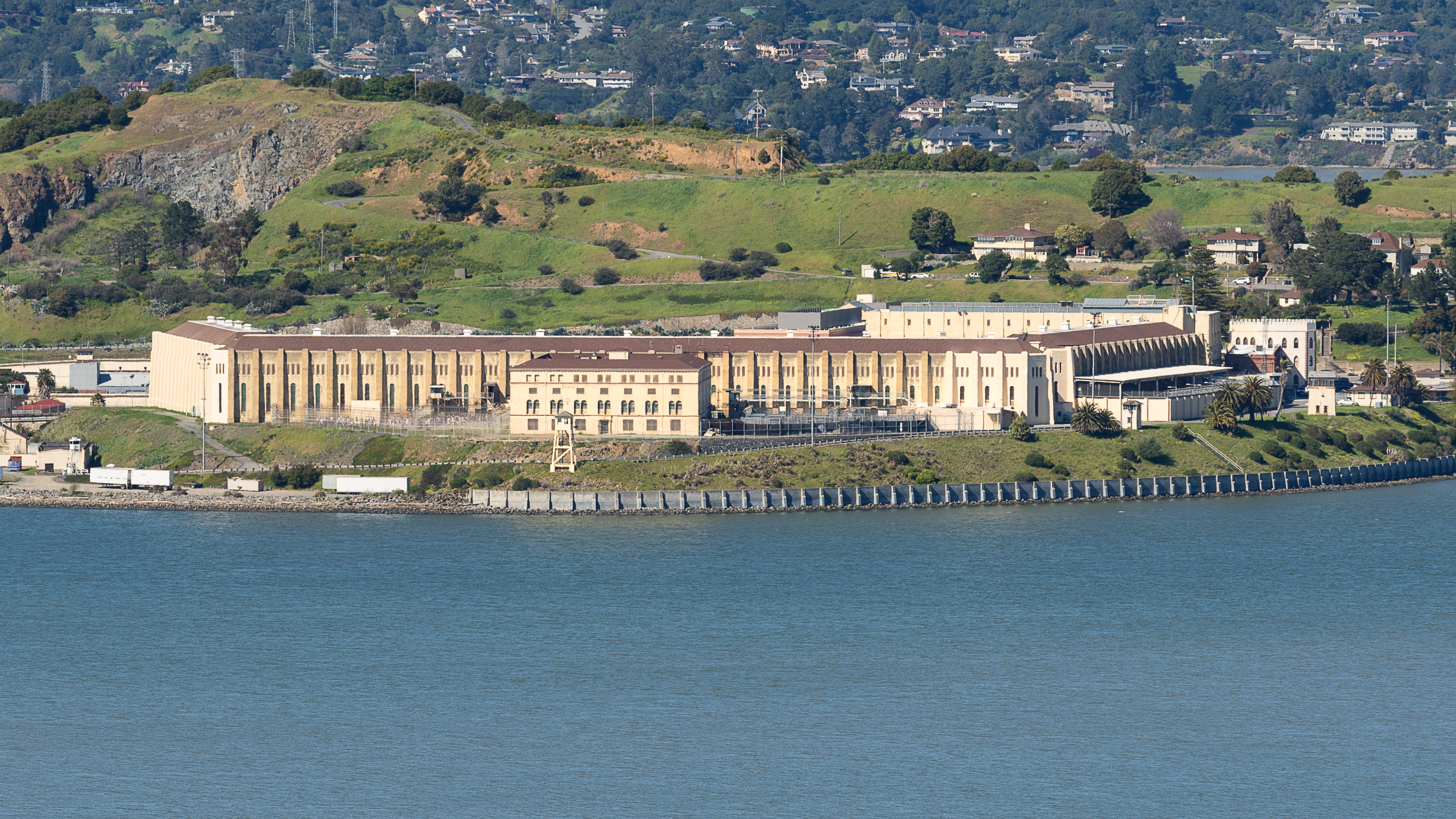
The San Quentin News is written and edited by inmates at San Quentin State Prison in California (pictured).

The San Quentin News is published by the Pollen Initiative.

== Content ==
The San Quentin News covers local sports, prison entertainment, and correctional policies. All content published by the newspaper is subject to pre-publication review by the California Department of Corrections and Rehabilitation and, in 2014, the publication was suspended for more than a month after newspaper staff substituted an approved photograph with an unapproved photograph.

The San Quentin News is a member outlet of the Institute for Nonprofit News.
