= Nathan Raab =

- Education: The Haverford School, University of Pennsylvania
- Occupations: Historian, Author
- Known for: President of The Raab Collection, Author of The Hunt for History
- Notable work: The Hunt for History
- Website: www.raabcollection.com

Nathan Raab is an American historian, rare books seller and author, best known for his work with rare historical documents. He is the president of The Raab Collection, a firm that specializes in the acquisition and sale of significant historical manuscripts.

== Early life and education ==
Raab graduated from The Haverford School in 1996. He later received his undergraduate degree from the University of Pennsylvania.

== Career ==
Raab joined The Raab Collection, which was founded by his parents, and eventually became its president. In this role, he has worked with major institutions and private collectors to authenticate and sell documents associated with figures such as Abraham Lincoln, Thomas Jefferson, George Washington, John F. Kennedy, Albert Einstein, Ronald Reagan, and more.

He has written articles for publications including Forbes and The New York Times, and has appeared in media segments on networks such as CNN and CBS.

== Publications ==
In 2020, Raab co-authored the book The Hunt for History with Luke Barr. The book details his experiences locating and authenticating historical artifacts.

== Personal life ==
Raab resides in Pennsylvania and is an active member of the Jewish community.
