= Ear Hustle =

Audio documentary podcast

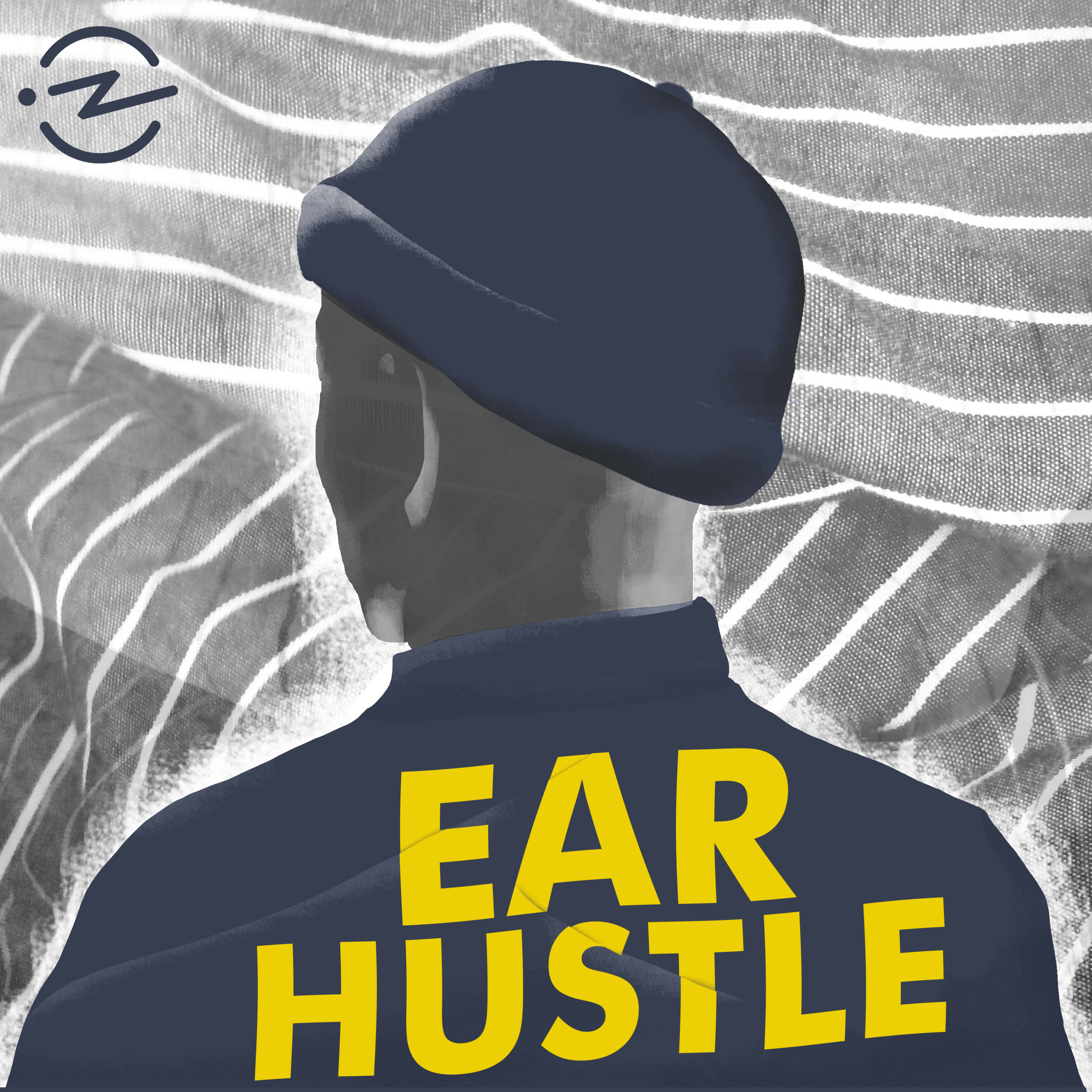
- Genre: Documentary
- Format: Audio
- Language: English

Cast and voices
- Hosted by: Earlonne Woods; Nigel Poor; Rahsaan "New York" Thomas

Music
- Theme music composed by: David Jassy

Production
- Production: Earlonne Woods; Rahsaan "New York" Thomas; Nigel Poor; John "Yahya" Johnson; Julie Shapiro; Bruce Wallace; Amy Standen; Shabnam Sigman; Antwan Williams
- Length: 5–95 minutes

Technical specifications
- Audio format: MP3

Publication
- No. of seasons: 14
- No. of episodes: 117
- Original release: May 25, 2017
- Provider: Radiotopia
- Updates: Bi-monthly

Related
- Website: earhustlesq.com

Ear Hustle is a non-fiction podcast about prison life and life after incarceration created by Earlonne Woods and Antwan Williams, both formerly incarcerated, and Nigel Poor, an artist who volunteers at San Quentin State Prison. In 2016, it was selected by the Radiotopia network as the winner of its Podquest competition, and the following year released its first season. It was the first podcast to be entirely created and produced inside a prison.

In 2018, California governor Jerry Brown commuted Earlonne Woods' sentence, citing Ear Hustle as a significant contributor to his reformation as an American citizen. Since his release, Woods has continued to co-host the podcast with Poor from outside prison, with Poor recording some parts in San Quentin with new co-host Rahsaan "New York" Thomas. Ear Hustle was a finalist for the 2020 Pulitzer Prize for Audio Reporting, and won a Alfred I. duPont–Columbia University Award in 2021. Its fourteenth season began airing in September 2024.

== History ==
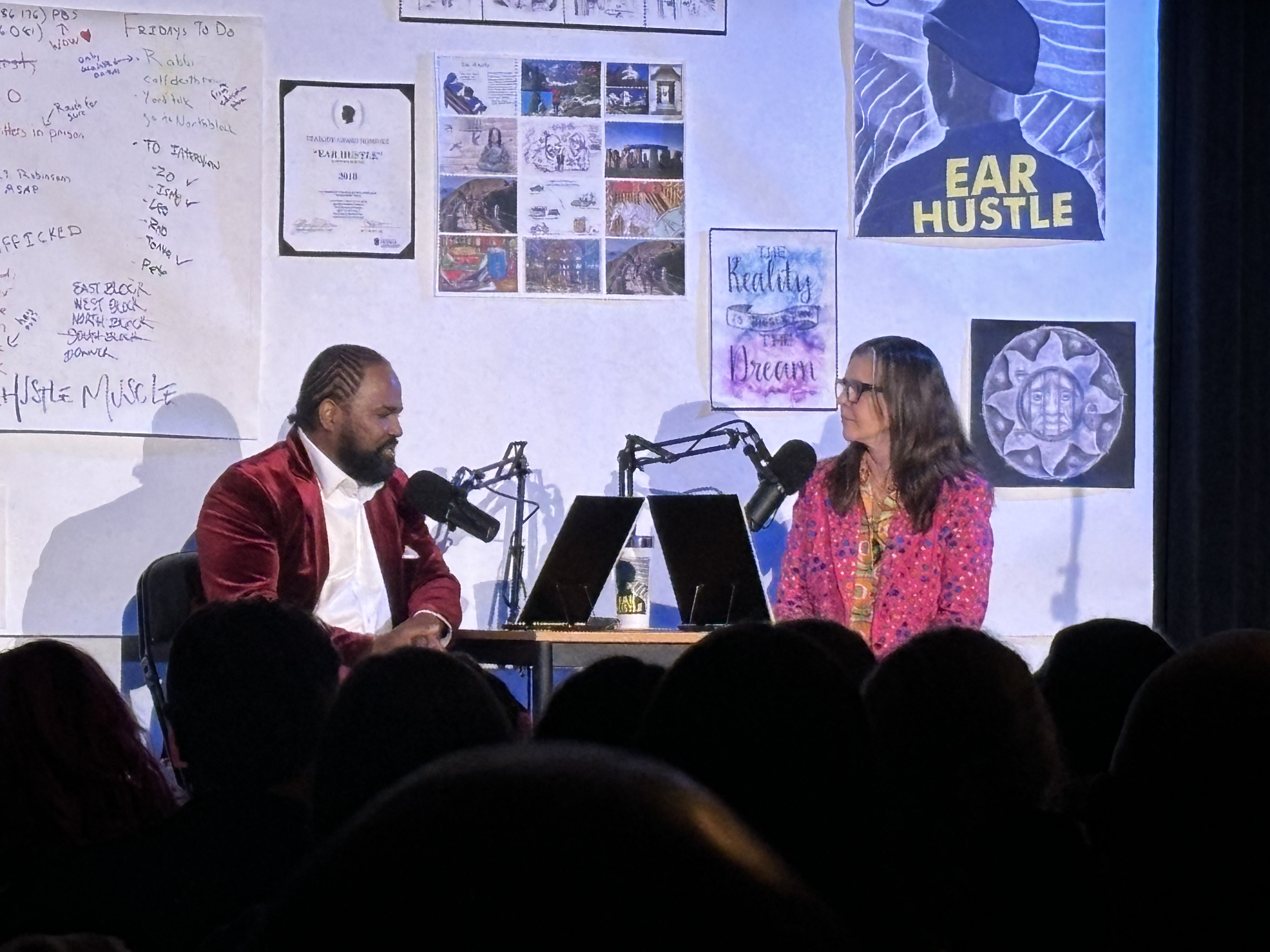
Earlonne Woods and Nigel Poor at Ear Hustle Live at Polaris Hall in Portland, Oregon

In March 2016, the Public Radio Exchange's Radiotopia network put out a call for new podcast ideas via an initiative called Podquest, with funding from the John S. and James L. Knight Foundation. It received 1,537 entries from 53 countries. After two rounds of judging, Ear Hustle was selected as the winner and added to the Radiotopia network. Its first season began on June 14, 2017. Ear Hustle was the first podcast to be created entirely inside a prison.

The show is produced by Earlonne Woods, Rahsaan "New York" Thomas, and Nigel Poor. Co-creators Woods and Antwan Williams were inmates at San Quentin State Prison for the first three seasons of the show. Woods was serving a 31-years-to-life sentence for attempted 2nd degree robbery due to a three-strikes law before having his sentence commuted in 2018. Williams was serving a 15-year sentence for armed robbery with a gun enhancement. Poor is a visual artist in the San Francisco Bay area who volunteers at the prison. Woods and Poor cohost the show while Williams does the show's sound design, working in San Quentin's media lab to record music and effects, including foley work.

Prior to Ear Hustle, Poor ran a photography class at the prison during which one of her students proposed making a documentary. Due to the complex and time-consuming bureaucratic challenges associated with unusual prison activities, she decided that audio would be easier to manage than video. The show was still challenging to create, in part because none of the three producers had a background in audio production, but also because of prison administration red tape. The prison also went on lockdown during production, halting work and requiring additional administrative steps to both create and release the audio.

On November 21, 2018, producer Earlonne Woods's sentence was commuted by California governor Jerry Brown. His commutation includes reference to Earlonne's work on the podcast. As of Season 4, Woods continues to make the podcast from outside prison, while Rahsaan "New York" Thomas was announced as a new co-host for recordings done inside San Quentin.

By September 2021, Ear Hustle episodes had been downloaded over 54 million times. On October 19, 2021, co-hosts Poor and Woods released a book on the podcast, This Is Ear Hustle.

== Synopsis ==
The term "ear hustle" is prison slang for eavesdropping. The show features interviews with inmates who share their stories and opinions on topics like cellmates, solitary confinement, race, morality, pets, religion, gangs, and family. Woods said that the show chose the topic of cellmates for its first episode to ensure the show was relatable, since most people can relate to having a bad roommate. In an interview with Rolling Stone, Poor said the show is "about everyday life inside a prison. How do you survive? How do you deal with family, love, depression, having children, finding meaning in life? It addresses important issues about being human and how prisoners can be contributing citizens." The series is not overtly political, but Poor emphasizes the way the show can have a humanizing effect, making listeners care about the men they hear on the show and wonder why one of the hosts might serve a life sentence for attempted robbery.

== Reception ==
In a Rolling Stone article about the show, Tana Ganeva called it "a fascinating, harrowing and also deeply entertaining look into life on the inside that runs the full gamut of emotions." She also praised its originality, "[using] prisoners' storytelling skills to show what it's like to spend decades behind bars." The show's unique lens and intimate first-person storytelling is noted in most reviews. In an op-ed for the Los Angeles Times, Lexi Mainland wrote "The runaway hit “Ear Hustle” ... never takes a broad look at criminal justice policy or employs Voice of God narration. It instead offers the even more illuminating dialogue of individual prisoners."

The New Yorker's Sarah Larson said the show "might be the best new podcast I’ve heard this year" and described it as being "about the creativity required to live a satisfying life—or even a sane life—in prison, and is itself a product of that creativity." In particular, she praised Williams' "evocative, pitch-perfect sound design". Galen Beebe's review for The Atlantic called it a "brilliant series" which "return[s] some of the humanity that the carceral system removes and provide[s] a link between inmates and outsiders."

Multiple reviewers noted how funny the show can be, despite often dealing with serious topics, and how uncommon it is to find humor in media taking place in real life prison settings. Vulture's Nicholas Quah noted a particular story a prisoner told about a frog in episode three: "a moment of levity in a setting often described in the worst of terms, a productive kind of conversation between the specificities of a person and the overpowering context of his incarceration. That, in a nutshell, is the juxtaposition that defines Ear Hustle." Quah contrasts standard prison narratives told entirely from an outsider's point of view with the interplay of insider and outsider perspectives provided by the hosts of Ear Hustle, with stories primarily told through Woods' and Williams' words and perspectives, and Poor in an active role adding "key narrative housekeeping".

=== Awards ===
Award	Date	Category	Result	Ref.
Webby Awards	2018	Documentary	Won	
Webby Awards	2019	Documentary	Won	
Webby Awards	2019	People's Voice Winner	Won	
Ambies	2021	Best Society and Culture Podcast	Nominated	
Ambies	2022	Best Society and Culture Podcast	Nominated	
Discover Pods Awards	2019	Best Society and Culture Podcast	Runner-up	
Discover Pods Awards	2020	Best Society and Culture Podcast	Nominated	
Discover Pods Awards	2019	Most Innovative Podcast	Won	
iHeartRadio Podcast Awards	2019	Best Social Impact Podcast	Won	
Pulitzer Prize	2020	Audio Reporting	Finalist	
Alfred I. duPont–Columbia University Award	2021	Best of Journalism	Won	
Peabody Awards	2017	Podcasts & Radio	Nominated	
Peabody Awards	2018	Podcasts & Radio	Nominated	
Third Coast International Audio Festival	2018	Best Documentary	Honoree	

== See also ==
- List of American crime podcasts
