= Earlonne Woods =

American podcaster and author

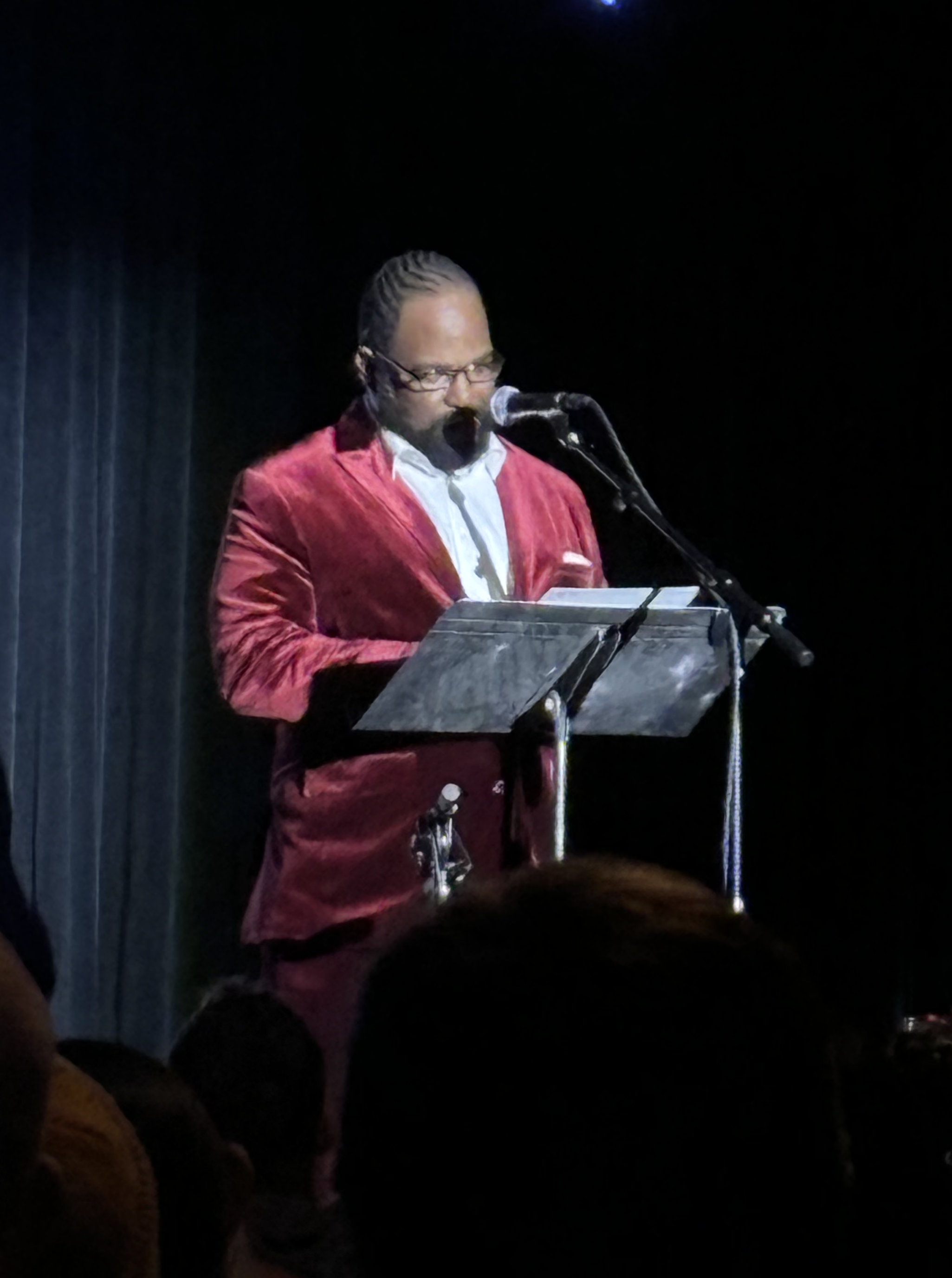
- Born: August 13, 1971 (age 54)
- Occupation: Podcaster
- Years active: 2018–present
- Notable work: Ear Hustle, This Is Ear Hustle

Earlonne Woods (born August 13, 1971) is an American podcaster and author, best known for co-hosting and co-founding the podcast Ear Hustle in 2017, and co-authoring the book This Is Ear Hustle in 2021. Woods helped create Ear Hustle while incarcerated at San Quentin State Prison. In November 2018, Woods' sentence was commuted by California governor Jerry Brown. In November 2024, Woods was pardoned by California governor Gavin Newsom. He was hired to continue co-hosting and producing the podcast after his release. In 2020, alongside his Ear Hustle co-hosts, he was a finalist for the Pulitzer Prize for Audio Reporting.

== Early life ==
Woods was raised in South Los Angeles with his parents and his older brother Trevor. His mother was a postal worker and his father was an unemployed alcoholic, who Woods described as violent and distant. When he was nine, Woods lifted up a faulty railroad crossing gate to allow cars to pass. Woods said he was only trying to be helpful, but was arrested by local sheriffs who did not question why he had lifted the gate; Woods subsequently had to appear in juvenile court. He became affiliated with a local Crips gang in high school, and began selling marijuana at 14, and later sold cocaine. Woods never used the drug, though became addicted to the money and lifestyle selling it provided. When he was 15, he committed his first robbery alongside his brother, who had transitioned from selling drugs to robbing drug dealers.

Woods first went to prison at 17 for two concurrent convictions of kidnapping and robbing a drug dealer, and was released at 23. In 1997, at the age of 25, he was arrested for attempted second degree robbery. Woods was unaware his two convictions as a juvenile counted as two 'strikes', which made his conviction at 25 count as his third under California's three strikes law. He received a sentence of 31-years-to-life.

== Ear Hustle ==
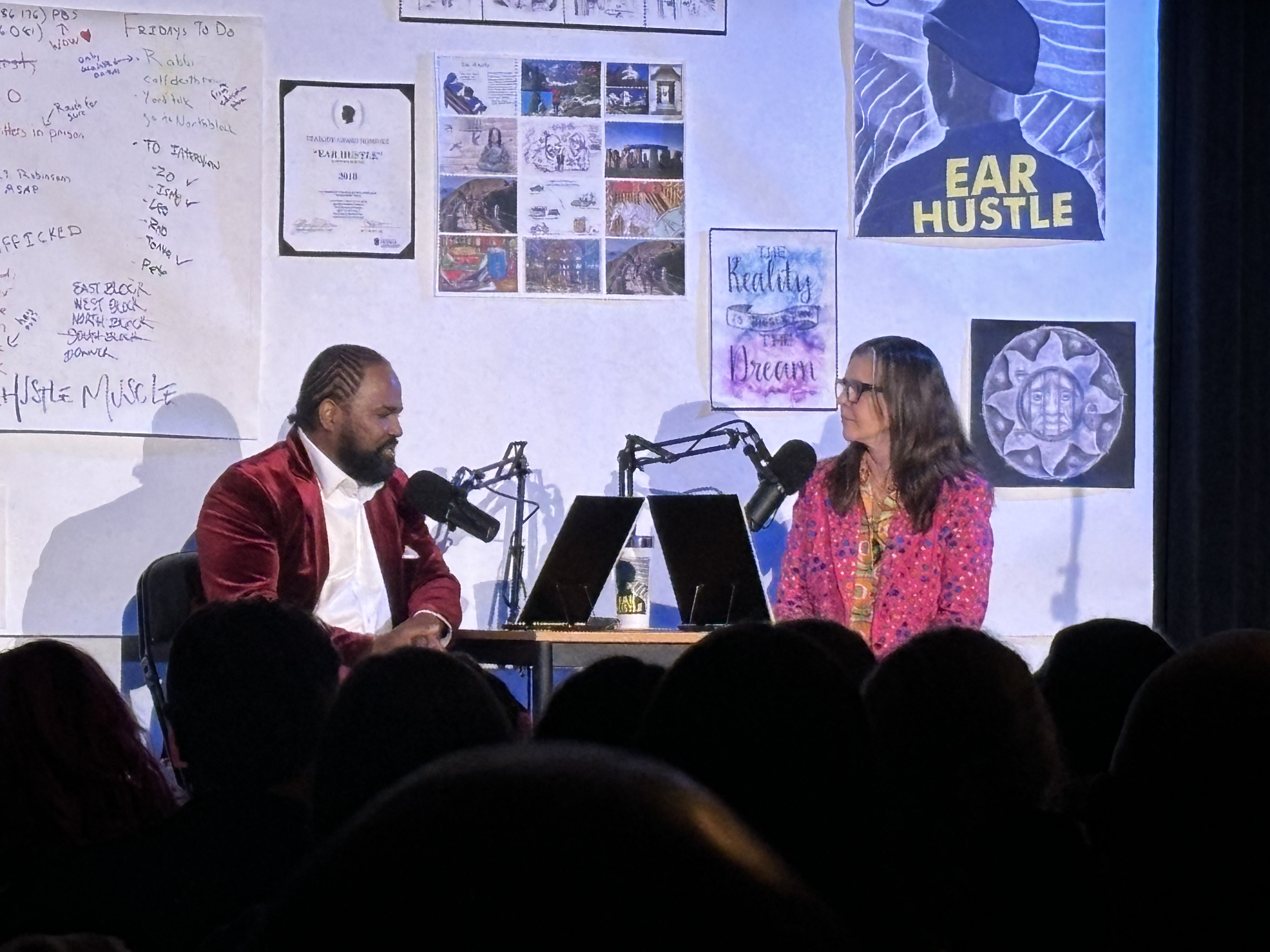
Woods and co-host Nigel Poor at Ear Hustle Live at Polaris Hall in Portland, Oregon

Woods completed his General Educational Development in prison, as well as vocational courses such as auto mechanics. While incarcerated at California State Prison, Centinela, Woods saw a documentary about the film school at San Quentin State Prison, and applied to transfer to that prison. He served his last seven years at San Quentin.

Woods met artist and volunteer Nigel Poor, who was teaching photography at the film school. The two established a rapport, and Poor proposed the idea of creating a podcast to Woods, who had previously not known what a podcast was. They recruited fellow inmate Antwan Williams as the show's sound designer, and submitted their idea for a podcast to a contest hosted by Radiotopia. Ear Hustle was selected from 1,537 submissions, securing the funding for a 10-episode first season. Ear Hustle was the first podcast entirely recorded and produced inside a prison. While in San Quentin, Woods was unpaid for his work on Ear Hustle, though fans would often send him money. Woods' role on the podcast was well-received, with Sarah Larson from The New Yorker describing him as an "immediately warm and likable presence", while Eddie Harana from Rolling Stone praised the sense of humor he brought to the show.

In November 2018, then California Governor Jerry Brown commuted Woods' sentence, saying he had "clearly shown that he is no longer the man he was when he committed this crime" and that "he has set a positive example for his peers and, through his podcast, has shared meaningful stories from those inside prison." Woods later traveled to thank Brown and interview him for the podcast. According to The Economist, by this time Woods was one of the most famous incarcerated people in the US. Woods relocated to Oakland, California after his release, and was hired full-time as a producer and co-host of Ear Hustle. Since his commutation, Woods has become involved in campaigns to repeal California's three strikes laws. In 2020, alongside Poor and co-host Rahsaan Thomas, Woods was a finalist for the Pulitzer Prize for Audio Reporting. In 2021, Woods and Poor co-authored the book This Is Ear Hustle.
