= San Quentin Rehabilitation Center =

Men's prison in California, US

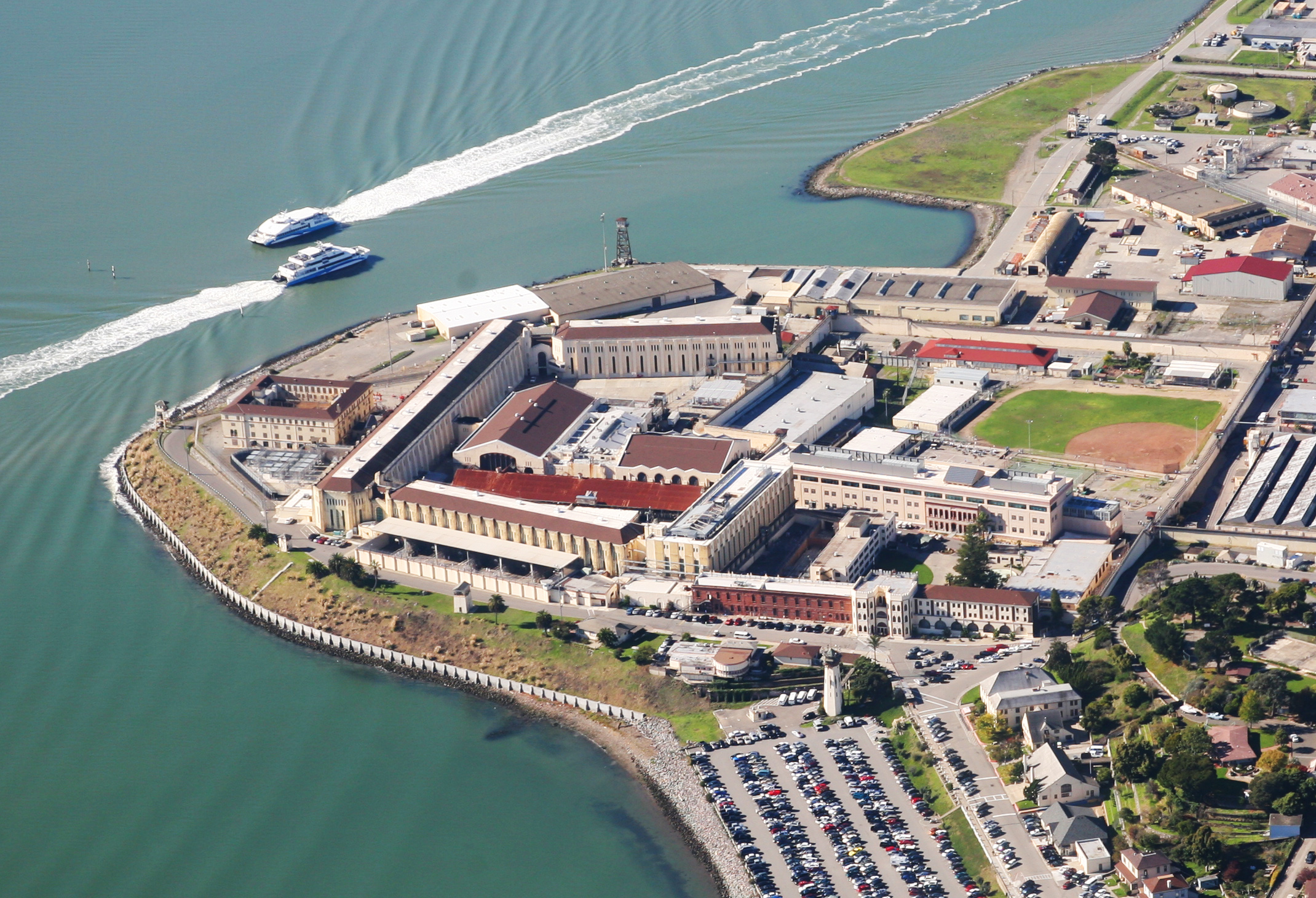

- Location within San Francisco Bay Area Location within California Location within the United States
- Location: San Quentin, California, U.S.; 37.939°N 122.489°W
- Status: Operational
- Security class: Minimum–maximum
- Capacity: 3,084
- Population: 3,542 (114.9%) (January 31, 2023)
- Opened: July 1852; 174 years ago
- Managed by: California Department of Corrections and Rehabilitation
- Warden: Chance Andes

San Quentin Rehabilitation Center (SQ), formerly known as San Quentin State Prison, is a California Department of Corrections and Rehabilitation state prison for men, located north of San Francisco in the unincorporated place of San Quentin in Marin County.

Established in 1852, and opening in 1854, San Quentin is the oldest prison in California. The state's only death row for male inmates, the largest in the United States, was located at the prison. Its gas chamber has not been used since 1993, and its lethal injection chamber was last used in 2006. The prison has been featured on film, radio drama, video, podcast, and television; is the subject of many books; has hosted concerts; and has housed many notorious inmates.

== Facilities ==
San Quentin State Prison
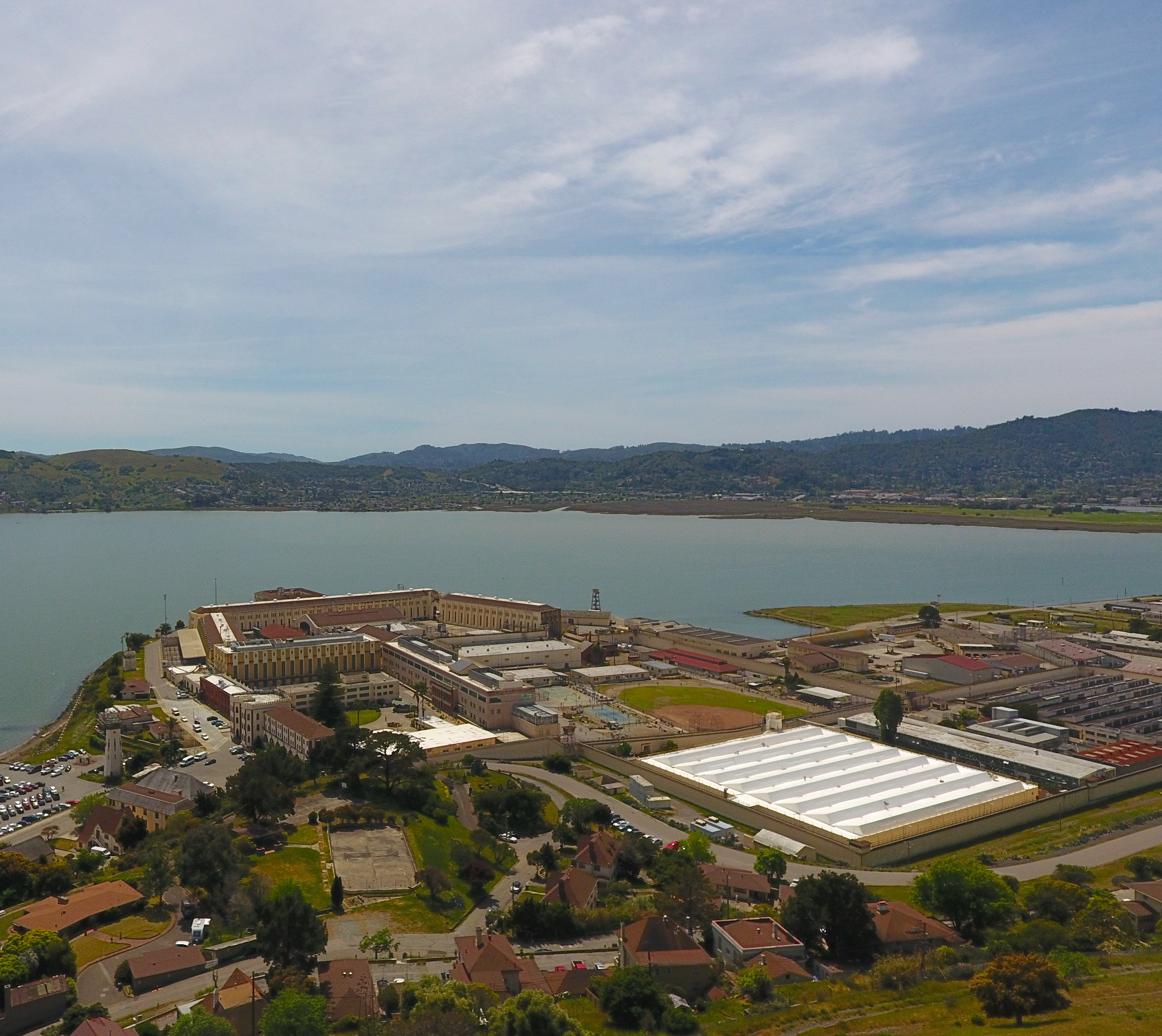
Aerial view of San Quentin, including the housing units, yard, education center, and Prison Industry Authority facilities

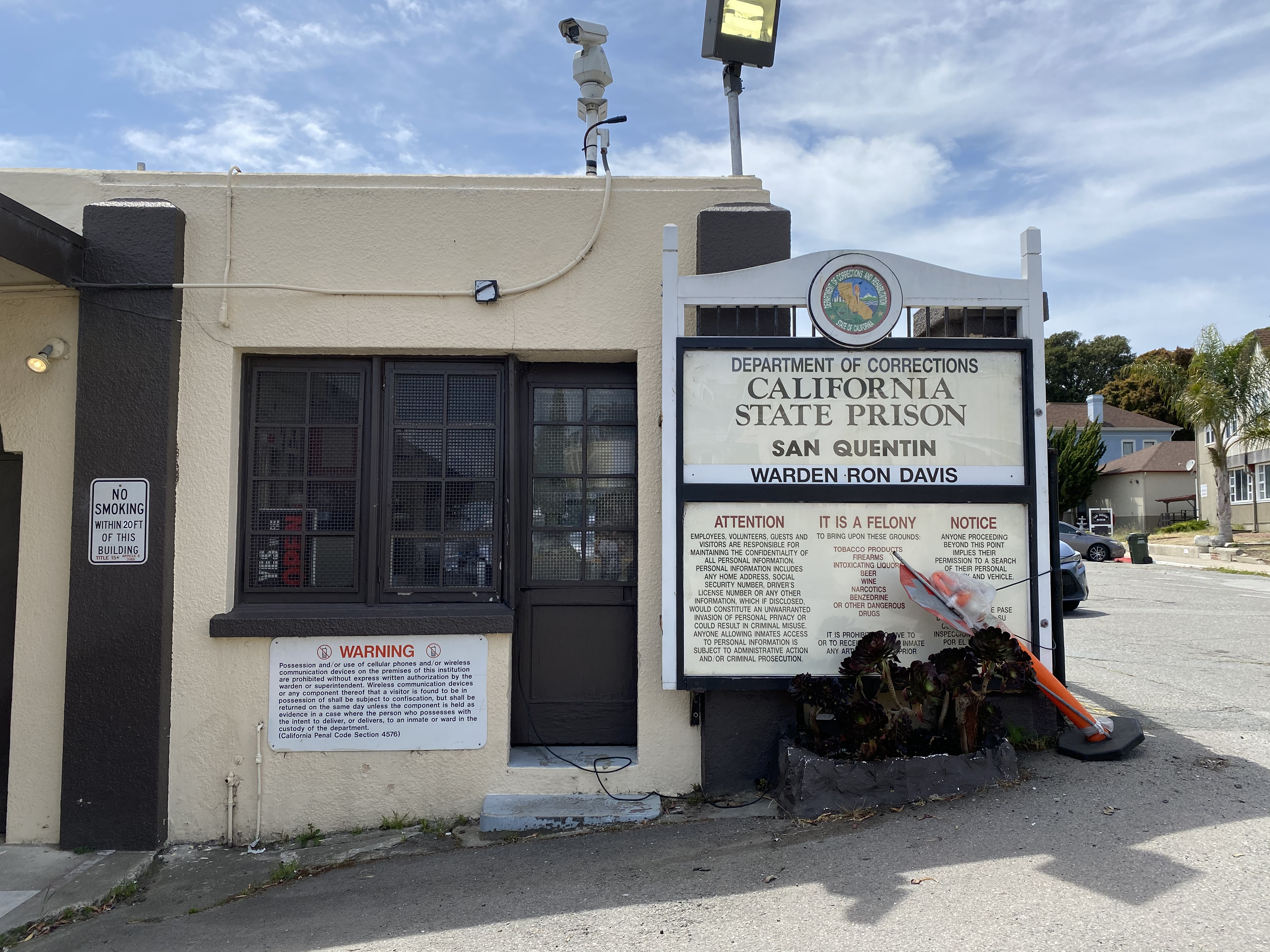
San Quentin's East Gate, the primary entrance for visitors and volunteers

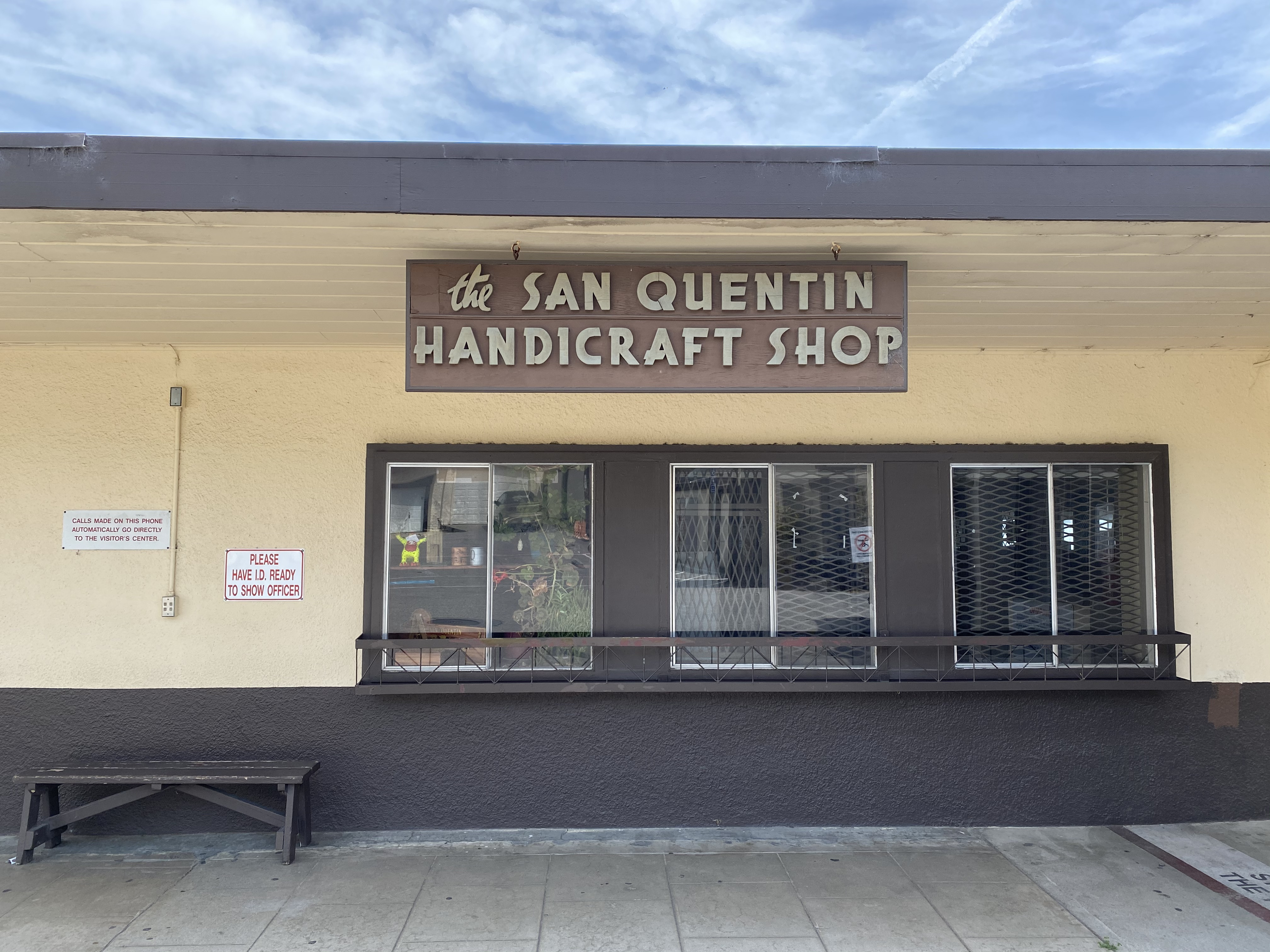
The San Quentin Handicraft Shop, where art created by prisoners is sold. Money from sales goes to the Inmate Welfare Fund and restitution

The correctional complex sits on Point San Quentin, which consists of 432 acres (1.75 square kilometers) on the north side of San Francisco Bay. The prison complex itself occupies 275 acres (1.11 km^{2}), valued in a 2001 study at between $129 million and $664 million.

As of July 31, 2022, San Quentin was incarcerating people at 105% of its design capacity, with 3,239 occupants.

=== Death row ===
Men condemned to death in California were, in general, formerly held at San Quentin. Most of the former death row population, with some exceptions, have been moved to general population in other California institutions as of May 28, 2024. These transfers have been arranged to comply with Proposition 66 and are being managed by the Condemned Inmate Transfer Program of the California Department of Corrections and Rehabilitation. Of the 598 condemned inmates in California as of February 5, 2025, only 9 remained at San Quentin, with the last 9 inmates expected to also be transferred after completing needed medical or psychiatric care. Despite the transfers, the condemned inmates remain under sentence of death at their new institutions.

Condemned women are held at Central California Women's Facility in Chowchilla. As of December 2015, San Quentin held almost 700 male inmates in its Condemned Unit, or "death row". As of 2001, San Quentin's death row was described as "the largest in the Western Hemisphere"; as of 2005, it was called "the most populous execution antechamber in the United States." The states of Florida and Texas had fewer death row inmates in 2008 (397 and 451 respectively) than San Quentin.

The death row at San Quentin was divided into three sections: the quiet "North-Segregation" or "North-Seg", built in 1934, for prisoners who "don't cause trouble"; the "East Block", a "crumbling, leaky maze of a place built in 1927"; and the "Adjustment Center" for the "worst of the worst". Most of the prison's death row inmates resided in the East Block. The fourth floor of the North Block was the prison's first death row facility, but additional death row space opened after executions resumed in the U.S. in 1978. The adjustment center received solid doors, preventing "gunning-down" or attacking persons with bodily waste. As of 2016 it housed 81 death row inmates and four non-death row inmates. A dedicated psychiatric facility serves the prisoners. A converted shower bay in the East Block hosted religious services. Many prison programs available for most inmates were unavailable for death row inmates.

Although $395 million was allocated in the 2008–2009 state budget for new death row facilities at San Quentin, in December 2008 two legislators introduced bills to eliminate the funding. The state had planned to build a new death row facility, but Governor Jerry Brown canceled those plans in 2011. In 2015 Brown asked the Legislature for funds for a new death row as the current death row facilities were becoming filled. At the time the non-death row prison population was decreasing, opening room for death row inmates. As of 2015 the San Quentin death row had a capacity of 715 prisoners.

=== Executions ===
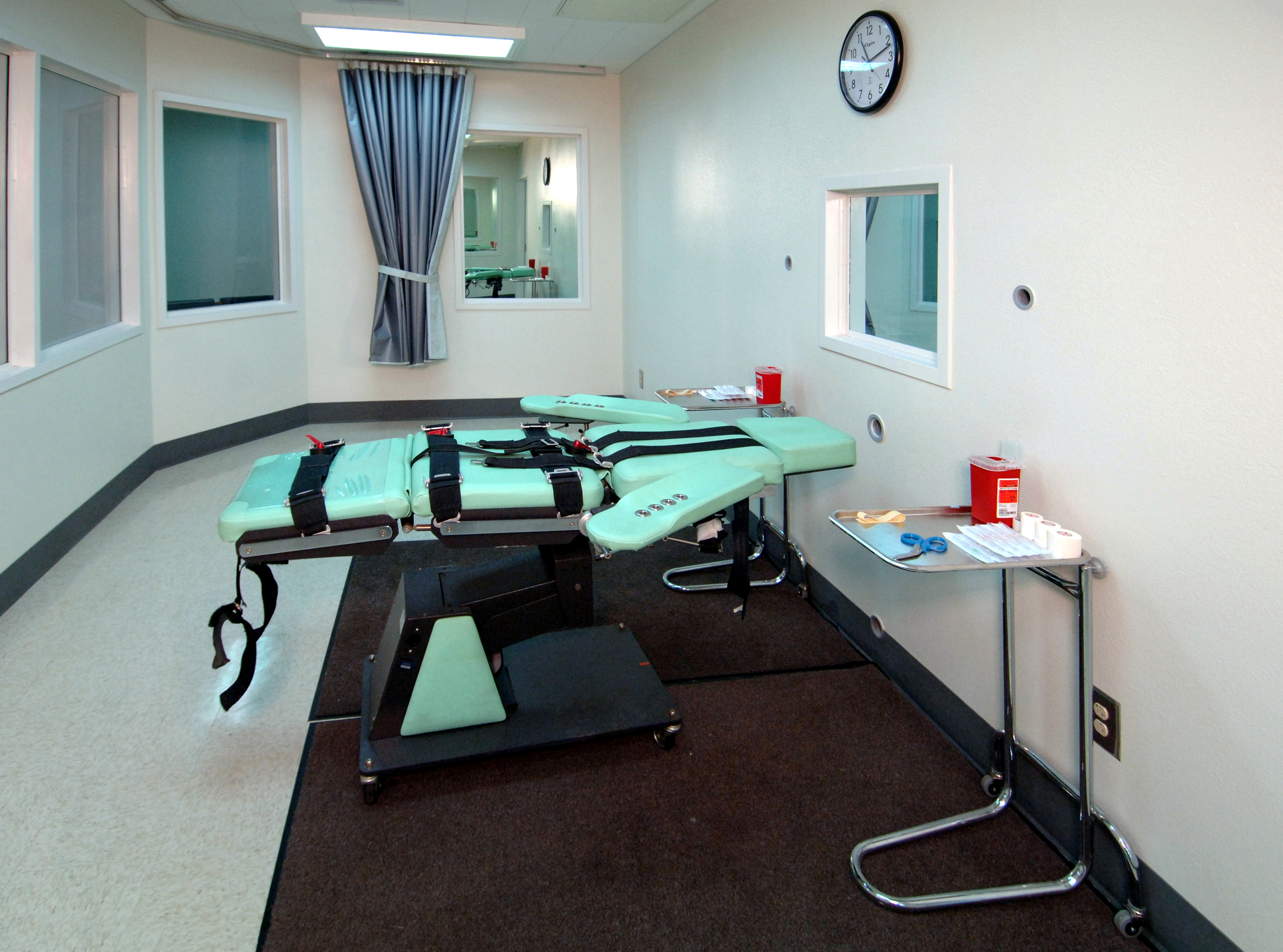
Lethal injection room in San Quentin, closed in 2019. It was never used.

All executions in California (male and female) take place at San Quentin. The execution chamber is located in a one-story addition close to the East Block. Women executed in California are transported to San Quentin by bus before being executed.

The methods for execution at San Quentin have changed over time. Prior to 1893, the counties executed convicts. Between 1893 and 1937, 215 people were executed at San Quentin by hanging, after which 196 prisoners died in the gas chamber. The gas chamber was constructed by inmates in 1937. In 1995, the use of gas for execution was ruled "cruel and unusual punishment", which led to executions inside the gas chamber by lethal injection. Between 1996 and 2006, eleven people were executed at San Quentin by lethal injection.

In April 2007, staff of the California Legislative Analyst's Office discovered that a new execution chamber was being built at San Quentin; legislators subsequently "accuse[d] the governor of hiding the project from the Legislature and the public." The old lethal injection facility had included an injection room of 43 square feet (4.0 square meters) and a single viewing area; the facility that was being built included an injection chamber of 230 square feet (21 m^{2}) and three viewing areas for family, victim, and press. Governor Arnold Schwarzenegger stopped construction of the facility the next week. The legislature later approved $180,000 to finish the project, and the facility was completed.

In addition to state executions, three federal executions have been carried out at San Quentin. Samuel Richard Shockley and Miran Edgar Thompson had been incarcerated at Alcatraz Island federal penitentiary and were executed on December 3, 1948, for the murder of two prison guards during the Battle of Alcatraz. Carlos Romero Ochoa had murdered a federal immigration officer after he was caught smuggling illegal immigrants across the border near El Centro, California. He was executed at San Quentin's gas chamber on December 10, 1948.

On March 13, 2019, after Governor Gavin Newsom ordered a moratorium on the state's death penalty, the state withdrew its current lethal injection protocol, and San Quentin dismantled and indefinitely closed its gas and lethal injection execution chambers.

== Programs ==
- Prison to Employment Connection, A Better Way Out - Prison to Employment Connection is offered to inmates at San Quentin State Prison who are close to their release dates or have a scheduled Parole Board Hearing. After successfully completing a rigorous 14-week employment readiness program, inmates are invited to an Employer Day. Potential employers (PEC Partners) come to the prison to interview inmates, review their resumes, and offer guidance and support for potential employment upon release.
- VVGSQ – Vietnam Veterans Group San Quentin – Although the group had been meeting for some time, the name officially began on April 7, 1987. In 1988 they started the annual Christmas Toy giveaway, giving toys to visiting children. In 1989 they began the annual scholarship fund for high school seniors. They spend their time raising money and since 1987 have given over $80,000 to the community.
- The Last Mile started in 2011 under Chris Redlitz (entrepreneur and venture capital) initiative. The program aims to give resources and mentorship to inmates to help them find their way into tech startup entrepreneurship and reduce the rate of recidivism.
- The San Quentin Drama Workshop began at the prison in 1958 after a performance of Waiting for Godot the previous year.
- The San Quentin SQUIRES ("San Quentin Utilization of Inmate Resources, Experiences, and Studies") program, which began in 1964, is reported to be the "oldest juvenile awareness program in the United States." It involves inmates at the prison interacting with troubled youths for the purpose of deterring them from crime, and was the subject of a 1978 documentary film Squires of San Quentin. In 1983, a randomized controlled study was published that found that the program produced no overall reduction in delinquency. The program was still functional as of 2008.
- Since the 1920s, San Quentin inmates have been allowed to play baseball. Starting in 1994 inmates have played against players from outside the prison. The games occur twice a week through the summer. Originally the Pirates, the team of prisoners is called the "Giants" in honor of the San Francisco Giants, who donated uniforms to the team. A second team called the Athletics was later started, named after the Oakland Athletics. The team of outside players is called the "Willing". The umpires and fans are inmates, but the coaches on the field are volunteers. Although some people question the appropriateness of baseball games being held at the prison, officials believe "organized sports is a way to keep inmates occupied and perhaps teach a few lessons on getting along with others." These games were detailed in a Real Sports with Bryant Gumbel episode on June 20, 2006, and in several other documentaries.
- San Quentin has the only on-site college degree-granting program in California's entire prison system, which began in 1996 and which is currently run by the Mount Tamalpais College.
- No More Tears Program, co-founded by incarcerated men at San Quentin. This program is committed to stopping the violence in the community and changing the mindset. This program stays alive through donations, volunteers, and CDCR who come into the prison and become involved in the workshops with the incarcerated men: Changing the mindset, Response to Violence, Employability, Fixin' da Hood. All inmates and volunteers are working toward achieving the program's mission: stopping the tears of loved ones and family by being committed to stopping the youth from committing acts of violence.
- The California Reentry Program at San Quentin, begun in 2003, "helps inmates re-enter society after they serve their sentences."
- The San Quentin News is the only male inmate-produced newspaper in California and one of the few in the world.

== History ==
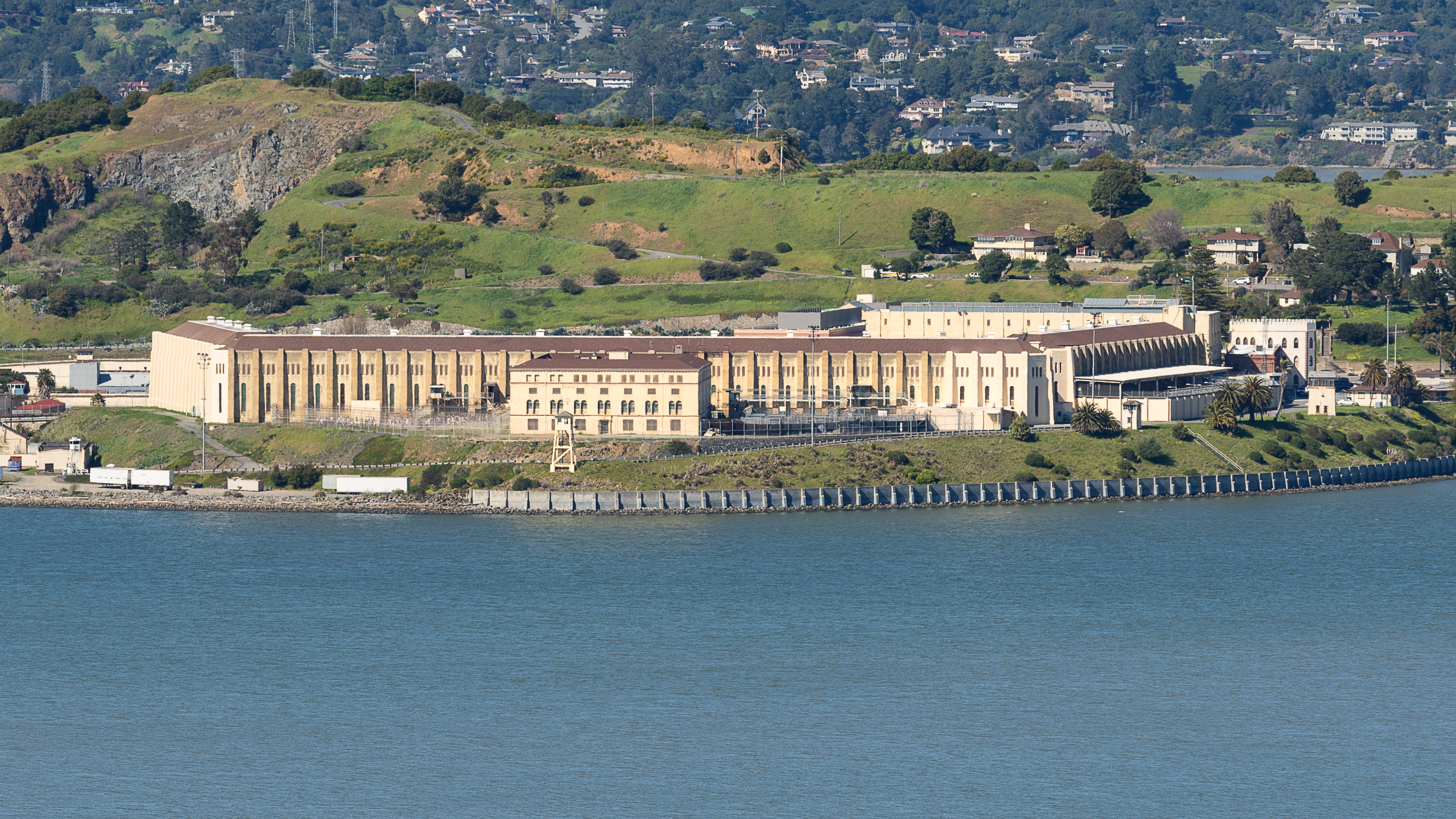
The sprawling San Quentin prison complex

Though numerous towns and localities in the area are named after Roman Catholic saints, and "San Quintín" is Spanish for "Saint Quentin", the prison was not named after the saint. The land on which it is situated, Point Quentin, is named after a Coast Miwok warrior named Quentín, fighting under Chief Marin, who was taken prisoner at that place.

In 1851, California's first prison opened; it was a 268-ton wooden ship named the Waban, anchored in San Francisco Bay and outfitted to hold 30 inmates. Some of the Waban's timber remains a part of the new hospital structure inside the prison. After a series of speculative land transactions and a legislative scandal, inmates who were housed on the Waban constructed San Quentin which opened its first cell block, nicknamed "the Stones", in 1854. Before being retired altogether, this initial unit would come to be used as a dungeon after newer additions were constructed atop it. The Stones, however, survive to this day and is thought to be California's oldest surviving public work.

According to the San Quentin Prison Museum, from the first day in 1852 until 1927, women were housed the same as men.

From 1913 to 1951, Leo Stanley performed numerous medical experiments on San Quentin's inmates.

Clinton Duffy was the warden from 1940 to 1952. He had fresh insights informing the reorganization of the prison structure and reformation of prison management. Prior to Duffy, San Quentin had gone through years of violence, inhumane punishments and civil rights abuses against prisoners. The previous warden was forced to resign. Duffy had the offending prison guards fired and added a librarian, psychiatrists, and several surgeons at San Quentin. Duffy's press agent publicized sweeping reforms. San Quentin remained a brutal prison where prisoners continued to be beaten to death. The use of torture as an approved method of interrogation at San Quentin was banned in 1944.

In 1941, the first prison meeting of Alcoholics Anonymous took place at San Quentin; in commemoration of this, the 25-millionth copy of the AA Big Book was presented to Jill Brown, of San Quentin, at the International Convention of Alcoholics Anonymous in Toronto, Ontario, Canada.

In 1947, Warden Duffy recruited Herman Spector to work as assistant warden at San Quentin. Spector turned down the invitation to be assistant warden and chose instead to become senior librarian if he could institute his theories on reading as a program to encourage pro-social behavior. By 1955, Spector was being interviewed in library journals and suggesting the prison library could contribute significantly to rehabilitation.

The dining hall of the prison is adorned by six 20 ft (6.1 m) sepia-toned murals depicting California history. They were painted by Alfredo Santos, one-time convicted heroin dealer and successful artist, during his 1953–1955 incarceration. The murals were painted with a thinned, raw sienna oil paint directly to plaster as he was denied use of other colors to paint with.

Between 1992 and 1997, a "boot camp" was held at the prison that was intended to "rehabilitat[e] first-time, nonviolent offenders"; the program was discontinued because it did not reduce recidivism or save money.

A corrections officer was fatally stabbed on June 8, 1985 when inmates stabbed him through the bars of their locked cell. The weapon they used was a spear that the inmates had made in their cell. In response officials tightened their contraband screening and later the same year discovered stashed bullets and gunpowder. Coroners have reported finding shivs inside inmates bodies, hidden in the rectum to avoid detection.

A 2005 court-ordered report found that the prison was "old, antiquated, dirty, poorly staffed, poorly maintained with inadequate medical space and equipment and overcrowded." Later that year, the warden was fired for "threaten[ing] disciplinary action against a doctor who spoke with attorneys about problems with health care delivery at the prison." By 2007, a new trauma center had opened at the prison and a new $175 million medical complex was planned.

In 2020, the prison became the center of a COVID-19 outbreak, after a group of prisoners were transferred to San Quentin from the California Institution for Men in Chino, California. Initial reports suggested that San Quentin officials were told that the new inmates had all tested negative; however, few had been tested at all. By June 22, at least 350 inmates and staff had tested positive, in what a federal judge called a "significant failure" of policy.

In March 2023, California governor Gavin Newsom announced a "historic transformation" of the then-called San Quentin State Prison as part of a project to improve public safety through a greater focus on rehabilitation and education. As part of the project, the prison was renamed San Quentin Rehabilitation Center and an advisory group of rehabilitation and public safety experts was formed to advise the efforts.

== Notable inmates ==
=== Current ===
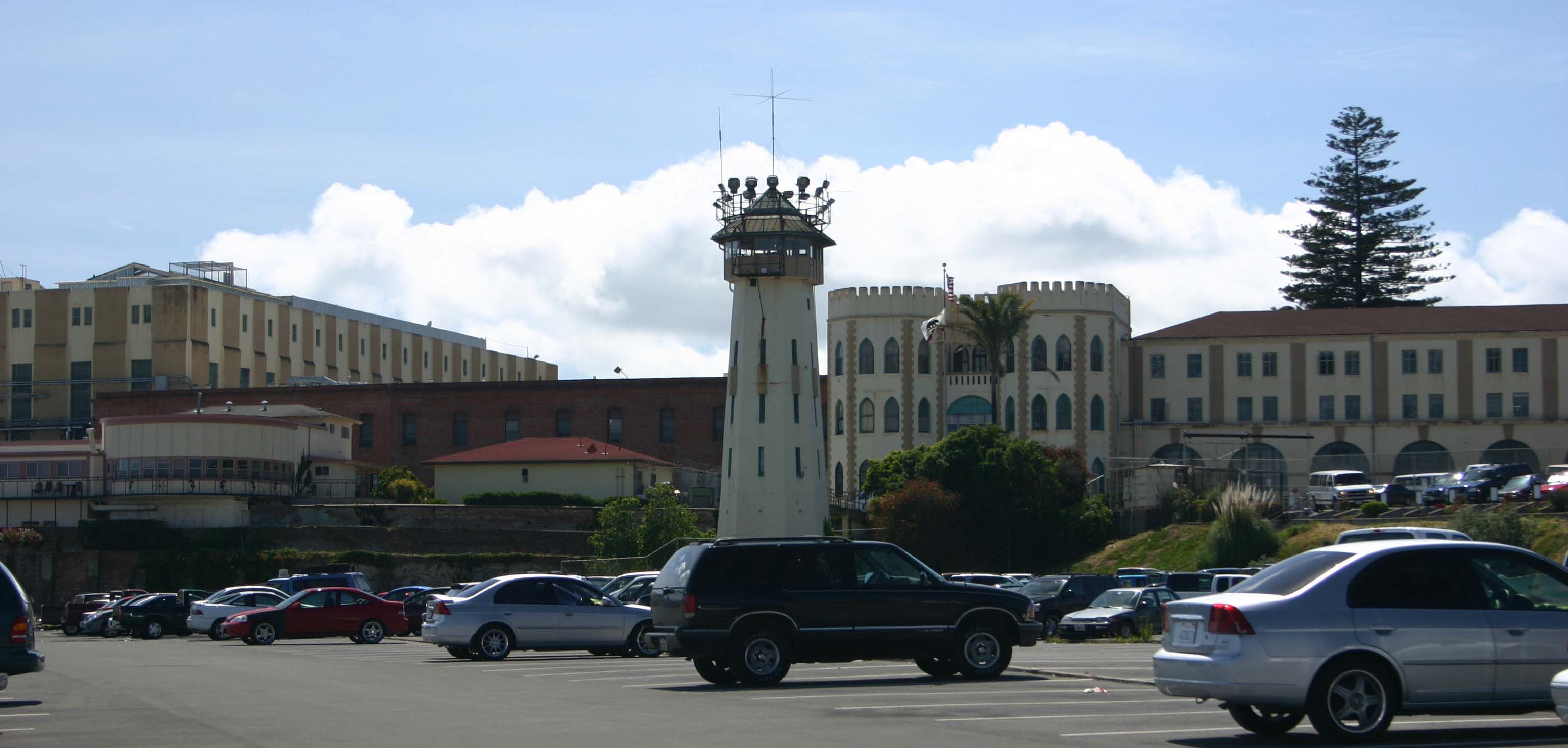
San Quentin up close

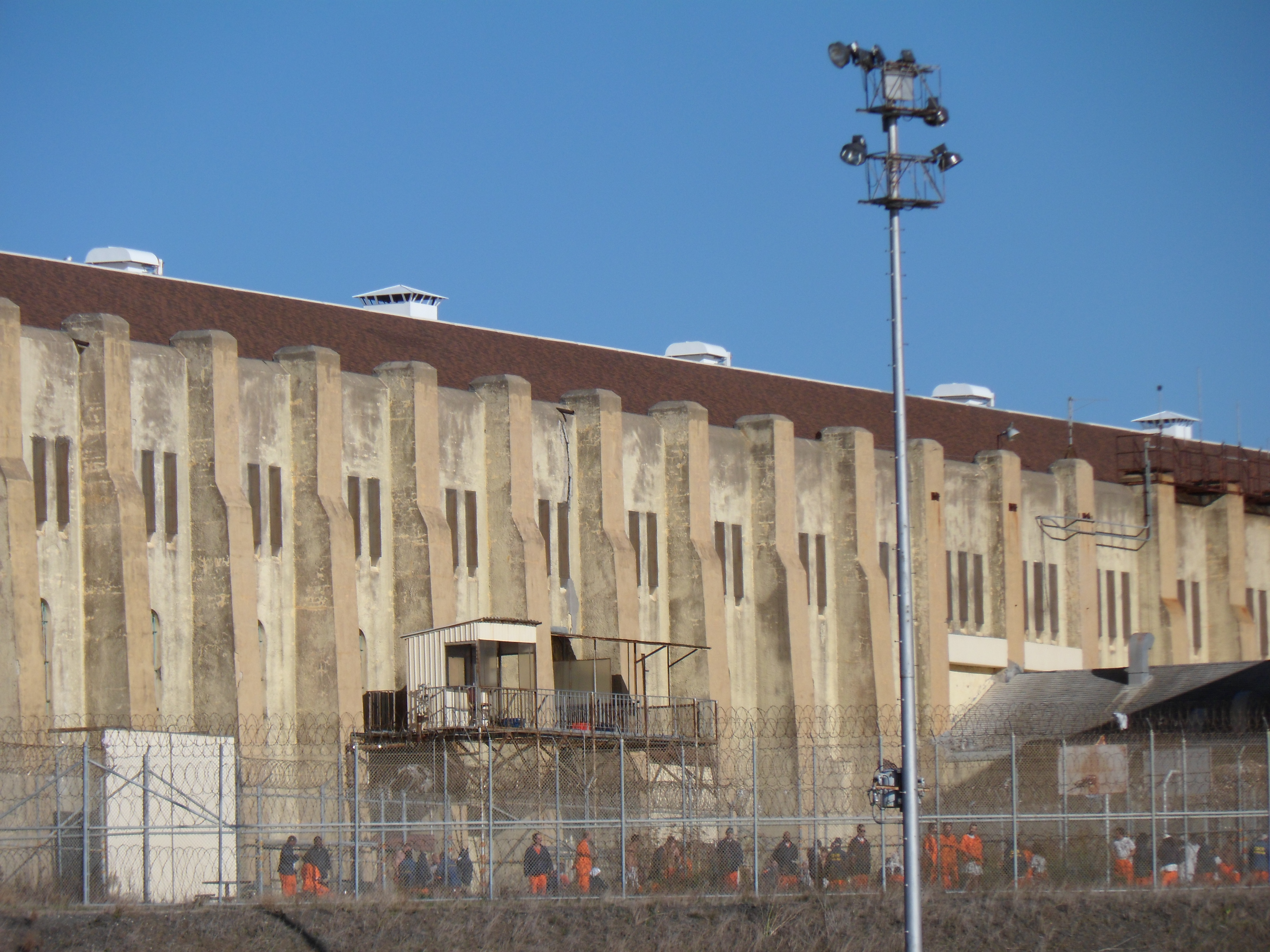
San Quentin prisoners on recreation

- Joseph Danks (born 1962): "Koreatown Slasher" who murdered six homeless men in Los Angeles in 1987. Sentenced to death in 1993 for strangling his cellmate in California Correctional Institution in Tehachapi.
- Skylar Deleon (born 1979): former child actor and triple murderer responsible for the deaths of Thomas and Jackie Hawks. Sentenced to death in 2009. One of Deleon's accomplices, John Fitzgerald Kennedy, was also sentenced to death in 2009.
- Jon Dunkle (born 1960): convicted of murdering three young boys in Belmont. Sentenced to death in 1990.
- Wayne Adam Ford (born 1961): convicted of killing four women in 1997 and 1998. Sentenced to death in 2006.
- Billy Ray Waldon (born 1952): murderer and rapist who killed three people. Sentenced to death in 1987.

=== Former ===
Richard Allen Davis (born 1954): convicted of kidnapping and murdering Polly Klaas.[1] Sentenced to death in 1996.[2] He is currently housed at Avenal State Prison.

Bruce Davis (born 1942): member of the Manson family convicted of the murder of Donald "Shorty" Shea and sentenced to life in 1974. Later transferred to California Medical Facility, Vacaville where he died.

Vincent Brothers (born 1962): convicted in the shooting and stabbing of five members of his family, including three children. Sentenced to death in 2007.[1]

- Jeffrey Aguilar: (born 1985) was convicted and sentenced to death for the murder of Oxnard business owner, Gurmohinder Singh. On a Saturday morning in August 2008, Singh, known for his check cashing and mini mart businesses, was robbed and fatally shot outside the US Bank on Oxnard Blvd. At the time of the incident, Singh was carrying $100,000 in cash. Aguilar, a known gang member, was linked to the crime through an ATM photo taken at the murder scene. Two days after the incident, he was involved in a shootout with Oxnard Police but escaped. He was captured later in Carpinteria, California. Aguilar's eligibility for the death penalty was based on committing the murder during a robbery while lying in wait and was sentenced to death in 2013. In 2023, Aguilar was transferred to Kern Valley State Prison as part of Governor Gavin Newsom’s reformation of San Quentin State Prison’s death row..
- Marie Equi
- Isauro Aguirre (born 1980): tortured and killed girlfriend's 8-year-old son Gabriel Fernandez along with his girlfriend Pearl Fernandez. Aguirre was sentenced to death and Fernandez to life in prison in 2018. The case was the subject of the Netflix series The Trials of Gabriel Fernandez.
- Rodney Alcala: serial killer sentenced to death. He was later transferred to Corcoran State Prison where he died.
- William Dale Archerd: murdered three family members by injecting them with insulin. Sentenced to death but commuted to life in prison. Died from pneumonia in California Medical Facility in 1977.
- Alejandro Avila (born 1971): the rapist and murderer of 5-year-old Samantha Runnion. Sentenced to death in 2005.
- Bobby Beausoleil: a former associate of the Charles Manson "Family" currently serving a life sentence in prison.
- Charles Bolles: alias Black Bart, an American Old West outlaw.
- Richard Delmer Boyer (born 1958): convicted for stabbing an elderly couple to death while high on alcohol and drugs. Claimed to have been partly influenced by a scene in Halloween II. Sentenced to death in 1984.
- Luis Bracamontes (born 1970): illegal immigrant who shot and killed two Sacramento police officers and injured a civilian and a third officer. Sentenced to death in 2018.
- William Bradford: murdered a barmaid and a 15-year-old girl and may have killed as many as 20 women. Died from natural causes in California Medical Facility in 2008.
- Albert Greenwood Brown (born 1954): convicted rapist and child molester who raped and murdered a teen girl in 1980. Sentenced to death in 1982.
- Brandon Browner (born 1984): former NFL player found guilty of attempted murder, currently serving eight-year sentence.
- Edward Bunker: FBI most wanted fugitive who reformed and became an author (he wrote a novel set in San Quentin) and actor. Was sentenced at age 17, the youngest inmate at the time.
- Rodolfo Cadena: influential member of the Mexican Mafia. Murdered by members of the Nuestra Familia in California Institution for Men in 1972.
- David Carpenter (born 1930): the "Trailside Killer". Sentenced to death in 1984 and 1988. Carpenter is the oldest inmate currently.
- Curtis Carroll (born 1968): Murderer turned financial adviser whose insights into investing and trading stock have earned the nickname "Wall Street".
- Dean Carter (born 1955): serial killer convicted of murdering four women. Sentenced to death in 1985.
- Steven David Catlin (born 1944): serial killer who poisoned two wives and his mother. Sentenced to death in 1990.
- Eldridge Cleaver: member of the Black Panther Party, was an inmate between 1958 and 1963.
- Kevin Cooper (born 1958): convicted for the hatchet and knife massacre of the Ryen family. Sentenced to death in 1985.
- Joseph Cosey: conman and criminal forger.
- Henry Cowell: composer, served four years (1936-1940) for homosexual acts with a minor.
- Tiequon Cox (born 1965): sentenced to death in 1986 for the 1984 murders of four relatives of the former defensive back NFL player Kermit Alexander. He was involved in an escape attempt in 2000.
- Louis Craine: serial killer who killed at least 4 women. Died from AIDS complications in hospital in 1989.
- Jonathan Daniel D'Arcy (born 1962): a janitor from Buena Park, was convicted of first-degree murder in the February 2, 1993 burning death of Karen Marie Laborde, a 42-year-old mother of two who identified D'Arcy as her assailant before she died. D'Arcy was sentenced to death in Orange County on April 11, 1997.
- Scott Dyleski: murdered attorney Daniel Horowitz's wife when he was 16 years old. Was held in San Quentin for several months before being transferred.
- Sonny Enraca (born 1972): gang member who shot and killed Boyz n the Hood actor Dedrick D. Gobert during an altercation. Sentenced to death in 1996.
- Pedro Espinoza (born 1989): 18th Street gang member who murdered Jamiel Shaw II. Sentenced to death in 2013.
- John Famalaro (born 1957): sentenced to death on September 6, 1997, for the kidnap, rape, and murder of 23-year-old Denise Anette Huber, from Newport Beach, California, in 1991. Famalaro abducted and murdered Denise on June 3, 1991. He was caught in July 1994 when police found her body in an icebox where he had kept her for three years.
- Richard Farley (born 1948): perpetrator of the Sunnyvale ESL shooting. Sentenced to death in 1992.
- Rickie Lee Fowler (born 1984): convicted of setting the Old Fire that caused the deaths of five people. Sentenced to death in 2012.
- John Linley Frazier: mass murderer and religious fanatic. Sentenced to death in 1971 but commuted to life in prison. Committed suicide by hanging in Mule Creek State Prison in 2009.
- Gerald Gallego: serial killer and rapist who kidnapped young girls to keep as sex slaves before killing them with his wife as an accomplice. Was initially sentenced to death in San Quentin but was transferred to Nevada State Prison in 1984 to be executed for murders committed in that state. Died from cancer in Nevada Prison in 2002.
- Alex García: boxer and former gang member who stabbed a rival to death.
- Michael Gargiulo (born 1976): serial killer who killed at least three women. Sentenced to death in 2021.
- Steven Dean Gordon: Serial killer and rapist sentenced to death in 2017 for four murders.
- Willie Earl Green: wrongfully convicted of murder and exonerated.
- Griffith J. Griffith: industrialist who shot his wife through the eye.
- Steve "Clem" Grogan: a former associate of the Charles Manson "Family". Released in 1985.
- Jose Guerrero (born 1973): serial killer who killed at least three women from 1995 to 1998. Sentenced to death in 2009.
- Merle Haggard: singer who spent time in San Quentin from 1958 to 1960.
- Billy Ray Hamilton: hitman who murdered three witnesses for Clarence Ray Allen in 1980. Died of natural causes in hospital in 2007.
- Charles Ray Hatcher: serial killer who murdered two young boys in the Bay Area. Released in 1977.
- Larry Hazlett (born 1948): convicted of the 1978 rape and murder of 20-year-old Rosamond beauty queen Tana Woolley. Sentenced to death in 2004.
- Glenn Helzer (born 1970): founder of the Children of Thunder cult, alongside his brother Justin Helzer and his girlfriend Dawn Godman, who murdered five people in 2000. Sentenced to death in 2005. Justin hanged himself in 2013.
- Ivan Hill (born 1961): serial killer who killed at least nine women from 1979 to 1994. Sentenced to death in 2007.
- Robert Hohenberger: suspected serial killer who served three years for kidnapping two girls in 1971.
- Eric Houston (born 1972): perpetrator of the Lindhurst school shooting spree that left three students and a teacher dead. Sentenced to death in 1993. The subject of the made-for-television movie Detention: The Siege at Johnson High.
- Ryan Hoyt (born 1979): associate of Jesse James Hollywood, convicted of the murder of Nicholas Markowitz. Sentenced to death in 2003.
- Michael Hughes (born 1956): serial killer who killed at least seven women from 1986 to 1993. Sentenced to death in 1998.
- Michael Wayne Hunter: former death row prisoner and writer who murdered his father and stepmother. Death sentence commuted to life in prison and currently incarcerated in Pleasant Valley State Prison.
- Jang In-hwan: Korean independence activist who assassinated former American diplomat Durham Stevens in 1908.
- Emrys John, Tyrone Miller, and Kesaun Sykes: former marines convicted of torturing and murdering Jan Pawel and Quiana Jenkins Pietrzak in 2008. All three were sentenced to death while a fourth accomplice, Kevin Cox, was sentenced to life in prison.
- Tomoya Kawakita: Japanese-American dual citizen convicted of treason for aiding Japan during World War II. Tomoya Kawakita appealed his conviction to the United States Supreme Court in Kawakita v. United States. Originally held in San Quentin for his upcoming execution before his death sentence was commuted to life in prison.
- Roger Kibbe: serial killer who admitted to seven murders in Northern California. Killed at Mule Creek State Prison in 2021.
- Randy Kraft (born 1945): serial killer who was convicted of 16 murders and suspected of 51 others. Sentenced to death in 1989.
- Chol Soo Lee: wrongly convicted of murdering a gang boss and sentenced to life in prison. Was sentenced to death for killing an inmate during a fight but was released in 1983 with help from the Free Chol Soo Lee Defense Committee.
- John Irving Lewis (born 1971): a member of the Gang of Four who were convicted in the Puente Hills Mall Murders in the summer of 1991.
- Gunner Lindberg (born 1975): stabbed a Vietnamese man to death in a racially motivated attack. Sentenced to death in 1996.
- Bruce Lisker: wrongly convicted in the 1983 murder of his mother, Dorka, when he was 17. Exonerated and released from prison in 2009, at age 44.
- Russ Little: member of the Symbionese Liberation Army accused of, but eventually acquitted of, the murder of educator Marcus Foster. Released and moved to Hawaii.
- Franklin Lynch (born 1955): convicted serial killer and robber who is suspected in the murders of 13 elderly women in the East Bay during the summer of 1987. He was only charged for three murders and was sentenced to death in 1992.
- Dorothy Mackaye, #440960, a woman, served less than ten months of a one- to three-year sentence in 1928.
- Kelvin Malone: convicted spree killer who murdered several people in California and Missouri. He was sentenced to death in both states, and was extradited to Missouri in 1999 where he was executed.
- Charles Manson: leader of the Manson family. Transferred to multiple prisons during his life. Died from cancer in hospital on November 19, 2017.
- Jarvis Jay Masters (born 1962): participated in the murder of Corrections Officer Hal Burchfield. Sentenced to death in 1990.
- Timothy Joseph McGhee (born 1973): Toonerville Rifa 13 member believed to have shot at least 12 people between 1997 and 2001 and attempted to kill two LAPD officers in an ambush. Sentenced to death in 2009.
- Harold Ray Memro- Serial killer sentenced to death for the murders of three young boys in Southern California. Changed his name to Reno while on death row.
- Charles "Chase" Merritt (born 1957): murdered the McStay family for financial gain. Sentenced to death in 2020.
- Andrew Mickel (born 1979): shot a police officer to death at a gas station. Sentenced to death in 2006.
- S. S. Millard: controversial filmmaker.
- Barry Mills: leader of the Aryan Brotherhood, incarcerated during the 1970s for armed robbery. Died in ADX Florence in 2018.
- David Misch: serial killer, spent 17 months for theft from an April 1989 conviction.
- Jim Mitchell, prominent in the strip club and pornography businesses in San Francisco, spent 1994–1997 in San Quentin for murdering his brother Artie.
- Thomas Mooney: political activist and labor leader who was wrongly accused of the San Francisco Preparedness Day Bombing of 1916. Originally sentenced to death and then life in prison before being pardoned in 1939.
- Michael Morales (born 1959): convicted for the brutal murder of Terri Winchell. Sentenced to death in 1983.
- Frank Morgan: saxophonist and heroin addict who formed an ensemble with Art Pepper.
- Joe "Pegleg" Morgan: influential and first white member of the Mexican Mafia. Died from cancer in Corcoran State Prison in 1993.
- Ed Morrell, accomplice to the Evans-Sontag rail robbery gang who spent five years in solitary confinement; known as the "Dungeon Man" of San Quentin. Pardoned in 1908 and became a well-known advocate of prison reform.
- Wallace Fard Muhammad: founder of the Nation of Islam.
- Joseph Naso (born 1934): serial killer who raped and murdered at least six women. Sentenced to death in 2013.
- Earle Nelson: serial killer and necrophile who raped and murdered at least 21 women and an infant boy in the 1920s. Spent time in San Quentin for breaking and entering as a teenager.
- Charles Ng (born 1960): serial killer who tortured and murdered 11 people with Leonard Lake (who died by suicide by cyanide after arrest in 1985). Finally, Ng was extradited from Canada to the United States, and sentenced to death in February 1999.
- Michael "Irish" O'Farrell: Hells Angels leader.
- Raymond Lee Oyler (born 1971): convicted of setting the Esperanza Fire that claimed the lives of five firemen. Sentenced to death in 2009.
- Gerald Parker (born 1955): serial killer and rapist who killed at least six women and an unborn baby. Sentenced to death in 1999.
- Art Pepper: saxophonist and heroin addict who formed an ensemble with Frank Morgan.
- Scott Peterson (born 1972): convicted of the murder of his pregnant wife Laci Peterson and their unborn child, Conner, in a much-publicized trial. Sentenced to death in 2005, but resentenced to life without parole in 2021.
- Gregory Powell: kidnapped two policemen and shot one of them dead in the Onion Field Murder. Sentenced to death, but commuted to life in prison. Died from cancer in the California Medical Facility in 2012.
- Alfredo Prieto: serial killer and gang member who raped and shot five people in Southern California in 1990. Was later transferred to Virginia and executed there for a double murder in 2015.
- Cleophus Prince Jr. (born 1967): serial killer who raped and murdered six women in San Diego in 1990. Sentenced to death in 1993.
- Richard Ramirez: serial killer known as "The Night Stalker", convicted of killing 13 people. Sentenced to death in 1989. Died of lymphoma in hospital in 2013.
- David Allen Raley (born 1961): security guard who kidnapped and tortured two teenage girls, killing one of them. Sentenced to death in 1988.
- Hans Reiser: developer of the ReiserFS file system and convicted for the murder of his wife, sentenced to 15 years to life in 2008. He is currently at Mule Creek State Prison.
- Joe Remiro (born 1947): member of the Symbionese Liberation Army who murdered educator Marcus Foster in 1973. Incarcerated in Pelican Bay State Prison.
- Abe Ruef: San Francisco political boss, for bribery.
- Ramon Salcido (born 1961): convicted in 1989 of seven murders, including six relatives and his boss. Sentenced to death in 1990.
- San Quentin Six: six inmates who participated in a riot during an escape attempt in 1971 that resulted in the deaths of six people. Fleeta Drumgo was shot dead after he was released in 1979 and Hugo Pinell was stabbed to death during a riot in 2015 after spending 45 years in solitary confinement.
- Vincent Sanchez (born 1973): the "Simi Valley Rapist". Serial rapist convicted of 79 felony counts, including the first-degree murder, felony kidnapping and rape of Megan Barosso, as well as burglary, rape, and various sex offenses and other charges against 15 other victims. Sentenced to death in 2003.
- Sanyika Shakur: Member of the Crips and author. Spent 36 months in San Quentin.
- Glen Sherley: musician who spent time in San Quentin in the 1960s.
- Wesley Shermantine (born 1966): one half of the Speed Freak Killers serial killer duo, believed to have killed as many as 70 people. Sentenced to death in 2001. His accomplice, Loren Herzog, committed suicide in 2012.
- Thomas Silverstein: leader of the Aryan Brotherhood, incarcerated during the 1970s for armed robbery. Died in ADX Florence in 2019.
- Mitchell Sims (born 1960): convicted May 20, 1987, of the hotel-room murder of Domino's Pizza deliveryman John Harrington in Glendale; also sentenced to death in South Carolina for the murders of two Domino's employees in that state. Sentenced to death in 1987.
- Lawrence Singleton: raped and cut the forearms off a teenage girl before leaving her for dead. Was controversially released after serving eight years and was forced to live on the grounds of San Quentin in a trailer while on parole. Murdered a woman in Florida and died in North Florida Reception Center in 2001.
- Sirhan Sirhan: assassin of Robert F. Kennedy, sent to death row at San Quentin in May 1969. After the California Supreme Court struck down the death penalty as cruel and unusual punishment, Sirhan was transferred to Correctional Training Facility. He is currently at Donovan State Prison.
- Cary Stayner (born 1961): serial killer convicted of killing four women in Yosemite. Sentenced to death in 2002.
- William Suff (born 1950): serial killer convicted of murdering 12 women in Riverside County. Sentenced to death in 1995.
- Regis Deon Thomas (born 1970): convicted of the murders of three people including two Compton Police officers. Sentenced to death in 1995.
- Danny Trejo: actor, inmate between 1965 and 1968.
- Chester Turner (born 1966): serial killer convicted of murdering 14 women in Los Angeles between 1987 and 1998. Sentenced to death in 2007.
- John Pence Wagner: prison evangelist-inmate between 1966 and 1972. writer of the poem featured on the rear cover of the 1971 album "Guilty!" by Jimmy Witherspoon and Eric Burdon. Died from cancer in 1999.
- Darnell Keith Washington (born 1988): convicted of killing a woman during a home invasion. Sentenced to death in 2016.
- Tex Watson: a former associate of the Charles Manson "Family", currently serving a life sentence in prison.
- Ward Weaver Jr. (born 1947): father of convicted murderer Ward Weaver III, who shot and killed two teenagers. Sentenced to death in 1985.
- Marcus Wesson (born 1946): convicted of killing nine of his family members. Sentenced to death in 2005.
- David Westerfield (born 1952): convicted of kidnapping and killing seven-year-old Danielle van Dam. Sentenced to death in 2003.
- Anthony Wimberly: serial killer arrested for grand theft auto. Currently incarcerated in Mule Creek State Prison.
- Earlonne Woods: convicted of attempted armed robbery. Most known for his work in co-creating and co-hosting the award-winning podcast, Ear Hustle along with Nigel Poor. His sentence was commuted by Governor Jerry Brown on November 30, 2018.
- Daniel Wozniak (born 1984): convicted of murdering and dismembering Samuel Herr and then murdering Julie Kibuishi in a plot to steal money to fund his wedding. Sentenced to death in 2016.
- Verlin Spencer (born 1903): perpetrator of the 1940 South Pasadena Junior High School shooting. He would later be found not guilty by reason of Settled insanity and transferred to California Medical Facility, being released on parole in 1970. He would later die in 1991.

=== Deaths in prison ===
- Stuart Alexander: convicted in the 2000 shooting deaths of three USDA meat officials he claimed were harassing him. Sentenced to death in 2004. Died from a pulmonary embolism on December 27, 2005.
- Robert Biehler: serial killer responsible for four murders in Los Angeles. Died from cancer on January 10, 1993.
- Lawrence Bittaker: serial killer convicted of torturing and murdering five teenage girls. Found dead in his cell on December 13, 2019
- Richard Chase: "vampire killer", in 1979 sentenced to death in gas chamber for murdering six people. Committed suicide by drug overdose on December 26, 1980.
- Doug Clark: serial killer and necrophile who killed six women with a female accomplice. Sentenced to death in 1983. Died of natural causes on October 11, 2023.
- Robert Wayne Danielson: serial killer who was sentenced to death for two murders that occurred in Mendocino County. Committed suicide by hanging on September 7, 1995.
- Mack Ray Edwards: child sex abuser/serial killer who buried bodies under freeways on which he worked. Committed suicide by hanging in prison cell on October 30, 1971.
- Lonnie David Franklin, Jr.: convicted of ten murders and one attempted murder in Los Angeles, California. The attacker was dubbed the "Grim Sleeper" because he appeared to have taken a 14-year break from his crimes from 1988 to 2002. Found dead in his cell on March 28, 2020.
- Phillip Carl Jablonski: convicted of killing five women. Found dead in his cell on December 27, 2019.
- George Jackson: co-founder of the Black Guerrilla Family and one of the Soledad Brothers. Shot to death during an escape attempt on August 21, 1971.
- Anthony McKnight: serial killer, rapist, and kidnapper sentenced to death for the murders of five women in 1985. Found dead in his cell on October 17, 2019.
- James Mitose: martial artist convicted of murder. Died from diabetes complications on March 26, 1981.
- J. C. X. Simon: member of a group of Black Muslims who committed racially motivated murders in San Francisco in the 1970s known as the Zebra murders. Found dead in his cell on March 12, 2015.
- Morris Solomon, Jr.: serial killer convicted of murdering six women in Sacramento. Sentenced to death in 1992. Died on August 1, 2024.
- Mark Squires: sex offender convicted of assaulting minors in Riverside County. Found dead in his cell on September 17, 2024, with a homicide investigation pending.
- Anthony Sully: serial killer and former police officer convicted of murdering six people in Burlingame in 1983. Sentenced to death in 1986. Died of natural causes on September 8, 2023.
- Andrew Urdiales, serial killer who killed eight women. Committed suicide on November 2, 2018.
- Brandon Wilson: convicted in the 1998 slashing death of nine-year-old Matthew Cecchi. Sentenced to death in 1999. Committed suicide on November 17, 2011.
- Leung Ying: mass murder who killed 11 people on a farm with a rifle and hatchet. Sentenced to death and committed suicide in his cell two weeks before his execution.

==== COVID-19 related deaths ====
In 2020, 12 death row inmates at San Quentin died in the span of less than two months after a COVID-19 outbreak. All of the inmates were hospitalized before their deaths.

- Richard Eugene Stitely, 71, died on June 24, 2020.
- Joseph S. Cordova, 75, died on July 1, 2020.
- Scott Erskine, 57, and Manuel Machado Alvarez, 59, both died on July 3, 2020.
- Dewayne Michael Carey, 59, died on July 4, 2020.
- David John Reed, 60, died on July 7, 2020.
- Jeffrey Jay Hawkins, 64, died on July 15, 2020.
- Troy Adam Ashmus, 58, died on July 20, 2020.
- John Michael Beames, 67, died on July 21, 2020.
- Johnny Avila Jr., 62, died on July 26, 2020.
- Orlando Gene Romero, 48, died on August 2, 2020.
- Pedro Arias, 58, died on August 9, 2020.

=== Executed ===
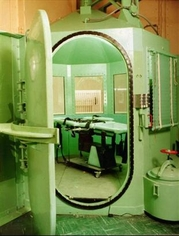
The San Quentin gas chamber originally employed lethal hydrogen cyanide gas for the purpose of carrying out capital punishment. It was later converted to a lethal injection execution chamber but was restored to its original purpose when a new lethal injection chamber was built.

- Theodore Durrant: convicted of murdering two women in San Francisco. Executed by hanging on January 7, 1898.
- Willie Louis: son of Ah Louis, convicted of the murder of Gon Ying Louis. Executed by hanging on December 16, 1912.
- Louis Fortine: convicted of murdering his employer, Peter M. Furrer, and Furrer's wife and infant. Executed by hanging on July 21, 1916.
- Mose Gibson: convicted of murdering a man but confessed to seven total murders before his death. Executed by hanging on September 24, 1920.
- William Edward Hickman: convicted of kidnapping, mutilating, and murdering 12-year-old Marion Parker, died by hanging on October 19, 1928.
- Gordon Stewart Northcott: convicted of killing three boys in the Wineville Chicken Coop Murders, executed by hanging on October 2, 1930.
- Ed Davis: bank robber who killed a warden during an escape attempt from Folsom State Prison. Executed by gas chamber on December 16, 1938.
- William Johansen: serial killer who murdered three women, including his wife, in New York and California between 1933 and 1940; executed by gas chamber on September 5, 1941.
- Juanita Spinelli: first woman executed in San Quentin's gas chamber on November 22, 1941.
- Raymond "Rattlesnake James" Lisenba: convicted of killing his wife, he was the last man to be executed by hanging in California on May 1, 1942.
- Sam Shockley and Miran Edgar Thompson: convicted of killing a guard in the 1946 Battle of Alcatraz escape attempt, executed together in the gas chamber on December 3, 1948.
- Louise Peete: convicted murderer, executed in the gas chamber on April 11, 1947.
- Billy Cook: murderer of Carl Mosser, his wife Thelma, their three small children and motorist Robert Dewey. He died in the gas chamber on December 12, 1952.
- Lloyd Gomez: convicted serial killer who murdered nine homeless men, executed in the gas chamber on October 16, 1953.
- Barbara Graham: convicted murderer, executed in the gas chamber on June 3, 1955.
- Burton Abbott: convicted of the rape and murder of a teenage girl; executed in the gas chamber on March 15, 1957.
- Vender Duncan: convicted of raping and murdering two elderly women, executed in the gas chamber on May 29, 1959.
- Stephen A. Nash: a serial killer who confessed to murdering five to 11 men and boys. Convicted of two murders and later put to death in the gas chamber on August 21, 1959.
- Harvey Glatman: convicted of raping and strangling two women, he died in the gas chamber on September 18, 1959.
- Caryl Chessman: convicted rapist, was given the death penalty in 1948 and executed on May 2, 1960. The last man executed in California for a sexual offense that did not also involve murder.
- Henry Busch: convicted serial killer who murdered three women and planned to murder a fourth. Executed by gas chamber on June 6, 1962.
- Elizabeth Ann Duncan: convicted of hiring two men to kill her daughter-in-law, executed by gas chamber on August 8, 1962. Fourth and last woman to be executed in San Quentin.
- Aaron Mitchell: convicted of shooting a Sacramento police officer, executed by gas chamber on April 12, 1967.
- Robert Alton Harris: convicted of murdering two boys after serving time for manslaughter, died in the gas chamber on April 21, 1992.
- David Mason: convicted serial killer, he was the last man to be executed in the gas chamber on August 24, 1993.
- William Bonin: convicted serial killer, the "Freeway Killer" (one of three men to have the same nickname) became the first person in California history to be executed by lethal injection on February 23, 1996.
- Keith Daniel Williams: convicted triple murderer, executed by lethal injection on May 3, 1996.
- Thomas Martin Thompson: convicted of the 1981 killing of Ginger Fleischli, executed by lethal injection on July 14, 1998.
- Jaturun Siripongs: convicted of two 1981 murders, executed by lethal injection on February 9, 1999.
- Manny Babbitt: convicted murderer who died by lethal injection on May 4, 1999.
- Darrell Keith Rich: convicted serial killer, executed by lethal injection on March 15, 2000.
- Robert Lee Massie: convicted murderer, executed by lethal injection on March 27, 2001.
- Stephen Wayne Anderson: contract killer and serial killer, executed by lethal injection on January 29, 2002.
- Donald Beardslee: convicted serial killer, executed by lethal injection on January 19, 2005.
- Stanley "Tookie" Williams: convicted spree killer, co-founder and early leader of the Crips street gang. Author (several children's books about his experience at San Quentin) and cause célèbre. Executed by lethal injection on December 13, 2005.
- Clarence Ray Allen: convicted for ordering the killing of three people. At age 76, he was the oldest person ever executed in California (by lethal injection on January 17, 2006) and the last in the entire state of California.

=== Administration ===
- Leo Stanley (1886 – 1976), American surgeon who served as the Chief Surgeon from 1913 to 1951.

== In media ==
=== Television ===
- San Quentin is on the rotation of prisons featured on MSNBC's show Lockup, a TV documentary series on life in prison.
- San Quentin appears in various overhead shots on The CW's shows The Flash and Arrow, serving as Iron Heights Penitentiary.
- San Quentin is featured in the 2008 BBC Two special Louis Theroux: Behind Bars.
- Miles, one of the main characters in Starz's Blindspotting, is incarcerated at San Quentin.

=== Performances and music videos ===
- Country music singer Johnny Cash performed at San Quentin at least twice in his career. The first was in 1958, which included among its audience members a young and incarcerated Merle Haggard. Upon his release from prison, Haggard was inspired to pursue music in part because of that concert. Eleven years later, on February 24, 1969, Cash played another live concert for the prison inmates. The 1969 concert was released as an album At San Quentin and as a television documentary Johnny Cash in San Quentin (filmed by Granada Television). "A Boy Named Sue", taken from the concert, was Cash's only Billboard Hot 100 top ten hit, peaking at number two, and winning the 1970 Grammy Award for Best Male Country Vocal Performance. During the concert, the song "San Quentin", about an inmate's loathing for the prison, received such an enthusiastic response that Cash immediately played an encore.
- In 1990, B. B. King recorded Live at San Quentin in the prison; it won a Grammy Award for Best Traditional Blues Album in 1991.
- On November 19, 1957, San Francisco Actors Workshop put on a performance of Waiting for Godot, despite concerns the audience of 1,400 prisoners would not understand the play, it received a standing ovation and would inspire inmates to perform the play
- In 2003, heavy metal band Metallica filmed the music video for their song "St. Anger" from the album of the same name in San Quentin, which featured many of the prison inmates and security staff, and also included then-new bassist Robert Trujillo for the first time since being inducted into the band. Parts of the filming of the "St. Anger" video and behind the scenes were included in the group's Some Kind of Monster film in 2004.
- On September 7, 2022, the hard rock band Nickelback released a song named "San Quentin".

=== Film ===
- The 1933 film Ladies They Talk About featured Barbara Stanwyck as an inmate.
- The 1937 film San Quentin featured Pat O'Brien as the captain of the yard and Humphrey Bogart as an inmate.
- William Beaudine directed the film Men of San Quentin (1942).
- Humphrey Bogart played a character who escapes from San Quentin in the 1947 film, Dark Passage.
- The 1954 film Duffy of San Quentin tells the story of Clinton Duffy, who was warden of San Quentin between 1940 and 1952.
- In 1968, the prison scenes in Woody Allen's film Take the Money and Run were shot in San Quentin.
- In the 1993 film Blood In Blood Out, which shows main character Miklo Velka imprisoned in San Quentin.
- Quentin, the main villain in the 1997 film Cube, is named after the prison.
- In the 1999 film 10 Things I Hate About You, it is rumored that Patrick Verona, a character played by Heath Ledger, spent a year in San Quentin.
- The 2013 film Fruitvale Station used the prison, in which real life character Oscar Grant did time, as a filming location for a flashback scene. Actual prisoners served as extras.
- In the 2015 film Ant-Man, the main character Scott Lang / Ant-Man is imprisoned then released from San Quentin for burglary.
- In the 2015 Get Hard, Will Ferrell's character James King is sent to San Quentin for six months on federal tax fraud charges.
- In the 2018 film Venom and its 2021 sequel Venom: Let There Be Carnage, where the serial killer Cletus Kasady is imprisoned. Eddie Brock visits him to conduct the first of a series of interviews in the post-credits scene.

=== Fiction, literature and publications ===
Gang-pulp author Margie Harris wrote a story on San Quentin for the short-lived pulp magazine Prison Stories. The story, titled "Big House Boomerang", appeared in the March 1931 issue. It used San Quentin's brutal jute mill as its setting. Harris' knowledge of the prison came from her days as a newspaper reporter in the Bay Area, and her acquaintance with famous San Quentin prisoner Ed Morrell.

The 1915 novel The Star Rover by Jack London was based in San Quentin. A framing story is told in the first person by Darrell Standing, a university professor serving life imprisonment in San Quentin State Prison for murder. Prison officials try to break his spirit by means of a torture device called "the jacket", a canvas jacket which can be tightly laced so as to compress the whole body, inducing angina. Standing discovers how to withstand the torture by entering a kind of trance state, in which he walks among the stars and experiences portions of past lives.

=== Podcasts ===
- Ear Hustle is a podcast created by Earlonne Woods and artist Nigel Poor. The podcast interviews inmates at San Quentin about life on the inside.

== See also ==
- San Quentin Six: the six inmates who were accused of participating in the August 21, 1971 escape attempt that left six people dead.
- Films set in San Quentin State Prison
- The Last Mile (prison rehabilitation program)
- List of current inmates at San Quentin Rehabilitation Center
