= Campaign to End the Death Penalty =

- Founded: 2004
- Type: National grassroots organization
- Purpose: Human rights activism
- Location: United States; headquarters in Chicago
- Method: Petitioning, media work, protests
- Employees: 5
- Website: nodeathpenalty.org

The Campaign to End the Death Penalty (CEDP) is an anti-death penalty organization in the United States, built on the philosophy that death row inmates and their family members must be at the center of fighting to abolish the death penalty. According to CEDP, "Abolition will not come from the desks of local politicians or the power brokers in Washington, whose lives have likely never been touched by the death penalty and whose careers have often been bolstered by it. Abolition can only come from organizing within communities and from people demanding a change."

== Overview ==
CEDP has chapters in California, Texas, Delaware, New York, and Chicago. As of 2016 it has a staff of five. It was founded in 2004 and is based in Chicago. CEDP is a member of the World Coalition Against the Death Penalty. Its national board includes Yusuf Salaam, one of the since-exonerated Central Park 5, whose death was publicly urged by Donald Trump in 1989.

CEDP gained prominence in attempting to save Stan "Tookie" Williams, who was executed in California on December 13, 2005, after being denied clemency by governor Arnold Schwarzenegger. Previously, the CEDP was heavily involved in defending Kevin Cooper, a California inmate who was granted a new trial on the day he was scheduled to be executed, as well as Chicago's Death Row 10, death row inmates who the CEDP claims were sentenced on the basis of confessions extracted by police torture. Four of the Death Row 10 were pardoned in 2002 by then-Illinois governor George Ryan, who also emptied the state's death row in a mass commutation of sentences.

The organization also opposes life imprisonment without parole. In 2016 CEDP surveyed death row inmates on their views of two California ballot measures, Propositions 62 and 66. The inmates opposed Proposition 66, which calls for the speed-up of executions in California. However, inmates also opposed Proposition 62, since it enforces life imprisonment without parole, which is characterized by inmates, according to CEDP director Lilly Hughes, as "just a death sentence with a different name."

CEDP publishes a newsletter, The New Abolitionist.
