= Chris Ponnet =

American Roman Catholic priest (1957–2025)

- Born: January 14, 1957; Monterey Park, California, U.S.
- Died: October 7, 2025 (aged 68); Arcadia, California, U.S.
- Education: St. John's Seminary (California)
- Occupations: Roman Catholic priest; hospital chaplain; social justice activist
- Years active: 1983–2025
- Organization(s): Archdiocese of Los Angeles, St. Camillus Center for Spiritual Care, LAC+USC Medical Center, Pax Christi, Death Penalty Focus
- Known for: Advocacy for peace, racial justice, immigrant rights, abolition of the death penalty, HIV/AIDS ministry, LGBTQ Catholic ministry
- Awards: Distinguished Alumni Award (St. John's Seminary, 2022), Teacher of Peace Award nominee (Pax Christi, 2021)

Christopher Dennis Ponnet (January 14, 1957 – October 7, 2025) was an American Roman Catholic priest, hospital chaplain and social justice activist. He served in the Archdiocese of Los Angeles at the St. Camillus Center for Spiritual Care and as director of spiritual care at LAC+USC Medical Center. Ponnet also held roles in ministries serving people with HIV/AIDS, LGBTQ Catholics, and with different organizations and events including Pax Christi, Los Angeles Religious Education Congress, Los Angeles Catholic Worker, and Death Penalty Focus.

Ponnet was active in movements for peace, racial justice, immigrant rights, and abolition of the death penalty. He participated in interfaith ceremonies for the burial of unclaimed remains in Los Angeles County and was repeatedly arrested in acts of civil disobedience. His work integrated pastoral care, public witness, and education on Catholic social teaching. His work earned recognition from religious organizations, including a nomination for the Teacher of Peace Award by Pax Christi in 2021.

== Early life and family ==
Ponnet was born January 14, 1957 in Monterey Park, California, and was raised in Temple City. He was one of eight children, and he attended St. Luke Church in Temple City. He was baptized at St. Luke and attended that parish's school. His father died when he was four years old and the family often visited his grave. After studying at St. John's Seminary (California), he was ordained a priest in 1983 in the Archdiocese of Los Angeles. In 2022, he received a distinguished alumni award from St. John's.

== Pastoral work and advocacy ==
=== HIV/AIDS ===
Ponnet worked during the AIDS epidemic, offering support for people living with HIV/AIDS and those dying during that epidemic. In 1986, Cardinal Roger Mahony started the archdiocese's HIV/AIDS ministry, which Ponnet participated in. He ministered to people living with HIV/AIDS at LAC+USC. In the early days of epidemic, he remembered being heavily involved in accompaniment of persons during illness and death. He volunteered with the AIDS Walk and World AIDS Day. He assisted scholars studying religious congregations' involvement in HIV ministry.

=== LGBTQ ===
Ponnet led the Catholic Ministry with Lesbian and Gay Persons in the Archdiocese of Los Angeles. He recalled the ministry being formed during the height of AIDS epidemic. In 2016, he participated in a vigil after the Pulse nightclub shooting. In 2024, he supported Pope Francis's 2023 declaration allowing spontaneous blessings for same-sex couples, viewing them as pastoral acts for individuals, not endorsements of their unions. He guided priests on offering these blessings, distinct from marriage, which respected the church's teaching as a sacrament between a man and a woman. Ponnet told NPR that he declined to attend same-sex weddings to avoid implying church approval. Some conservative Catholics have criticized Ponnet for his work with the LGBT community within the church.

=== COVID-19 pandemic ===
During the COVID-19 pandemic, Ponnet and his team at Los Angeles General Medical Center adapted spiritual care under public health restrictions. He offered support in person when possible at the hospital, and via remote means when necessary, including administering sacraments under these conditions. He had to adapt how to administer last rites. He spoke about the difficulty of family not being able to be together in their final moments. He received the COVID-19 vaccine in December 2020 and urged others to get vaccinated.

=== Burial of unclaimed remains ===
Ponnet coordinated or assisted interfaith services in which ashes or remains of unclaimed individuals from Los Angeles County were buried. He regularly participated in such a ceremony at Evergreen Cemetery in Boyle Heights. Ponnet was one of the original organizers of the interfaith service although the burial ritual had been occurring since around 1896. He introduced music and poetry to the event. The service would typically honor the deceased whose ashes had not been claimed for three years.

=== Protests and civil disobedience ===
His participation in protests and civil disobedience resulted in over thirty arrests. In 1987, he was arrested during a protest at a Nuclear Weapons Test Site in Nevada sponsored by Pax Christi USA. In June 1990, Ponnet joined religious leaders protesting U.S. military aid to El Salvador by gathering at the Covina office of Representative David Dreier and urging cuts to military assistance. In May 1991, as associate pastor at Our Lady of the Assumption Church in Claremont, Ponnet undertook a fast in protest of the "Hollywood's Welcome Home Desert Storm Parade", challenging the public display and glorification of weaponry. He framed the parade's military symbolism as problematic. In March 1993, he was among demonstrators who blocked the main entrance to the 300 North Los Angeles Street Federal Building to protest human rights violations in El Salvador. He was arrested along with eight others. In the July 1992 Sojourners article "After the Simi Valley Verdict", published following the acquittal of police officers in the beating of Rodney King, Ponnet was listed among those who joined the public confession and reflection that year.

In October 2011, he was arrested at the conclusion of an interfaith peace rally in downtown Los Angeles that blocked Los Angeles Street, marking the 10th anniversary of the War in Afghanistan. He was pictured with Cornel West at the rally. He wrote about the rally. In 2016, he was among faith leaders arrested at a protest against United States Immigration and Customs Enforcement raids targeting families. In 2025, in the wake of the June 2025 Los Angeles protests against mass deportation, he participated in the "Coalition of Faithful Resistance" prayer and protest vigil.

=== Anti-death penalty advocacy ===
Ponnet was a longtime member of Death Penalty Focus, serving on its board of directors. He co-chaired Catholics Against the Death Penalty Southern California (CADPSC). He participated in public education and advocacy efforts, including signature gathering, speaker bureau work, and parish-based outreach, aiming to inform both the public and policy makers about abolition of capital punishment. At the 2016 Religious Education Congress in Anaheim, he urged California voters to abolish the death penalty through ballot measures. He was on a panel with Mike Farrell and Greg Boyle. Following the failure of 2016 California Proposition 62 and the passage of 2016 California Proposition 66 in November 2016, Ponnet expressed disappointment and argued that reforms shortening the capital punishment process (as in Prop 66) would worsen outcomes rather than remedy injustice. In late 2018, Ponnet helped collect nearly 6,000 letters from Catholics and other community members urging Governor Jerry Brown to commute the sentences of individuals on death row before his term ended. He cited the updated Catholic Catechism (which reaffirms that the death penalty is "inadmissible") and the need for restorative justice.

== Death ==
Ponnet died during heart surgery on October 7, 2025, at the age of 68, in Arcadia, California. The Archdiocese of Los Angeles issued a statement following his death, as did Pax Christi.
