= Bruce Millsap =

American serial killer

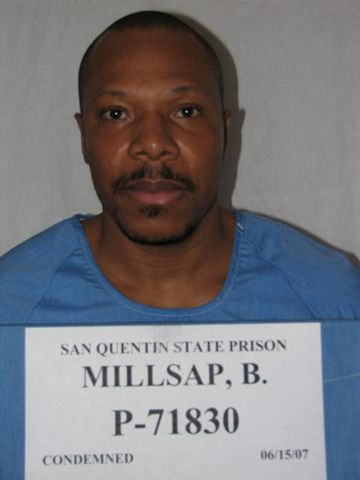
- Born: March 21, 1967 (age 59); Los Angeles County, California, U.S.
- Motive: Robbery; Witness elimination
- Convictions: First degree murder with special circumstances (8 counts); Attempted murder Robbery (Note: He was convicted of 15 counts total for the other crimes)
- Penalty: Death

Details
- Victims: 8 (3 with Kendrick Loot)
- Span of crimes: 1995–1996
- Country: United States
- State: California
- Locations: Los Angeles County, Orange County, San Bernardino County

Bruce Millsap (born March 21, 1967) is an American serial killer, robber, and Crips gang leader who was convicted of eight murders during robberies across Southern California. His case received attention when, in 2016, Teri Nichols, an assistant teacher for the Los Angeles Unified School District, was caught attempting to smuggle in heroin and cellphones to him while he was in prison.

== Victims and convictions ==
- Ramone McKissick, November 15, 1995
- Fernando Herrera, November 30, 1995
- Manuel Garibay, January 31, 1996
- James Moon, February 9, 1996
- Francisco Parocua, August 1996
- Carlos Nuno, August 1996
- Patrick Barnett, August 1996
- Lamont Smith, November 3, 1996

Millsap was a leader of a Crips set in Carson, California. Alongside four accomplices, Millsap committed robberies targeting armored cars in several cities, including Carson, Los Angeles, Lakewood, Long Beach, Garden Grove, Bellflower, Stanton, Highland, and San Bernardino. In addition to seven victims murdered during the robberies, Millsap killed an eighth person, Manuel Garibay, who was a witness in a legal process against him. Millsap used the stolen money to buy cars and a house in Riverside County. Millsap's gang, consisting of 21 members, was arrested in 1997, with an additional 13 murders attributed to the gang.

One of Millsap's accomplices, Kendrick Loot, was convicted of murdering Herrera, McKissick, and Moon. In addition, the two were also convicted of several counts of either robbery or attempted robbery as well as attempted murder. Both were sentenced to death in February 2000, with Millsap receiving eight death sentences and 200 years imprisonment while Loot received one death sentence and two life sentences. It was alleged that Millsap had also planned the murder of two deputy district attorneys presiding over the case as well as two witnesses. The third accomplice, Roshone Colston (also named as Richard Colston), had agreed to testify against Millsap and Loot, still facing trial for four counts of murder. The fourth accomplice, Emanuel Brown, killed himself in jail before trial.

== Prison contraband ==
In August 2016, Teri Nichols, a teaching assistant from Los Angeles, attempted to bring Millsap heroin, pills, and 18 cellphones along with chargers for each of them. Prison officials caught her in the visiting room and she was later charged in Marin County court with one count of bringing a controlled substance into a prison as well as a misdemeanor charge for possession with intent to deliver a wireless device to an inmate. In November 2017, Nichols pleaded guilty to one count of possessing a controlled substance in prison while two other charges against her were dropped. As part of her plea deal, she was sentenced to six months in jail.

== See also ==
- List of serial killers in the United States
- Capital punishment in California
- List of death row inmates in the United States § California
