= James French (murderer) =

American murderer (c. 1936–1966)

- Born: June 16, 1936; Peoria, Illinois, U.S.
- Died: August 10, 1966 (aged 30); Oklahoma State Penitentiary, Oklahoma, U.S.
- Status: Executed by electrocution
- Conviction: First degree murder (2 counts)
- Penalty: Life imprisonment (Boone murder); Death (Shelton murder)

Details
- Victims: Franklin Boone; Eddie Lee Shelton

James Donald French (June 16, 1936 (Note: U.S. Census records from both 1940 and 1950 suggest French was born in 1938 rather than 1936; however, a newspaper article on his execution states that he was "born 30 years ago last June 16", which would have been 1936, as the article was published on August 11, 1966.) – August 10, 1966) was an American double murderer who was the last person executed under Oklahoma's death penalty laws prior to Furman v. Georgia, which suspended capital punishment in the United States from 1972 until 1976.

French was convicted of the 1961 murder of Eddie Lee Shelton, his cellmate, while he was serving a sentence of life imprisonment for the 1958 murder of motorist Franklin Boone. French ultimately faced trial three times for Shelton's murder, with his sentence being overturned twice; French requested a death sentence and waived his appeals, fighting multiple efforts from attorneys hired by third parties to spare his life despite application of the death penalty otherwise being at a near standstill in Oklahoma and the United States as a whole.

Aside from being the final person executed in Oklahoma before the Furman v. Georgia ruling, French was the third-to-last person executed in the United States prior to the ruling, surpassed only by Aaron Mitchell in California and Luis Monge in Colorado, who were respectively executed in April 1967 and June 1967. French was the only person executed in the United States in 1966.

== Background and murders ==
French was born on June 16, 1936, and adopted by a couple from Peoria, Illinois, Mr. and Mrs. C.D. French, 19 days after he was born. When French was five years old, he allegedly stabbed a man who he believed was flirting with his mother. When he was a second grade elementary student, he attempted an arson attack on a schoolhouse. Later, after "a forged check spree," he was committed to a psychiatric hospital in Illinois for six months. Later, he was committed to a federal reformatory in Ohio for a 19-month stint. He moved to California and attempted to find work as a racecar driver but was eventually barred from this line of work. Overall, prior to the murder which landed him in prison with a life sentence, French was committed to psychiatric hospitals three times, including one stint in the Eastern State Hospital in Vinita, Oklahoma. While reflecting on these visits, French told reporter Bob Gregory that every committal ended with authorities ultimately finding him mentally sane.

=== Murder of Franklin Boone ===
At the time of the murder for which French was executed, French was serving a life sentence in the Oklahoma State Penitentiary in McAlester for strangling Franklin R. Boone, a 25-year-old West Virginia motorist who had offered French a ride from Amarillo, Texas to Oklahoma while French was hitchhiking, at Stroud, Oklahoma, on December 4, 1958.

French pleaded guilty to Boone's murder and requested a death sentence, but the court sentenced him to life imprisonment in 1959, against his wishes, likely due to a plea deal between his court-appointed attorney and the prosecutor trying his case.

Dismayed, French wrote several letters to the governor asking for a new trial, one in which he could obtain a death sentence, but the authorities did not respond to his letters.

=== Murder of Eddie Shelton ===
While serving his life sentence, French was placed with inmate Eddie Lee Shelton. The two did not get along, in addition to French growing tired of prison life. French would later state that he determined Shelton "wasn't fit to live. He deserved to die".

On October 17, 1961, French killed Shelton: according to Oklahoma County District Judge Charles Owens, who was an assistant attorney general during French's time on death row, French "determined the victim should have a last meal," so French treated Shelton to a steak sandwich from the prison canteen and "allowed" Shelton to go to breakfast. Upon Shelton's return from breakfast, "French wrapped a towel around [Shelton's] neck" as well as a pair of shoelaces and strangled Shelton to death.

French was fully aware of the consequences for his actions, making an immediate voluntary confession and explaining that he murdered Shelton because Shelton "was stupid [...] and refused to shape up." When he went on trial for Shelton's murder, French asked the judge to sentence him to death and deny all future appeals because he wished to die in the electric chair, and he explained that he committed the murder to compel the state of Oklahoma to execute him. The judge obliged his request, imposing a death sentence.

== Trials and appeals ==
Third parties tried to save French's life during his time on death row. He won a total of three trials thanks to the efforts of attorneys working against his wishes. After the first trial, those attorneys won French a new trial based on the fact that jury members saw French in shackles while he was in court, which biased their view of him during the trial. After the second trial, attorneys argued that the judge who presided over the trial gave an improper response to an inquiry by the jury regarding the definition of "life imprisonment". French had his third trial in 1965. All three trials involved French making a full, voluntary, and eager confession to Shelton's murder and giving the exact same reason each time. Each trial ended with a death sentence. The third was the only one that was not successfully appealed, largely because French himself wrote to the Oklahoma Courts of Appeal asking them to reject all future legal efforts made on his behalf to save his life, and the Court of Appeals obliged him.

During his time on death row, psychiatric tests revealed that French was of above average intelligence. Unlike most death row inmates, French had completed high school and two years of post-secondary education at college. He was also the author of a book on crime compulsion called We. The tests also revealed that French had long been suicidal, with one psychiatrist writing that French had "seriously attempted suicide several times in the past but always 'chickened out' at the last minute. His basic (and obviously abnormal) motive in murdering his inoffensive cellmate was to force the state to deliver to him the electrocution to which he felt entitled and which he deeply desired."

== Execution and last words ==
Shortly before his execution, French told prison employees, "I am not dying for murder; I am dying for my beliefs." He also requested that a psychiatrist "hypnotize [him] and find out what is wrong inside of [him]" before his death, a request which went unfulfilled. After French "resisted all efforts to spare his life", he walked calmly into the execution chamber at 10:00 p.m. on August 10, 1966. An Associated Press reporter at the scene wrote that "James Donald French got what he demanded: death in the electric chair", and commented that "he faced death with the same cockiness he faced life".

At the time of French's execution, the death penalty was at a near standstill nationwide since about late 1964, as a result of changing sentiments towards the death penalty. Oklahoma's last execution before French's was that of Richard Dare, who died in the electric chair on June 1, 1963. Dare was executed for murdering his father-in-law and notably spent 717 days awaiting execution after his death sentence, which was unusually long for the time. Dare was executed only after a protracted legal struggle.

Charles Owens was quoted as saying, almost two decades later, that had French not aggressively pursued his own death, he likely never would have been executed. After the Furman v. Georgia ruling six years after French's execution, the U.S. Supreme Court placed a nationwide moratorium on the death penalty, causing every state to re-sentence all condemned inmates to life imprisonment. French's psychiatrist, upon reflecting on the crimes that sent him to the death chamber, wrote: "If Oklahoma had not had the death penalty, it is likely that both of the men murdered by James French would still be alive."

=== Disputed last words ===
It has been alleged that French's last words were: "How's this for your headline? 'French Fries'." The story appeared in 1977 in The Book of Lists. However, contemporaneous accounts of the execution confirm that when prison warden Ray Page asked if French had any last words, French actually replied: "Everything's already been said."

French himself did make a quip about French fries. However, the remark was not made at his execution, but in days prior, when French discussed his upcoming execution with reporter Bob Gregory. Gregory attended the execution and corroborated that French's real last words were, "Everything's already been said." Earlier, however, Gregory had met with French for an interview in the office of the warden of the Oklahoma State Penitentiary. During the interview, Gregory reported that the following exchange took place:

[S]haking hands as French prepared to return to death row, he leaned over to say: "If I were covering my execution, do you know what I'd say in the newspaper headline?"

"What?"

"'French Fries.' See ya."

— Bob Gregory, "They Died for Their Sins", Oklahoma Monthly Magazine (1976)

== Aftermath ==
The execution of James French was the last execution by electric chair in the United States before Furman v. Georgia, and the only execution to occur in the United States in 1966. Overall, it was the third to last nationwide, only being succeeded by that of Aaron Mitchell in California's gas chamber on April 12, 1967, and Luis Monge in Colorado's gas chamber on June 2, 1967.

After the moratorium on capital punishment was lifted, Gary Gilmore became the first person to be executed nationwide when he volunteered for death by firing squad in Utah on January 17, 1977. Two years later, the first post-Furman electrocution occurred when John Spenkelink was executed in Florida on May 25, 1979. The first post-Furman execution in Oklahoma did not occur until September 10, 1990, when Charles Coleman was executed via lethal injection at the Oklahoma State Penitentiary. It was the first execution carried out in Oklahoma in over twenty-four years, since that of French's in 1966.

== See also ==
- Capital punishment in Oklahoma
- List of people executed in Oklahoma (pre-1972)
- List of people executed in the United States, 1965–1972

== Notes ==
Executions carried out in Oklahoma
Preceded by Richard Dare June 1, 1963	James French; August 10, 1966	Succeeded by Charles Coleman September 10, 1990
Executions carried out in the United States
Preceded by Andrew Pixley – Wyoming December 10, 1965	James French – Oklahoma; August 10, 1966	Succeeded by Aaron Mitchell – California April 12, 1967
