= Marshall F. McComb =

American judge (1894–1981)

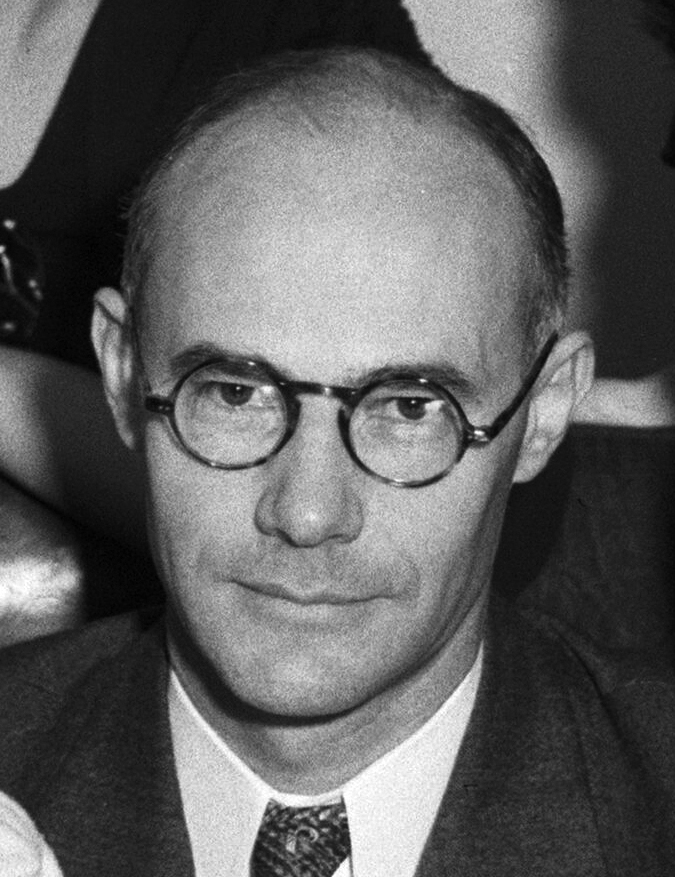
- McComb in 1933

Associate Justice of the Supreme Court of California
- In office January 1956 – May 2, 1977
- Appointed by: Governor Goodwin Knight
- Preceded by: Douglas L. Edmonds
- Succeeded by: Frank C. Newman

Associate Justice of the California Court of Appeal, Second District
- In office March 13, 1937 – January 1956
- Appointed by: Governor Frank Merriam

Personal details
- Born: Marshall Francis McComb; May 6, 1894 Denver, Colorado, U.S.
- Died: September 5, 1981 (aged 87) Los Angeles, California, U.S.
- Spouses: Agnes I. Taylor (m. 1921) Kendra K. Hamilton (m. 1930): Margaret G. McComb
- Education: Stanford University (B.A.); Yale Law School (LL.B.)

Marshall Francis McComb (May 6, 1894 – September 5, 1981) was an American jurist who served as an associate justice of the Supreme Court of California from January 1956 to May 2, 1977.

== Education and early career ==
Born in Denver, Colorado, to Harry McComb and Estelle Tredenick, McComb's family moved to Kingman, Arizona. Then, McComb's family moved to California, and he graduated high school in Los Angeles. In 1917, he earned his Bachelor of Arts degree from Stanford University. On November 24, 1917, during World War I, he was commissioned an ensign in the United States Navy. After his discharge, he resumed his studies and received a Bachelor of Laws degree from Yale Law School cum laude in 1919. In February 1920, he was admitted to the California Bar, then was a Professor of Political Science at the University of California, Los Angeles from 1920 to 1927.

In 1927, California Governor C. C. Young appointed McComb a Judge of the Superior Court of Los Angeles County, where he served until March 1937. Then, Governor Frank Merriam elevated McComb to the California Court of Appeal for the Second District as an associate justice in Division Two, where he served from March 13, 1937 to January 1956.

On February 18, 1932, both McComb and fellow future justice B. Rey Schauer were commissioned as officers in the United States Naval Reserve.

== California Supreme Court ==
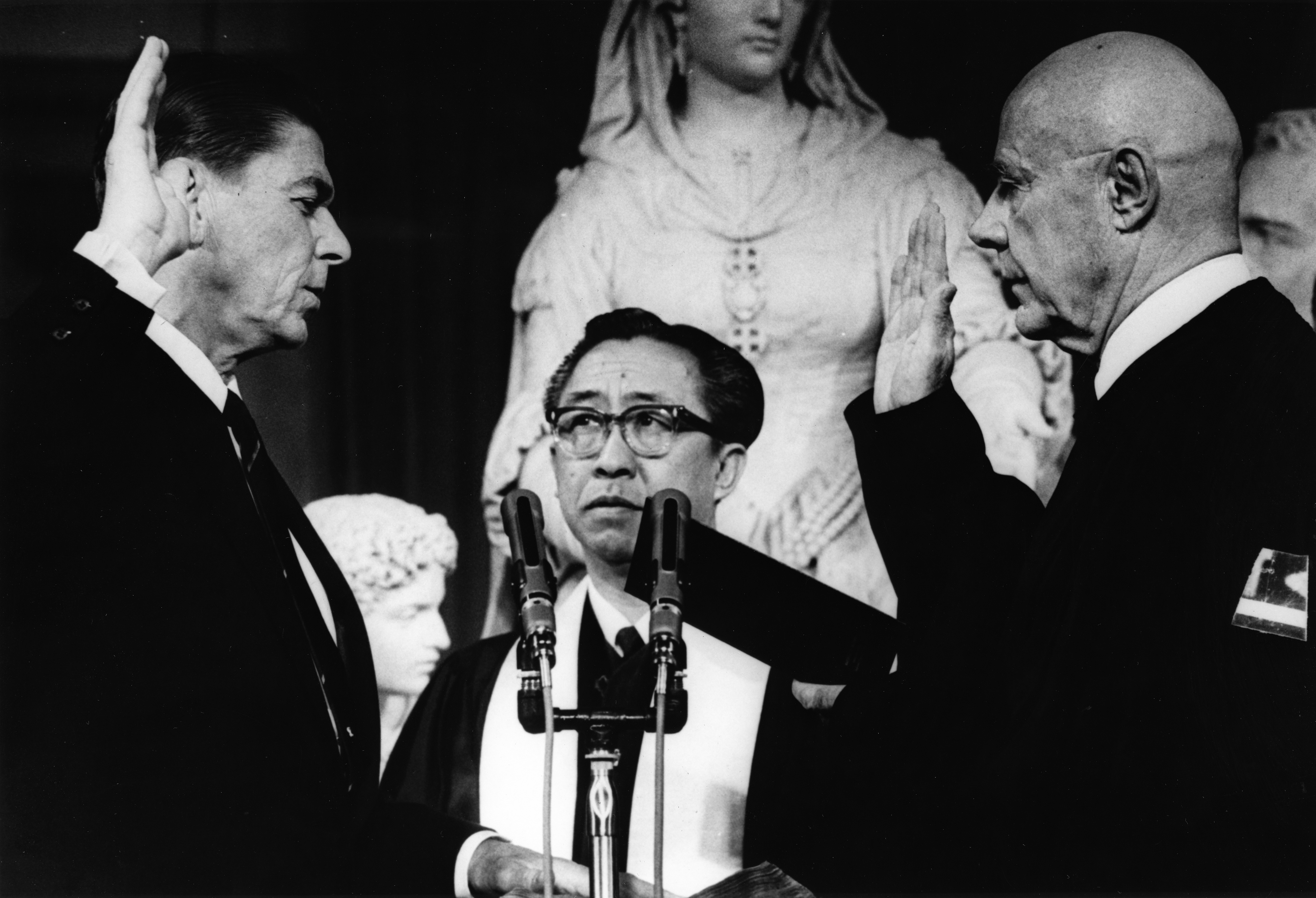
McComb swearing in Ronald Reagan as Governor of California in 1967

In 1955, Governor Goodwin Knight appointed McComb to the Supreme Court of California as an Associate Justice, where he served from January 1956 to May 2, 1977. For much of his career there, McComb formed the core of its conservative wing and often dissented from the liberal majority's opinions. In 1967, McComb swore in Ronald Reagan to the latter's first term as Governor of California.

In 1968, McComb joined the dissenting opinion of Justice Louis H. Burke in Dillon v. Legg, in which the Court's majority established the tort of negligent infliction of emotional distress; Burke and McComb argued that the majority ruling opened up defendants to "potentially infinite liability beyond any rational relationship to their culpability."

In 1962, McComb argued that the death penalty was at least a marginal deterrent to murder. As evidence, he gave 14 separate examples from the city of Los Angeles between 1958 and 1961 in which a total of 18 criminals had claimed that the death penalty had either deterred them from committing murder or caused them to take precaution to avoid committing murder. In one case, for example, an ex-convict had admitted to his probation officer that he thought about shooting and killing his arresting officer, but changed his mind since he was afraid of being executed.

Orelius Mathew Stewart, an ex-convict, with a long felony record, was arrested March 3, 1960, for attempted bank robbery. He was subsequently convicted and sentenced to the state prison. While discussing the matter with his probation officer, he stated: "The officer who arrested me was by himself, and if I had wanted, I could have blasted him. I thought about it at the time, but I changed my mind when I thought of the gas chamber."

In the 1972 case California v. Anderson, in which the majority ruled 6–1 that the death penalty was unconstitutional, McComb was the lone dissenter, arguing that the death penalty deterred crime, noting numerous prior rulings that upheld the death penalty's constitutionality (including 11 in the prior three and a half years), and stating that the legislative and initiative processes were the only appropriate avenues to determine whether the death penalty should be allowed. The majority's decision spared the lives of 105 death row inmates, including Sirhan Sirhan, assassin of Robert F. Kennedy, and serial killer Charles Manson. McComb was so upset about the Anderson decision that he walked out of the courtroom. Nine months later, the people of California would pass Proposition 17 by a 2–1 margin, reinstating the death penalty as an option for all prosecutions that took place after the adoption of Proposition 17.

In 1976, McComb joined Justice William P. Clark, Jr.'s dissenting opinion in Tarasoff v. Regents of the University of California, as McComb and Clark argued that doctor-patient confidentiality was "essential to effectively treat the mentally ill, and that imposing a duty on doctors to disclose patient threats to potential victims would greatly impair treatment" while the majority held that mental health professionals have a duty to protect individuals who are being threatened with bodily harm by a patient.

McComb did join the 1976 court majority in Marvin v. Marvin, in which the court ruled that although California does not recognize common-law marriage, people who cohabitate for long periods of time and commingle their assets are allowed to plead and prove marriage-like contracts for support and division of property.

McComb's distinguished judicial career had a rather sad end. On May 2, 1977, a panel of Court of Appeal justices, sitting as an acting Supreme Court, forced McComb into retirement by affirming a state Commission on Judicial Performance decision that McComb had senile dementia and was no longer able to carry out his judicial duties. In 1981, McComb died in Los Angeles and is buried in Arlington National Cemetery.

== Honors and awards ==
In 1936, McComb was awarded a Doctor of Laws degree from Loyola Law School. In 2005, the McComb Foundation established the Justice Marshall F. McComb Professorship at Southwestern Law School.

== Personal life ==
On August 22, 1921, McComb first married Agnes I. Taylor (Challinor), a widow. They had a daughter, Martha Estelle McComb (Mullin), who graduated from Stanford University in 1944. After McComb and his first wife divorced, on March 22, 1930, he remarried to Kendra K. Hamilton in Yuma, Arizona. He later married Margaret G. McComb, who lived for another 22 years after his death, dying on November 4, 2003.

== See also ==
- List of justices of the Supreme Court of California

Legal offices
Preceded by Douglas L. Edmonds	Associate Justice of the California Supreme Court; 1956 – 1977	Succeeded by Frank C. Newman
Preceded by Gavin W. Craig	Associate Justice of the California Courts of Appeal, Second District, Division Two; 1937 – 1955	Succeeded by Allen W. Ashburn
