= 2016 California Proposition 62 =

Failed ballot proposition to abolish the death penalty

Proposition 62
- Repeal of Death Penalty

Results
Choice	Votes	%
Yes	6,361,788	46.85%
No	7,218,625	53.15%
Valid votes	13,580,413	92.95%
Invalid or blank votes	1,030,096	7.05%
Total votes	14,610,509	100.00%
Registered voters/turnout	19,411,771	75.27%
County results
For
70%–80%
60%–70%
50%–60%
Against
70%–80%
60%–70%
50%–60%

Proposition 62 was a California ballot proposition on the November 8, 2016, ballot that would have repealed the death penalty and replaced it with life imprisonment and forced labor without possibility of parole. It would have applied retroactively to existing death sentences and increased the portion of life inmates' wages that may be applied to victim restitution.

A September 2016 poll from USC Dornsife / Los Angeles Times showed 51% percent of registered voters in favor of Proposition 62, 40% opposed, and 9% unknown.

Proposition 62 was rejected by voters in the November general election, with 46.9% voting to end executions. Proposition 66 was approved by voters in the same election, with 51.1% voting to speed up executions. If voters had passed both Proposition 62 and Proposition 66, then the measure with the most "Yes" votes would have taken effect.

Proposition 62 was estimated to have reduced state spending by $150 million a year. Proponents spent $8.9 million fighting for Proposition 62, with the top contribution being $1.5 million from Stanford University professor Nick McKeown. Other top contributing proponents include Tom Steyer, Reed Hastings, John Doerr, and Paul Graham. The measure was supported by the editorial boards of the Los Angeles Times, the San Francisco Chronicle, and The Sacramento Bee. Opponents spent $4.4 million fighting against Proposition 62, with the top contribution being $498,303 from the California prison guards' union. Other top contributing opponents include the California Highway Patrolmen's union, and the LAPD police union.

== History ==
After the Supreme Court of California abolished the death penalty in People v. Anderson (1972), California voters restored capital punishment in California with California Proposition 17 (1972). However, since 1978, California has executed only 13 prisoners, while the population on death row has increased to 750. No prisoner has been executed since 2006, when a federal judge put a hold on the lethal injection procedure the state was using. Abolition of the death penalty through California Proposition 34, 2012 was rejected by 52% of voters.

The path to the ballot started when Mike Farrell, an American actor and activist, wrote a title and ballot summary on September 15, 2015. A title and summary was then issued by California attorney general's office on November 19, 2015. For a ballot to be qualified, 365,880 valid signatures are needed. On May 2, 2016, petitioners submitted the signatures to county officials. The deadline to submit the required signatures was May 17, 2016. Sponsors of the measure hired PCI Consultants, Inc. to collect signatures for the petition to qualify this measure for the ballot. A total of $3,192,775.30 was spent to collect the 365,880 valid signatures required to put this measure before voters, resulting in a total cost per required signature (CPRS) of $8.73.
