= Charles Coleman (murderer) =

American murderer (1947–1990)

- Born: Charles Troy Coleman; March 15, 1947; Muskogee, Oklahoma, U.S.
- Died: September 10, 1990 (aged 43); Oklahoma State Penitentiary, Oklahoma, U.S.
- Status: Executed by lethal injection
- Conviction: First degree murder
- Penalty: Death (October 12, 1979)

Details
- Victims: 3–4
- Date: February 9, 1979 and April 25, 1979
- Country: United States
- States: Oklahoma and possibly California

Charles Troy Coleman (March 15, 1947 – September 10, 1990) was an American convicted murderer and suspected serial killer who was executed in 1990 by the state of Oklahoma. He was convicted in 1979 of the murder of John Seward, who, along with his wife, was killed by a shotgun blast in rural Muskogee County, when they interrupted a robbery at a relative's house. He also murdered Russell E. Lewis in a fatal carjacking in 1979 and is suspected of murdering the father of his former girlfriend in 1975. Despite being accused of killing at least three people, he was never convicted of the murder of Seward's wife and his sentence for Lewis's murder was overturned.

Coleman was sentenced to death for the murder of John Seward and was executed after almost twelve years on death row at the Oklahoma State Penitentiary. He was executed via lethal injection at the age of 43 after exhausting all appeals. He became the first person to be executed in Oklahoma since the 1966 electrocution of James Donald French after the United States Supreme Court reinstated the death penalty in 1976, and the first person in Oklahoma to be executed by lethal injection.

== Early life ==
Coleman was born on March 15, 1947, in Muskogee, Oklahoma. He was one of eight siblings born into a low-income family that moved states frequently. His parents spent most of their money on alcohol. Coleman was described as a career criminal who had a lengthy criminal history on record. His criminal career began as early as age 11 when he stabbed a mule while gigging frogs with his brother. He then escaped from jail by slipping through the bars of his cell. His father later punished him for the offense by whipping him.

At age 13, Coleman ran away from home. At age 15, he committed a burglary, and one month later, he escaped from a juvenile court after pulling a gun on an officer. At age 16, he got married, and the couple moved around all over the country, living in at least twenty states. Coleman continued to commit crimes and built up a lengthy rap sheet of offenses in multiple states. His offenses included: burglary, grand theft, auto larceny, carrying a concealed weapon, assault with a deadly weapon, and receiving stolen property.

== Murders ==
On August 24, 1975, 44-year-old Will Stidham was found dead inside his pickup truck in Bakersfield, California. He had been beaten to death with a tire iron, and his wallet had been stolen. Stidham was the father of Coleman's girlfriend, 17-year-old Shirley Stidham. Authorities suspected Coleman was involved in the murder because Will Stidham had supposedly told Coleman not to date his daughter. Coleman's fingerprints were also found on the pickup truck Will's body had been found in. One of Coleman's brothers, Abraham Coleman, had allegedly bragged to a woman about being involved in the killing. However, he later denied this and said he had nothing to do with it. He passed a lie detector test, and Shirley Stidham provided Charles Coleman with an alibi, claiming he had been with her when her father had been murdered. However, according to media accounts, several months after the murder, Shirley Stidham had told police that her father had slapped her in front of Coleman. Coleman had then promised her that if she gave him a little more time, her father would not be around any longer. Coleman was prosecuted for the murder but was acquitted in July 1976. Attorneys who prosecuted him claim his charisma and charm helped him gain an acquittal, but they remained convinced he was guilty of the murder.

In January 1979, while serving time in prison in California for a parole violation, Coleman was released and given a thirty-day travel permit to explore job possibilities in Muskogee County, Oklahoma, his native home county. Coleman returned to his home state but remained there longer than the thirty days he had been given. On February 9, 1979, Coleman broke into the home of Dale and Delthea Warren in Muskogee County. While burglarizing the home, he was interrupted by 68-year-old John Seward and his wife, 62-year-old Roxie Seward. John Seward was the brother of Delthea Warren. Armed with a .28 gauge shotgun, Coleman took the Sewards hostage and led them into the home's basement at gunpoint. He then fatally shot each of the victims with the shotgun, killing John via a single gunshot wound to the back of the head and killing Roxie via four gunshot wounds inflicted from only a few inches away. Coleman then fled the home. The bodies of the Sewards were found later that day at around 4:15 p.m. in the basement of the Warren's home. Several items from the house were also determined to be missing, including watches, wallets, and packets of frozen meat.

At around 6:00 p.m., Coleman was stopped by police for a traffic violation. The pickup truck he was driving was searched, and several incriminating items were found. Roxie Seward's wallet was found on Coleman, and the stolen packets of frozen meat were found in his truck. A watch belonging to Delthea Warren was also discovered. In addition, it was determined that the shotgun used to carry out the murders was very rare, and Coleman was found to own one. Testimony also placed Coleman's pickup truck at the Warren's home at around the time the murders were committed. None of the evidence was refuted. Because of the overwhelming amount of evidence against him, Coleman was charged with first-degree murder in the deaths of John and Roxie Seward.

On April 23, 1979, while awaiting trial for the murder of the Sewards, Coleman escaped from the Muskogee County jail through its tarpaper roof. He broke into a home which he burglarized, and then stole the homeowners' car. The following day, Officer Tom Dotson pulled over Coleman for a speeding violation in Luther. An altercation followed, and Coleman slit Dotson's throat before stealing his revolver and forcing him into the backseat of his patrol car. Coleman left Dotson for dead and handcuffed him inside his locked patrol car. Two days later, Coleman carjacked Russell E. Lewis Jr. in Tulsa, and fatally shot him in the head with the revolver he had stolen from Dotson. He then dumped Lewis' body down an embankment near Tulsa Park. The body was found two days later.

On April 28, Coleman was pulled over in Tucson, Arizona by Pima County deputy Terry Parish for driving erratically. After the two exchanged words, Coleman took out his gun and kidnapped Parish. He stole Parish's gun, handcuffed him, and drove him out into the desert in his patrol car. Coleman prepared to execute him but changed his mind and left him locked in the car out in the desert. Law enforcement had watched the confrontation from a helicopter and were able to direct units to Coleman's location. Coleman was arrested by Arizona law enforcement and taken into custody. The revolver, however, that had been used to murder Lewis, was nowhere to be found. Authorities found the weapon in the desert near where Parish had been left for dead three months later.

== Trial ==
Following his capture, Coleman was held at the Pima County Jail under maximum security. Mike Turpen, a Muskogee County District Attorney, then began extradition proceedings to bring Coleman back to Oklahoma to face trial for the murder of the Seward's.

Coleman was to be tried in Muskogee County for the murder of John Seward, however, in July 1979, a Muskogee County judge granted a change of venue due to the level of publicity surrounding the case. As such, Coleman was tried in Tahlequah instead. Coleman's trial began on September 26, 1979, with a six-man, six-woman jury selected. The prosecution rested their case on September 29. On October 1, the jury found him guilty of first degree murder in the killing of John Seward. The following day, they recommended a death sentence. On October 12, Coleman was formally sentenced to death by District Judge Hardy Summers.

Turpen, who prosecuted Coleman, held evidence against him in the murder of Roxie Seward in reserve in case another trial was ever needed. Turpen chose not to try Coleman for the murder of Roxie Seward because he felt there was no point, as Coleman had already been sentenced to death for John Seward's murder, and another trial would cost time and money.

Coleman was also tried for the murder of Russell Lewis. He was found guilty, convicted, and sentenced to death again. However, in 1983, the sentence was overturned, following the discovery that a potential juror had been excluded from the trial after expressing doubts about the death penalty. The charge was not refiled.

== Execution ==
In 1987, Coleman was nearly executed, but won a stay of execution from the United States Court of Appeals for the Tenth Circuit. He was rescheduled for execution for September 10, 1990. In the month prior to his scheduled execution, his attorney asked the Oklahoma Pardon and Parole Board to recommend his sentence be commuted to life in prison. However, the board chairman denied Coleman a clemency hearing. A federal appeals court also denied him a stay of execution.

On September 10, 1990, Coleman was executed at the Oklahoma State Penitentiary via lethal injection. He was pronounced dead at 12:35 a.m. Coleman was the first person to be executed in Oklahoma by lethal injection. The lethal injection process consisted of three drugs; the first to be injected was sodium thiopental, followed by pancuronium bromide, and then potassium chloride. Coleman declined a last meal. His last words were, "Just tell everybody I love them. I have peace and a quiet heart." When a minister read from Matthew 7, Coleman said, "Praise God, praise God."

Coleman was the first person to be executed in Oklahoma in over twenty-four years, since the execution of James Donald French in 1966. Since the reinstatement of capital punishment in 1976, Coleman was the first person to be executed in Oklahoma, and the 138th in the United States.

== Daisy Doe ==
In May 1988, the body of a woman was found in the Grand Neosho River beneath Fort Gibson Dam in Cherokee County, Oklahoma. The woman had been murdered and had been attached to a concrete block that had been tied around her waist. Investigators were unable to identify her. Because a daisy tattoo was found on her shoulder, she was referred to as Daisy Doe. Her identity remained a mystery for nearly three decades until March 2015. The Oklahoma State Bureau of Investigation had prepared a presentation to cold case detectives in regards to the Daisy Doe case. They discovered that her hands had been preserved in cold storage when gathering evidence. New technology allowed the investigators to take fingerprints of Daisy Doe. The fingerprints matched those of a woman who had been arrested in connection with the 1979 murders of John and Roxie Seward. The woman had never been charged in the murders but was identified as Jeanette Ellen Coleman. Jeanette Coleman had been the wife of Charles Coleman and the daughter of Will Stidham, whom Coleman was suspected of murdering back in 1975.

The discovery led investigators to suspect Charles Coleman could have been involved in her murder. However, it was determined that Coleman had been in jail when Jeanette had been murdered, ruling him out as a suspect. Three men were believed to be responsible, whom investigators believed she had met at a Muskogee bar before engaging in sexual intercourse near the dam. She then had a concrete block tied to her and was thrown into the river while still alive. One of the suspects was charged with first-degree murder in 2017. A District Attorney said he believed the other two men had since died.

== In popular culture ==
Coleman is mentioned in the 2006 true crime nonfiction book, The Innocent Man: Murder and Injustice in a Small Town by John Grisham. The book tells the story of Ron Williamson, who was wrongly convicted and sentenced to death in 1988 in Oklahoma for rape and murder, who was later released when DNA evidence proved his innocence. According to the book, Williamson was not fond of Coleman, and many prisoners on death row at Oklahoma State Penitentiary were not too bothered about his execution, with some even celebrating the news.

== See also ==
- Capital punishment in Oklahoma
- Capital punishment in the United States
- List of people executed in Oklahoma
- List of people executed in the United States in 1990

Executions carried out in Oklahoma
Preceded by James French August 10, 1966	Charles Coleman; September 10, 1990	Succeeded by Robyn Parks March 10, 1992
Executions carried out in the United States
Preceded by George Gilmore – Missouri August 31, 1990	Charles Coleman – Oklahoma; September 10, 1990	Succeeded by Charles Walker – Illinois September 12, 1990
