= People v. Anderson =

Landmark case in the U.S. state of California

- Supreme Court of California

Argued February 18, 1972
- Full case name: The People of the State of California v. Robert Page Anderson
- Citation(s): 6 Cal. 3d 628; 493 P.2d 880; 100 Cal. Rptr. 152; 1972 Cal. LEXIS 154

Case history
- Prior history: Defendant convicted; judgment affirmed, 64 Cal.2d 633 [51 Cal.Rptr. 238, 414 P.2d 366]; sentence reversed and remanded, 69 Cal.2d 613 [73 Cal.Rptr. 21]
- Subsequent history: Certiorari denied, 406 U.S. 958

Holding
- The use of capital punishment in the state of California was deemed unconstitutional because it was considered cruel or unusual.

Court membership
- Chief Justice: Donald R. Wright
- Associate Justices: Mathew O. Tobriner, Stanley Mosk, Louis H. Burke, Raymond L. Sullivan, Raymond E. Peters, Marshall F. McComb

Case opinions
- Majority: Wright, joined by Peters, Tobriner, Mosk, Burke, Sullivan
- Dissent: McComb

Laws applied
- Cal. Penal Code §§ 4500, 1239(b); California Constitution Article I section 6
- Superseded by
- California Constitution Article I section 27 (California Proposition 17)

The People of the State of California v. Robert Page Anderson, 493 P.2d 880, 6 Cal. 3d 628 (Cal. 1972), was a landmark case in the state of California that outlawed capital punishment for nine months until the enactment of a constitutional amendment reinstating it, Proposition 17.

== Background ==
The case was an automatic appeal to the court under section 1239b of the California Penal Code, which provides that, following a death sentence, the case is automatically appealed to the State Supreme Court.

Robert Page Anderson was convicted of first-degree murder, attempted murder of three men, and first-degree robbery. On April 8, 1965, Anderson shot and killed Louis Richards during a pawn shop robbery in San Diego. The Supreme Court affirmed the judgment of the lower court in People v. Anderson 64 Cal.2d 633 [51 Cal.Rptr. 238, 414 P.2d 366] (1966), but it reversed its decision with respect to the sentence of the death penalty In re Anderson, 69 Cal.2d 613 (1968) following the landmark case Witherspoon v. Illinois (1968), which decided that it was illegal to remove a juror who simply disagreed with the death penalty unless the juror adamantly refused to follow the law under any circumstances.

The case was retried on the issue of the defendant's penalty, and the jury again returned a verdict of death.

== Decision ==
In the original case (1966), the court did not raise the issue as to whether capital punishment was unconstitutional. In the second hearing, which also took place in 1968, the court did raise the issue but decided that it was neither cruel nor unusual. However, in view of Witherspoon, the court found that the defendant's death sentence was unconstitutionally decided. In this third hearing, the court changed its mind and decided that capital punishment itself was cruel or unusual.

The court ruled that the use of capital punishment was considered impermissibly cruel or unusual as it degraded and dehumanized the parties involved. It held that the penalty is "unnecessary to any legitimate goal of the state and [is] incompatible with the dignity of man and the judicial process".

Furthermore, the court also cited the view of capital punishment in American society as one of the most important reasons for its acceptability, contending that a growing population and a decreasing number of executions was persuasive evidence that such a punishment was no longer condoned by the general public.

The case also turned on a difference in wording between the U.S. Constitution's 8th Amendment argument against cruel and unusual punishment and Article 1, Section 6 of the California Constitution (the provision has since moved to Article 1, Section 17), which read (emphasis added):

All persons shall be bailable by sufficient sureties, unless for capital offenses when the proof is evident or the presumption great. Excessive bail shall not be required, nor excessive fines imposed; nor shall cruel or unusual punishments be inflicted. Witnesses shall not be unreasonably detained, nor confined in any room where criminals are actually imprisoned.

Since the State Constitution prohibits a punishment which is either of the two conditions (as opposed to prohibiting ones that violate both conditions), the court found the penalty unconstitutional on state constitutional grounds since if it violated either provision it was unconstitutional at the state level. The court even went so far as to decline to even consider if the death penalty violates the Eighth Amendment to the United States Constitution since it had already found it to be in violation of the state constitution. The court decided it on April 24, 1972.

The state contended that while the use of capital punishment served no rehabilitating purposes, it was a legitimate punishment for retribution in serious offenses, in that it served to isolate the offender, and was a useful deterrent to crime. The court rejected the state's defense citing that there were far less onerous means of isolating the offender, and the lack of proof that capital punishment is an effective deterrent.

=== Dissent ===
Justice Marshall F. McComb wrote a brief dissent on the basis that the landmark case, Furman v. Georgia 408 U.S. 238 (1972) was currently on the docket of the Supreme Court of the United States and that the court should await its decision before ruling. (The U.S. Supreme Court later ruled in Furman that the death penalty—as then practiced in almost all of the states that used it—was unconstitutional.) As it turned out, the U.S. Supreme Court would set aside the question whether the death penalty was per se unconstitutional (later in Gregg v. Georgia it ruled that the death penalty was constitutional).

McComb also argued that the death penalty deterred crime, noting numerous Supreme Court precedents upholding the death penalty's constitutionality, and stating that the legislative and initiative processes were the only appropriate avenues to determine whether the death penalty should be allowed. McComb was so upset about the Anderson decision that he walked out of the courtroom.

== Aftermath ==
The Anderson decision caused all capital sentences in the state of California to be commuted to life in prison. Notably, it is because of this decision that Charles Manson avoided execution following his conviction and resulting death sentence for the "Tate-LaBianca" murders in 1969. Sirhan Sirhan also had his death sentence for the assassination of Robert Kennedy commuted to life in prison. It would also mean that if any person was ever charged with a murder committed in California before 1972, a death sentence could not be imposed. The United States Supreme Court in Aikens v. California, 406 U.S. 813 (1972) denied an appeal of a death sentence because:

[Anderson] declared capital punishment in California unconstitutional under Art. 1, 6, of the state constitution... The California Supreme Court declared in the Anderson case that its decision was fully retroactive and stated that any prisoner currently under sentence of death could petition a superior court to modify its judgment. [Aikens] thus no longer faces a realistic threat of execution... [emphasis added]

Later in 1972, the people of California amended the state constitution by initiative process, superseding the court ruling and reinstating the death penalty. Rather than simply switch to the federal "cruel and unusual" standard, the amendment, called Proposition 17, kept the "cruel or unusual" standard, but followed it with a clause expressly declaring capital punishment to be neither cruel nor unusual.

Due to the U.S. Supreme Court decision in Furman later the same year declaring most capital statutes (including the one in California, but excluding others like the one in Rhode Island) in the U.S. to be unconstitutional, plus extensive appellate and habeas corpus litigation in capital cases, no death sentences were carried out in the state until 1992. That year, Robert Alton Harris was executed in the gas chamber.

In a 1978 concurring opinion, Justice Mosk expressed his dismay at the response of the California electorate to Anderson:

The people of California responded quickly and emphatically, both directly and through their elected representatives, to callously declare that whatever the trends elsewhere in the nation and the world, society in our state does not deem the retributive extinction of a human life to be either cruel or unusual. [Citations.] "Cruelty" is not definable with precision. It is in the eye of the beholder: what may be perceived as cruelty by one person is seen as justice by another. Thus, this court, in ascertaining the permissible limits of punishment, must look in the first instance to those values to which the people of our state subscribe. That as one individual I prefer values more lofty than those implicit in the macabre process of deliberately exterminating a human being does not permit me to interpret in my image the common values of the people of our state.

Anderson's sentence was later commuted, and, in 1976, he was paroled and moved to Seattle. After moving to Seattle, he earned a degree from a community college and worked as a teacher-trainee at day-care centers. He counseled teenagers at the Seattle juvenile hall to abandon their drug habits. Don Crews, who was Anderson’s supervisor, said he was impressed by how Anderson spoke out about the harshness of death row, and showed young offenders how almost any life was worth saving. He died in Seattle in 1999 at the age of 62.

In 1990, Anderson was interviewed about the upcoming execution of Robert Alton Harris, who would become the person to be executed in California since capital punishment was reinstated. Despite also being a convicted murderer who himself had once been on death row, he thought Harris, who had kidnapped, robbed, and murdered two 16-year-old boys, deserved to die. While aware of the irony of this belief, Anderson said he thought he didn't deserve to die for a murder that he claimed was committed on the spur of the moment, and that Harris's crimes were far worse in comparison.

"He was way out of line. He could have let those kids go. So I have no pity or compassion for somebody like that. I can't, in good conscience, be in his corner. I can't. And if those kids' parents sit there in the front row and clap when he dies, I still couldn’t sympathize with Robert Harris. I don't want him to live. I want him to die because he killed children."

== Documentation ==
The incident was documented in The Hub Shootout: San Diego's Unbelievable Four-hour Firefight, which revisits the events and sequelae of San Diego's longest (at the time, four hours) armed siege/shootout at the Hub Loans & Jewelry Company. A newspaper editor died of a heart attack. Over a thousand rounds were exchanged between the shooter and a SWAT team. The "murder case would eventually make California judicial history and keep Charles Manson and Sirhan Sirhan from the gas chamber."

== See also ==
- Capital punishment in California
