= Aaron Mitchell (murderer) =

American murderer executed in California (1930–1967)

Aaron C. Mitchell
- Born: 1930; Alabama, U.S.
- Died: April 12, 1967 (aged 37); San Quentin State Prison, California, U.S.
- Status: Executed by gas chamber
- Motive: To avoid arrest
- Convictions: First degree murder Assault with intent to commit robbery Robbery; Auto theft (2 counts); Escape
- Penalty: Death

Details
- Victims: Arnold Gamble, 42
- Date: February 15, 1963

Aaron C. Mitchell (d. April 12, 1967) was a murderer, convicted of the February 15, 1963, killing of Sacramento police officer Arnold Gamble, who was responding to a robbery committed by Mitchell. He was sentenced to death, and was executed in the gas chamber. Mitchell, who was from Alabama, had a lengthy criminal record that spanned 20 years. Mitchell was the last inmate to be executed involuntarily before the U.S. Supreme Court's ruling in Furman v. Georgia in 1972, which invalided all existing death penalty statutes at the time.

== Prior crimes ==
During his murder trial, Mitchell testified that in 1947, at the age of 17, he was arrested for stealing a car in Missouri. He was sentenced to two years in prison for this crime and served 14 months. Upon his release, he committed another car theft in Tennessee, for which he was sentenced in October 1948 to three years on a chain gang. He escaped after 10 days, but was rearrested on other charges in Chicago in 1951 and returned to Tennessee. He served a total of 31 months, including six months for the escape, and was released in the summer of 1954. In September 1954, Mitchell held two employees of a country club near Denver, Colorado, then pistol-whipped the manager. He pleaded guilty to assault with intent to commit a robbery and was sent to the Colorado State Prison. While on parole in April 1959, Mitchell was stopped by police officers, who discovered a stocking mask hanging on a metal hinge of the convertible top of the car he was driving, a loaded revolver behind the visor on the driver's side, and an unloaded gun on the passenger's side. His parole was revoked and he was returned to prison. He was released from prison in 1961.

== Murder ==
At 10:30pm on February 15, 1963, Mitchell robbed the Stadium Club, a bar and restaurant in Sacramento. He entered wearing a hood, and fired a shotgun into the ceiling to let those present know that it was loaded. While the cash register was being emptied, a member of staff called the police, and four officers attended. Mitchell used Officer Shaw as a human shield and took his revolver, and in the ensuing exchange of fire Shaw was shot in the leg, Mitchell was shot, and Officer Gamble was shot point blank in the chest with Shaw's revolver and killed. Mitchell fled on foot, firing one shot with the shotgun as he went, but the shotgun exploded owing to its dirty condition, and Mitchell was arrested two blocks away.

== Trial and appeals ==
At his trial, Mitchell pleaded guilty to robbery and denied murder. Eyewitnesses testified that he had shot and killed Officer Gamble. Mitchell testified that he had tried to surrender when the police arrived and that he could not remember what had happened next. The jury found him guilty of first-degree murder and sentenced him to death.

On appeal, his conviction was upheld, but the sentence was overturned on the ground that the judge had misdirected the jury by telling them that they could consider that it is possible for a defendant to be pardoned or paroled. The case was remanded for a retrial of the penalty phase, and the jury again sentenced him to death. On his second appeal, the sentence was upheld.

== Execution ==
Mitchell was the last person to be executed in California before the Supreme Court of California ruled in 1972 that capital punishment was unconstitutional (the Supreme Court of the United States made a similar ruling later that year). He was the 194th person to be executed by gassing in California (1937–67), and the only person to be executed in that state during the term of Governor Ronald Reagan (1967–1975). Both Reagan and his predecessor had declined clemency. Mitchell's case had been heard twice by the US Supreme Court and twice by the California Supreme Court.

Prior to his execution, he was visited by renowned psychiatrist, Holocaust survivor, and author of Man's Search for Meaning, Dr. Viktor Frankl in lieu of last rites. Shortly thereafter, Mitchell held an unorthodox press conference during which he declared in a typewritten statement that "I have made my appeal to God and to the Governor. This is my last appeal to Man. Forgive me, for I knew not." The San Francisco Chronicle documented him saying "I don't really expect clemency from the Governor and I sympathize with him. He will be under criticism either way, but under much lighter criticism if he fails to act for me." He also feared that his own execution may spur "a long new line to the gas chamber."

When the time of his execution came, Mitchell fought with the guards and had to be dragged to the execution chamber. His last words were "I am Jesus Christ!" He was 37.

There were no further executions in California until 1992, when Robert Alton Harris was gassed. The gas chamber was ruled unconstitutional in California in 1996.

== See also ==
- Capital punishment in California
- List of people executed in the United States, 1965–1972

Executions carried out in California
Preceded by James Bentley January 23, 1963	Aaron Mitchell; April 12, 1967	Succeeded by Robert Alton Harris April 21, 1992
Executions carried out in the United States
Preceded by James French – Oklahoma August 10, 1966	Aaron Mitchell – California; April 12, 1967	Succeeded by Luis Monge – Colorado June 2, 1967
