= 1972 California Proposition 17 =

Referendum reinstating the death penalty

Proposition 17 of 1972 was a measure enacted by California voters to reintroduce the death penalty in that state. The California Supreme Court had ruled on February 17, 1972, that capital punishment was contrary to the state constitution. Proposition 17 amended the Constitution of California in order to overturn that decision. It was submitted to a referendum by means of the initiative process, and approved by voters on November 7 with 67.5% of the vote.

== Background ==
=== People v. Anderson ===
The court ruled in People v. Anderson that capital punishment was contrary to Article 1, Section 6 of the state constitution, which forbade "cruel or unusual punishment", and was held to be more strict than the similarly worded provision of the Eighth Amendment of the U.S. Constitution that says "cruel and unusual punishment". Proposition 17 amended the state constitution by adding Article 1, Section 27, which reads:

All statutes of this state in effect on February 17, 1972, requiring, authorizing, imposing, or relating to the death penalty are in full force and effect, subject to legislative amendment or repeal by statute, initiative, or referendum. The death penalty provided for under those statutes shall not be deemed to be, or to constitute, the infliction of cruel or unusual punishments within the meaning of Article I, Section 6 nor shall such punishment for such offenses be deemed to contravene any other provision of this constitution.

=== People v. Frierson ===
In 1979, it was argued before the California Supreme Court (in People v. Frierson) that Proposition 17 was unconstitutional, as it amounted to a "revision" rather than an "amendment" of the state constitution, and a revision may not be enacted by an initiative. The court rejected this argument. Justice Stanley Mosk filed a concurring opinion in which he reluctantly agreed with the judgment of the court, but also expressed his dismay at the response of the electorate to Anderson:

The people of California responded quickly and emphatically, both directly and through their elected representatives, to callously declare that whatever the trends elsewhere in the nation and the world, society in our state does not deem the retributive extinction of a human life to be either cruel or unusual.

== Aftermath ==
Despite Proposition 17, no executions were carried out in California until 1992. This was due to the U.S. Supreme Court decision in the same year in Furman v. Georgia (which temporarily halted capital punishment in the United States) and to extensive litigation that occurred thereafter.

== See also ==
- Capital punishment in California
- 2012 California Proposition 34
- 2016 California Proposition 66
- 2016 California Proposition 62
- People v. Anderson
- Strauss v. Horton
- Twenty-first Amendment of the Constitution of Ireland
