= Kevin Cooper (prisoner) =

American death row inmate (born 1958)

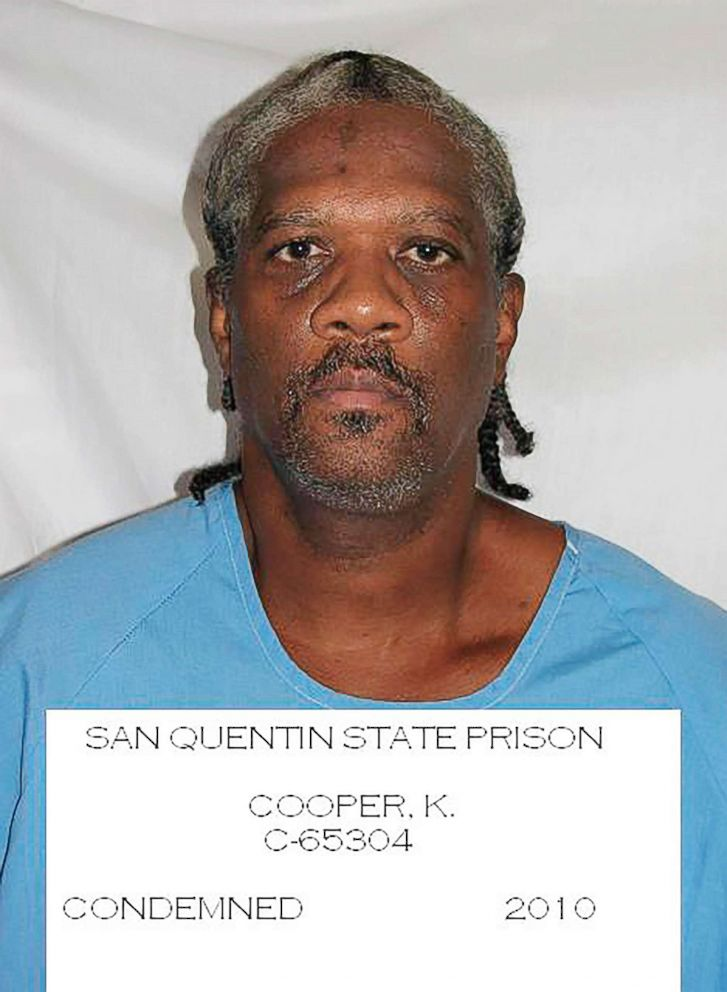
- Mugshot of Kevin Cooper in 2010
- Born: Richard Goodman; January 8, 1958 (age 68); Pittsburgh, Pennsylvania, U.S.
- Status: Incarcerated on death row
- Convictions: First-degree murder (4 counts), attempted murder
- Penalty: Death (de jure)
- Website: kevincooper.org

Kevin Cooper (born Richard Goodman; January 8, 1958) is an American convicted mass murderer sentenced to death, for the murders of three members of the Ryen family and their house guest, in the Chino Hills area of California in 1983. It would become known as the “Chino Hills massacre”.

Before the Chino Hills massacre, Kevin Cooper was accused of kidnapping and raping a 17-year-old girl in Pennsylvania after she interrupted him during a burglary. He was never tried or convicted on those allegations because he fled to California after escaping from custody.

Kevin Cooper escaped from the California Institution for Men two days before the murders and was believed to have hidden in a vacant house next door to the Ryen residence.

Cooper’s DNA was identified on cigarette butts recovered from the vacant house where investigators believed he had been staying. DNA testing identified blood on a T-shirt found along a roadside as Kevin Cooper’s. Prosecutors argued the shirt was connected to the murders and had been discarded while he fled. Cooper was later arrested after driving a station wagon that had been stolen from the Ryen family following the murders. Additional physical evidence, including shoe impressions and other forensic evidence presented at trial, was used by prosecutors to argue that Cooper was the perpetrator.

Cooper has continued to maintain his innocence and has repeatedly sought additional DNA testing in attempts to overturn his conviction. Subsequent testing has not exonerated him, and his conviction has remained in place through numerous appeals.

== Early life ==
Cooper was born Richard Goodman on January 8, 1958, near Pittsburgh, Pennsylvania. When he was two months old, his mother placed him in an orphanage. At the age of six months, he was adopted by Melvin and Esther Cooper, who renamed him Kevin Cooper. As a child, Kevin Cooper was subjected to physical abuse and ran away from home numerous times. As an adolescent, he was sent to juvenile custody numerous times.

== Previous criminal record ==
Cooper's criminal past included theft and burglary. He was sentenced to a one-to-two-year prison term in 1977 for burglarizing a home in Pittsburgh, Pennsylvania. Cooper was involved in kidnapping and raping a minor female who interrupted him during a burglary in Pennsylvania. Cooper agreed to the stipulation on the advice of his lawyer who mistakenly believed this admission would help Cooper avoid the death penalty in the Chino Hills case. During the purported crime, he threatened to kill the teen-age victim. Cooper's thumb print was left on the open dining room window of the high school teen victim's house, and his palm print was left on her car that he stole.

Over the next five years, he was convicted and sentenced to jail twice for burglaries and was released on probation in 1982. He escaped from custodial settings in Pennsylvania 11 times.

In late 1982, Cooper fled to California after escaping from a Pennsylvania psychiatric facility. In California, Cooper was soon convicted of two burglaries in the Los Angeles area. He began serving a four-year sentence under the alias David Trautman at the California Institution for Men (CIM) in Chino on April 29, 1983, where he was assigned to the minimum security section. On June 2, 1983, Cooper climbed through a hole in the prison fence and walked away from the prison across an open field.

== Chino Hills massacre and arrest ==
On the morning of June 5, 1983, Bill Hughes arrived at a semi-rural home in Chino Hills, California, where his 11-year-old son Christopher had spent the night. Inside, he found Douglas and Peggy Ryen, their 10-year-old daughter Jessica and his own son dead. They had been chopped with a hatchet, sliced with a knife, and stabbed with an ice-pick. Josh Ryen, the 8-year-old son of Douglas and Peggy, had survived. His throat had been cut. Peggy Ryen's purse was in plain sight on the kitchen counter, but no money had been taken. The family station wagon was gone; it was discovered several days later in Long Beach, California, about 50 miles southwest of Chino Hills.

The San Bernardino County Sheriff's Department deputies who responded to the call identified Kevin Cooper as the likely killer. He had admittedly hidden out in the vacant house next door, the Lease house, 125 yards away, for two days. He had made repeated calls from this house to two female friends asking for money to help with his escape, but they had refused. Cooper testified at trial that he had left that house as soon as it got dark on June 4 and had hitchhiked to Mexico. It was established that Cooper checked into a hotel in Tijuana, about 130 miles south of Chino Hills, at 4:30 pm on June 5.

There, Cooper befriended an American couple who owned a sailboat. He hitched a ride on the boat with them as a crew member cruising the Baja and Southern California coasts.

Seven weeks later, while still staying on the couple's boat, Cooper was accused of raping a woman at knifepoint on a boat docked nearby. While visiting the sheriff's office to report the crime, the rape victim saw a wanted poster with Cooper's photograph and identified him as the rapist. Deputies and coast guard personnel detained him as he tried to swim ashore. The Santa Barbara District Attorney's Office eventually charged Cooper with rape, sodomy and grand theft of a dinghy used in his escape. These charges were dropped when he was convicted and sentenced to death.

== Trial ==
On Cooper's motion, the court changed the venue of the trial from San Bernardino County to San Diego County. Cooper pleaded guilty to the charge of escape from prison.

In videotaped testimony, Josh Ryen said that the evening before the murders, just before the family left for the Blade barbecue, three Mexican men came to the Ryen home looking for work. Ryen did not identify the killer, but said in an audiotape with his treating psychiatrist that he saw the back of a single man attacking his mother. Ryen told a sheriff he thought three men had done it because "I thought it was them. And, you know, like they stopped up that night," but he did not actually see three people during the incident.

Cooper testified in his own defense. He admitted escaping from CIM, hiding out and sleeping at the Lease house, but denied committing the murders or being in the Ryen house. Cooper said he left the Lease house on foot, hitchhiked, stole a purse, and eventually made his way to Mexico. The defense pointed out the inconsistencies in Ryen's testimony, presented evidence of other events apparently not involving Cooper that might have had something to do with the killings, and presented an expert witness that criticized the forensic investigation.

A jury convicted Cooper of four counts of first degree murder and one count of attempted murder with the intentional infliction of great bodily injury, and then imposed the death penalty.

During the penalty phase of Cooper's trial, a stipulation was entered that “Kevin Cooper was the man who abducted (the female minor) on October 8th of 1982 from the Heath residence, kidnapped her, and later raped her in Frock Park." Cooper agreed to the stipulation on the advice of his lawyer who mistakenly believed this admission would help Cooper avoid the death penalty in this case.

== Assessment by courts, governors and independent groups ==
=== California Supreme Court ===
The Supreme Court of California upheld Cooper's conviction in May 1991.

Cooper was scheduled to be executed on February 10, 2004, but on February 8, 2004, a three judge panel consisting of Judges Pamela Rymer, Ronald Gould and James Browning heard Cooper's petition and rejected it by a vote of 2–1.

Judge Browning, the lone dissenter, was able to assemble enough judges to get an en banc ruling blocking the execution to allow further DNA testing. Ultimately, the US Supreme Court unanimously upheld the stay, effectively making it impossible to carry out the death warrant.

The postponement followed a campaign by various groups in the Bay Area and around the country, such as the Campaign to End the Death Penalty, the ACLU, Death Penalty Focus and The Mobilization to Free Mumia Abu-Jamal.

=== Denial of clemency by California Governor Schwarzenegger ===
On January 30, 2004, the office of Governor of California Arnold Schwarzenegger issued the following statement regarding his decision not to grant clemency to Kevin Cooper:

I have carefully weighed the claims presented in Kevin Cooper's plea for clemency. The state and federal courts have reviewed this case for more than 18 years. Evidence establishing his guilt is overwhelming, and his conversion to faith and his mentoring of others, while commendable, do not diminish the cruelty and destruction he has inflicted on so many. His is not a case for clemency.

On December 17, 2010, Cooper filed a second clemency petition to Governor Schwarzenegger. This petition laid out new developments in the evidence that were not known when the first one was denied in 2004. The second clemency petition also cited the conclusions and observations of twelve appellate judges of the Ninth Circuit Court of Appeals, including the fact that blood taken from Cooper after he was arrested was contaminated with the DNA of another person, that a sheriff's deputy had lied at Cooper's trial about destruction of key evidence, and that three witnesses, never interviewed by the prosecution, had come forward with strong evidence of other possible perpetrators.

Just before Governor Schwarzenegger left office in January 2011, his office wrote a letter to Cooper's lawyer stating that the application "raises many evidentiary concerns which deserve a thorough and careful review of voluminous records." The letter further stated that since the Governor had only two weeks left in office, he had decided to leave the matter for Governor-elect Jerry Brown's determination.

During Kamala Harris’s tenure as California Attorney General (2011–2017), Cooper's legal team submitted multiple requests for advanced DNA testing of key evidence in the case. Harris’s office declined these requests, citing procedural grounds. Critics argued that this decision prioritized legal formalities over potentially exculpatory testing. The issue became a focal point of controversy in later years, as Harris faced scrutiny for not approving testing while she had the authority to do so.

=== U.S. Ninth Circuit Court and U.S Supreme Court deny appeals ===
Cooper has filed multiple appeals and applications for a writ of habeas corpus, all of which have been denied. On December 4, 2007, the Ninth Circuit Court of Appeals denied Cooper's third federal petition for a writ of habeas corpus. The panel concluded: "As the district court, and all state courts, have repeatedly found, evidence of Cooper's guilt was overwhelming. The tests that he asked for to show his innocence 'once and for all' show nothing of the sort." While Judge McKeown concurred, she expressed doubts about the certainty of Cooper's guilt, saying that critical evidence had been lost due to mishandling by the investigators.

On May 11, 2009, the Ninth Circuit denied Cooper's request for a rehearing en banc of the 2007 panel decision. Four judges (Fletcher, Wardlaw, Fisher, and Reinhardt) filed dissents, indicating that they disagreed with the decision. Judge Fletcher stated that there was a strong likelihood that the police tampered with the evidence and accused Judge Huff of both deliberately ignoring the Court's instructions to perform proper testing and intentionally rigging the testing in favor of the state, while Judge Wardlaw stated "as far as due process is concerned 25 years of flawed proceedings are as good as no proceedings at all." Eleven judges joined the dissents (fourteen votes were required to grant the request for a rehearing), though Judge Stephen Reinhardt hinted that the gap may have been closer. Judge Rymer, who authored the original panel decision, filed a concurrence defending both the original decision and the decision to deny an en banc hearing, arguing that Fletcher should have deferred to the AEDPA rather than questioning the integrity of the state's expert.

Cooper's petition for certiorari to the United States Supreme Court was denied on November 30, 2009.

=== Inter-American Commission on Human Rights recommends a review ===
In April 2011 Cooper filed a petition with the Inter-American Commission on Human Rights (IACHR) alleging that his human rights had been violated in multiple respects by his prosecution, conviction and death sentence. The IACHR concluded that the United States had violated Articles I, II, XVIII and XXVI of the American Declaration of the Rights and Duties of Man. The Commission found eight instances where Cooper's due process rights had been violated, that Cooper had received ineffective assistance of trial counsel, and that there were serious questions about racial discrimination in Cooper's prosecution. The IACHR recommended that Cooper be granted "effective relief, including the review of his trial and sentence."

=== American Bar Association recommendation for clemency ===
On Saturday, March 19, 2016, the president of the American Bar Association (ABA), Paulette Brown, submitted a letter to Governor of California Jerry Brown, suggesting that Cooper be granted clemency due to claims of racial bias, police misconduct, evidence tampering and poor-quality defense counsel. "We recommend that this investigation include testing of forensic evidence still available to be analyzed to put to rest the questions that continue to plague his death sentence. This is the only course of action that can ensure that Mr. Cooper receives due process and the protection of his rights under the Constitution."

=== New DNA testing order by California Governor Brown ===
In May 2018, Nicholas Kristof wrote an article in The New York Times highlighting the case, arguing that the truth could be determined by doing advanced testing on the bloodstained t-shirt, the hatchet handle and the hand towel used by the murderer and including diagrams showing both that Lee Furrow's stepmother lived close to where the victim's car was recovered and that Officer Steven Moran most likely planted evidence to frame Cooper. Soon afterward, U.S. Senators Kamala Harris—who had previously served as California Attorney General—and Dianne Feinstein both publicly called for advanced DNA testing. Harris’s reversal came after public outcry sparked by Kristof’s article, which sharply criticized her earlier refusal to allow such testing during her time in office. In response, DA Michael Ramos submitted a response to Cooper's petition, calling for the petition to be refused. Ramos would also file to have Cooper executed following his failed attempt to be re-elected.

On July 3, 2018, California Governor Jerry Brown hinted that he might be willing to approve DNA testing, sending Cooper's attorneys a list of questions. On August 17, the defense submitted their response, revealing that they had managed to acquire Lee Furrow's DNA for testing. On October 6, Nick Kristof wrote a follow-up in which he reported that Lee Furrow had told him that he was now open for testing to "clear his name."

In December 2018, outgoing Gov. Brown ordered new DNA testing in the Cooper case. The testing has since been revealed; insufficient DNA was recovered from the shirt but a profile that was neither Cooper or Furrow was recovered from a hand towel taken from the victim's house. While Vial VV-2 only had Cooper's profile, it was also found drained of blood except for residue at the bottom, which was described as "unusual" by DNA experts Bicka Barlow and Marc Taylor (both of whom stated that testing in 1983 was such that only a small amount of the blood would have been used.)

=== Independent investigation order by California Governor Newsom ===
On May 28, 2021, governor Gavin Newsom signed an executive order appointing the law firm Morrison & Foerster to "launch an independent investigation of death row inmate Kevin Cooper’s case as part of the evaluation of Cooper’s application for clemency. The investigation would review trial and appellate records in the case, the facts underlying the conviction and all available evidence, including the results of the recently conducted DNA tests previously ordered by the Governor to examine additional evidence in the case using the latest, most scientifically reliable forensic testing." The investigation would ultimately reject Cooper's claim, but acknowledged that it had not fully evaluated claims of prosecutorial and law enforcement misconduct "except in instances in which they determined that they were relevant to Cooper's claim of innocence." The investigation also acknowledged that it had not evaluated claims that Cooper's trial and the verdict had been influenced by racial prejudice, and also failed to examine previously undisclosed documents. Cooper's attorneys responded the following day, arguing that the investigation was "demonstrably incomplete" and that the investigators had "failed to follow the basic steps taken by all innocence investigations that have led to so many exonerations of the wrongfully convicted."

Cooper's attorneys would release another response to the Special Counsel on October 26, 2023, claiming that the investigation had been fatally compromised by only reviewing prosecution documents that had been presented at trial despite Morrison Foerster having earlier requested all documents in the prosecution's possession. They also argued that Alan Keel (the DNA expert used by Morrison Foerster to assess the evidence) was unreliable due to having both professional and personal ties with Daniel Gregonis (who the defense alleged had planted Cooper's blood) and Ed Blake (who had been involved in the 2002 DNA testing and rejected the idea that tampering had occurred), alleged misconduct in the Jane Dorotik case (Dorotik was exonerated in 2022 and would later sue both Keel and Blake in June 2023) and Anthony Melendez case (Keel and Blake refused to return evidence on the grounds it was their work product even when other scientists like Jill Spriggs and John Collins called the claim "indefensible"), and perceived scientific errors Keel made in his assessment (Keel tried to guess a sample's age based on how degraded it was even though the rate of degradation depends on environmental factors like heat, light and moisture, claimed that EDTA would automatically stop any degradation in blood when in fact light heat and moisture can cause EDTA preserved blood to degrade, and said that the presence of red tape on the reference vial cap proved it wasn't open even though the top of the vial, which was designed to be breached and reseal afterwards, was not covered by the tape).

On December 14, 2023, ABA President Mary Smith would write a letter to the Governor urging further investigation, arguing that the special counsel's failure to examine the undisclosed documents in the state's possession made it impossible to have confidence in the accuracy of the verdict.

== Incarceration ==
Cooper spent 39 years at San Quentin State Prison, a California Level IV designation, the highest level of maximum security. The death chamber at San Quentin was later dismantled, so in 2023 transfers of death row inmates began and Cooper was given a choice of four prisons. Due to various health issues he chose California Health Care Facility in Stockton, a Level II facility with open dormitories and a secure perimeter, where he has resided since May 23, 2024.

On November 5, 2026, Gavin Newsom granted and requested clemency for all California’s death row inmates to life imprisonment without parole. Due to Cooper's prior felony convictions, his case requires a pending review from the California Supreme Court before clemency can be granted to him.

== See also ==
- Capital punishment in California
- List of death row inmates in the United States
