= Robert Alton Harris =

American murderer (1953–1992)

- Harris in 1990
- Born: January 15, 1953; Fort Bragg, North Carolina, U.S.
- Died: April 21, 1992 (aged 39); San Quentin State Prison, California, U.S.
- Status: Executed by gas chamber
- Convictions: Federal; Bank robbery California; First degree murder with special circumstances (2 counts); Voluntary manslaughter Kidnapping (2 counts); Robbery (2 counts); Receiving stolen property
- Penalty: Federal; 25 years imprisonment California; Death (March 6, 1979)

Details
- Victims: 3
- Span of crimes: 1975–1978
- Country: United States
- State: California

Robert Alton Harris (January 15, 1953 – April 21, 1992) was an American car thief, burglar, kidnapper, and murderer executed at San Quentin State Prison in 1992 for the 1978 murders of two teenage boys in San Diego. His execution was the first in the state of California since 1967.

Harris was born in Fort Bragg, North Carolina, and was abused as a child. He had run-ins with police as early as age 10, and was first placed into juvenile detention at age 13 for stealing a car. His mother abandoned him at age 14 and he was soon after placed into juvenile detention after stealing another car. Following his release he found work, married, and had a son. In 1975, he was imprisoned for manslaughter and paroled in January 1978.

On July 5, 1978, Harris and his younger brother commandeered a car occupied by two 16-year-old boys, John Mayeski and Michael Baker, ordered them to drive to a remote area, then killed them. The brothers then used the car as their getaway car when they robbed a bank in San Diego. He was arrested less than an hour after the robbery and charged with murder, auto theft, kidnapping, burglary, and bank robbery. One of the arresting officers, Steve Baker, was the father of one of the murdered boys, but did not realize the victim was his son until later. Harris was convicted and sentenced to death on March 6, 1979. After a series of appeals and stays of execution, he was executed in San Quentin's gas chamber on April 21, 1992.

== Early life and criminal record/history ==
Robert Alton Harris was born at Fort Bragg in North Carolina, the fifth of nine children of Kenneth and Evelyn Harris, the latter of whom was half-Cherokee. Kenneth was a sergeant in the United States Army who was awarded a Silver Star and Purple Heart for his service in World War II. Both parents were alcoholics and physically abusive towards their children and each other; Robert was reportedly born two months premature as a result of Kenneth kicking Evelyn in the abdomen and had fetal alcohol syndrome. Robert, who was prone to daydreaming and talking with imaginary friends as a child, was especially targeted for physical abuse by his father, who believed that Robert was conceived in an affair. In one such instance, when Robert was 18 months old, his father beat him with a bamboo cane before threatening him with a gun.

Following Kenneth Harris' discharge from the military in October 1962, the family moved to a farm labor camp in California's San Joaquin Valley, frequently moving around the area as migrant workers. In December of the same year, Robert's eldest sister Barbara told authorities at juvenile hall, where she was detained on theft charges, that their father was sexually abusing her and her sisters. For this, Kenneth Harris was sentenced to 18 months imprisonment in January 1963, followed by registration as a sex offender.

Shortly after his father was taken to jail, Robert, aged 10, first came into contact with law enforcement after he was suspected of killing cats. In December 1964, Kenneth was again imprisoned after police caught him raping one of his daughters during a domestic call. Robert began misusing glue as an inhalant drug in his pre-teens, leading to an arrest in Modesto at age 12. At age 13, Robert spent four months in juvenile hall in Santa Rosa for car theft. During his time at the juvenile detention centre, Harris was repeatedly raped.

By May 1967, Harris was living in an apartment in Sacramento with his mother, her boyfriend, and four younger siblings. The same year, his mother relocated the family without her son's knowledge, effectively abandoning him at age 14. He subsequently moved to Oklahoma, where he lived with his older sister Barbara and his younger brother Daniel. His sister arranged for Harris to continue schooling in the eighth grade, but he was expelled shortly after enrollment. In 1968, Harris had an argument with his brother after the latter tried to stop his drug use, after which Harris ran away from home and stole a car; he was arrested in Florida. In Florida, he was designated a ward of the state, spending the next four years at various reformatories. During this time, Harris was recorded for numerous suicide attempts and diagnosed with schizophrenia.

After Harris reached his 19th birthday, he was released from juvenile custody, after which he travelled to Chula Vista, California, to live with his father. In June 1973, Harris married, and the couple had a son, Robert Jr., born in October 1974. By 1975, he had lost his job as a welder, become an alcoholic and taken residence at a trailer park in Imperial County.

=== Manslaughter ===
In 1975, Harris killed his neighbor James Wheeler, who lived with his brother Kenneth and his wife in the same trailer park. Both brothers were drunk at the time of the killing, and Harris later claimed that they wanted to give Wheeler "a lesson in how to fight". Over the course of six hours, the brothers repeatedly beat Wheeler, with Robert Harris additionally dousing Wheeler in flammable liquid, threatening to burn him with matches, and shearing his head. Harris admitted to killing Wheeler after the latter threatened his own wife. Later, however, Harris claimed that his brother Kenneth was responsible for Wheeler's death and that he had lied to cover for Kenneth. Wheeler's wife and niece testified in court that Robert Harris had killed Wheeler and that the attack was unprovoked. The same year, he was convicted of voluntary manslaughter and imprisoned in San Luis Obispo; during his imprisonment Harris' wife filed for divorce. Harris was paroled in January 1978.

== San Diego murders ==
Sometime in May or June 1978, Robert, then aged 25, asked his brother Daniel, 18, for help in planning a bank robbery. On July 2, Daniel stole two guns from a neighbor's house in Visalia, California, and the two drove to San Diego that night. They spent the next two days purchasing ammunition and practicing the robbery in a rural area near Miramar Lake.

On July 5, the Harris brothers happened upon John Mayeski and Michael Baker, both 16, sitting in a green Ford LTD eating cheeseburgers in a supermarket parking lot in Mira Mesa. Mayeski and Baker were best friends who had planned to spend the day fishing to celebrate Mayeski's newly acquired driver's license. Robert Harris commandeered Mayeski's car and ordered him to drive to Miramar Lake, with Daniel Harris following in another vehicle. Robert Harris told the boys that they would be using the vehicle to rob a bank, but that no one would be hurt. At Miramar Lake, the Harris brothers ordered the boys to kneel, whereupon the boys began to pray. Robert told the boys to "Quit crying, and die like men", then shot both boys multiple times. The Harris brothers then returned to Robert's Mira Mesa home and allegedly finished the victims' half-eaten cheeseburgers while Robert boasted about the killings.

About an hour later, the Harris brothers robbed the Mira Mesa branch of the San Diego Trust and Savings Bank located across the street from where they had abducted Mayeski and Baker, and fled with about $2,000. A witness to the robbery followed the Harris brothers to their home and notified police. The Harris brothers were arrested less than an hour after the robbery. One of the officers who apprehended the Harris brothers was Steven Baker, father of victim Michael Baker, who at the time was unaware that his son had been killed, let alone by those he was arresting.

== Conviction and execution ==
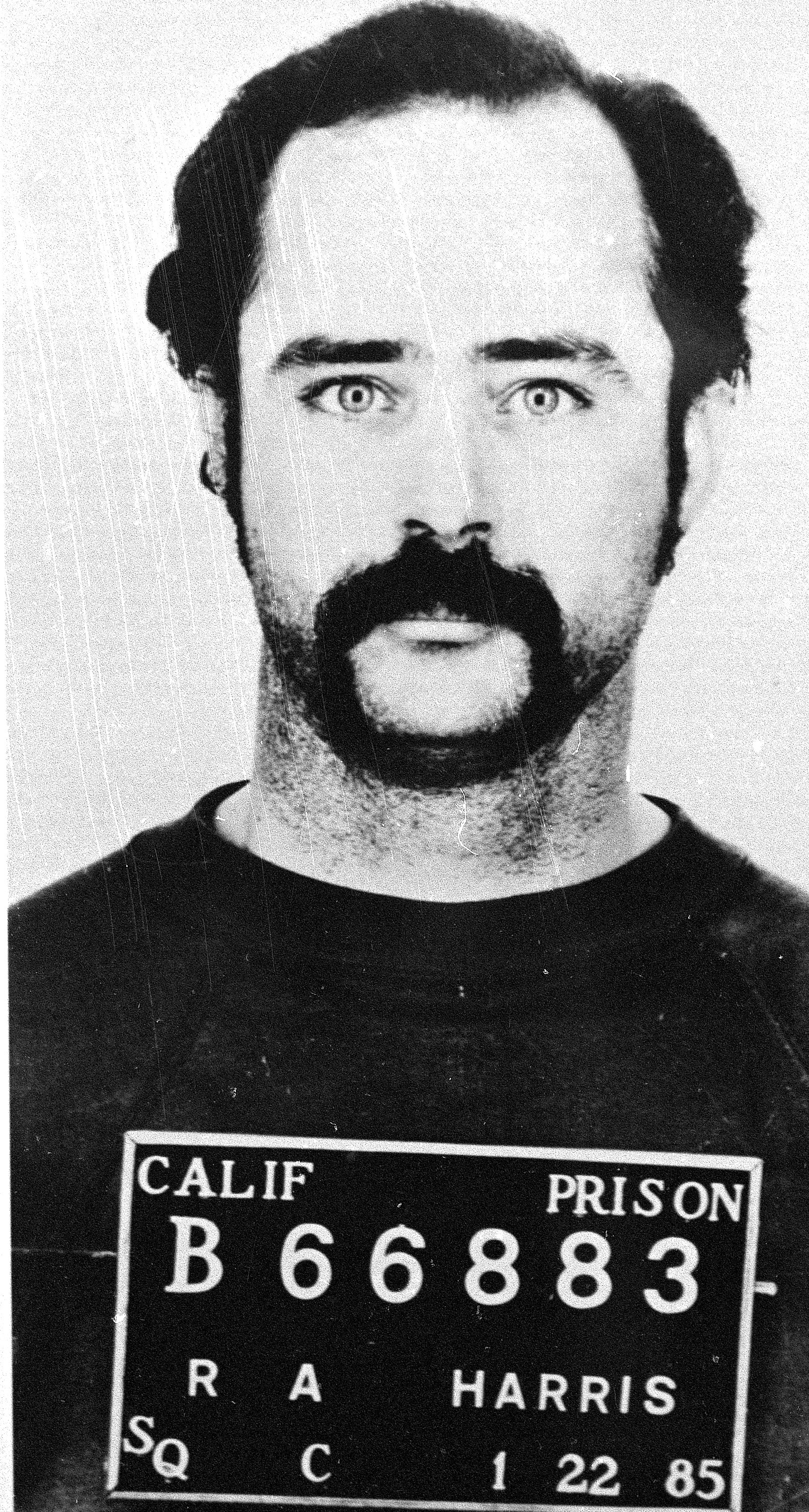
Robert Alton Harris in 1985

The San Diego County District Attorney's Office filed felony charges of auto theft, kidnapping, murder and burglary against Robert Harris, while the U.S. Attorney's Office filed bank robbery charges against him. Harris pleaded guilty to a federal charge of bank robbery and received a 25-year sentence.

On March 6, 1979, Robert Harris was convicted in the San Diego County Superior Court of two counts of murder in the first degree with special circumstances as well as two counts of kidnapping, and was sentenced to death. At his trial, it was revealed that he had killed James Wheeler without provocation and once raped a fellow inmate in prison. Daniel Harris was convicted of kidnapping and sentenced to six years in state prison; he was released in 1983.

A plea for clemency from California governor Pete Wilson – who had been mayor of San Diego at the time of the killings – was rejected in a live television news conference, where Wilson read a statement acknowledging Harris' abusive childhood but ended with a clear rejection of the clemency request, saying, "As great as is my compassion for Robert Harris the child, I cannot excuse or forgive the choice made by Robert Harris the man." Wilson then left without waiting for reporters' questions.

Harris's death sentence was affirmed by the California Supreme Court in 1981. In 1982, the United States Court of Appeals for the Ninth Circuit granted a writ of habeas corpus relieving Harris of the death sentence, vacating a contrary district court order. The Supreme Court of the United States reimposed Harris' death sentence in Pulley v. Harris (1984), reversing the Ninth Circuit by a vote of 7–2.

In March 1990, federal appeals court judge John T. Noonan Jr. issued a stay of execution in response to Harris arguing that childhood brain damage interfered with his judgment during his crimes.

Harris was scheduled to be executed on April 21, 1992. On April 18, U.S. District Judge Marilyn Hall Patel issued a temporary restraining order barring Harris' execution while she considered his lawsuit challenging the gas chamber's constitutionality. A three-member panel of the Ninth Circuit issued an emergency writ of mandate vacating the restraining order, in which Judge Arthur Alarcón was joined by Judge Melvin T. Brunetti, over the dissent of Judge Noonan.

On April 20, the U.S. Supreme Court vacated a separate stay of execution the Ninth Circuit had issued relating to Harris' habeas corpus petition. That evening, a group of Ninth Circuit judges ordered the execution stayed while the circuit considered granting en banc consideration of his case. Later that evening, the Ninth Circuit entered a third stay blocking the execution while it reconsidered reimposing the lower court's temporary restraining order. The U.S. Supreme Court issued a per curiam decision vacating the Ninth Circuit's stays and allowing the execution to proceed, by a vote of 7–2.

On April 21, 1992, at 3:49 a.m., Harris was strapped into the gas chamber. Seconds before the execution was to begin, Judge Harry Pregerson of the Ninth Circuit stayed the execution for the fourth time, explaining that Harris should be allowed to file a new lawsuit in state court. Two hours later, the U.S. Supreme Court vacated that stay, explicitly ordering that "No further stays of Robert Alton Harris' execution shall be entered by the federal courts except upon order of this Court."

Harris was executed on April 21, 1992, in the gas chamber at San Quentin State Prison – the first execution in California in 25 years. For his last meal, he had requested and was given a 21-piece bucket of Kentucky Fried Chicken, two large Domino's pizzas, a bag of jelly beans, a six-pack of Pepsi, and a pack of Camel cigarettes; the pizzas given to him were actually Tombstone frozen pizzas, as per the prison warden's request. At 6:01 a.m., he was escorted into the gas chamber. The execution order was given at 6:07 a.m. By 6:14 a.m. he had ceased moving and was declared dead seven minutes later.

The execution is remembered for Harris's choice of final words (recorded by Warden Daniel Vasquez): "You can be a king or a street sweeper, but everybody dances with the grim reaper." It was the subject of a 1995 Dutch documentary film, Procedure 769, witness to an execution. His words are based on the 1991 film Bill & Ted's Bogus Journey as "You might be a king or a little street sweeper but sooner or later you dance with the reaper"; the lyric was written by actor William Sadler for his character in the film.

As his execution proceeded, Harris noticed Steve Baker, the father of one of his victims and the police officer who had arrested him in 1978, amongst the witnesses. He mouthed "It's all right" and "I'm sorry" to him, then turned his head away.

== See also ==
- List of people executed in California
- List of people executed in the United States in 1992
- List of serial killers in the United States

Executions carried out in California
Preceded by Aaron Mitchell April 12, 1967	Robert Alton Harris; April 21, 1992	Succeeded by David Edwin Mason August 24, 1993
Executions carried out in the United States
Preceded by Donald Eugene Harding – Arizona April 6, 1992	Robert Alton Harris – California; April 21, 1992	Succeeded by Billy Wayne White – Texas April 23, 1992
