= 2012 California Proposition 34 =

Proposition 34
- November 6, 2012
- Repeal of Proposition 17 (Death Penalty)

Results
Choice	Votes	%
Yes	5,974,243	48.05%
No	6,460,262	51.95%
Total votes	12,434,505	100.00%
County results
For
70%–80%
60%–70%
50%–60%
Against
70%–80%
60%–70%
50%–60%

Proposition 34 was a California ballot measure that was decided by California voters at the statewide election on November 6, 2012. It sought to repeal Proposition 17, originally passed by voters in 1972, thus abolishing the death penalty in California.

The proposition was defeated 52% against to 48% in favor, despite the fact that supporters had spent 6 times more money in the campaign than opponents.

== Background ==
A coalition of law enforcement officials, murder victims’ family members, and wrongly convicted people launched the initiative campaign for the “Savings, Accountability, and Full Enforcement for California Act”, or SAFE California, Prop. 34. If it had been passed by California voters on November 6, 2012, Prop. 34 would have replaced the death penalty with life imprisonment without the possibility of parole, require people sentenced to life in prison without the possibility of parole to work in order to pay restitution to victims’ families, and allocate approximately $30 million per year for three years to police departments for the purpose of solving open murder and rape cases.

On March 1, 2012, the SAFE California Campaign submitted 799,589 signatures to qualify for the election on November 6, 2012. On April 23, 2012, California Secretary of State Debra Bowen announced that the initiative had been approved and would be on the November ballot.

Prop. 34 was ahead in the most recent Los Angeles Times poll, in October 2012, when voters heard about "the financial ramifications and details of [Prop. 34's] effect on prisoners."

== Proponents ==
Proponents of Prop. 34 cite the cost of implementing the death penalty as a major motivating factor behind the initiative. A 2011 study by former prosecutor and federal judge Arthur Alarcón indicates that California has spent approximately $4 billion to execute 13 people since the death penalty was reinstated in 1978. The Legislative Analyst's Office official analysis of the proposition shows that Prop. 34 will likely save taxpayers over 100 million dollars per year.

Proponents of Prop. 34 also cite the possibility of executing an innocent person as a major motivating factor behind the initiative. A recently released study by the Chief Justice Earl Warren Institute on Law and Social Policy at University of California, Berkeley, School of Law, shows that California's rate of wrongful convictions is the highest in the nation.

Supporters of Prop. 34 include:

- The California Democratic Party
- The California Nurses Association
- The League of Women Voters of California
- The California State NAACP
- All the bishops of the Roman Catholic Church in California
- All the bishops of the Episcopal Church in California
- Jeanne Woodford, the former warden of San Quentin State Prison who presided over four executions
- Gil Garcetti, the former district attorney of Los Angeles County
- Franky Carrillo and Obie Anthony, who were wrongly convicted of murder and spent decades in prison before their exoneration
- Deldelp Medina and Aqeela Sherrills, family members of murder victims
- Don Heller, the author of the 1978 initiative that expanded the use of the death penalty in California
- Ron Briggs, a main proponent of the 1978 initiative that expanded the use of the death penalty in California

== Opponents ==
Some Prop. 34 detractors do not believe the studies that indicate that the death penalty in California is more expensive than life in prison without the possibility of parole. Others admit that the system is broken, but hold out hope that it can be fixed, despite the fact that "reform attempts have failed to make it past the California State Legislature."

When proposition 34 was defeated, Michael Rushford, a death penalty supporter, said the election was a call for California officials to "streamline the appeals process, expand the pool of defense attorneys qualified to handle capital cases, and execute inmates with a single lethal drug instead of the three-drug mixture now used".
