= Capital punishment in California =

Capital punishment is a legal penalty in the U.S. state of California. However, the penalty has not been carried out in that state since 2006, due to a standing federal court order issued that year against the practice when using lethal injection not administered by trained medical staff, and a 2019 moratorium on executions ordered by Governor Gavin Newsom. The litigation resulting in the court order has been on hold since the promulgation of the moratorium. Should the moratorium end and the freeze conclude, executions could resume under the current state law.

The state carried out executions until 1972 when the California Supreme Court struck down California's capital punishment statute in the case People v. Anderson. California voters reinstated the death penalty a few months later, with Proposition 17 legalizing the death penalty in the state constitution and ending the Anderson ruling. However, in the interim, the U.S. Supreme Court in Furman v. Georgia imposed a nationwide moratorium on capital punishment. Furman, along with continued challenges at the state level, delayed implementation of Proposition 17 for several years. As a result, the death penalty was not restored in California until 1977, under a statute approved by People v. Frierson in 1979.

The state's first post-Anderson execution was carried out in 1992. Since that time, there have been 13 executions, yet hundreds of inmates have been sentenced. The last execution that took place in California was in 2006. Three death row inmates in California, Kelvin Malone, Alfredo Prieto, and Glen Edward Rogers, have also been executed in Missouri, Virginia, and Florida, respectively.

As of October 2026, official California Department of Corrections and Rehabilitation (CDCR) records show that there are 563 inmates awaiting execution in California, the lowest it has been since 2011, primarily due to suicide, death from other causes, fewer juries willing to sentence people to death, and resentencings by newly elected district attorneys, among other things. 18 of those with death sentences are women, held in general population at Central California Women's Facility (CCWF) in Chowchilla, with the other 545 inmates awaiting execution being men who are housed throughout the state, most having been transferred from the former death row at San Quentin State Prison.

California voters rejected two initiatives to repeal the death penalty by popular vote in 2012 and 2016, and they narrowly adopted in 2016 another proposal to expedite its appeal process. On August 26, 2021, the California Supreme Court upheld the state's death penalty rules though as of 2026 executions have yet to resume.

On November 5, 2026, Governor Newsom announced that he will move to commute the sentences for all 548 prisoners on death row in the state. However, the Supreme Court of California must approve a commutation of a sentence for individuals convicted of more than one felony; 382 individuals on death row have more than one felony conviction.

== History ==
=== Pre-Furman and pre-Anderson history ===
The first known death sentences in the Spanish colony that would become the State of California was recorded in 1778. On April 6, 1778, four Kumeyaay chiefs from a Mission San Diego area ranchería were convicted of conspiring to kill Christians and were sentenced to death by José Francisco Ortega, Commandant of the Presidio of San Diego; the four were to be shot on April 11. However, there is some doubt whether the executions actually took place.

Four methods have been used historically for executions. Until slightly before California was admitted into the Union, executions were carried out by firing squad. Upon admission, the state adopted hanging as the method of choice.

The penal code was modified on February 14, 1872, to state that hangings were to take place inside the confines of the county jail or other private places. The only people allowed to be present were the county sheriff, a physician, and the county District Attorney, who would in addition select at least 12 "reputable citizens". No more than two "ministers of the gospel" and no more than five people selected by the condemned could also be present.

Executions were moved to the state level in 1889 when the law was updated so that hangings would occur in one of the state prisons—San Quentin State Prison and Folsom State Prison. According to the California Department of Corrections, although the law did not require the trial judge to choose a specific prison, it was customary for recidivists to be sent to Folsom. Under these new laws, the first execution at San Quentin was Jose Gabriel on March 3, 1893, for murder. The first hanging at Folsom was Chin Hane, also for murder, on December 13, 1895. A total of 215 inmates were hanged at San Quentin and a total of 93 were hanged at Folsom.

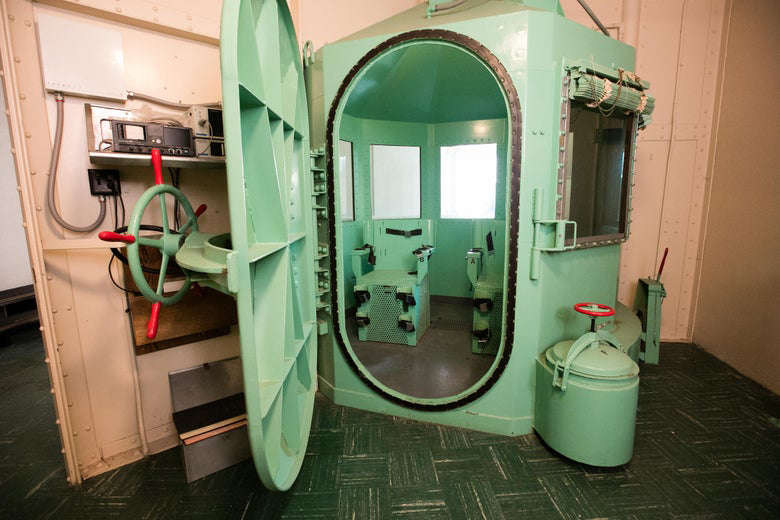
The gas chamber at San Quentin State Prison prior to its disassembly in March 2019. Prior to the completion of the lethal injection room lethal injections were performed within the gas chamber with staff removing the chairs and placing a gurney within the chamber to execute an individual. It was last used to kill an individual with poison gas on August 24, 1993 and last used to kill an individual via injection on January 17, 2006.

California adopted the gas chamber as its sole method in 1937 (though two more hangings took place for people already sentenced). The first people to die in the San Quentin gas chamber (the only one in the state) were Albert Kessell and Robert Lee Cannon on December 2, 1938. Three more people had their death sentences carried out within two weeks. Up until 1967, 194 people were executed by lethal gas, including four women. The last person was Aaron Mitchell on April 12, 1967.

In previous eras the California Institution for Women housed the death row for women.

=== 1972 abolition of capital punishment ===
On April 24, 1972, the Supreme Court of California ruled in People v. Anderson that the state's current death penalty laws were unconstitutional. Justice Marshall F. McComb was the lone dissenter, arguing that the death penalty deterred crime, noting numerous Supreme Court precedents upholding the death penalty's constitutionality, and stating that the legislative and initiative processes were the only appropriate avenues to determine whether the death penalty should be allowed. The majority's decision spared the lives of 105 death row inmates, including Sirhan Sirhan (assassin of Robert F. Kennedy) and serial killer Charles Manson. McComb was so outraged by the decision that he walked out of the courtroom during its reading.

Following the ruling, the Constitution of California was modified to reinstate capital punishment under an initiative called Proposition 17. In 1973 a new statute was subsequently enacted, making the death penalty mandatory for a number of crimes including first degree murder in specific instances, kidnapping during which a victim dies, train wrecking during which a victim dies, treason against the state, and assault by a life prisoner if the victim dies within a year.

The debate over capital punishment played out in a somewhat similar fashion on the national level. On June 29, 1972, the United States Supreme Court issued its decision in Furman v. Georgia, resulting in a de facto moratorium on executions in the United States. On July 2, 1976, the Supreme Court, in Gregg v. Georgia, reviewing capital punishment laws enacted in response to its Furman decision, found constitutional those statutes that allowed a jury to impose the death penalty after consideration of both aggravating and mitigating circumstances. On the same date, the Court held that statutes imposing a mandatory death penalty were unconstitutional.

In a later decision in 1976, the Supreme Court of California again held the state's death penalty statute was unconstitutional as it did not allow the defendant to enter mitigating evidence. A further 70 prisoners had their sentences commuted following this. The next year, the statute was updated to deal with these issues. Life imprisonment without possibility of parole was also added as a punishment for capital offenses. A later change to the statute occurred in 1978 after Proposition 7 was enacted. This gave an automatic appeal to the Supreme Court of California, which would directly affirm or reverse the sentence and conviction without going through an intermediate appeal to the California Courts of Appeal.

In 1983, The State Bar of California created The California Appellate Project as a legal resource center to implement the constitutional right to counsel for indigent persons facing execution. At around the time of its founding, Michael Millman became the director of CAP. Millman served as director of CAP for 30 years. CAP oversees the efforts to assist private lawyers representing the more than 700 people on California's death row.

=== 1986 retention elections ===
On November 4, 1986, three members of the state supreme court were ousted from office by voters after a high-profile campaign that cited their categorical opposition to the death penalty.

This included chief justice Rose Bird, who was removed by a margin of 67 to 33 percent. She reviewed a total of 64 capital cases appealed to the court, in each instance issuing a decision overturning the death penalty that had been imposed at trial. She was joined in her decision to overturn by at least three other members of the court in 61 of those cases. This led Bird's critics to claim that she was substituting her own opinions and ideas for the laws and precedents upon which judicial decisions are supposed to be made.

=== Resumption of executions and introduction of lethal injection ===
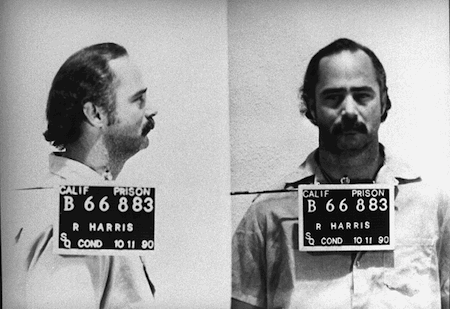
Robert Alton Harris later became the subject of a Dutch documentary.

On April 21, 1992, the state carried out its first execution since 1967 by putting to death Robert Alton Harris for the murders of two teenage boys in San Diego. A series of four stays of execution issued by the Ninth Circuit appeal court delayed the execution, causing the U.S. Supreme Court to intervene to vacate the stays and prohibit all other federal courts from any further intervention, ruling that the lower court decisions caused "abusive delays" and were "attempts to manipulate the judicial process".

The available methods were expanded to two in January 1993, with lethal gas as the standard but with lethal injection offered as a choice for the inmate. David Mason, the first inmate to have this choice, made no selection, so was executed by the lethal gas default in August 1993. Following a legal challenge and Ninth Circuit appeal court decision in 1996, lethal gas was suspended, with lethal injection becoming the only method.

Serial killer William Bonin was the first person to be executed under these new laws, on February 23, 1996. Thirteen people have been executed in California since the death penalty was reinstated in 1977, though 189 other people have died on death row from other causes (32 of them from suicide) as of October 24, 2026.

=== Lethal injection litigation ===
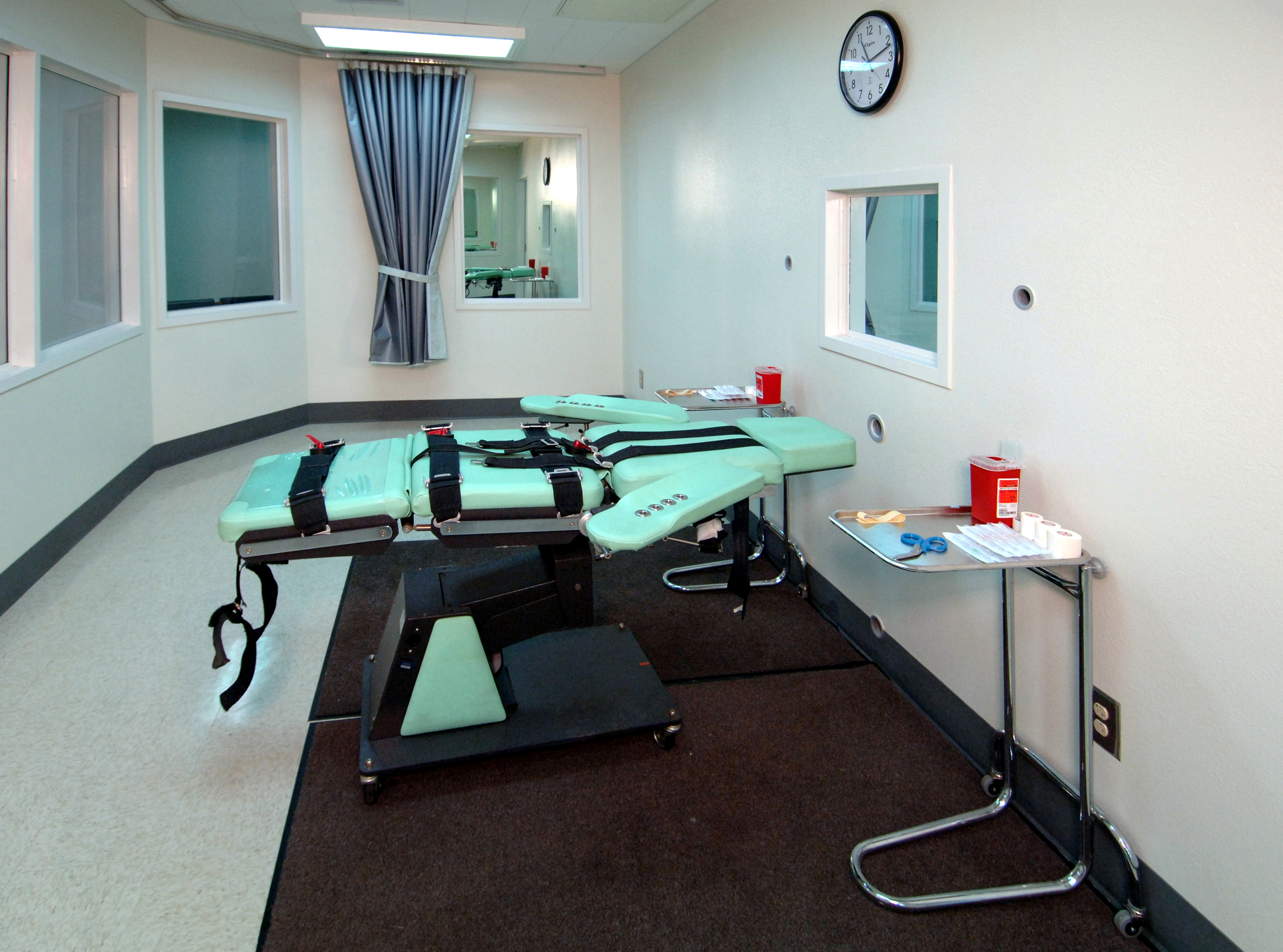
The lethal injection room at San Quentin State Prison prior to its disassembly in March 2019. It was completed in 2010 and was never used.

During the term of Arnold Schwarzenegger as governor, the state carried out two prominent executions in less than five weeks, with Stanley Tookie Williams in December 2005 and Clarence Ray Allen in January 2006.

A month later, in February 2006, U.S. District Court Judge Jeremy D. Fogel blocked the execution of convicted murderer Michael Morales because of a lawsuit against the lethal injection protocol. It was argued that if the three-drug lethal injection procedure were administered incorrectly, it could lead to suffering for the condemned, potentially constituting cruel and unusual punishment. The issue arose from an injunction made by the U.S. 9th Circuit Court of Appeals which held that an execution could only be carried out by a medical technician legally authorized to administer intravenous medications. The case led to a de facto moratorium of capital punishment in California as the state was unable to obtain the services of a licensed medical professional to carry out the execution.

When the state planned the execution of Albert Greenwood Brown in late 2010, Judge Fogel declined to issue a stay, citing the efforts the state made to comply with his earlier ruling. Nonetheless, the Ninth Circuit disagreed and vacated the judgment, further delaying executions in the state.

=== Studies ===
The state supreme court proposed in 2007 that the state adopt a constitutional amendment allowing the assignment of capital appeals to the courts of appeal to alleviate the backlog of such cases.

Several victims' families testified to the California Commission on the Fair Administration of Justice in opposition to capital punishment, explaining that while they had suffered great losses, they did not view retribution as morally acceptable, and that the high cost of capital punishment was preventing the solving of cold cases.

The California Commission on the Fair Administration of Justice in 2008 concluded after an extensive review that under the current death penalty system, death sentences are unlikely ever to be carried out (with extremely rare exceptions) because of a process "plagued with excessive delay" in the appointment of post-conviction counsel and a "severe backlog" in the California Supreme Court's review of death judgments. According to CCFAJ's report, the lapse of time from sentence of death to execution constitutes the longest delay of any death penalty state, and the Commission urged reform to expedite the appeal process.

Another study released in 2011 found that since 1978 capital punishment has cost California about $4 billion. A 2011 article by Arthur Alarcon, long-time judge of the Ninth Circuit Court of Appeal, and law professor Paula Mitchell, concluded that "since reinstating the death penalty in 1978, California taxpayers have spent roughly $4 billion to fund a dysfunctional death penalty system that has carried out no more than 13 executions."

=== July 2014 and November 2015 federal decisions ===
On July 16, 2014, federal judge Cormac J. Carney of the United States District Court ruled that California's death penalty system is unconstitutional because it is arbitrary and plagued with delay. The state has not executed a prisoner since 2006. The judge stated that the current system violates the Eighth Amendment's ban on cruel and unusual punishment by imposing a sentence that "no rational jury or legislature could ever impose: life in prison, with the remote possibility of death."

However, on November 12, 2015, a panel of the U.S. Ninth Circuit Court of Appeals overturned the district court's ruling in a 3-0 published decision. The three judges held that the claim was not justiciable under federal habeas corpus.

=== 2015 state lawsuit ===
In February 2015, Sacramento County Superior Court Judge Shelleyanne Chang ruled that state law compelled the Department of Corrections and Rehabilitation to develop a way to execute inmates by lethal injection. Later that year a new protocol providing a single-drug execution method was developed to comply with the ruling.

This was the result of a lawsuit brought by family members of murder victims. Supporters of capital punishment blamed the nearly three-year wait for a new protocol on "lack of political will" and attempt to render the death penalty "impractical and then argue for repeal on the grounds of practicality".

=== Propositions ===
A coalition of death penalty opponents including law enforcement officials, murder victims' family members, and wrongly convicted people launched an initiative campaign for the "Savings, Accountability, and Full Enforcement for California Act," or SAFE California, in the 2011–12 election cycle. The measure, which became Proposition 34, would replace the death penalty with life imprisonment without the possibility of parole, require people sentenced to life in prison without the possibility of parole to work in order to pay restitution to victims' families, and allocate approximately $30 million per year for three years to police departments for the purpose of solving open murder and rape cases. Supporters of the measure raised $6.5 million; opponents of Proposition 34 raised $1 million.

The proposition was defeated with 52% against and 48% in favor.

On November 8, 2016, California voted on two competing initiatives about capital punishment. Proposition 62 which, as Proposition 34, would have abolished the death penalty, was rejected by a 53–47 margin. The other initiative, Proposition 66, provides the streamlining of the capital appeal process, and also requires death-row offenders to work in jail and pay restitution to victims families, something they were previously exempted from. The measure passed 51–49. Its constitutionality was upheld 5–2 by the state supreme court on August 24, 2017, though the court held that one provision requiring it to decide direct appeals of capital cases within five years was directive rather than mandatory. The court ordered that Prop 66 take effect after this decision becomes final.

On December 7, 2020, Assembly members Marc Levine (D-10) and David Chiu (D-17) introduced Assembly Constitutional Amendment 2 to the California State Legislature. The constitutional amendment would have amended the constitution to prohibit the use of capital punishment as a punishment for any violations of law. The amendment was coauthored by Assemblymembers Laura Friedman (D-43), Mike Gipson (D-64), and Mark Stone (D-29), along with state senator Scott Wiener (D-11). The resolution died after it failed to advance to the Assembly floor from the Assembly Committee on Public Safety.

=== 2019 moratorium and 2026 commutations ===
In 2019, Gavin Newsom stated, "I will not oversee the execution of any person while Governor...Our death penalty system has been, by all measures, a failure." Governor Gavin Newsom promulgated Executive Order N-09-19 on March 13, 2019, ordering that:

1. An executive moratorium on the death penalty shall be instituted in the form of a reprieve for all people sentenced to death in California. This moratorium does not provide for the release of any person from prison or otherwise alter any current conviction or sentence.
2. California's lethal injection protocol shall be repealed.
3. The Death Chamber at San Quentin shall be immediately closed in light of the foregoing.

The Executive Order granted everybody sentenced to death under California law a reprieve while also eliminating any mechanism that the state could use to execute an individual by repealing the lethal injection protocol adopted by the State of California. If the Executive Order was rescinded and all lawsuits challenging the use of capital punishment in the state are resolved executions would not resume immediately since the state would need to adopt a new execution protocol which requires time to do so. The Executive Order also closed the Death Chamber at San Quentin State Prison. The Death Chamber was subsequently dismantled by the California Department of Corrections and Rehabilitation.

No person sentenced to death in California was released or had their conviction or sentence altered due to the promulgation of the Executive Order. In September 2019 the California Supreme Court declined to hear a case by two defendants out of LA facing the death penalty. The attorneys in the cases had argued that jurors might be more inclined to issue the death penalty during the moratorium, viewing it as a way to send a message rather than as an actual death sentence.

Since then, Newsom has done more work to ensure that people who were convicted of crimes "on the basis of race, ethnicity, or national origin," or those who were mentally incompetent, can have the possibility to receive relief from their convictions. As of 2023, he also has done work to move people in San Quentin Prison on death row into prisons throughout the state so they can be a part of the general population, rather than being isolated with those on death row.

On November 5, 2026 Governor Newsom commuted the sentences for all 548 prisoners on death row in the state. This came two days after Xavier Becerra was elected governor. Becerra had said during the campaign that he intended to leave the moratorium in place.

=== People v. McDaniel ===
Donte McDaniel, a condemned inmate, was sentenced to death in 2004 and has challenged his death sentence by challenging California's sentencing statutes that only require convictions to be proven beyond a reasonable doubt and to be unanimous but not requiring either for sentencing decisions. Therefore, under current law, a defendant needs to be found guilty by all jurors beyond a reasonable doubt but the jury does not need to be unanimous to find true any aggravating circumstances that makes one eligible to be sentenced to death, nor does the jury have to find those circumstances to be true beyond a reasonable doubt. If the Supreme Court of California rules in McDaniel's favor, hundreds of death sentences would be overturned and the court may strike down capital punishment in the state in its entirety. McDaniel has received the support of Governor Gavin Newsom along with the county district attorneys of Contra Costa, Los Angeles, San Francisco, San Joaquin, and Santa Clara counties, along with former Los Angeles County District Attorney Gil Garcetti in an amicus curiae brief filed with the court.

On August 26, 2021, efforts to overhaul California's death penalty were weakened after the California State Supreme Court unanimously ruled that current state law provided little legal support for any overhaul in the case of People v. McDaniel.

== Current legislation ==
=== Legal process ===
When the prosecution seeks the death penalty, the sentence is decided by the jury and must be unanimous. A death sentence is automatically considered to have been requested for reconsideration, and the judge must make a determination as to whether the "jury's findings and verdicts that the aggravating circumstances outweigh the mitigating circumstances are contrary to law or the evidence presented."

A jury must unanimously find that one of the special circumstances outlined in the death penalty statute apply to the case. If the jury is not unanimous, the court will retry the question of whether the special circumstances that were not unanimously decided upon apply or not before a new jury. Subsequent retrials on issues not unanimously decided upon occur at the discretion of the court, which may alternatively impose a sentence of 25 years in prison.

In case of a hung jury during the penalty determination in the penalty phase of the trial, a retrial happens before another jury. If the second or any subsequent jury is also deadlocked, the judge has discretion to order another retrial or impose a life without parole sentence.

Under the state Constitution, the power of clemency belongs to the Governor of California. But if the offender was twice convicted of a felony, the governor can grant a commutation only on recommendation of the Supreme Court of California, with at least four judges concurring.

Executions are carried out by lethal injection, but an inmate sentenced before its adoption may elect to be executed by gas inhalation instead. If one of these two methods is held invalid, the state is required to use the other method.

=== Capital offenses ===
California has one of the broadest lists of capital crimes and capital circumstances in the United States. The Penal Code provides for the possibility for a sentence of death for:

==== Of crimes against the person ====
- first-degree murder with special circumstances
  - for financial gain (1)
  - the defendant had previously been convicted of first or second degree murder (2)
  - multiple murders (3)
  - committed using explosives (4); (6)
  - to avoid arrest or aiding in escaping custody (5)
  - the victim was an on-duty peace officer; federal law enforcement officer or agent; or firefighter (7); (8); (9)
  - the victim was a witness to a crime and the murder was committed to prevent them from testifying (10)
  - the victim was a prosecutor or assistant prosecutor; judge or former judge; elected or appointed official; juror; and the murder was in retaliation for the victim's official duties (11); (12); (13); (20)
  - the murder was "especially heinous, atrocious, or cruel, manifesting exceptional depravity" (14)
  - the murderer lay in wait for the victim (15)
  - the victim was intentionally killed because of their race, religion, nationality, or sexual orientation (a hate crime) (16)
  - the murder was committed during the committing of a robbery; kidnapping; rape; sodomy; performance of a lewd or lascivious act upon the person of a child under the age of 14 years; oral copulation; burglary; arson; train wrecking; mayhem; rape by instrument; carjacking; torture; poisoning (17)
  - the murder was intentional and involved the infliction of torture (18)
  - poisoning (19)
  - the murder was committed by discharging a firearm from a motor vehicle (21)
  - the defendant is an active member of a criminal street gang and was to further the activities of the gang (22)
- train wrecking which leads to a person's death
- fatal assault by a state prisoner under a life sentence, subject to the year and a day rule, if either of the following are true:
  - with a deadly weapon; or
  - with force likely to cause great bodily injury
- Felony murder only when:
  - aiding, abetting, counseling, commanding, inducing, soliciting, requesting, or assisting in the commission of a felony enumerated in above in enhancement 17, with reckless indifference to human life and as a major participant, which results in a death, even if the defendant is not the actual killer.

Due to the number of capital circumstances in California, almost every first-degree murder is punishable by death.

==== Of crimes against the state ====
- treason against the state of California, defined as levying war against the state, adhering to its enemies, or giving them aid and comfort
- perjury or subornation of perjury causing execution of an innocent person

Additionally, the Military and Veterans Code provides for possible capital punishment in either of the following if such act or acts, or failure to act, results in a death:

- intentionally and maliciously destroying, impairing, injuring, interfering, or tampering with real or personal property with reasonable grounds to believe that such act will hinder, delay, or interfere with the preparation of the United States or any of the states from preparing for war, or any foreign nation which assistance by the United States is in connection with that nation's defense; or
- intentionally and maliciously making or causing to be made or intentionally and maliciously omitting to note on inspection any defect in any article or thing with reasonable grounds to believe that such article or thing is intended to be used in connection with the preparation of the United States or any state for defense or for war, or for the prosecution of war by the United States, or with the rendering of assistance by the United States to any other nation in connection with that nation's defense, or that such article or thing is one of a number of similar articles or things, some of which are intended so to be used.

== Death row and execution chamber ==
=== Former procedure ===
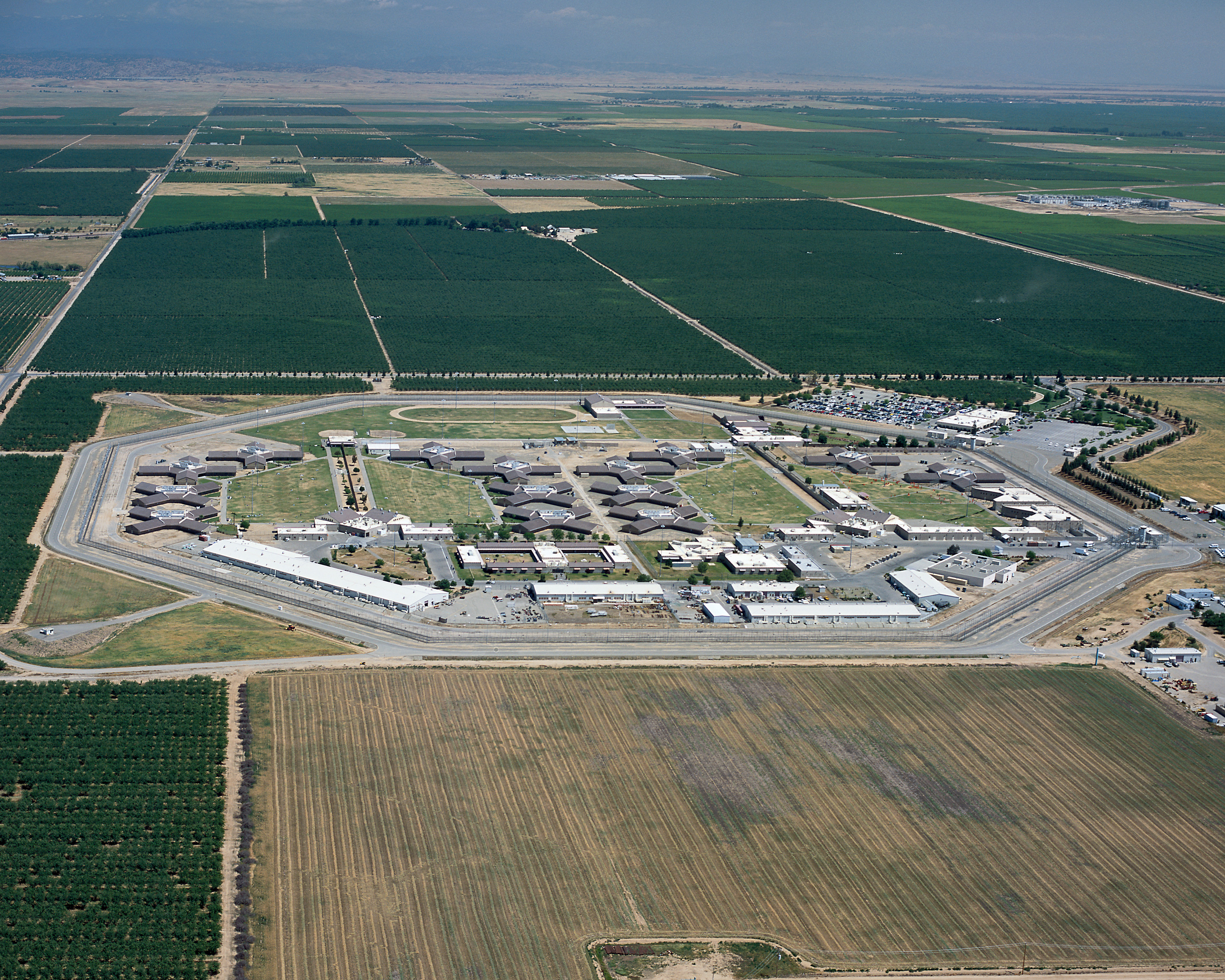
Central California Women's Facility, where female condemned inmates are held

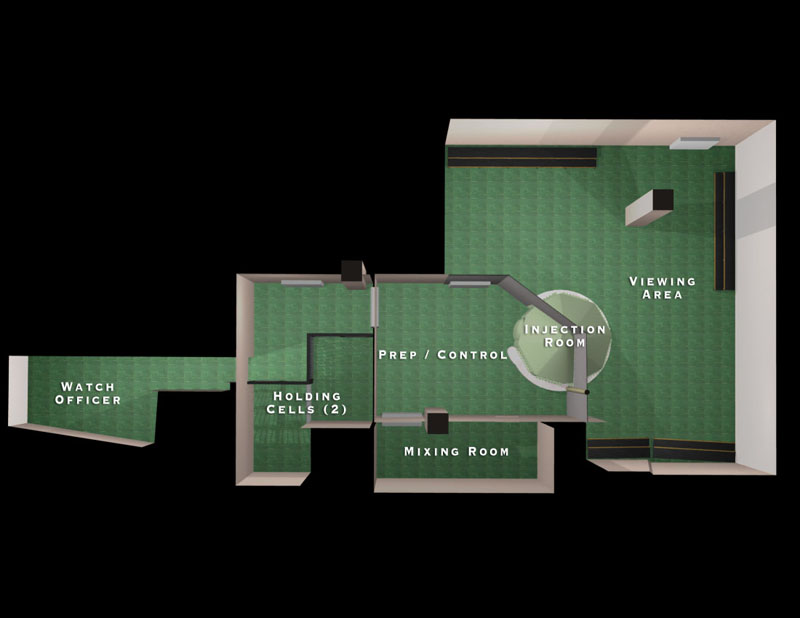
The floor plan of the old intravenous execution area in San Quentin State Prison (labeled "injection room")

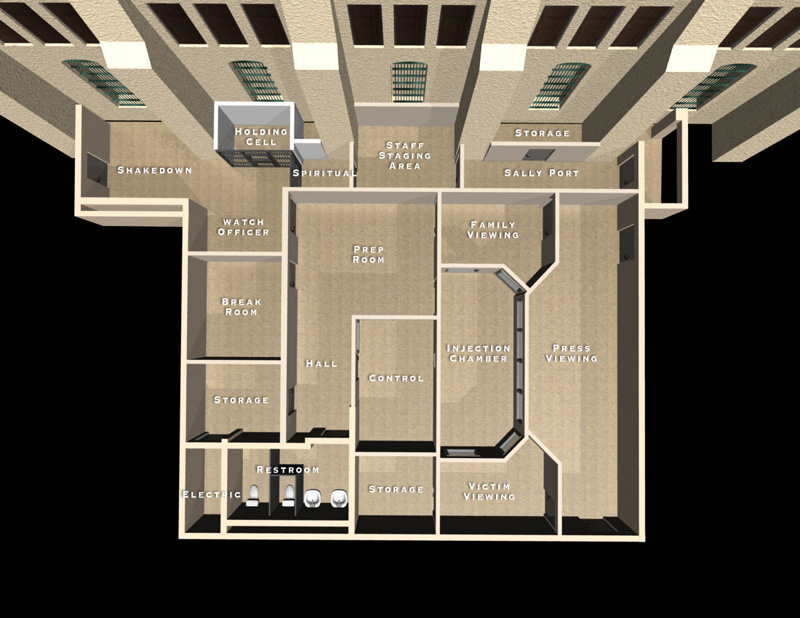
The floor plan of the intravenous execution area in San Quentin State Prison

Men condemned to death in California were (with some exceptions) typically held at San Quentin State Prison, with condemned women being held at Central California Women's Facility (CCWF) in Chowchilla. San Quentin also houses the state execution chamber, although it is now permanently closed. Women executed in California would have been transported to San Quentin before being put to death.

=== Current statistics ===
As of September 2026, official California Department of Corrections and Rehabilitation (CDCR) records show 564 inmates sentenced to death in California, the lowest it has been since 2011, primarily due to suicide, death from other causes, fewer juries willing to sentence anyone to death, and resentencing by newly elected progressive district attorneys, among other things. 18 of those so sentenced are women, held at Central California Women's Facility (CCWF) in Chowchilla.

=== Dismantling of death rows ===
On January 31, 2022, Governor Gavin Newsom announced that the current death row at San Quentin State Prison will be dismantled within two years and that the inmates housed at said facility will be transferred to other maximum security state prisons. In that time, the death row at San Quentin will be repurposed "into something innovative and anchored in rehabilitation," according to corrections' spokeswoman Vicky Waters.

Inmates transferred will be required to work paid prison jobs, albeit that 70% of their wages will be withheld and designated as restitution to the families of the relevant victims. A pilot program removed 116 condemned men to other facilities between 2020 and 2022. The women incarcerated at Chowchilla State Prison also had the opportunity to move to less restrictive housing and work programs.

By February 5, 2025, all but 9 of the male inmates had been moved out of San Quentin, with the last group expected to transfer after completing medical and psychiatric programs. All women on death row at Chowchilla had been moved to general population.

=== Racial makeup of death row ===
As of October 2026, black people constitute a plurality of inmates sentenced to death, with 32.50% of inmates sentenced to death being black. The second largest group of people sentenced to death are White (30.91%), while Hispanics/Mexicans are the third largest group of people sentenced to death (28.06%).

== Criticisms ==
In 2008, the California Commission on the Fair Administration of Justice criticized the high number of aggravating factors as giving to local prosecutors too much discretion in picking cases where they believe capital punishment is warranted. The Commission proposed to reduce them to only five (multiple murders, torture murder, murder of a police officer, murder committed in jail, and murder related to another felony). Columnist Charles Lane went further, and proposed that murder related to a felony other than rape should no longer be a capital crime when there is only one victim killed.

In 2021, the California Committee on Revision of Penal Code unanimously voted to recommend that the Legislature abolish capital punishment in the state. A staff justified the vote by issuing a memorandum that states that "[e]liminating the death penalty is a critical step towards creating a fair and equitable justice system for all in California, as the ultimate punishment is plagued by legal, racial, bureaucratic, financial, geographic, and moral problems that have proven intractable."

== Public opinion ==
Results on 2012 California Proposition 34

Results on 2016 California Proposition 62

The Field Research Corporation found in February 2004 that when asked how they personally felt about capital punishment, 68% supported it and 31% opposed it (6% offered no opinion). This was a decrease from 72% support two years previous, and an increase from 63% in 2000. This poll was asked about the time that Kevin Cooper had his execution stayed hours before his scheduled death after 20 years on death row. When asked if they thought the death penalty was generally fair and free of error in California, 58% agreed and 32% disagreed (11% offered no opinion). When the results were broken down along ethnicity, of the people who identified themselves as African American, 57% disagreed that the death penalty was fair and free of error.

A poll in March 2012 found that "61% of registered voters from the state of California say they would vote to keep the death penalty, should a death penalty initiative appear on the November 2012 ballot". An August 2012 poll found that "support for Prop 34, which would repeal California's death penalty, fell from 45.5% to 35.9%."

A PPIC poll from September 2012 showed that 55% of all adults and 50% of likely voters prefer life in prison without the possibility of parole over the death penalty when given the choice.

A Field Poll in September 2014 showed that 56% support the death penalty, down from 69% three years earlier. Support for the death penalty in California had not been at this low a level since the mid-1960s.

A UC Berkeley Institute of Governmental Studies poll in 2019 found that 61% of California's registered voters supported the death penalty, with 39% opposed. However, this poll did not have an "undecided" option.

A UC Berkeley Institute of Governmental Studies poll in April 2021 found that 44% of California's registered voters supported a proposed 2022 constitutional amendment to abolish the death penalty, with 35% opposed and 21% undecided. 48% supported Governor Gavin Newsom's death penalty moratorium executive order, with 35% opposed. The poll found sharp racial and partisan divides on support for the death penalty in the state, with Democrats opposing it 63%-37% and Republicans supporting it 68%-32%. No party preference voters opposed it 43%-31%. Among registered voters, 54% of African-Americans, 46% of whites, 41% of Latinos, and 38% of Asian and Pacific Islanders supported abolition.

== Statistics ==
=== Sentencing numbers by county ===
Number of death sentences per county as of October 2026, prior to the commutation of all sentences. There were 563 inmates awaiting execution but 568 sentences listed due to some inmates having been sentenced to death in multiple counties.

County of conviction	Number of active death sentences	Notes
Alameda	16	
Alpine	0	
Amador	1	
Butte	3	
Calaveras	0	
Colusa	2	
Contra Costa	11	
Del Norte	0	
El Dorado	4	
Fresno	11	
Glenn	0	
Humboldt	0	
Imperial	2	
Inyo	0	
Kern	26	
Kings	6	
Lake	1	
Lassen	0	
Los Angeles	163	During the tenure of DA George Gascón (2020 - 2024) no death sentences were sought in LA County. He also made applications to re-sentence death row inmates to life imprisonment without parole, only 38 of which were successful. The policy of not seeking death sentences ended after Nathan Hochman took office in December 2024.
Madera	2	
Marin	2	
Mariposa	0	
Mendocino	0	
Merced	0	
Modoc	1	Least populous county that has an outstanding capital conviction for a living person.
Mono	0	
Monterey	4	
Napa	2	
Nevada	0	
Orange	51	
Placer	1	
Plumas	0	
Riverside	88	Second-highest number of death sentences per capita among the 10 most populous counties in the state (around one death sentence per 29,000 residents)
Sacramento	24	
San Benito	0	
San Bernardino	39	
San Diego	34	
San Francisco	0	Most populous county with no inmate awaiting execution.
San Joaquin	4	
San Luis Obispo	2	
San Mateo	8	
Santa Barbara	3	
Santa Clara	7	
Santa Cruz	0	
Shasta	5	
Sierra	0	
Siskiyou	0	
Solano	1	
Sonoma	3	
Stanislaus	8	
Sutter	0	
Tehama	0	
Trinity	0	
Tulare	15	
Tuolumne	1	
Ventura	15	
Yolo	2	
Yuba	0	

=== Ethnicity ===
Number of condemned per ethnicity as of October 2026, prior to the commutation of all sentences.

Ethnicity	Total	Percent	Total males	Total females
Black	183	32.50%	181	2
White	174	30.91%	166	8
Mexican	112	19.89%	109	3
Hispanic	46	8.17%	45	1
Other	31	5.51%	30	1
American Indian/Alaskan Native	9	1.60%	8	1
Asian	7	1.24%	5	2
Pacific Islander	1	0.18%	1	0
Total	563	100%	545	18

=== Age range ===
Number of condemned per age as of October 2026, prior to the commutation of all sentences.

Age	Total	Percent	Total males	Total females
20–29	2	0.36%	2	0
30–39	26	4.62%	26	0
40–49	96	17.05%	92	4
50–59	192	34.10%	186	6
60–69	155	27.53%	150	5
70–79	79	14.03%	76	3
80–89	11	1.95%	11	0
90–99	2	0.36%	2	0
	563	100%	545	18

=== Year received ===
List of the year when each one of the people currently on death row were received by the California Department of Corrections and Rehabilitation as of October 2026, prior to the commutation of all sentences.

Year	Total	Percent	Total males	Total females
1979	3	0.53%	3	0
1981	6	1.07%	6	0
1982	7	1.24%	7	0
1983	6	1.07%	6	0
1984	11	1.95%	11	0
1985	7	1.24%	7	0
1986	6	1.07%	6	0
1987	10	1.78%	10	0
1988	17	3.02%	17	0
1989	13	2.31%	13	0
1990	12	2.13%	11	1
1991	9	1.60%	9	0
1992	23	4.09%	20	3
1993	16	2.84%	16	0
1994	13	2.31%	12	1
1995	17	3.02%	17	0
1996	28	4.97%	28	0
1997	22	3.91%	22	0
1998	24	4.26%	23	1
1999	33	5.86%	33	0
2000	25	4.44%	25	0
2001	12	2.13%	12	0
2002	12	2.13%	10	2
2003	16	2.84%	16	0
2004	6	1.07%	6	0
2005	16	2.84%	16	0
2006	11	1.95%	10	1
2007	15	2.66%	15	0
2008	19	3.37%	19	0
2009	23	4.09%	22	1
2010	23	4.09%	20	3
2011	6	1.07%	6	0
2012	11	1.95%	10	1
2013	17	3.02%	17	0
2014	9	1.60%	8	1
2015	13	2.31%	12	1
2016	6	1.07%	6	0
2017	12	2.13%	10	2
2018	4	0.71%	4	0
2019	2	0.36%	2	0
2020	3	0.53%	3	0
2021	5	0.89%	5	0
2022	2	0.36%	2	0
2023	2	0.36%	2	0
2024	3	0.53%	3	0
2025	5	0.89%	5	0
2026	2	0.36%	2	0

== See also ==
- List of people executed in California
- List of death row inmates in the United States § California
- Crime in California
- Law of California
- Capital punishment in the United States
- Procedure 769, witness to an execution
- Last Day of Freedom
