= Procedure 769, Witness to an Execution =

1995 Dutch documentary film

- Film poster depicting the San Quentin gas chamber
- Directed by: Jaap van Hoewijk
- Release date: 1995
- Country: The Netherlands
- Language: English

Procedure 769, Witness to an Execution is a 1995 Dutch documentary film by director Jaap van Hoewijk about the gas chamber execution of convicted murderer Robert Alton Harris in 1992. The documentary features interviews of eleven witnesses to Harris's execution, including members of Harris's victims' families, members of Harris's family, the warden of San Quentin State Prison where the execution took place, and a psychologist.

== Background ==
The film's title is derived from the phrase "Procedure 769," which is "the administrative name for the death penalty" in California, where Robert Harris's execution took place. The procedure establishes California's execution protocol.

== Synopsis ==
The documentary begins with a recitation of an excerpt from "A Hanging," a 1931 short story by George Orwell summarizing his experience witnessing the execution of a Burmese man by hanging. Each witness is then introduced. Afterwards, the documentary summarizes Harris's double robbery-murders of two teenage boys, featuring copious amounts of television footage interspersed with interviews providing commentary and recollections from the victims' family members. The documentary then focuses on Harris's troubled upbringing, featuring interviews of Harris's brother and distant cousin. Harris's brother, his distant cousin, and the warden of San Quentin Prison recount Harris's last few days and hours before his execution, including a moment when Harris was strapped into the gas chamber but removed after receiving a last-minute stay of execution.

The documentary then covers each witness's experience and perspective of Harris's execution, which took place at approximately 6:00 am on Tuesday, April 21, 1992. Those who supported Harris's execution recounted that his death appeared to have occurred quickly and painlessly, while those in his family and those who opposed his execution recounted that Harris appeared to have been in severe pain as he struggled to avoid inhaling the lethal hydrocyanic gas.

== Reception ==
Procedure 769, Witness to an Execution received mostly positive reviews from critics. One review from the Los Angeles Times praised the documentary for its "compelling" presentation, calling the film a complement to Dead Man Walking and stating that "[i]n its detachment and spareness, it actually asks the viewer to think for himself." A separate review from Courier News called the film "balanced" and "a nonfiction counterpart" to Dead Man Walking.

One review from The Sunday Telegraph was mixed, criticizing the "confusing" nature of the film when it came to the witnesses' contradicting impressions of Harris's execution. The reviewer criticized the presentation of the witnesses' differing accounts for making it difficult to visualize Harris's execution.

The film won the Silver Spire Award at the San Francisco International Film Festival.
