= 2016 California Proposition 66 =

Proposition 66
- Death Penalty Procedure Time Limits

Results
Choice	Votes	%
Yes	6,626,159	51.13%
No	6,333,731	48.87%
Valid votes	12,959,890	88.70%
Invalid or blank votes	1,650,619	11.30%
Total votes	14,610,509	100.00%
Registered voters/turnout	19,411,771	75.27%
County results
For
60%–70%
50%–60%
Against
60%–70%
50%–60%

Proposition 66 was a California ballot proposition on the November 8, 2016, ballot to change procedures governing California state court challenges to capital punishment in California, designate superior court for initial petitions, limit successive petitions, require appointed attorneys who take noncapital appeals to accept death penalty appeals, and exempt prison officials from existing regulation process for developing execution methods.

The intention of Proposition 66 was to speed up the process of capital trials and executions. Proposition 66 was approved by voters in the November general election, with 51.1% voting to speed up executions. Proposition 62, which would have abolished the death penalty in California, was rejected by voters in the same election, with 53.1% voting against it. If voters had passed both Proposition 62 and Proposition 66, then the measure with the most "Yes" votes would have taken effect.

The measure was opposed by the editorial boards of the Los Angeles Times, the San Francisco Chronicle, and The Sacramento Bee.

== State supreme court ruling ==
After Prop 66 passed, former California Attorney General John Van de Kamp, along with Ron Briggs (whose father John Briggs was the sponsor of Prop 7 in 1978, which expanded capital punishment in California), challenged the measure in court. On December 20, 2016, the California Supreme Court stopped Prop 66 from going into effect pending resolution of the legal challenge.

The measure's constitutionality was upheld 5–2 on August 24, 2017, though the state supreme court held that one provision requiring it to decide direct appeals of capital cases within five years was directive rather than mandatory. The court ordered that Prop 66 take effect after this decision becomes final.
