= Southall (surname) =

Southall is a surname, and may refer to

- David Southall, British paediatrician
- Ivan Southall (1921–2008), Australian children's author
- James P. C. Southall (1871–1962), American physicist
- Joseph Southall (1861–1944), Arts and Crafts Movement painter
- Neville Southall (born 1958), Welsh professional footballer
- Mark T. Southall (1911–1976), American politician
- Nicky Southall (born 1972), English professional footballer
- Patricia Southall (born 1970), American former beauty queen
- Read Southall Band, American musical ensemble fronted by singer Read Southall
- Tom Southall (1877–1949), New Zealand cricketer

== See also ==
- Southall, a West London suburb
- Southwell (disambiguation)
