= Southwell (surname) =

Southwell is a surname. Notable people with the surname include:

- Alec Southwell, Australian lawyer and judge
- Alfredo Salazar Southwell (1913–1937), aviator
- Anne Southwell (1574–1636), English poet
- Charles Southwell (1814–1860), journalist
- David Southwell (born 1971), author
- Dayle Southwell (born 1993), professional footballer
- Elizabeth Southwell (courtier) (died 1631), English courtier
- Elizabeth Southwell (1674–1709), English aristocrat
- Hugo Southwell (born 1980), rugby player
- Owen J. T. Southwell (1892–1961), American architect
- Paul Southwell (1913–1979), Premier of Dominica and Saint Kitts-Nevis
- Paul Southwell (rugby union) (born 1956), Australian rugby union player
- Richard V. Southwell (1888–1970), mathematician specializing in applied mechanics
- Richard Southwell (disambiguation)
- Robert Southwell (disambiguation)
