= Sabine Aubert =

French conductor

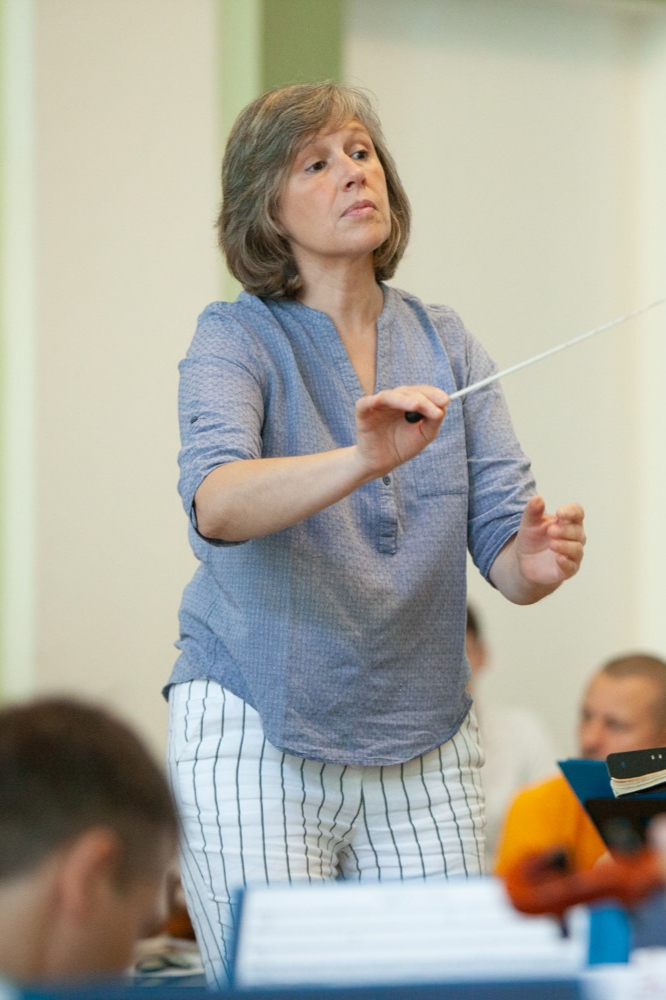
- Aubert in 2019
- Born: Sabine Marie Genevieve Aubert; 31 August 1968 (age 57)
- Education: Conservatoire de Paris Paris-Sorbonne University
- Occupation: Conductor
- Awards: Knight of the National Order of Merit
- Website: sabine-aubert.fr

Sabine Marie Genevieve Aubert, born 31 August 1968 in Paris, is a French conductor. At the age of 20, she founded her own orchestra, the Odyssey Symphony Orchestra (in French Odyssée Symphonique). During her career, she contributed to make symphonic music accessible to everyone.

== Biography ==
=== Early life ===
At the age of 24, she earned her conducting degree before entering the Conservatoire de Paris. Aubert holds a master's degree in musicology from the Sorbonne University. She also studied at the conservatoire of Boulonge-Billancourt and Reims.

=== Career ===
==== Conducting ====
She founded the Odyssée Symphonique orchestra in 1990 at the age of 20, which she has been conducting since. The orchestra based in Gif-sur-Yvette, composed of 60 musicians, gives about ten concerts per year. He performs in France, (mainly in Paris and the Paris region) but also in England. Aubert has collaborated with many soloists such as Marianne Piketty (Victoires de la musique classique, International Classical Music Awards), Xavier Gagnepain, Anne Queffélec, Alexandros Kapelis, Marie-Catherine Girod.

In 2005, she was selected as assistant conductor to Kurt Masur at the Orchestre National de France.

Her contracts have led her to conduct orchestras on international stages as a guest conductor and to participate in festivals. In February 2012, she was engaged as a guest conductor at the National Philharmonic Orchestra of Bacau in Romania.

Chosen as a scholarship holder of the Richard Wagner National Circle at the Bayreuth Festival, she has participated in several master classes in co-direction. Gustav Meier in Germany, with orchestra of Göttingen, Marek Janowski in France and in the Netherlands, with Orchestre Français des Jeunes, Gianluigi Gelmetti and Yuri Ahronovich at the Accademia Musicale Chigiana in Italia, with Sofia Festival orchestra and Jean-Sébastien Béreau in Portugal, with Lisbon Metropolitan Orchestra.

Aubert has the status of artist-in-residence in Essonne.

==== Choral conducting ====
At the same time, she directs several choirs, including Rosnarho Ma Non Troppo, between 2009 and June 2013, with whom she has a "privileged relationship" stemming from family ties. Thereafter, she will continue to participate for the selection of programs.

She co-founded the Amazing Grace children choir, affiliated with the French federation of petits chœurs, which has already toured France, Germany, England, Belgium, Croatia and Sweden. The choir aims to spread messages of peace on earth.

==== Notable events ====
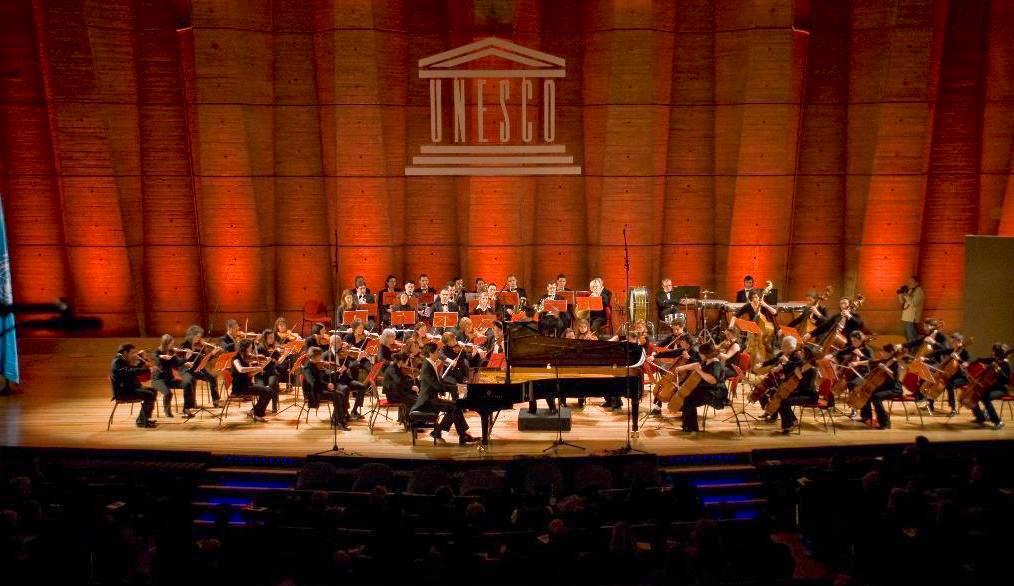
Odyssée Symphonique at l'UNESCO 2010

In January 2010, a concert was held at UNESCO headquarters in Paris to celebrate the 20th anniversary of the Odyssée Symphonique.

In October 2013, the orchestra is on tour for the centenary of Charles Péguy. This is the adaptation in Oratorio by itself based on the work of the Bernard Esposito's poem, at the Chartres cathedral. The creation was labeled by the mission of the first World War centenary.

In January 2016, a concert with all proceeds going to the non-governmental organisation One heart for peace to benefit sick children was organized with volunteer musicians.

In June 2016, the Odyssée Symphonique gave two concerts of Paul McCartney's Liverpool Oratorio bringing together more than 150 musicians and two orchestras (one French, the other English), an adult choir and a children's choir, and five soloists at La Madeleine in Paris but also at Saffron Walden, near Cambridge, at Saffron Hall.

In January 2019, the Odyssée Symphonique joined forces with the Limours choir to perform Carl Orff's Carmina Burana. About 100 musicians, 60 choristers and 3 soloists came together.

In September 2021, Aubert directed Paul Loridant's tribute former mayor of the town of Les Ulis where she grew up.

== Awards ==
=== Prizes ===
Aubert has won several prizes in conducting and choral conducting, orchestration, piano, music history, analysis and musical training.

- 1987 : Golden medial in musical studies
- 1989 : Prize of musical analysis
- 1993 : Piano medal
- 1994 : First Prize in musical writing
- 1996 : First Prize in orchestration with unanimous congratulations of the jury
- 1999 : First Prize in choral conducting with unanimity

=== Decorations ===
Aubert was honored Knight of the National Order of Merit on 2 May 2017

== Filmography ==
Aubert has participated in several film soundtracks by conducting her orchestra. She is at the origin of the scene, the trial, of the short film, Bhaï-Bahï (2005) directed by Olivier Klein. As a result, the short film was awarded best music in the 2006 Lutin short-film awards, best film score at the Portobello Film Festival in 2006 and Grand Prix for best original music at the Aubagne international film festival in 2007.

She also collaborated with composer Gilles Migliori for the French film Müetter (2006).

== Publications ==
1991, L' enseignement de la direction d’orchestre à Paris en 1990-1991, directed by Danièle Pistone^{OCLC 690192618}
