= Myriam Avalos =

Peruvian classical pianist

Myriam Avalos (Avalos-Teie) (born Lima, Peru) is a classical pianist.

== Life ==
She began to study the piano at age two. She gave her first public performance at age three, and shortly after that was admitted to the National Conservatory of Music in Lima. She studied there with Luisa Negri and Teresa Quesada. After winning a concerto competition sponsored by the National Symphony Orchestra of Peru, she made her orchestral debut with that orchestra at age twelve. She was awarded a full scholarship to the Eastman School of Music, where she studied with Frank Glazer, and obtained both her bachelor's and master's degrees in piano performance in three years.

The Organization of American States gave her a special grant that enabled her to study in the United States with the pianists Ellen Mack, Menahem Pressler and Harvey Wedeen, and in Europe with the Hungarian pianist Louis Kentner. She later worked with Marilyn Neeley, and earned a doctoral degree in chamber music from the Catholic University of America . In 2004, she was given the title of cultural ambassador by the Government of Peru. She is a collaborative pianist at the Kennedy Center for the Performing Arts, has a private music studio in Northern Virginia, and is a faculty member and regular performing artist at the Apple Hill Center for Chamber Music Summer Festival.

Myriam Avalos' performances and master classes throughout the United States, Latin America, Europe, and Asia have earned her critical acclaim as a soloist, teacher and chamber musician. Her appearances and broadcasts include the Phillips Collection, the Kennedy Center, Dumbarton Concert Series, Purcell Room in London, Royal Academy of Music in Stockholm, Voice of the OAS, San Antonio Festival, WGMS Radio, Teatro Municipal de Lima and two US State Department-sponsored tours of China and Brazil. She has recorded for the MSR Classics label.

She lives in Annandale, Virginia.
