= Colegio San Andrés =

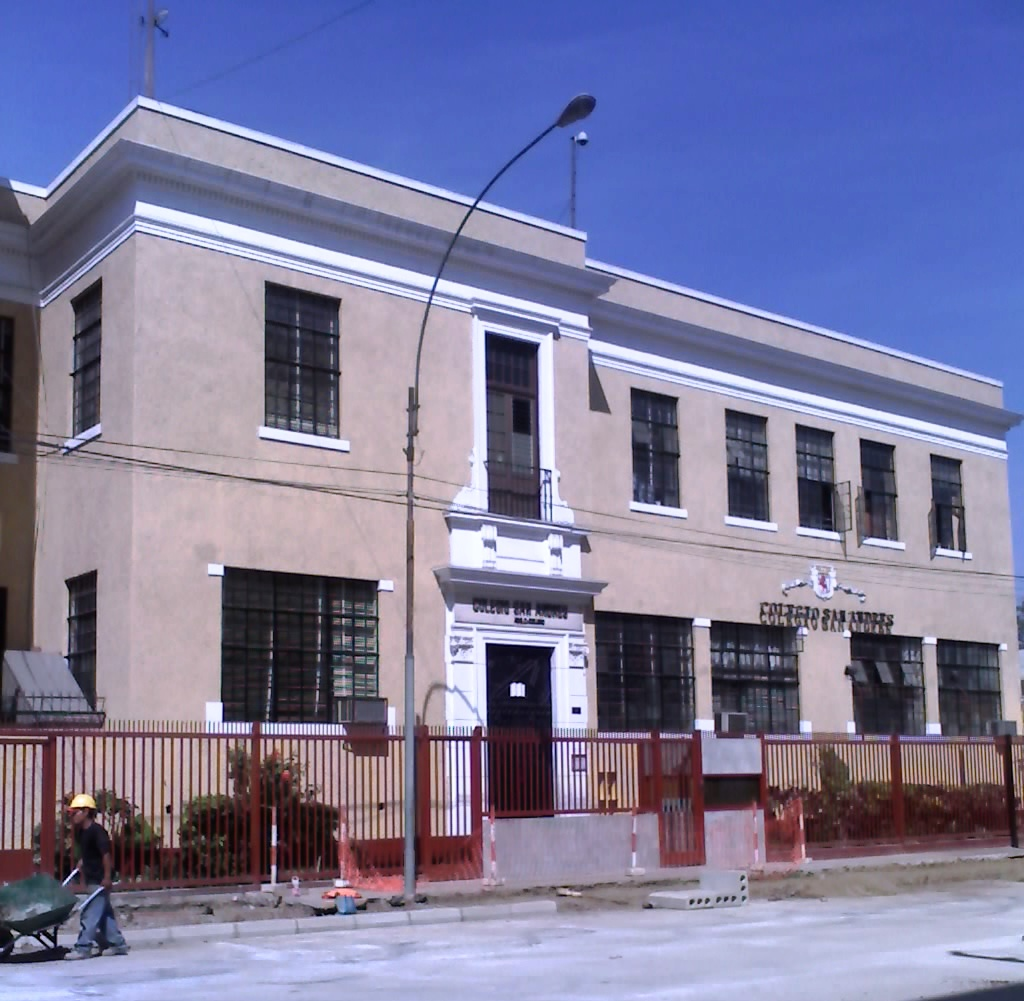

Location
- Petit Thouars 179, Santa Beatriz, Lima

Information
- School type: Private
- Motto: initium sapientae Timor domini (The fear of the Lord is the beginning of knowledge. [Proverbs 1:7])
- Religious affiliation: Free Church of Scotland
- Established: 1917
- Founder: John A. Mackay
- Headmaster: César Morales
- Gender: Co-educational
- Campus type: Urban
- Mascot: British Lion/British kitty
- Yearbook: Leader

Colegio San Andrés, formerly known as the Colegio Anglo-Peruano, is a private school located in Santa Beatriz, a neighbourhood of Lima, Peru.

== History ==
The Anglo-Peruvian School (Escuela Anglo Peruana) was founded on July 13, 1917, by John A. Mackay, a Scottish missionary and educator, as well as an affiliate of the Free Church of Scotland. This followed the repeal of conservative laws that forbid the practice of non-Catholic faiths in the country during the early 20th century. In 1919, the primary school expanded into secondary education as well, changing its name to the Anglo–Peruvian School (Colegio Anglo-Peruano). The school, then located at Cuzco Street, then consisted of 7 teachers and 271 pupils.

In 1924, when the school was still located at its premises at France Square, it merged with the American Institute and became a boys‑only institution. Through the initiative of Dr. W. Stanley Rycroft and with the collaboration of Dr. Alberto Arca Parró, a distinguished teacher at the school, the Leader magazine was founded in 1926. In the words of its first editorial, the Leader aspired to "be the voice of educational development, and be able to unite the voice of teachers and students in the process of development and reinterpretation of the basic principles of teaching."

The school moved to its present site in 1930. The then‑President of Peru, Augusto B. Leguía, was an honoured guest at the occasion. In 1942, in compliance with the dictates of Government Resolution N°3, announced by the Ministry of Education, the school changed its name again, becoming the Colegio San Andrés.

The school was opened to female students in 1994. The class of 2004 was the first coeducational class to graduate.

== Philosophy ==
Since the school was founded under charter from the Free Church of Scotland, the defining ideals of the school are principally derived from the church's philosophy and biblical teachings.

The institution, being a religious institution, teaches all its subjects from a Biblical viewpoint, not only for religion and ethics, but also for all aspects of education.

== Notable people ==
=== Alumni ===
- José Adolph, author awarded an honorary degree in recognition of his contributions to Peruvian culture
- Luis Ernesto Alva y Talledo, tenor
- Luis Felipe Angell de Lama, writer and journalist, better known as Sofocleto
- Félix Antonio Bacigalupo Palomino, scientist
- Alejandro Bisetti Vanderghem, pianist, composer, and musician
- Julio Cotler Dolberg, anthropologist, sociologist and political scientist
- Efraín Goldenberg Schreiber, former Prime Minister and Foreign Minister
- Luis Jiménez Borra, lawyer, educator and politician
- Alexandros Kapelis, pianist
- Humberto Lay Sun, evangelical minister, architect, and politician
- Leslie Lee Crosby, painter
- Salomón Lerner Ghitis, former Prime Minister
- Nicolás Lindley López, 84th President of Peru
- Gustavo R. Paz-Pujalt, scientist and inventor
- Dante Peñaloza Ramella, physician and co-founder of Cayetano Heredia University
- Alfredo Salazar Southwell, pilot of the Peruvian Air Force
- Eduardo Tokeshi, contemporary artist
- Eduardo Moll Wagner, artist, critic and writer
- César Vásquez Bazán, former Minister of Economy

=== Faculty ===
- Alfredo Bryce Echenique, writer
- Víctor Raúl Haya de la Torre, politician
- Herbert Money, Christian educator
- Raúl Porras Barrenechea, diplomat, historian and politician

== See also ==
- British Peruvians
