= José Adolph =

Peruvian author (1933–2008)

José Bernardo Adolph (Stuttgart, 1933 – Lima, 2008) was a Peruvian author of German origin whose life trajectory was shaped by exile, cultural displacement, and intellectual independence. He is widely regarded as one of the earliest and most important Peruvian writers of science fiction.

== Early life and education ==
Adoplh was born in the final months of the Weimar Republic, at a time when political instability was giving way to the rise of Nazi Germany. Due to his family’s Jewish heritage, they were forced to flee persecution. In 1938, his family settled in Peru, initiating his lifelong experience of “uprooting” that would profoundly shape his worldview and literary sensibility.

This condition placed Adolph in a permanent position of cultural marginality. Although he would much later, in 1974, become a naturalized Peruvian citizen, his identity remained marked by a dual perspective: he was both insider and outsider. This tension allowed him to observe Peruvian society with a critical distance, often exposing its contradictions and underlying structures. The sense of estrangement became not only a biographical fact but also a methodological stance that informed his intellectual and creative work.

Adolph’s education took place in Lima, where he attended the Colegio San Andrés. During these formative years, he began contributing to the school magazine Leader, already demonstrating an early concern with themes such as political conflict and social justice. He later enrolled at the National University of San Marcos where he completed his higher education and would eventually be awarded an honorary degree in recognition of his contributions to Peruvian culture.

His youth coincided with the dominance of neorealism in Peruvian literature, particularly among the Generation of the 1950s. While initially influenced by this environment, Adolph gradually distanced himself from the realist canon, turning instead toward genres often considered minor, such as science fiction and the fantastic. This choice marked him as an unconventional figure within the literary field. His intellectual posture was characterized by irony and heterodoxy; he once described himself as a “dissident Zoroastrian,” a formulation that encapsulated his fascination with paradox, dualism, and metaphysical speculation.

== Career ==
Before establishing himself as a major literary figure, Adolph built a substantial career in journalism and criticism. He contributed regularly to prominent Peruvian publications, including Caretas, La República, and Socialismo y Participación. His writings covered a wide range of topics, from political analysis to film and literary criticism, reflecting both his intellectual versatility and his engagement with contemporary cultural debates.

A significant and controversial chapter of his life was his involvement with the military government of Juan Velasco Alvarado, who ruled Peru from 1968 to 1980. Adolph worked in the Department of Agrarian Reform as part of the regime’s Revolutionary Government of the Armed Forces. Unlike many intellectuals who later distanced themselves from this period, Adolph maintained his support for it. This position contributed to his further marginalization within the literary establishment during Peru’s return to democracy, reinforcing his status as an outsider figure.

His literary debut came in 1968 with the publication of El retorno de Aladino, a collection of short stories that announced his distinctive voice. The 1970s marked a period of intense productivity and creative maturity. During these years, he published works such as Hasta que la muerte (1971) and Cuentos del relojero abominable (1973), which established him as a pioneer of science fiction in Peru. His stories frequently reinterpreted historical and biblical events through speculative frameworks; for example, in one narrative, Christopher Columbus’s voyage becomes an uncertain journey through cosmic space.

The culmination of his literary career came with the novel Tomorrow, the Rats (Mañana, las ratas, written in 1977 and published in 1984), widely regarded as the most important Peruvian science fiction novel of the twentieth century. Set in a dystopian Lima of the year 2034, the novel imagines a world in which nation-states have been replaced by a “Corporate Democracy” governed by transnational corporations. Through its protagonist, Tony Tréveris, the work explores themes of social degradation, racism, and the erosion of individual agency under technological and economic control.

In the following decades, Adolph entered a period of stylistic experimentation, producing works that combined psychological, historical, and speculative elements. His novel Dora (1989) revisited his European origins, while Diario del sótano (1996) examined the alienation of urban life. This phase culminated in the ambitious trilogy De mujeres y heridas (2000), which includes Ningún Dios, Especulaciones sobre otro barco, and La profunda maldad del universo. These works deepened his exploration of human relationships, marked by underlying violence.

In the final decade of his life, Adolph experienced a creative resurgence, returning to science fiction with works such as Los fines del mundo (2003) and Un ejército de locos (2003). He continued to engage critically with contemporary issues, particularly the impact of digital technology and what he described as the “Armageddon of the Internet”. Despite receiving more than twenty literary awards, including a major prize from the Municipality of Lima in 1983, he kept of feeling marginalized by academic criticism.

His death prompted widespread recognition of his contributions, and he was remembered as a solitary yet visionary figure in Peruvian letters. His life laid the foundation for a body of work that would later be reassessed as central to the development of modern Peruvian literature.

== Work, style, ideas, and legacy ==
The literary work of José Bernardo Adolph represents a decisive reconfiguration of Peruvian narrative through the integration of speculative genres with philosophical inquiry. His writing is characterized by what critics often describe as an “Adolph formula,” in which death, sex, and politics are inseparably intertwined. These elements function turn into mutually illuminating forces through which he examines both individual existence and collective structures.

Adolph’s style combines apparent simplicity with intellectual density. His prose is clear and direct, yet beneath this surface lies a complex network of ideas. Irony plays a central role in his work, not merely as a rhetorical device but as a fundamental mode of cognition and a defense mechanism that exposes illusions and destabilizes accepted truths. His narratives frequently adopt a skeptical and disenchanted tone, reflecting a worldview marked by deep philosophical pessimism.

Adolph moves fluidly between science fiction, the fantastic, and urban realism, creating a distinctive synthesis that challenges traditional literary hierarchies. In his speculative works, he often imagines futures in which nation-states dissolve into alternative, often threatening systems, where transnational corporations exert control over both economic processes and personal life. These dystopian visions function as critiques of neoliberalism, technological domination, and the fragmentation of social bonds.

History, in Adolph’s writing, becomes a field of reinterpretation. He frequently reimagines historical events through speculative frameworks, revealing hidden dimensions beneath established narratives. This approach reflects his broader interest in the instability of truth and the constructed nature of historical knowledge. His outsider perspective allowed him to approach national history with both distance and critical insight.

At the philosophical core of his work lies a form of cosmic pessimism. Adolph often portrays life as a pathological condition of matter and intelligence as a further complication of that condition. In this framework, moral categories such as good and evil lose their absolute status, appearing instead as provisional constructs developed to navigate an indifferent universe. Human relationships are frequently depicted as fragile and undermined by hidden tensions, while collective existence tends toward forms of decay or collapse.

His narratives also engage critically with the illusion of community or consensus in modern societies. Systems that present themselves as democratic or participatory are often revealed as mechanisms of control, where dialogue serves to mask domination. Individualism, far from being a liberating force, is portrayed as a strategy of atomization that weakens collective resistance. This critical perspective aligns his work with broader traditions of dystopian literature, while extending them into more explicitly philosophical territory.

His novel Mañana, las ratas offers a vision of Lima that is futuristic and rooted in the social realities of Peru.

Despite his prolific output and numerous awards, Adolph remained a marginal figure within the official literary canon for much of his life. This marginalization can be attributed both to the traditional preference for realism in Peruvian criticism and to his controversial political positions. Nevertheless, his work has gained increasing recognition in recent years, as scholars and readers revisit his contributions, discussing his ability to use speculative forms as tools for critical inquiry.

== Works ==
=== Short story collections ===
- El retorno de Aladino (1968)
- Hasta que la muerte (1971)
- Nosotros, No (1983)
- Invisible para las fieras (1972)
- Cuentos del relojero abominable (1973)
- Mañana fuimos felices (1974)
- Un dulce horror (1989)
- Diario del sótano (1996)
- La batalla del café (1984)
- Los fines del mundo (2003)
- Es sólo un viejo tren (2007)
- "El payaso plin plin se pincho la nariz" (2007)

=== Novels ===
- La ronda de los generales (1973)
- Mañana, las ratas (1984)
- Dora (1989)
- De mujeres y heridas (Ningún Dios, Especulaciones sobre otro Barco, La Profunda Maldad del Universo) (2000).
- La Verdad sobre Dios y JBA (2001)
- Un ejército de locos (2003).
- La bandera en alto (2009)
