= Clarence Ray Allen =

American murderer (1930–2006)

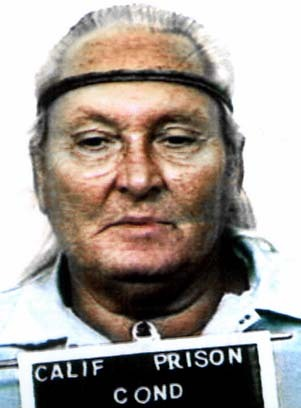
- Born: January 16, 1930; Blair, Oklahoma, U.S.
- Died: January 17, 2006 (aged 76); San Quentin State Prison, California, U.S.
- Resting place: San Quentin Prison Cemetery
- Other names: Ray Allen; Clarence Ray Jr. Junebug
- Years active: 1974–1980
- Spouse(s): Helen Sevier (m. 1947; div. 1963) Darlene Hope (divorced)
- Status: Executed by lethal injection
- Motive: Witness elimination
- Convictions: First degree murder with special circumstances (3 counts); First degree murder Conspiracy to commit murder Conspiracy; Assault with a deadly weapon First degree robbery First degree burglary Attempted robbery
- Penalty: Death

Details
- State: California
- Imprisoned at: San Quentin State Prison

Clarence Ray Allen (January 16, 1930 – January 17, 2006) was an American gang leader and proxy murderer who was executed in 2006 at the age of 76 by lethal injection at San Quentin State Prison for the murders of three people. Allen was the second-oldest inmate at the time to be executed in the United States since 1976.

Throughout the 1970s, Allen organized several armed robberies across California. In 1978, he was convicted for ordering the 1974 murder of his son's teenage girlfriend Mary Sue Kitts for informing others of her involvement in Allen's gang. In 1980, while already serving a life sentence for Kitts' murder, Allen organised the killing of Bryon Schletewitz, as part of a greater murder scheme to eliminate witnesses in the murder. The resulting contract killing became known as the Fran's Market murders, in which Schletewitz and two uninvolved employees were murdered by a recently released convict who was promised payment by Allen.

Allen was found guilty of the three murders in 1982 and sentenced to death. The execution date was pushed back three times for two decades. When a final date was decided in 2005, Allen's lawyers declared that "he presents absolutely no danger at this point, as incapacitated as he is. There's no legitimate state purpose served by executing him. It would be gratuitous punishment." They argued that execution would constitute cruel and unusual punishment due to Allen's advanced age and health conditions, and requested that he be granted clemency by California Governor Arnold Schwarzenegger, which was refused. As of 2026, Allen is the most recent person to be executed in California.

== Early life ==
Clarence Ray Allen, who was known by his middle name, was born in 1930 in Blair in southwest Oklahoma, as the youngest of five children. Since 1988, Allen had claimed Native American heritage, asserting that his mother was part Choctaw and his father part Cherokee; his race was listed as White with correctional authorities and he was not enrolled with the Choctaw Nation.

Allen's family was poor and he began working as a cotton picker at age 11 or 12. In the early 1940s, the family relocated to south Texas, where Allen dropped out of school in the eighth grade, before moving to Fresno, California. At 17, he married Helen Sevier, whom he had met a year earlier while working in the cotton fields of San Joaquin Valley. Around the same time, Allen stole items from the cars of fellow cotton pickers.

Allen and his wife briefly lived in a rented house, described as a "little chicken coop", near Pixley, California. By the mid-1950s, Allen had fathered to two sons, became a born-again Christian deacon, and gained employment at a warehouse for Sunland Olive Company.

== Criminal career ==
In 1962, Allen, by then a warehouse manager, was convicted alongside several subordinates for criminal conspiracy. According to Sunland officials, Allen had formed a criminal ring that stole up to 3,000 cases of olives, which they sold to vegetables stands in the Central Valley area. He served a one-year sentence at the San Joaquin County Honor Farm and after his release, Allen divorced his wife, retaining custody of their two children. Allen subsequently worked as a security guard for a steel plant in Fresno County.

In 1968, Allen founded his own private security company, which saw great success with ranchers amid disputes with the United Farm Workers union. The company grew to 60 employees and had two planes at its disposal. Allen remarried and purchased his own ranch in Sanger, where he raised Thoroughbred and Arabian horses.

Between June 1974 and March 1977, Allen used his position to gather information on clients to commit at least ten armed robberies and burglaries on business and private homes around Central Valley. The criminal group, consisting of some of his security employees, his sons, his extramarital girlfriend, some acquaintances and their adult children, was dubbed the Ray Allen Gang or just Allen Gang, by Allen himself. Allen later claimed connections to the mafia, regularly boasting about personally killing two people in Nevada, carrying a newspaper clipping of the murders around as a scare tactic.

=== Fran's Market burglary and murder of Mary Sue Kitts ===
In June 1974, Allen plotted the burglary of Fran's Market, a supermarket in Sanger owned by Ray and Fran Schletewitz, whom Allen had known for years. The plot involved his youngest son, Roger Allen, as well as Ed Savala, Carl Mayfield, and Charles Jones. Mayfield and Jones worked for Allen in his security guard business as well as part of a burglary enterprise allegedly operated by Allen.

Allen arranged for someone to steal a set of door and alarm keys from the market owner's son, Bryon Schletewitz, while Schletewitz was swimming in Allen's pool. Allen then arranged a date between Schletewitz and Mary Sue Kitts (his son Roger's 17-year-old girlfriend) for the evening, during which time the burglary took place. The burglary netted $500 (equivalent to $3,264 in 2025) in cash and $10,000 (equivalent to $65,283 in 2025) in money orders from the store's safe.

Following the commission of the burglary, Kitts told Bryon Schletewitz that Allen had committed the crime, which she knew as she had helped Allen cash the stolen money orders at various malls in southern California using false identification.

Schletewitz confronted Roger Allen and informed him that he had been told of the crime by Kitts. Roger Allen told his father, Ray, who said that Schletewitz and Kitts would have to be "dealt with." He enlisted three employees of his security firm, Charles Jones, Carl Mayfield and Eugene "Lee" Furrow. According to an opinion filed on May 6, 2004, in the Ninth Circuit Court of Appeals:

Allen called a meeting at his house and told Jones, Mayfield, and Furrow that Kitts had been talking too much and should be killed. Allen called for a vote on the issue of Kitts's execution. The vote was unanimous because those present feared what would happen if they did not go along with Allen's plan. Allen had previously told his criminal accomplices that he would kill snitches and that he had friends and connections to do the job for him even if he were in prison. He had also referred to himself as a Mafia hitman and stated that the "secret witness program" was useless because a good lawyer could always discover an informant's name and address. Allen kept a newspaper article about the murder of a man and woman in Nevada, and claimed he had "blown them in half" with a shotgun.

Although he ultimately did not harm Bryon Schletewitz or his parents and continued to feign innocence, Allen claimed that someone was planning to burn down their house, later paying Eugene "Lee" Furrow $50 to fire several gunshots outside their home.

In August 1974, Allen ordered Lee Furrow to murder Kitts. He also had Charles Jones, Carl Mayfield and Shirley Doeckel aid in the preparation of the murder. Allen had the others vote whether they agreed with his plan, although those involved later claimed that they only voiced support for fear of being killed by Allen, who had previously threatened to "kill snitches" and that others would fulfill such orders even if he were imprisoned. After an unsuccessful attempt to poison her with cyanide capsules, supplied by Furrow and Mayfield, at a staged party at Doeckel's home, Allen called Furrow to learn if he had killed Kitts. Furrow told Allen he was in the process of strangling her and Allen replied, "do it." After killing Kitts, Furrow weighed down her body with stones from Allen's backyard before dumping it into the Friant-Kern Canal. The body has never been found. Afterwards, Allen ordered his daughter-in-law Kathy to call the Schletewitz family, impersonate Mary Sue Kitts, and claim to be pregnant with Bryon's child to discourage them from calling police about Kitts' disappearance.

According to court records, Allen said he would not hesitate to kill any other "snitches". In 1977, he told two new members, Allen Robinson and Benjamin Meyer, that he had previously "had a broad helping them who got mouthy so they had to waste her" and that "she sleeps with the fishes." He then gave Meyer a warning.

"If you bring anybody in my house that snitches on me or my family, I'll waste them. There's no rock, bush, nothing, he could hide behind..."

=== Other robberies and arrest ===
Allen's gang committed another eight robberies, beginning only days after Kitts' murder. The gang's first armed robbery took place on August 12, 1974, when $18,000 (equivalent to $117,510 in 2025) worth of jewelry were stolen from a safe at the Safina Jewelry Store. On September 4, 1974, the Allen Gang held up Don's Hillside Inn in Porterville, stealing $3,600 (equivalent to $23,502 in 2025) from the hotel earnings and several hundred dollars worth in cash and credit cards from patrons. On February 12, 1975, elderly couple William and Ruth Cross were robbed at gunpoint in their Fresno home and forced to hand over a coin collection worth $100,000 (equivalent to $598,330 in 2025).

Subsequent robberies were less successful. On June 18, 1975, Allen was arrested after an attempted armed robbery at Wickes Forest Products in Fresno. Charges against Allen were dropped after the chief prosecution witness refused to testify following death threats by Allen against the family of the witness. During the October 21, 1976 robbery of Skagg's Drug Store in Bakersfield, a member of the Allen Gang, Raoul Lopez, accidentally shot himself and during a later robbery at a Lucky's store in Sacramento on November 20, Lopez shot clerk Lee McBride, who suffered permanent nerve damage. The Allen Gang stole $16,000 (equivalent to $85,008 in 2025) from a K-Mart in Tulare on February 10, 1977, and during the last proven robbery on a K-Mart in Visalia on March 16, Larry Green shot employee John Atteberry in the chest, leaving him permanently disabled.

After the failed Visalia robbery, Allen and his associates, including Lee Furrow, were arrested. In summer 1977, Allen, along with accomplices Roger Allen and Alan Robinson, was first convicted of robbery, attempted robbery, and assault with a deadly weapon, the latter after an attempted murder charge was downgraded as intent to kill could not be proven. That same year, Furrow confessed to the murder of Mary Kitts, implicating Allen. On March 16, 1978, Allen was convicted of first degree murder, burglary, and conspiracy to commit murder and received a life sentence. Furrow, who said Allen threatened to kill him as well if he didn't murder Mary, pleaded guilty to a reduced charge of second degree murder. As of 2022, the case remains the only murder conviction without a body in Fresno County history.

=== Fran’s Market murders ===
Allen conspired with fellow inmate Billy Ray Hamilton while in Folsom Prison to murder the eight witnesses who had testified against him: Lee Furrow, Barbara Carrasco, Benjamin Meyer, Charles Jones, Carl Mayfield, Shirley Doeckel, and Ray and Bryon Schletewitz. Allen told Hamilton of Schletewitz's workplace as the first target and that in return for his service, Allen offered Hamilton $25,000 (equivalent to $97,688 in 2025) as well as "guns and transportation", saying he was also free to take money from the store, both to stage the killing as a robbery and as a form of payment to Hamilton. Allen was motivated both by a desire to "retaliate" against the witnesses for their role in his conviction and to ensure that there would be no testimony from them should his appeals to retrial be successful. About a month after the agreement, Hamilton was paroled from Folsom Prison on July 28, or August 29, 1980.

Hamilton received money to travel to Fresno by Allen's eldest son Kenneth, who had received instructions from his father via mail. At Kenneth's home, Hamilton was told to kill Bryon and Ray Schletewitz, but that another target, Ray Allen's ex-girlfriend Shirley Doeckel, was off-limits for now as they needed her to get the location of the remaining witnesses. Hamilton told his girlfriend, Connie Barbo, of the contract killing job. Barbo would boast to friends in the days leading up to the murders that she had the opportunity to receive "a few thousands" in cash and "a few hundred" in "crank" for "snuffing out a life". Hamilton and Barbo originally planned to commit the murders of the Schletewitzes on September 4, when they received their firearms, a sawed-off shotgun and a .32 revolver, from Kenneth, but Barbo convinced her boyfriend to wait for the next day as she did not want to go through with the killings yet after seeing a 15-year-old Mexican boy inside the store that evening. Before heading off to Fran's Market for a second and final time, Hamilton received additional ammunition for both guns.

On September 5, 1980, at about 8 p.m., Hamilton, armed with the shotgun, and Barbo, armed with the revolver, went to Fran's Market. 27-year-old Bryon Schletewitz was working inside but his father Ray was not. As it was nearly closing time, no patrons were inside and Schletewitz was only accompanied by three teenage employees. After Hamilton bought meat from the counter, he waited until the front entrance was locked. While two employees, Joe Rios and 18-year-old Douglas White, were in the stockroom, Hamilton and Barbo pulled out their weapons and forced the remaining employees, Schletewitz and 17-year-old Josephine Rocha, into the stockroom as well and ordered them all to lie on the ground. While Barbo kept watch in the stockroom, Hamilton first took White to the freezer, claiming he "knew" about a hidden safe there, but was informed by White that there wasn't one. White was returned and Hamilton called out for "Briant", with Bryon Schletewitz identifying himself, handing over his keys, and promising Hamilton all the store's earnings.

Hamilton took Schletewitz to the freezer and shot him in the forehead. Hamilton returned to the other hostages and again demanded that White show him the safe. When White reiterated that there was no safe, Hamilton killed White with a shotgun blast to the chest and neck at point-blank range before fatally shooting Rocha when she began crying. Rios had managed to flee into the restroom, but he was found and shot twice by Hamilton. Rios survived because he was able to shield his face with his elbow, but he was believed dead by both Hamilton and Barbo, who only checked the other victims for life signs.

Hamilton and Barbo fled through the front door, but were spotted by an armed next-door neighbor, Jack Abbott, who had overheard the gunfire. Hamilton and Abbott exchanged fire while Barbo fled back into the store's bathroom. Abbott was wounded, but managed to shoot Hamilton in the foot as he ran for his car. While Hamilton managed to flee, Barbo was arrested at the scene.

Kenneth Allen and Hamilton met a final time to switch vehicles, after which Hamilton fled to Modesto to live with Gary Brady, a fellow recently released convict. Hamilton told Brady how he had "done robbery" and "killed three people for Ray", whom he also called "the old man". While living with Brady and his wife, Hamilton wrote to Ray Allen for payment, listing the Brady address in the letter. Five days after the events at Fran's Market, Hamilton was arrested while attempting to rob a liquor store across the street from the Brady apartment. On his person was found a "hit list" with the names and addresses of the witnesses who testified against Allen at his trial for Kitts' murder.

== Second murder trial and death sentence ==
In 1980, the California Attorney General filed charges against Allen and prosecuted the trial in Glenn County, California, due to a change of venue. The trial took place in 1982 and lasted 23 days, and 58 witnesses were called to testify. Ultimately, the jury convicted Allen of triple murder and conspiracy to murder eight witnesses.

Special circumstances made Allen eligible for the death penalty; the jury found that Allen had previously been convicted of murder, had committed multiple murders, and had murdered witnesses in retaliation for their prior testimony and to prevent future testimony. During a seven-day penalty phase, the Attorney General introduced evidence of Allen's career orchestrating violent robberies in the Central Valley, including ten violent crimes and six prior felony convictions for first degree murder, assault with a deadly weapon, first degree robbery, first degree burglary, and attempted robbery.

Allen was convicted of three counts of first degree murder with special circumstances and sent to California's death row at San Quentin State Prison on December 2, 1982.

=== Accomplices ===
A jury convicted Billy Hamilton, 32 at the time of the murders, of three counts of murder, one count of attempted robbery and two counts of assault with a deadly weapon. Hamilton was eligible for the death penalty under California's special circumstances law; the jury found that Hamilton had committed murder-robbery, and multiple murders predicated on the killing of other victims. The jury returned a unanimous verdict of death, and the Contra Costa County Superior Court sentenced Hamilton on March 2, 1981. He was imprisoned on San Quentin Prison's death row and died of cancer in 2007 at a Bakersfield hospital.

Connie Barbo, 33 at the time of the murders, was convicted on February 19, 1982, and given a life sentence without the possibility of parole, plus four years imprisonment. Barbo filed for clemency in 2012, which was opposed by the Fresno County District Attorney's office.

Kenneth Allen, who had been arrested five days after the Fran's Market murders on unrelated drug charges, offered testimony in regards to Hamilton in exchange for protective custody. He was given a life sentence without the possibility of parole, as part of a plea bargain that allowed Kenneth to skip trial. During his father's trial for the murders, the defense argued that Kenneth had planned the killings, with Kenneth's wife Kathy characterizing him as the "drug-crazed, hallucinogenic mastermind".

== Appeals ==
In 1987, the California Supreme Court affirmed Allen's death sentence. At the time of the verdict, California had not executed prisoners since 1967. Associate Justice Joseph Grodin's opinion referred to Allen's crimes as "sordid events" with an "extraordinarily massive amount" of aggravating evidence. In a dissenting opinion, California Supreme Court Justice Broussard stated that the prosecutor influenced the jury by telling them that "if you conclude that aggravating evidence outweighs the mitigating evidence, you shall return a death sentence," while the law does not mandate a death sentence in such a situation. According to Justice Broussard, this led to a lack of freedom for the jury to make a "normative decision".

In 2005, the U.S. Ninth Circuit Court of Appeals found that Allen's trial counsel had been inadequate, and the evidence against him was largely the testimony of Allen's several accomplices, who painted him as the mastermind who forced them by threats and scare tactics to commit robberies and murders. However the court denied rehearing in Allen's case. In her opinion for the panel, Judge Kim McLane Wardlaw concluded:

Evidence of Allen's guilt is overwhelming. Given the nature of his crimes, sentencing him to another life term would achieve none of the traditional purposes underlying punishment. Allen continues to pose a threat to society, indeed to those very persons who testified against him in the Fran's Market triple-murder trial here at issue, and has proven that he is beyond rehabilitation. He has shown himself more than capable of arranging murders from behind bars. If the death penalty is to serve any purpose at all, it is to prevent the very sort of murderous conduct for which Allen was convicted.

Deputy California Attorney General Ward Campbell stated in an interview:

Well, Mr. Allen has cited his age, the length of time on death row, claims about innocence, errors at his trial. We found and told the governor we found all those reasons to be unpersuasive given the nature of his crime, which was in fact a direct attack on the criminal justice system perpetrated by a man whom Society thought to be safe from. They thought they were safe from him because he was behind bars and yet he continued to perpetrate these types of crimes and none of the factors that they cite now overshadow or outbalance those reasons for now executing the judgment of the people of the state of California.

On January 13, 2006, California Governor Arnold Schwarzenegger refused to grant Allen clemency, stating that "his conduct did not result from youth or inexperience, but instead resulted from the hardened and calculating decisions of a mature man." Schwarzenegger also cited a poem in which Allen glorified his actions, where Allen wrote, "We rob and steal and for those who squeal are usually found dying or dead."

On January 15, 2006, the Ninth Circuit Court of Appeals denied Allen's claim that executing an aged or infirm person was cruel and unusual punishment, observing that his mental acuity was unimpaired and that he had been fifty years of age when he arranged the murders from prison. Judge Kim Wardlaw writing for the panel of judges Susan Graber, Richard Clifton, and herself:

His age and experience only sharpened his ability to coldly calculate the execution of the crime. Nothing about his current ailments reduces his culpability and thus they do not lessen the retributive or deterrent purposes of the death penalty.

The United States Supreme Court declined to hear the case, albeit over the dissent of Justice Stephen Breyer, who stated: "I believe that in the circumstances he raises a significant question as to whether his execution would constitute 'cruel and unusual punishment.'"

Allen was described as being unable to walk, legally blind, hard of hearing, and as having heart disease and diabetes. Allen's blindness was reported to have been the result of his diabetes and he would wear a pair of sunglasses bequeathed to him by fellow death row inmate Stephen Wayne Anderson, following the latter's execution in 2002. On September 2, 2005, shortly before the final upholding of his death sentence, Allen had a heart attack and had to be revived following cardiac arrest. Correctional officers familiar with Allen later stated that while he was on death row, he often walked without assistance and alleged that he was not blind, as he was able to read his mail.

== Execution ==
Allen was executed by lethal injection on January 17, 2006, less than a day after his 76th birthday, at California's San Quentin State Prison. He became the second-oldest inmate to be executed in the United States since 1976 (John B. Nixon of Mississippi was executed in 2005 at age 77). He remains the most recently executed inmate in California as of March 2019 when the imposition of the death penalty was suspended in the state by Governor Gavin Newsom.

Allen was assisted in the death chamber by four correctional officers, though a media observer stated that he was clearly moving under his own power. To the surprise of everyone present, the warden indicated that he needed an additional potassium chloride injection in order to stop his surprisingly healthy heart. Allen died at 12:38 a.m., with the execution taking 33 minutes. Allen wrote in his final statement, which Warden Steven Ornoski read immediately following the execution.

"First of all I'd like to say how good the last meal was, how much I enjoyed it and how much I love my family and friends who have stood by me all these years. I’d also like to thank my friends from Europe who have written to me and my spiritual advisor Richard Williams, one lady, Henny Ripp from Holland, and another lady from Italy, Christine Kaufmann, who I gave an Indian name of Morning Sun, and she's been that to me, and all of the inmates on death row that I’m leaving behind that they will be joining me one day. One good friend I've got that I hate to leave behind who's been my neighbor for 20 years is Ward Weaver. And all of my family that was here to visit me during this period, I love you very much for being with me during this time. My last words will be 'Hoka Hey, it's a good day to die.' Thank you very much. I love you all. Goodbye."

Allen died with an eagle feather on his chest. He was wearing a medicine bag around his neck, and a beaded headband. He was visited shortly before the execution by two Native American spiritual advisers.

Approximately 250 death penalty opponents gathered for a candlelight vigil outside the walls of San Quentin. His last meal consisted of buffalo steak and frybread (both are traditional Native American dishes) as well as a bucket of KFC white-meat-only chicken, sugar-free pecan pie, sugar-free black walnut ice cream, and whole milk.

== Purported involvement in other crimes ==
While in the Fresno County Jail on June 27, 1981, Allen called a "death penalty" vote for fellow inmate Glenn Bell, accused of child molestation, and directed an attack in which inmates scalded the target inmate with two gallons of hot water, tied him to the cell bars and beat him, shot him with a zip gun (a type of improvised firearm), and threw razor blades and excrement at him; Bell survived with injuries. While another inmate, John Plemons, took credit for the assault during Allen's appeal process, correctional officer Delma Graves had identified Allen as the instigating force immediately after the incident.

=== 1983 Chino Hills murders ===
In June 1983, Douglas and Peggy Ryen, their 10-year-old daughter Jessica, and an 11-year-old neighbor, Christopher Hughes, were all murdered in an stabbing attack in Chino Hills. Ray Allen previously had a disagreement with the family over a horse he had purchased from them. Kevin Cooper was convicted of the murders, but a girlfriend of Eugene "Lee" Furrow, convicted of murder in the Kitts case and on parole at the time of the attacks, claimed Furrow had been the killer. Furrow denied involvement and provided a DNA sample. In 2018, outgoing California Governor Jerry Brown ordered new DNA testing in the Cooper case. The independent investigation argued that results from the testing concluded that no DNA evidence points to any person other than Kevin Cooper, though in 2023, President of the American Bar Association Mary Smith expressed skepticism of the investigation, arguing that their failure to review undisclosed documents made it impossible to have confidence in the verdict.

== See also ==
- Capital punishment debate
- Capital punishment in California
- Capital punishment in the United States
- List of most recent executions by jurisdiction
- List of people executed in California
- List of people executed in the United States in 2006

== Notes ==
Preceded by Stanley Tookie Williams	Executions carried out in California	Succeeded by None
