= John A. Mackay =

Scottish missionary

The Reverend John A. Mackay
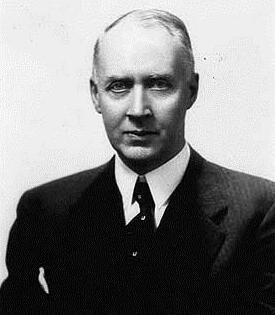
- Title: President, Princeton Theological Seminary; Founder, Theology Today

Personal life
- Born: May 17, 1889 Inverness, Scotland, United Kingdom
- Died: June 9, 1983 (aged 94) Hightstown, New Jersey, United States

Religious life
- Religion: Presbyterian

Senior posting
- Based in: Lima, Peru; Montevideo, Uruguay; Princeton, New Jersey

John A. Mackay (May 17, 1889 – June 9, 1983) was a Presbyterian theologian, missionary, and educator. He was a strong advocate of the Ecumenical Movement and World Christianity.

== Early life and education ==
John A. Mackay was born on May 17, 1889, in Inverness, Scotland, the eldest of five children. The family attended the Free Presbyterian Church, a very small denomination. At the age of 14 at a communion service at Rogart, Scotland, Mackay had a profound religious experience that influenced the remainder of his life.

As a youth he attended the Inverness Royal Academy, where he was a good student, winning several academic prizes upon graduation in 1907. Mackay then studied philosophy and logic at the University of Aberdeen, leaving for a time to pursue theological studies for the Free Presbyterian Church ministry. He returned to Aberdeen to complete his honors degree which he received in 1913. That same year Mackay crossed the Atlantic and enrolled at Princeton Theological Seminary. When he was graduated in 1915, he won a fellowship in didactic and polemic theology, which he used toward studies in Spanish culture at Madrid, Spain, to prepare for missionary work in Latin America.

== Mission Field ==
In 1916 Mackay and Jane Logan Wells, who had been recently married, sailed to Peru where they founded a school, Colegio Anglo Peruano, in Lima, Peru, under the auspices of the Free Church of Scotland. The school was a center for progressive ideas during a period when social and educational reforms were sweeping through Latin America. Haya de la Torre, a political leader in Latin America, taught at the school. The mission also started a mission station at Cajamarca in the northern Peru.

From his position as school master, Mackay entered intellectual circles and became a member of a literary group that included Victor Andres Belaunde, Professor of Philosophy at San Marcos University. Francisco Garcia Calderon Rey and his brother, Ventura, were the group's European correspondents. Five members were corresponding members of the Spanish Academy. In 1925 Mackay was appointed to the Chair of Modern Philosophy at San Marcos and also accepted the chair in Metaphysics.

In 1926 the Colegio was sufficiently rooted to survive without his leadership. Mackay joined the Y.M.C.A. as an evangelist and religious teacher moving his family to Montevideo, Uruguay, where the Y.M.C.A. operated a leadership institute. During the next seven and one-half years, he traveled widely through Chile, Brazil, and Argentina as an evangelistic speaker. He attended the Jerusalem Conference of 1928 and traveled extensively in Europe during his furlough in 1930. From April to July 1930 Mackay and his family lived in Bonn, Germany where he attended the lectures of Karl Barth and began a friendship with him. Under the auspices of the Y.M.C.A. Mackay made many significant addresses in Mexico during the revolutionary period of religious persecution, including an address to over 2,000 men and women in the largest theatre in the town of Chihuahua. Over the years he was invited to speak at 35 Latin American universities.

== North American educator ==
In 1936, Mackay reluctantly left the foreign mission field to become the third president of Princeton Theological Seminary which had recently been weakened by the secession of several professors, including his own former teacher, J. Gresham Machen. For the next 24 years as both president and professor of ecumenics, Mackay worked on many fronts to revive the institution's health, inspiring it to evangelical dynamism and leaving it on a sound footing, with expanded faculty, student body, and campus plant. In 1944, Mackay founded the journal Theology Today to provide insights "into the life of man in the light of God". The editorial board included Robert Elliott Speer, Richard Niebuhr, and J. Harvey Cotton. By 1952 Theology Today was the most widely distributed religious quarterly in the world. After retirement from the seminary, he served from 1961 to 1964 as adjunct professor of Hispanic thought at American University, Washington, D.C.

== Church leader ==
An eloquent and charismatic platform speaker and preacher, Mackay was often called upon to present keynote addresses at conferences, assemblies, and gatherings. As the holder of leadership roles in church organizations, his constituency included tens of millions of Christians. Five leadership roles were particularly significant, the presidency of the Presbyterian Board of Foreign Missions from 1944 to 1951, after which he continued serving as a member of the Mission Board; membership on the Provisional Committee of the World Council of Churches in 1946 and from 1948 membership on the Central Committee of the World Council of Churches; the chairmanship of the International Missionary Council from January 1, 1948, to 1958; membership on the executive committee of the World Alliance of Reformed Churches and from 1954 the presidency of its executive committee; and moderator of the 165th General Assembly of the Presbyterian Church, USA, 1953–1954.

These leadership roles gave Mackay platforms that enhanced his spiritual influence and authority. In addition to writing the influential "Letter to Presbyterians", which fortified resistance to McCarthyism in the United States, Mackay was also the primary draftsman of a number of other church statements and messages on behalf of various ecclesiastical councils and conferences.

Although known primarily for his mission work in Latin America, Mackay worked to advance World Christianity through travels and at conferences in Asia, Europe, and Africa. These included the Eastern Asia Christian Conference in Bangkok in 1949, the Asia Study Conference in Lucknow, India in 1952, the All Africa Church Conference, Ibadan, Nigeria, 1958, and the Joseph Cook Lectureship which took him around the world during, 1960–1961.

Thus, as a fellow Presbyterian leader correctly concluded, Mackay exerted influential leadership in three broad areas: Missions, the Ecumenical Movement, and social and political thought and action.

== Missionary and ecumenical ideas ==
Mackay strongly emphasized sensitivity to and experience of the reality of God in Christ and authentic conscious experience of life in Christian community. Frequently asked to preach, his sermons called for response on the part of his hearers. Mackay wrote devotional literature in English and Spanish. He believed in a personal and incarnational approach to foreign missions by which the missionary would become a member of the community and earn the right to be heard through particular service that met specific needs within the receiving culture. These might include the demonstration of authentic Christianity in action through educational, medical, or agricultural service. This gift of service offered a platform through which the missionary could effectively proclaim the faith that he held.

At the Oxford Conference on Church and State in 1937, Mackay coined the phrase that became the byword of the conference, "Let the Church be the Church." He yearned for the Church "to become in its historical existence the dynamic instrument of God's will, which it actually was in its eternal essence," He influenced historical development within the ecumenical movement by his strong advocacy, as at the Central Committee meeting of the World Council of Churches at Rolle in August, 1951. For him "the church is the fellowship of those for whom Jesus Christ is Lord." He believed the Church was truly the Church when it was a missionary Church, and he worked to bring into balance the Church universal, the Una Sancta, with confessional movements within various faith traditions. Mackay advocated visible unity of the Church. His high Christology also stressed a unity of spirit with a diversity of treasures from the various Christian traditions. In this way Mackay helped to lay the foundation for spiritual ecumenism among fellow Christians across denominational lines. Travelling in Chile in 1965 Mackay agreed with Fr. Juan Ochagaria, dean of the Catholic University of Chile's faculty of theology, that the task of both Catholics and Presbyterians is to "make Christians."

In 1964 in Lima, Mackay was presented with the Palmas Magisteriales, a civic honor and the highest government award for educational services to Peru.

In his final years Mackay moved to a Presbyterian retirement community in Hightstown, New Jersey, and died early on June 9, 1983. Coincidentally, the General Assembly of his denomination voted to join the Southern Presbyterian Church later that same morning. It would have pleased Mackay because he had worked for many years for the reunion of the Northern and Southern Presbyterian Churches.

Each of the Mackays' three daughters married Presbyterian clergyman, and their son, Duncan Alexander Duff Mackay, named for the Scottish Free Church missionary to India, Alexander Duff, was an active layman and elder, while working for the U.S. Foreign Service and later the Inter-American Development Bank.

== See also ==
- Colegio San Andrés
- Religion in Scotland

== Selected writings by John A. Mackay ==
- Don Miguel de Unamuno: Su personalidad, obra e influencia (1919).
- La Profesiόn de Hombre (1921) Los Intelectuales y los Tiempos Nuevos (1923) Más Yo Os Digo (1927). A los Pies del Maestro (1930).
- El Sentido de la Vida (1931)
- The Other Spanish Christ (1932)
- That Other America (1935)
- A Preface to Christian Theology (1942)
- Heritage and Destiny (1943)
- Christianity on the Frontier (1950).
- God's Order The Ephesian Letter and this Present Time (1953)
- The Presbyterian Way of Life (1960)
- Ecumenics The Science of the Church Universal (1964)
- His Life and Our Life (1964).
- Christian Reality & Appearance (1969)
- Realidad e Idolatria en el Cristianismo Contemporaneo (1970)
- The Meaning of Life (2014)

== Writings about John A. Mackay ==
- John Mackay Metzger, The Hand and the Road: The Life and Times of John A. Mackay (Louisville, Kentucky: Westminster John Knox Press, 2010).
- James H. Moorhead, Princeton Seminary in American Religion and Culture (Grand Rapids, MI: Eerdmans, 2012), 370–421; 422–457.
- Hugh T. Kerr, "John A. Mackay: An Appreciation," in The Ecumenical Era in Church and Society A Symposium in Honor of John A. Mackay, edited by Edward J. Jurji (New York: The Macmillan Company: 1959), 1–17.
- K. Stephen Parmelee, "The Presbyterian Letter Against McCarthyism," Journal of Presbyterian History, vol. 41, no. 4 (December 1963), 201–223.
- H. McKennie Goodpasture, "The Latin American Soul of John A. Mackay," Journal of Presbyterian History, vol. 48, no. 4 (Winter 1970), 265–292.
- Robert R. Curlee and Mary Ruth Isaac-Curlee, "Bridging the Gap: John A. Mackay, Presbyterians and the Charismatic Movement," Journal of Presbyterian History, vol. 72, no. 3 (Fall 1994), 141–156.
- "John A. Mackay: Influences on my Life," Journal of Presbyterian History, vol. 56, no. 1 (Spring 1978), 20–34.
- Theology Today, vol. 16, no. 3 (October, 1959), 319–375.
- Princeton Seminary Bulletin, In Honor of John Alexander Mackay, vol. 52, no. 4 (May 1959), 3–29.
- Luis Alberto Sánchez, "John Mackay y la Educatión Peruana," Leader, vol. 48, no. 46 (Lima, December, 1973), 63–70.
- John M. MacPherson, At the Roots of a Nation (Edinburgh: The Knox Press: 1993). The history of Colegio Anglo Peruana, Lima, Peru.

== Literature ==
- Christof Mauch (1993). "John Alexander Mackay". In Bautz, Traugott (ed.). Biographisch-Bibliographisches Kirchenlexikon (BBKL) (in German). Vol. 5. Herzberg: Bautz. cols. 537–538. ISBN 3-88309-043-3.

Religious titles
Preceded by The Rev. Hermann Nelson Morse	Moderator of the 165th General Assembly of the Presbyterian Church in the United States of America; 1953–1954	Succeeded by The Rev. Ralph Waldo Lloyd
