= Eduardo Tokeshi =

Eduardo Tokeshi Namizato (born August 12, 1960, in Lima, Peru) is a contemporary Peruvian artist.

Eduardo Tokeshi was born on August 12, 1960, in Lima. His parents are Sara Namizato and Victor Tokeshi; he has one brother Jorge (b. 1957) and one sister Marisa (b. 1958). Okinawan Peruvian, he lived in Lima and studied at the America School of La Victoria and then in Colegio San Andrés (formerly named as Anglo-Peruvian School).

He is a graduate of the Faculty of Art of the Pontificia Universidad Católica del Perú in 1992.

In his work, Tokeshi often combines both colonial and modern imagery. Tokeshi has represented Peru in multiple cultural events abroad such as the Bienal de São Paulo and the Biennial of art of Havana.
