= Theology Today =

- Discipline: Religion
- Language: English
- Edited by: Gordon S. Mikoski

Publication details
- History: 1944-present
- Publisher: SAGE Publications
- Frequency: Quarterly

Standard abbreviations
- ISO 4: Theol. Today

Indexing
- ISSN: 0040-5736 (print); 2044-2556 (web)
- LCCN: 47020879
- OCLC no.: 730775639

Links
- Journal homepage; Online access; Online archive

Theology Today is an academic journal published by SAGE Publications for the Princeton Theological Seminary; it was formerly published by Westminster John Knox. It appears four times a year.

The first issue of Theology Today appeared in April, 1944. The lead editorial, "Our Aims," by founder and editor John A. Mackay, President of Princeton Theological Seminary, set forth the aims of the journal as adopted by its Editorial Council. These were:

1. "To contribute to the restoration of theology in the world of today as the supreme science, of which both religion and culture stand in need for their renewal."
2. "To study the central realities of Christian faith and life, and to set forth their meaning in clear and appropriate language."
3. "To explore afresh the truths which were rediscovered by the Protestant Reformation, especially the tradition usually called Reformed, and to show their relevancy to the contemporary problems of the Church and society."
4. "To provide an organ in which Christians whose faith is rooted in the revelation of God in the Bible and in Jesus Christ, and who are engaged in different spheres of intellectual activity, may combine their insights into the life of man in the light of God, with a view to interpreting our human situation and developing a Christian philosophy of life."

After seven years the journal "achieved an established place in the world of religious thought", and Hugh Thomson Kerr assumed the role of editor as Mackay became Chairman of the Editorial Council.

Changes continued over the years. F.W. Dillistone, a long serving member of the Editorial Council, discussed new emphases and developments confronting theologians that occurred during his tenure. Among other issues he noted the collapse of barriers brought about by Vatican II, and that the editorial board included Roman Catholic Scholars. Catholic writers and reviewers regularly contributed to Theology Today.

Presently, the journal is edited by Gordon S. Mikoski (Princeton Theological Seminary).
