= Billy Ray Hamilton =

American convicted murderer

Billy Ray Hamilton (a.k.a. "Country") (January 31, 1949 – October 22, 2007) was an American convicted murderer who conspired with Clarence Ray Allen to murder eight witnesses to a crime committed by Allen in 1974. Hamilton, who was serving a 4-year sentence for robbery, met Allen in Folsom Prison in 1979. Allen befriended Hamilton and offered to pay him $25,000 to carry out the murders. At Folsom Prison, Allen used to refer to Hamilton as his "good dog", though at the time of Allen's trial, he claimed to only have met Hamilton three or four times.

After Hamilton was paroled from Folsom Prison, Kenneth Allen, one of Allen's sons supplied Hamilton with $100. Hamilton and his girlfriend Connie Barbo went to Fran's Market in Fresno, California where one of the witnesses, Bryon Schletewitz worked. On September 5, 1980, Hamilton murdered Schletewitz and fellow employees Josephine Rocha, 17, and Douglas White, 18, with a sawn-off shotgun and wounded two other people, Joe Rios and Jack Abbott. Hamilton shot Schletewitz at near point-blank range in the forehead and murdered Rocha and White after forcing them to lie on the ground within the store. A neighbor, Jack Abbott, who heard the shotgun blasts came to investigate and was shot by Hamilton. Abbott returned fire and wounded Hamilton, who escaped from the scene.

Five days after the events at Fran's Market, Hamilton was arrested shortly after robbing a liquor store in Modesto, California. Hamilton carried a list with the names and addresses of the witnesses who testified against Allen at the Kitts trial, including the name of Schletewitz. Hamilton was tried in Contra Costa County, California. The jury convicted Hamilton of three counts of murder, one count of attempted robbery and two counts of assault with a deadly weapon. As special circumstances making Hamilton eligible for the death penalty, the jury found that Hamilton had committed murder-robbery, and multiple murders predicated on the killing of other victims. The jury returned a unanimous verdict of death, and the Contra Costa County Superior Court sentenced Hamilton on March 2, 1981.

Hamilton was on death row at San Quentin State Prison in California where he died from cancer on October 22, 2007 at the age of 58.

== See also ==
- List of United States death row inmates
