= Alexandros Kapelis =

Greek-Peruvian classical pianist

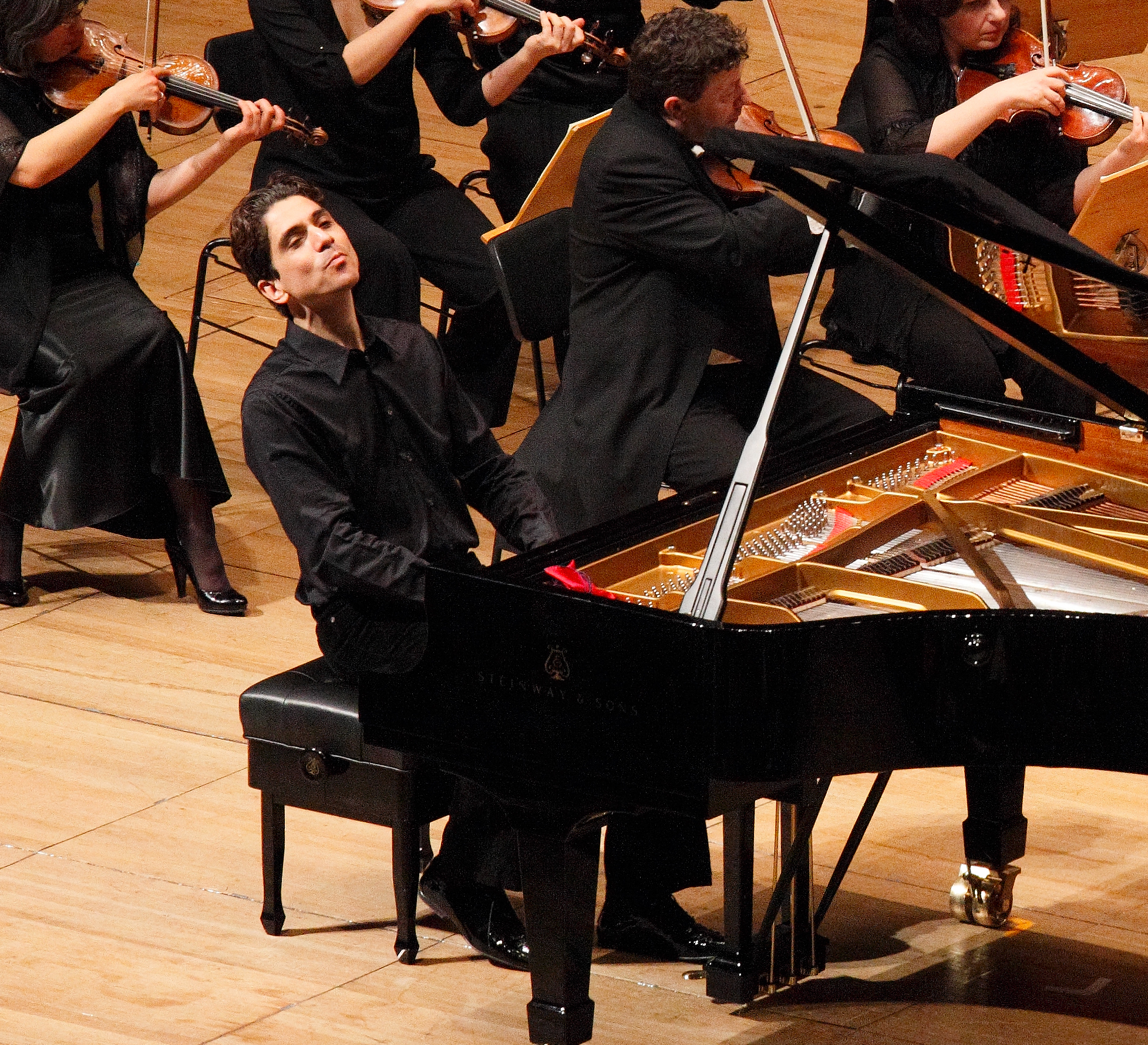
- Alexandros Kapelis performing in 2018
- Born: Lima, Peru
- Citizenship: Greek, Peruvian, USA
- Occupation: Classical Pianist

Alexandros Kapelis is a classical pianist of Greek and Peruvian background. He is active as a recitalist, chamber music player in Europe, Asia, and the Americas.

== Early life and education ==
Alexandros Kapelis was born in Lima, Peru, the son of a Greek father and Peruvian mother. His father's background is from the Ionian Island of Kefalonia; his mother's family comes from Piura, in the North of Peru. He grew up in a bi-cultural home and spent his childhood and teenage years between Peru and Greece. He does not come from a family of musicians, although “there was always a piano at home” and his mother and grandmother “played for their own enjoyment.” He studied music at the Conservatorio Nacional de Música del Perú with Rosa Basurco and Teresa Quesada; at the American College of Greece in Athens, where he received a bachelor's degree under Dimitri Toufexis; at the Mannes School of Music, where he earned a master's degree; and in London with Noretta Conci. He is an alumnus of New York Youth Symphony and performed during their orchestral concerts at Carnegie Hall.

== Career highlights ==
=== New York ===
Kapelis moved to New York at the age of 20 to pursue his musical studies and career and was soon noted by the Inter Press Service (IPS) “one of the most promising classical musicians of any nationality working in New York today.” In 2002 he started a collaboration with the Philharmonic Chamber Soloists, a chamber music ensemble composed of musicians of the New York Philharmonic. Their association lasted until 2010, with performances that took them from Lincoln Center’s Alice Tully Hall to tours in Europe that included London's Cadogan Hall and the Athens Megaron.

=== The Greek Myth Recital Project ===
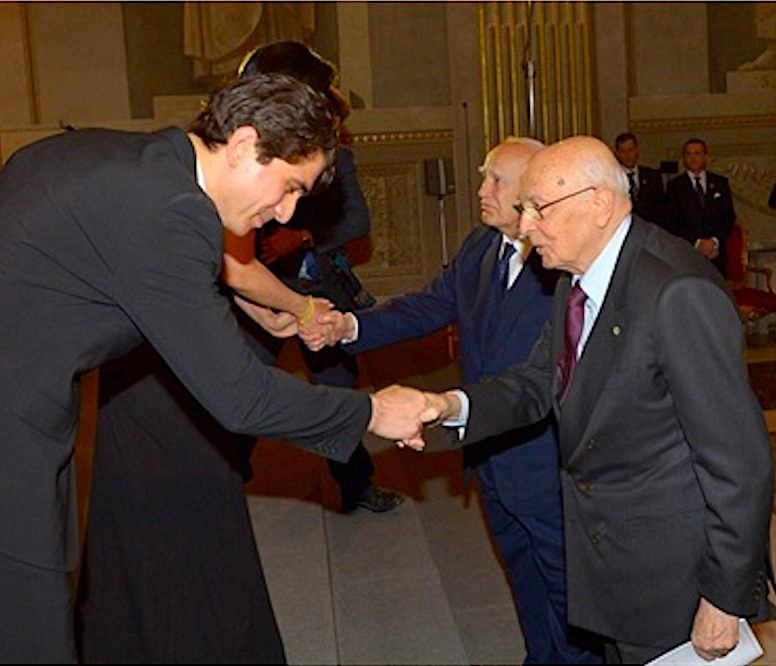
Giorgio Napolitano, President of Italy, congratulates Alexandros Kapelis after Kapelis' performance of his "Greek Myth Recital" at the Palazzo del Quirinale in 2014

Kapelis rose to prominence with a recital programme inspired by Greek mythology. The programme was praised for its originality, “a series of pieces with a strong thread connecting them, containing varying styles and sonorities”. In March 2007 Kapelis toured the United States at the Kennedy Center in Washington DC, the Herbst Theatre at the San Francisco War Memorial & Performing Arts Center, the Chicago Cultural Center, and the Dahesh Museum of Art in New York. The Washington Post praised Kapelis’ performance as “scintillating” and noted that “Kapelis threw himself forcefully into the wild raptures of Claude Debussy's ‘The Joyous Island’ and expertly limned the classical poise of his ‘Dancers of Delphi’”, while also remarking that “Kapelis really shone in the non-mythological ‘Etudes-Tableaux,’ Op. 33, of Sergei Rachmaninov.” The Piedmont Post praised Kapelis’ “impressive performance” and hailed his San Francisco debut as “a glorious one,” noting his “use of a full range of technique in rendering the total palette of keyboard colors” and his “passionate heart.”

In December 2011, Kapelis and his Greek Myth toured through Japan.

In September 2014, Kapelis’ Greek Myth toured Mexico and was the highlight of the season at the Centro Nacional de las Artes Piano Festival.

Kapelis and his “Greek Myth Recital” were chosen for the transfer-of-power ceremony of the Presidency of Council of Europe from Greece to Italy in 2014. The performance took place at Italy's Presidential Palace, the Palazzo del Quirinale, in the presence the President of the Italian Republic Giorgio Napolitano and the President of the Hellenic Republic Karolos Papoulias, as well as the Council of Ministers of both countries. To mark the occasion, a piece from the Acropolis Museum, the famous Mourning Athena, was brought on loan to the Quirinale.

In 2015, Kapelis toured most of Italy's major concert halls performing the Greek Myth at Rome's Parco della Musica, Milan's Auditorium, Florence's Teatro della Pergola, Palermo's Politeama Garibaldi, Vicenza's Teatro Olimpico, culminating in Venice's Palazzo Labia, filmed for broadcast by the Italian Radio-Television (RAI). The concerts received wide attention by the national media, including La Repubblica and Il Giornale di Vicenza, which praised “the genius of Kapelis”.

=== Martha Argerich ===
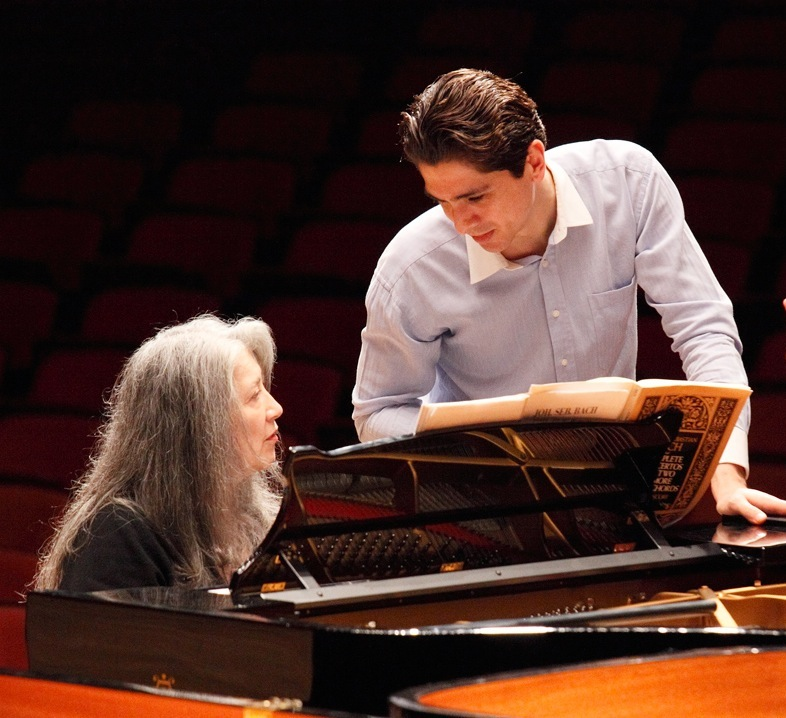
Martha Argerich and Alexandros Kapelis during rehearsal at the Athens Megaron in 2012

Kapelis came to the attention of Martha Argerich in New York in 2003. In 2007, he moved to Brussels—where Argerich lived at the time—and was mentored by the great pianist. Argerich invited Kapelis to perform in the Progetto Martha Argerich, where he appeared on several editions from 2010 until the Festival's last iteration in 2016. When Argerich was asked on Classica Magazine which pianists from the new generation she liked, Alexandros Kapelis was one of the few artists she cited, declaring that “Kapelis has no equal in Rachmaninoff but also plays the classics with astonishing taste”. Kapelis has repeatedly expressed his profound admiration and gratitude towards Argerich, describing her as “a force of nature,” stating that “everything she plays seems to come out in a single breath, the emotion and the full power of the music, with no hesitation, no filtering.”

=== Berlin / The Complete Bach Concertos ===
With the Berliner Barock Solisten, baroque ensemble of the Berlin Philharmonic, Kapelis has recorded the complete Bach Concertos for solo keyboard and orchestra, to be released in 2026. The project includes touring performances in 2025–2028. To kick off the concerts, Kapelis performed all of the Bach solo keyboard concertos in one evening at London's Barbican Centre on 25 March 2025, a feat described as “a tour-de-force not seen on the concert stage in recent memory.” The Guardian praised the concert as a "ravishing period immersion" and noted that Kapelis "combined the ornate decoration you would expect from a harpsichord – agile, swerving scales; filigree trills and ornaments that pinged off the starting note – with techniques available only on the modern piano, making subtle but frequent use of the sustaining pedal and, in a couple of ravishing quiet slow-movement passages, bringing the mute pedal into play." The Guardian went on to remark that "the effect was like the costumes in Bridgerton: authentic silhouette; bright, modern palette."

Kapelis is also featured as soloist and main subject in a documentary with the Berliner Barock Solisten at Bach's final resting place in St. Thomas Church, Leipzig

After hearing Kapelis and the Berliners perform the Bach concertos at a concert in Berlin, conductor Christian Thielemann commended the “effortlessness of Kapelis’ performance of such a difficult programme” and praised Kapelis’ playing as “great Art.”

=== Other notable collaborations ===
Kapelis' collaborators have included violinists Renaud Capuçon and Janine Jansen, violist Yuri Bashmet, cellist Mischa Maisky, trumpeter Sergei Nakariakov, clarinetist Stanley Drucker, oboist Liang Wang, conductor Gábor Tákacs-Nágy, as well as the Royal Philharmonic, the Prague Symphony, and others.

=== Artistic director and advisor ===
In 2012 Kapelis was given the direction of a chamber music festival by the Athens Megaron, presenting Martha Argerich and other distinguished soloists over the course of three days. The series was hailed by the Press as “a triumphant page in the musical life of the city, as well as in the very history of the City of Athens.”

In 2016, Kapelis was put in charge of the chamber music series at the Festival de Lacoste in the South of France, with the mandate to give the festival a more instrumental bent beyond its original operatic and vocal character.

In 2016, Kapelis was offered a position of “Artist in Residence” in Venice for the Malipiero Foundation and subsequently moved to Venice, Italy.

In the summer of 2021, Kapelis headed the “Renaissance: The New Breadth of Venice” initiative as part of the 1600th Anniversary of the foundation of Venice, with a performance atop the Arsenale Tower. Kapelis is founder and artistic director of Epicenter Venice, an international music festival that saw its pilot edition in Venice in September 2023.

=== Conducting ===
Kapelis attended the conducting master-classes of Gianluigi Gelmetti at the Accademia Chigiana in Siena, Italy. He does not pursue a conducting career but often leads Bach and Mozart concertos from the keyboard.

== Humanitarian causes ==
Kapelis has stated that “the artist cannot be absent from society” and has supported various charitable causes.

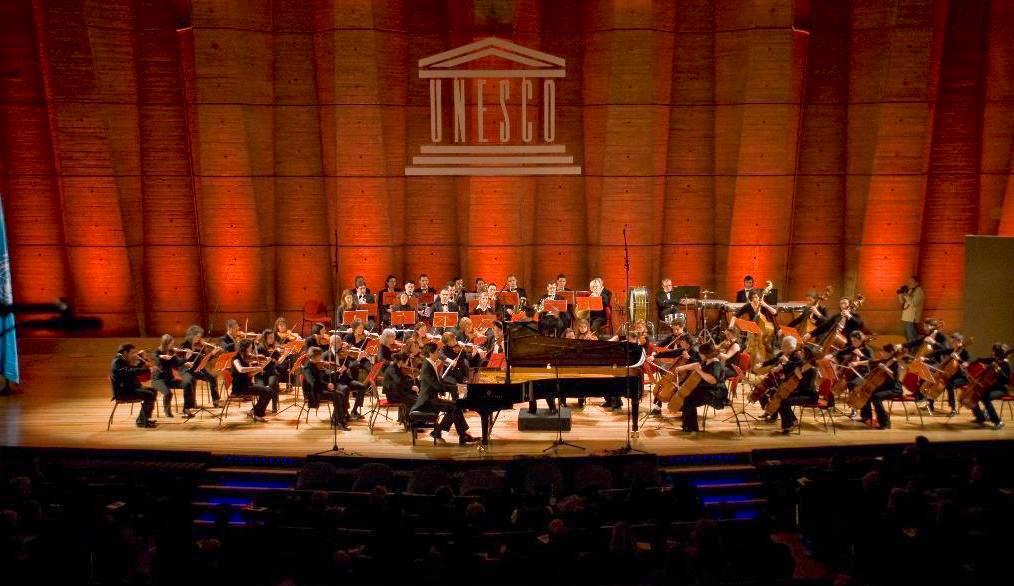
Alexandros Kapelis performing the Rachmaninov Second Piano Concerto at UNESCO with Sabine Aubert

=== Medical Research and People with Disabilities ===
In 1999, Kapelis performed a benefit concert at the Athens Megaron for the Hellenic Society for Disabled Children ELEPAP.

In 1999 and 2000, Kapelis performed fundraising concerts in London for Fight for Sight.

=== Education ===
In 1999 Kapelis performed a fundraising concert for Prince Pavlos of Greece in benefit of United World Colleges, one of Prince Pavlos’ alma maters.

In 2011, Kapelis was a fellow at the Salzburg Global Seminar on the Transformative Power of Music, an initiative that brought together fifty-four leaders from the world of music, including presenters, performers, composers, researchers, policy makers, scientists, and scholars, to explore music's transformative powers and shed new light on ways to benefit from its instrumental value.

In 2019, Kapelis founded the Greco-Latin Trust in order to help young musicians from countries facing economic difficulties, specifically Greece and Latin America. Inspired by his years as a student in New York, and under the guiding principle that “a young musician's ability to grow and flourish should be based on talent, potential, perseverance, and moral character—not on their family's finances,” the Trust aims to provide a living stipend to a full-time piano student every year.

=== Biodiversity and the Environment ===
In 2018, with the aegis of the Hellenic National Commission of UNESCO Kapelis founded Project ECO: Earth Connections Orchestra, an initiative that connects music and the environment.

== Work in fashion ==
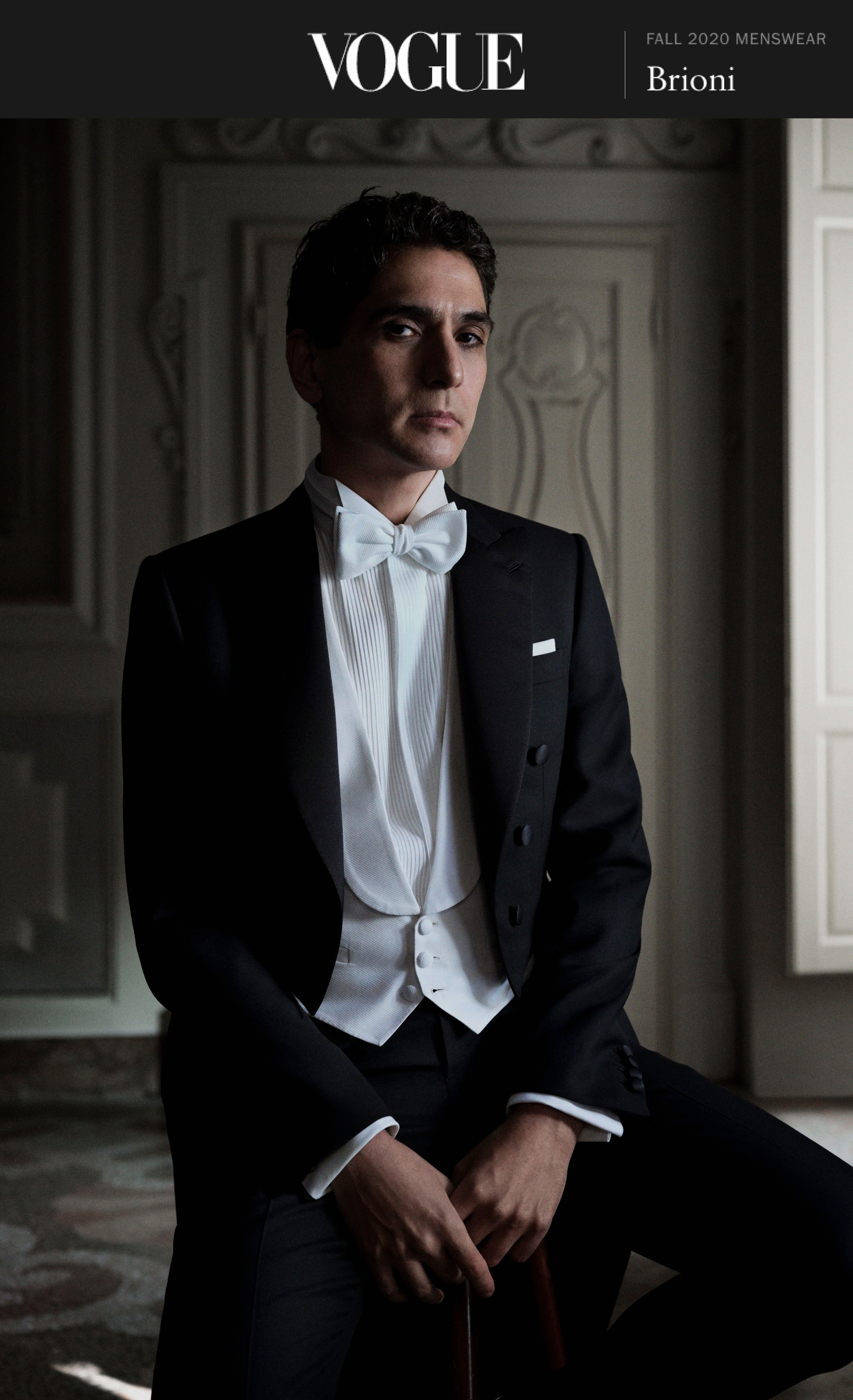
Alexandros Kapelis on Vogue for Brioni on the occasion of its 75th Anniversary celebration during Pitti Uomo in January 2020

In the early 2000s, Kapelis did various fashion magazine editorial pieces showcasing Burberry, Hermès and other luxury brands.

In his twenties, Kapelis became friends with fashion mogul Nicola Bulgari, who was a mentoring figure during Kapelis’ years in New York.

In 2015, Kapelis came to the attention of French fashion designer and cultural icon Pierre Cardin.

In January 2020, Kapelis modelled and performed for Brioni within the frame of Pitti Uomo, on the occasion of Brioni's 75th-anniversary celebration.

Kapelis is an “Exclusive Steinway Artist” for Steinway & Sons.

== Trivia ==
Kapelis has perfect pitch and started playing the piano by ear when he was four, playing the soundtracks of his favorite TV shows.

When he first moved to New York, Kapelis worked as a church organist on Sundays at a Baptist church in Bedford Stuyvensant, Brooklyn.

Kapelis has a brother and a sister. He lives in Venice. He speaks five languages.
