= Blair, Oklahoma =

- Town
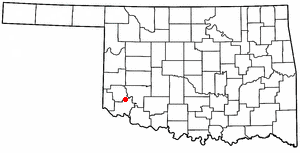
- Location of Blair, Oklahoma
- Coordinates: 34°46′49″N 99°20′00″W
- Country: United States
- State: Oklahoma
- County: Jackson

Area
  - Total: 0.48 sq mi (1.24 km^{2})
  - Land: 0.48 sq mi (1.24 km^{2})
  - Water: 0 sq mi (0.00 km^{2})
- Elevation: 1,467 ft (447 m)

Population (2020)
  - Total: 727
  - Density: 1,524.6/sq mi (588.65/km^{2})
- Time zone: UTC-6 (Central (CST))
  - Summer (DST): UTC-5 (CDT)
- ZIP code: 73526
- Area code: 580
- FIPS code: 40-06650
- GNIS feature ID: 2411695

Blair is a town in Jackson County, Oklahoma, United States. As of the 2020 census, Blair had a population of 727. Blair is located south of the Quartz Mountain State Park and offers scenic views of the mountains.

== Geography ==
According to the United States Census Bureau, the town has a total area of 0.4 square miles (1.0 km^{2}), all land.

== Demographics ==
Historical population
Census	Pop.	Note	%±
1910	508		—
1920	437		−14.0%
1930	585		33.9%
1940	570		−2.6%
1950	700		22.8%
1960	893		27.6%
1970	1,114		24.7%
1980	1,092		−2.0%
1990	922		−15.6%
2000	894		−3.0%
2010	818		−8.5%
2020	727		−11.1%
U.S. Decennial Census

=== 2020 census ===
As of the 2020 census, Blair had a population of 727. The median age was 39.8 years. 23.9% of residents were under the age of 18 and 20.4% of residents were 65 years of age or older. For every 100 females there were 98.1 males, and for every 100 females age 18 and over there were 90.0 males age 18 and over.

0.0% of residents lived in urban areas, while 100.0% lived in rural areas.

There were 314 households in Blair, of which 28.3% had children under the age of 18 living in them. Of all households, 45.2% were married-couple households, 19.7% were households with a male householder and no spouse or partner present, and 31.5% were households with a female householder and no spouse or partner present. About 30.9% of all households were made up of individuals and 16.3% had someone living alone who was 65 years of age or older.

There were 355 housing units, of which 11.5% were vacant. The homeowner vacancy rate was 2.0% and the rental vacancy rate was 7.8%.

Racial composition as of the 2020 census
Race	Number	Percent
White	607	83.5%
Black or African American	4	0.6%
American Indian and Alaska Native	21	2.9%
Asian	0	0.0%
Native Hawaiian and Other Pacific Islander	0	0.0%
Some other race	26	3.6%
Two or more races	69	9.5%
Hispanic or Latino (of any race)	113	15.5%

=== 2000 census ===
As of the census of 2000, there were 894 people, 361 households, and 258 families residing in the town. The population density was 2,131.3 people per square mile (821.8 per km ^{2}). There were 430 housing units at an average density of 1,025.1 per square mile (395.3 per km ^{2}). The racial makeup of the town was 86.69% White, 1.79% Native American, 0.34% Asian, 0.11% Pacific Islander, 7.49% from other races, and 3.58% from two or more races. Hispanic or Latino of any race were 10.40% of the population.

There were 361 households, out of which 36.3% had children under the age of 18 living with them, 56.8% were married couples living together, 11.1% had a female householder with no husband present, and 28.3% were non-families. 25.2% of all households were made up of individuals, and 12.7% had someone living alone who was 65 years of age or older. The average household size was 2.48 and the average family size was 2.96.

In the town, the population was spread out, with 28.6% under the age of 18, 9.2% from 18 to 24, 24.5% from 25 to 44, 23.6% from 45 to 64, and 14.1% who were 65 years of age or older. The median age was 36 years. For every 100 females, there were 95.2 males. For every 100 females age 18 and over, there were 88.8 males.

The median income for a household in the town was $29,821, and the median income for a family was $33,125. Males had a median income of $25,739 versus $19,038 for females. The per capita income for the town was $12,833. About 11.7% of families and 14.6% of the population were below the poverty line, including 16.3% of those under age 18 and 16.4% of those age 65 or over.

== Climate ==
Climate data for Blair, Oklahoma
Month	Jan	Feb	Mar	Apr	May	Jun	Jul	Aug	Sep	Oct	Nov	Dec	Year
Mean daily maximum °F (°C)	51.9 (11.1)	57.8 (14.3)	68.1 (20.1)	78.2 (25.7)	85.6 (29.8)	93.5 (34.2)	99.1 (37.3)	97.3 (36.3)	88.5 (31.4)	78.3 (25.7)	64.0 (17.8)	53.6 (12.0)	76.3 (24.6)
Mean daily minimum °F (°C)	24.5 (−4.2)	29.2 (−1.6)	37.8 (3.2)	47.5 (8.6)	57.1 (13.9)	65.5 (18.6)	69.2 (20.7)	67.8 (19.9)	60.8 (16.0)	49.3 (9.6)	37.6 (3.1)	27.9 (−2.3)	47.9 (8.8)
Average precipitation inches (mm)	0.8 (20)	1.1 (28)	1.5 (38)	1.8 (46)	4.3 (110)	3.8 (97)	2.0 (51)	2.3 (58)	3.4 (86)	2.7 (69)	1.3 (33)	0.8 (20)	25.6 (650)
Source: Weatherbase.com

== Notable people ==
- Clarence Ray Allen, executed murderer
- Bob Stephenson, baseball player
- Read Southall Band, American Red Dirt Band
