= Southwell =

Southwell may refer to:

== Geography ==
- Southwell, Dorset, a village
- Southwell, Nottinghamshire, a town
  - Southwell Minster, historic cathedral
    - Prebends of Southwell
  - Southwell Racecourse, horse racing venue located near Newark-on-Trent, Nottinghamshire
  - Southwell Rural District, a rural district in Nottinghamshire, England from 1894 to 1974
- Southwell, Eastern Cape, a settlement in South Africa

== Other ==
- Southwell (surname)
- Southwell, assumed name of Nathaniel Bacon (Jesuit), 17th century English Jesuit
- Viscount Southwell, a title in the Peerage of Ireland
- Southwell School, Hamilton, New Zealand
