= Bob Stephenson (baseball) =

American baseball player (1928–2020)

- Shortstop
- Born: August 11, 1928; Blair, Oklahoma, U.S.
- Died: March 20, 2020 (aged 91); Oklahoma City, Oklahoma, U.S.
- Batted: Right Threw: Right

MLB debut
- April 14, 1955, for the St. Louis Cardinals

Last MLB appearance
- September 18, 1955, for the St. Louis Cardinals

MLB statistics
- Batting average: .243
- Home runs: 0
- Runs batted in: 6
- Stats at Baseball Reference

Teams
- St. Louis Cardinals (1955)

Robert Loyd Stephenson (August 11, 1928 – March 20, 2020) was an American professional baseball player. He played 67 games, primarily at shortstop, for the 1955 St. Louis Cardinals of Major League Baseball. Stephenson threw and batted right-handed, stood 6 feet (1.83 m) tall and weighed 165 pounds (75 kg). He attended the University of Oklahoma.

Stephenson struggled offensively during his professional career. The .243 batting average he recorded in part-time duty (as a backup to Alex Grammas) for the 1955 Cardinals was the highest batting mark of his five-year (1950–1951; 1954–1956) pro career. Of his 27 Major League hits, only three went for extra bases — and all three were doubles. From June 21 through July 21, Stephenson had 22 hits in 50 at bats (.440) over 16 games, including 12 as St. Louis' starting shortstop. He had a nine-game hitting streak from June 26 through July 5. On June 17, 1956, Stephenson was traded as the player to be named to complete a deal St. Louis had made with the New York Giants on June 14 of that year, but never appeared in another major league game.

Stephenson died on March 20, 2020.
