= Gustavo R. Paz-Pujalt =

Peruvian American scientist and inventor (born 1954)

Gustavo R. Paz-Pujalt (born 1954) is a Peruvian American scientist and inventor. He holds 45 US patents and 59 international patents mainly in the areas of remote sensing, thin films, sensors, and upconversion materials.

== Education ==
Paz-Pujalt was born August 9, 1954, in Arequipa, Peru. He is of Galician and Welsh descent on his father's side and Catalan and Basque on his mother's. He graduated from San Andrés (Colegio), an Anglo Peruvian college preparatory school in Lima, Peru. He graduated with honors and received the Miller Prize for accomplishments in English. Paz-Pujalt did his undergraduate work at the University of Wisconsin-Eau Claire and completed his Ph.D. in physical chemistry at the University of Wisconsin–Milwaukee. His doctoral adviser was George Keulks. He was also mentored by the distinguished professor W. Keith Hall. During this time, he studied surface science under Gert Ertl, winner of the Nobel Prize in Chemistry. Additionally, Paz-Pujalt has received numerous executive level diplomas from MIT and Wharton.

== Positions ==
He was the Eastman Kodak Company's Senior Research Associate from 1986 to 2004, the Director of Technology for IPValue at Xerox from 2004 to 2007, and is currently the CEO of Idealurgy, a knowledge company, which currently serves the needs of Fortune 500 corporations, International Industry Consortia, and major international research universities. Paz-Pujalt's patents are seminal to the formation of Frintz.com, an industry changing advertising medium. Other parts of his portfolio have been sold or licensed to Intellectual Ventures, IT&T Manufacturing, Excelis, Harris Corporation, Amazon, Meta, Microsoft, and TikTok.
