= Herbert Money =

- Born: Herbert Money; 29 November 1899; Queensland, Australia
- Died: 9 January 1996 (aged 96); Christchurch, New Zealand
- Occupations: Educator, missionary
- Spouse: Netta Kemp-Money
- Awards: Knight-Commander, Order of Magisterial Palms

Herbert Money (29 November 1899 - 9 January 1996) was a Christian educator. He was involved with the Evangelical church in Peru and throughout South America. He worked in Peru for 40 years and was known variously as 'The General' or 'The King'.

== Biography ==
=== Early life in Australia and New Zealand ===
Herbert Money was the eldest son of Edwin and Mary Money, and was born in Queensland, Australia, on 29 November 1899. He moved with his family to Christchurch, New Zealand, in 1904.

Money's parents had been officers in The Salvation Army and he became a Christian early in his life. Around the age of eight he was enrolled as a junior soldier of The Salvation Army in the old barracks of the SA Christchurch City Corps. Between 1910 and 1918, the family worshipped at Oxford Terrace Baptist Church. In 1918, the family moved again, to worship at Richmond Mission.

After a year as a day student at the Christchurch Technical College, he left school at the age of 15 to contribute to the family income. He spent two years with Turnbull and Jones, a firm of electrical engineers, and then joined the staff of T H Green's wholesale grocers for two years. He was determined to pursue a higher education and, while continuing with daytime employment, successfully compressed a year of full-time study into a year of night study. In 1920, he matriculated and became a probation teacher at Christchurch East Primary School.

In 1921, Money entered Teachers' Training College and Canterbury University College. In 1924, he wrote the thesis for his MA degree. His mentor was Professor James Shelley. The following year he gained diplomas in education and social science.

From 1924 he served on the staff of Christchurch Technical College until his departure for Peru in 1927.

=== Early influences ===
In 1926, the renowned missionary Dr John R Mott visited university colleges in New Zealand under the auspices of the Student Christian Movement seeking missionaries for the continent of Asia. As Money wished to go to South America, Dr Mott put him in touch with Dr John A Mackay. In 1917, Mackay, supported by the Free Church of Scotland, had founded Colegio Anglo Peruano, a school for boys in Lima, Peru. In 1942, the school name was changed to Colegio San Andrés.

Money's interest in South America was inspired by the testimonies of Frederick B Glass, whom he met in 1925, and of George Allan, a New Zealander and founder of the Bolivian Indian Mission, whom he met in 1926. Both wrote in Money's personal autograph album. Glass completed his words of encouragement with a quote from Carlyle: ‘Choose well, your choice is brief but eternal [is brief and yet endless]'. Mackay, who had by then been appointed by the YMCA to be secretary-at-large for South America, passed on Money's name to the Free Church of Scotland. The church was looking for someone with his qualifications, and since none could be found in Scotland he was offered a position on the staff of the college.

== Work in Peru ==
=== Netta Kemp ===
When Money arrived in Peru on 2 August 1927, he considered his chances of finding a life partner to be slim (his own words), but within a few days he was to meet Janet "Netta" Kemp, the only female teacher in Colegio Anglo Peruano. Within two months of their meeting the couple announced their engagement. Reverend J Calvin Mackay officiated their wedding on 11 January 1928 in Cajamarca. According to Spanish custom, she became known as Netta Kemp de Money. Both were fluent in Spanish and enjoyed their teaching ministry. Unfortunately they were unable to have children.

=== John Mackay ===
Mackay firmly believed that a missionary, particularly one engaged in educational work, should immerse himself in the life of the country and become as familiar as possible with its history, politics, sociology and culture. In the academic world of Peru a doctoral degree was expected of a person appointed to be the principal or vice-principal of a large school. Mackay had qualified for a doctorate in philosophy in 1918, the first Anglo-American to do so from the University of San Marcos. Over the ensuing years six other members of the college staff followed his example.

=== Peruvian qualifications ===
In the 1920s, the bachelor's degree was, for most students, a prelude to law or medical studies. There was no master's degree. For a doctorate a subject could be chosen in the fields of history, letters or philosophy. The course required the study of a wide range of topics followed by the submission of a thesis in consultation with a professor. Money was determined to follow Mackey’s example and immerse himself in local study.

Early in 1928, within six months of arriving in Peru, Money had become sufficiently fluent in Spanish to matriculate and enrol as a doctoral student. He studied for three years and during this time he was either teaching at the College or was ill with tuberculosis. Money chose the sociology of Peruvian Amazonia as the subject for his doctoral thesis because he hoped to minister to the "Lowland Indians".

Money presented his thesis in December 1930, but the university was then closed to political events. Only the President of Peru could authorise a degree ceremony while the university was closed. Money had become friends with his professors, and they encouraged him to present a petition to the President, which was ultimately accepted. The needed ceremony went forward, and Money was awarded the degree of Doctor of Philosophy with distinction.

=== Peruvian Evangelical Church ===
Money was one of the founders of Iglesia Evangelica Peruana (the Peruvian Evangelical Church). The church was established in 1932 as a cooperative enterprise of the Evangelical Union of South America and the Christian Missionary Alliance. It was a self-governing, self-supporting and self-propagating body that brought together a diversity of missionaries of different denominations. Less than four years after his arrival in Peru, Money was chairman of the commission that wrote the first constitution of the church and enabled it to be legally recognised by the government.

=== Peruvian Bible Institute ===
The Instituto Biblico Peruano (Peruvian Bible Institute), was founded in 1933 as a co-operative venture under the joint auspices of the Evangelical Union of South America, the Christian Missionary Alliance and the Free Church of Scotland. Its purpose was to train believers for Christian service. Money supported the institute and helped create the curriculum. After a few years the Christian Missionary Alliance found it necessary to reduce its support and responsibility for the directorship of the Institute which was then assumed by a Board of Governors composed of Christian businessmen resident in Lima, Money being amongst their number. Money's contacts enabled the Institute to acquire land for expansion. Through the years Money and his wife remained strong supporters of the Institute. From 1934 until 1968, when he left Peru, Money lectured on church history.

=== National Evangelical Council ===
Money’s sphere of influence widened when he was invited in 1940 to become the first organising and executive secretary of the newly created National Evangelical Council. He was also granted a diplomatic pass which gave him access to restricted areas where he could attend to the needs of missionaries.

=== New Zealand Fellowship of the Peruvian Bible Schools ===
In 1947, the Moneys returned to New Zealand on furlough. At that time, they found that, due to ideological differences, the Richmond Mission was unable to continue its financial support. The Money’s long-term view was to foster the development of the indigenous church, whereas the Mission believed the urgent need was to preach the gospel in all its simplicity, not to train others to teach, as they were 'now in the last days'. A second major difference of view related to the Moneys' work towards co-operation between evangelical churches, as Money believed in the need for reconciliation between different Christian groups.

At this time a number of prominent New Zealand Christian men joined together to form the New Zealand Fellowship of the Peruvian Bible Schools. The relationship between the Fellowship and the Moneys continued until they returned to Christchurch in 1968.

The Wycliffe Bible Translators came to Peru in 1946 and in 1956 the first students, literate in Spanish as well as their native tongue, graduated from a bilingual school. Money started planning for a Jungle Indian Bible School. He brought together the Wycliffe Bible translators, Le Tourneau (an American builder of heavy machinery) and Dr Moro of the Swiss Indian Mission. The Bible Institute for Lowland Indians (Instituto Biblico Selvatico de Pucallpa) was established in Peruvian Amazonia on the eastern side of the Andes, and opened in 1957 (under the leadership of Dr Moro). The following year, a permanent site was chosen in the vicinity of the Wycliffe base camp at Yarinacocha.

In time, there came an increasing demand for more advanced training and a growing need for a better-prepared ministry. To meet this need Money, then secretary of the Board of the Peruvian Bible Institute, worked for the creation of Lima Evangelical Seminary. In 1961, the board approved the project and the first students were admitted the following year. Money held the position of vice-rector until he left Peru in 1968.

== Recognition ==
Upon his departure from Peru, in 1968, the Government of Peru conferred upon Money the honour of Knight-Commander, Order of Magisterial Palms, in recognition of his 40 years of distinguished service in the field of education. This service included the supervision of school certificate examinations for the University of Cambridge, the temporary headship of the Colegio San Silvestre for girls upon the death of the headmistress, Miss Nellie Kufal, until the arrival of her successor from Britain, the organisation and inauguration of Markham College for boys and its headship pending the arrival of the titular headmaster, the founding of the Bible Institute for Lowland Indians in Amazonia and the creation of the Lima Evangelical Seminary.

In 1964, The Salvation Army awarded him The Order of Distinguished Auxiliary Service for his significant contributions to the work of the SA. He is one of few New Zealanders so recognised. Money was a friend and adviser to several of the SA's leaders in Peru. His influential contacts assisted the SA in commencing a prison brigade programme. He accompanied General Albert Orsborn on his visit to Peru and translated for him.

In 1984, Money was given an honorary Doctorate of Divinity from the Central School of Religion of Indiana. It was a singular honour in that he was neither an ordained minister nor trained for the ministry.

== Retirement ==
In 1968, at his retirement from San Andrés School, Money was asked what subjects he had taught. He replied: ‘Geography, music, art, handwork, history, psychology, logic, philosophy, religion and English’. When asked if any students stood out in his memory, he named a list of men holding the highest positions in Peruvian life, including a former cabinet minister with the nickname at school of ‘Sleepy Donkey’. Money had taught at the school from 1927 until his retirement, apart from a brief period between 1940 and 1942.

Money travelled widely in both North and South America and represented Peru at international conferences in the Netherlands, Switzerland and Germany. His commitment to the tasks appointed him was well illustrated when he visited Switzerland in 1968. On his way to Lausanne he took ill in West Hartlepool with urinary retention and had to undergo emergency surgery. Determined to fulfil his engagement in Switzerland, Money persuaded his medical advisers to let him go with an indwelling urinary catheter.

== Post-retirement ==
Money retired in 1968 and settled in Christchurch. He was appointed general secretary of the Evangelical Alliance of New Zealand and, in 1972, elected president. He attended Inter-Varsity Fellowship conferences and many conventions.

Until May 1992, Money travelled south each year to give a lecture at the annual Waihola Christian Youth Camps. He did not see age as a bar to participating in the activities of youth.

Money never forgot his beloved Peru and Spanish was for him a first language as much as English. After serving as President of the Christchurch Spanish Club for several years, he was elected a life member of the Sociedad Hispanica. In this capacity he assisted many new immigrants particularly from Chile, with legal advice.

In his last years Money's greatest pleasure was to hear of the growth of the evangelical movement in Peru. He felt that the foundations for Christian education he had laid were now bearing fruit in abundance.

== Additional Material ==
Credentials as detailed by Dr Money

- M A, with 1st Class Honours in Education, University of N Z, 1925
- Dip Ed (Diploma in Education), University of N Z, 1926
- Dip Soc S (Diploma in Social Sciences), University of N Z, 1926
- Ph D, Sociology, Universidad Mayor de San Marcos, Peru, 1931
- Master, Colegio Anglo Peruano, Lima, Peru, 1927-1939
- Lecturer in Church History, Instituto Biblico Peruano, 1934-1968
- Vice Rector and Professor Historia del Cristianismo y Teologia Sistematica, Seminario Evangelico del Peru, 1940-1968
- Secretario Concilio Nacional Evangelico del Peru, 1940-1968
- Founder, Instituto Biblico Selvatico de Pucallpa, 1957
- Knight-Commander, Order of Magisterial Palms, official recognition by Government of Peru for 40 years of distinguished service in the field of education.
- Order of Distinguished Auxiliary Service (The Salvation Army)
- DD (Hon)

== Bibliography ==
1. H. Bramwell Cook, White Gujaratis, Published Bramwell Cook, Christchurch, 2007, ISBN 978-0-473-12112-9
2. Margaret Kemp Melanson (editor), Memories of Peru, Unpublished, Christchurch, 1984
3. John M. McPherson, At the Roots of a Nation: The story of San Andrés School in Lima, Peru. The Knox Press, Edinburgh, 1993
4. Stewart McIntosh (editor), The Money Memoirs, New Zealand and Peru, 3 Vols. (1988)
5. John Metzger, The Hand and the Road: the Life and Times of John Mackay, Westminster John Knox Press, Louisville, 2010
