= Alfredo Salazar Southwell =

Peruvian aviator

Alfredo Salazar Southwell (1913 – 14 September 1937) was a Peruvian aviator, celebrated as a national hero.

== Biography ==
Salazar was born in 1913 (exact date uncertain) to an established family in Lima. In 1920, he entered the Anglo-Peruvian School. Graduating with high marks, he entered the School of Engineers in 1931.

The next year, he enlisted in the Peruvian Air Force as a cadet. He finished his military studies in 1935, assuming the rank of sub-ensign, and was assigned the post of flight instructor for cadets. In 1936, he was promoted to the rank of flight officer.

On the morning of 14 September 1937, during a rehearsal for an airshow celebrating the inauguration of a monument to Jorge Chávez, the airplane he was piloting started emitting smoke. On seeing this, Salazar ordered his copilot, a mechanical technician surnamed Fajardo, to parachute to safety. Fajardo initially protested, but followed orders. Salazar then flew away from urban areas. The plane crashed in a field in the seaside district of Miraflores, killing Southwell. The field was dedicated as a park in his memory, and a monument honoring him was erected there in 1953.

== See also ==
- Colegio San Andrés
