= Robert Southwell =

Robert Southwell may refer to:

- Robert Southwell (lawyer) (c. 1506–1559), English civil servant, High Sheriff and MP for Kent
- Robert Southwell (priest) (c. 1561–1595), English Jesuit and poet, Catholic martyr
- Robert Southwell (died 1598) (1563–1598), MP for Guildford
- Robert Southwell (diplomat) (1635–1702), English diplomat, Secretary of State for Ireland and President of the Royal Society
- Robert Henry Southwell (1745–1817), Irish MP for Downpatrick
