= One heart for peace =

- Formation: 2005
- Type: non-profit organization
- Headquarters: Paris, France
- Location: Hadassah Medical Center, Ein Karem
- Founder: Muriel Haïm
- Website: http://www.uncoeurpourlapaix.org/

One heart for peace (in french: Un coeur pour la paix) is a French association, created in 2005 by Muriel Haïm, to help Palestinian children suffering from heart disease and to bring Israelis and Palestinians closer with several joint actions in health care and education.

One heart for peace was born for one reason: Palestinian children who suffer from congenital malformations of the heart, need to be operated, and there is no pediatric cardiac surgery service in the West Bank or the Gaza Strip. One heart for peace was created to organize and fund a program of prevention and treatment for children.

Although peace between the two peoples has not yet been achieved, these children are the living proof of cooperation between Israeli doctors and their Palestinian colleagues in Jerusalem and the West Bank. The cooperation surprises visitors, politicians and journalists, who come to discover the program, which takes place at the Hadassah Hospital in Jerusalem.

One heart for peace, operates free of charge the Palestinian children who suffer serious malformations of the heart, often lethal, in the Hadassah Hospital in Jerusalem. This is possible thanks to the cooperation of a team of Israeli and Palestinian doctors who work together.
