= Read Southall Band =

American country rock band

Southall, formerly known as Read Southall Band, is an American country rock band from Stillwater, Oklahoma, formed by Read Southall, a native of Blair, Oklahoma. The band is associated with the Oklahoma red dirt music scene.

== History ==
The group's first record, Six String Sorrow, was released in 2015, at which time the sextet of Southall, Perry, Barber, Knipp, Curlis, and Wellman had assembled.

In 2021, they released "Rose Gold" as the lead single for the album For the Birds, which was issued in October of that year.

The group's 2023 album, Southall, was produced by Eddie Spear. They opened for Blackberry Smoke on a tour of Europe in 2023.

== Members ==
- Read Southall - lead vocals
- John Tyler "J.T." Perry - lead guitar, backing vocals
- Reid Barber - drums
- Jeremee Knipp - bass
- Braxton Curliss - keyboards
- Ryan Wellman - rhythm guitar

== Discography ==
- Six String Sorrow (Self-released, 2015)
- Borrowed Time (Self-released, 2017)
- For the Birds (Smoklahoma Records, 2021)
- Southall (Smoklahoma, 2023)
- Kinfolk (Smoklahoma, 2026)
