= Richard Southwell =

Richard Southwell may refer to:

- Richard Southwell (courtier) (1504–1564), English courtier, Master-General of the Ordnance and Custos Rotulorum of Norfolk
- Richard Southwell (died 1514) (1449–1514), British administrator from Norfolk
- Richard Southwell alias Darcy (died 1600), MP for Gatton
- Richard Southwell (Askeaton politician) (died 1688), Irish MP for Askeaton
- Richard Southwell (Limerick politician) (c. 1667–1729), his son, Irish MP for Limerick County
- Sir Richard V. Southwell (1888–1970), English mathematician and engineering science academic
