= Teresa Quesada =

Peruvian pianist

Teresa Quesada is a Peruvian pianist.

== Life and career ==
She was a student of Rudolf Serkin at the Curtis Institute of Music and of Gyorgy Sandor at Indiana University. She performed Tchaikovsky's Piano Concerto No. 1 under Eugene Ormandy with the Philadelphia Orchestra and later became an influential teacher at the National Conservatory of Music in Lima.
