= Noel King (broadcast journalist) =

American journalist and editorial director

- Born: Kerhonkson, NY
- Education: Brown University
- Occupation: Radio host
- Presenting career
- Show: Today Explained
- Network: Vox

Noel King is a co-host and editorial director of the podcast and radio show Today Explained for Vox. She is a graduate of Brown University, and comes from Kerhonkson, New York. King began working in radio in 2004 in Khartoum as a freelance journalist for the Voice of America. She also worked for Public Radio International's The World, and was a correspondent for the Planet Money podcast. From 2018 through 2021, King was a host of NPR's Morning Edition and Up First.

== Awards ==
In October 2020, King was awarded the "One To Watch" award from radiohalloffame.com.

Media offices
Preceded by n/a	Host of Morning Edition; 2018-present (co-host with Steve Inskeep (2004-present), David Greene (2012-2020), and Rachel Martin (2016-present))	Succeeded by Leila Fadel
