= Up First =

News podcast by NPR

- Genre: Monday-Saturday: News summary Sunday: Long-form journalism
- Language: English

Cast and voices
- Hosted by: Steve Inskeep, A Martínez, Leila Fadel, Michel Martin (weekdays); Scott Simon, Ayesha Rascoe (Saturdays); Rachel Martin (Sundays)

Production
- Length: avg. 10-15 minutes (Monday-Saturday) to 25 minutes (Sunday)

Publication
- Provider: National Public Radio
- Updates: Monday-Friday by 6 a.m. ET; Saturdays and Sundays by 8 a.m. ET

Related
- Website: npr.org/podcasts/510318/up-first

Up First is a daily news podcast by the American media organization NPR, which releases an episode every weekday at 6:30 a.m. ET, Saturdays at 9 a.m. ET, and Sundays by 8 a.m ET. Up First gives a brief overview of each news item in its weekday and Saturday episodes, unlike some of NPR's other popular news podcasts which provide a deep exploration of each story. The Sunday edition of the podcast varies between originally produced content for the feed and showcasing previously published episodes for NPR's various long-form journalism podcasts.

The podcast was launched on April 5, 2017, in order to showcase the most prominent stories of the day in a digestible format, and giving hosts the opportunity to discuss current news items with experts. The podcast's weekday edition is hosted by Morning Edition hosts A Martínez, Steve Inskeep, Leila Fadel, and Michel Martin. The podcast expanded to a Saturday edition on November 9, 2019, and is hosted by Weekend Edition Saturday host Scott Simon alongside Weekend Edition Sunday host Ayesha Rascoe. Beginning on January 9, 2022, the podcast expanded to a Sunday edition now hosted by Ayesha Rascoe offering extended content in each episode to provide context behind current headlines.

== Format ==
When Up First launched, it was intended to be a spin off of the popular NPR show Morning Edition, a morning news show that runs for several hours each weekday on NPR. For many people, Morning Edition was inaccessible due to its length or the time in which it aired. For this reason, Up First was introduced to cater to the "more than three-fourths of NPR podcast listeners [who] say they are “definitely” interested in short, daily audio news updates."

Up First was NPR's solution to delivering the most broad overview of the show for the day, as many fans of Morning Edition didn't have the hours to dedicate to listening to the long show. After Morning Edition first goes live at 5 am ET, NPR takes its first 10 minutes or so with its hosts, and edits that into the show that many know best as Up First. When the Morning Edition broadcast picks up again at 7 am ET, the first ten minutes of the broadcast are replaced with something new to keep the information fresh and not repetitive.

== Competition with The Daily ==
Though Up First is often compared to The New York Times daily news podcast The Daily, the two podcasts have differences in how they are formatted. The Daily, a 20-25 minute podcast, favors an in-depth look at a single story. Meanwhile, NPR's Up First clocks in closer to 15 minutes each day trying to make the day's biggest news stories as accessible and digestible as possible, typically over three to four segments in each episode.

Up First is available to listen to on the NPR website, NPR One, and anywhere else NPR podcasts are posted.

== Accolades ==
Accolades received by Up First
Award	Year (Note: Indicates the year of ceremony)	Category	Recipient(s)	Result	Ref.
Golden Globe Awards	2026	Best Podcast	Up First	Nominated	

== See also ==
- List of daily news podcasts
