= Ayesha Rascoe =

American journalist

- Rascoe in 2025
- Born: June 10, 1985 (age 41)
- Education: Howard University (BA)
- Occupation: Journalist
- Spouse: Patrick Trice (m. 2012)
- Children: 3

Ayesha Rascoe (/ˈrɑːskoʊ/; born June 10, 1985) is an American journalist who hosts Weekend Edition Sunday on NPR. She previously served as an NPR White House correspondent and covered the Obama White House for Reuters.

== Early life and education ==
Ayesha Rascoe was born on June 10, 1985. She grew up in Durham, North Carolina, and attended Carrington Middle School and Southern High School, where she was editor-in-chief of the school newspaper. She was also a columnist for the teen section of The Herald-Sun and interned for the Winston-Salem Journal.

In 2007, she earned a B.A. in journalism from Howard University, where she was the editor-in-chief of the student newspaper The Hilltop.

== Career ==
Rascoe began her reporting career at Reuters, where she covered environment policy, including the Deepwater Horizon oil spill and the response to the Fukushima Daiichi nuclear disaster in 2011.

Rascoe began reporting for NPR in 2017. As NPR's White House correspondent, her stories were regularly broadcast on the NPR shows Morning Edition and All Things Considered, and she appeared regularly on NPR's Politics Podcast. In March 2022, she began hosting NPR's Weekend Edition Sunday and co-hosting the Saturday edition of their Up First podcast with Scott Simon. On June 11, 2023, she succeeded Rachel Martin as host of Up First's The Sunday Story. Rascoe's regional North Carolina accent and distinctive pronunciation that "sounds Black" has received both positive and negative feedback from listeners.

She has appeared on Washington Week, Meet The Press, CNN and MSNBC.

Rascoe edited HBCU Made: A Celebration of the Black College Experience, a collection, released on January 30, 2024, of essays by graduates of historically Black colleges and universities.

== Personal life ==
Rascoe married Patrick Trice, a U.S. veteran, in 2012. The couple had three children and have since divorced.
