= Arsalan Iftikhar =

American lawyer (born 1977)

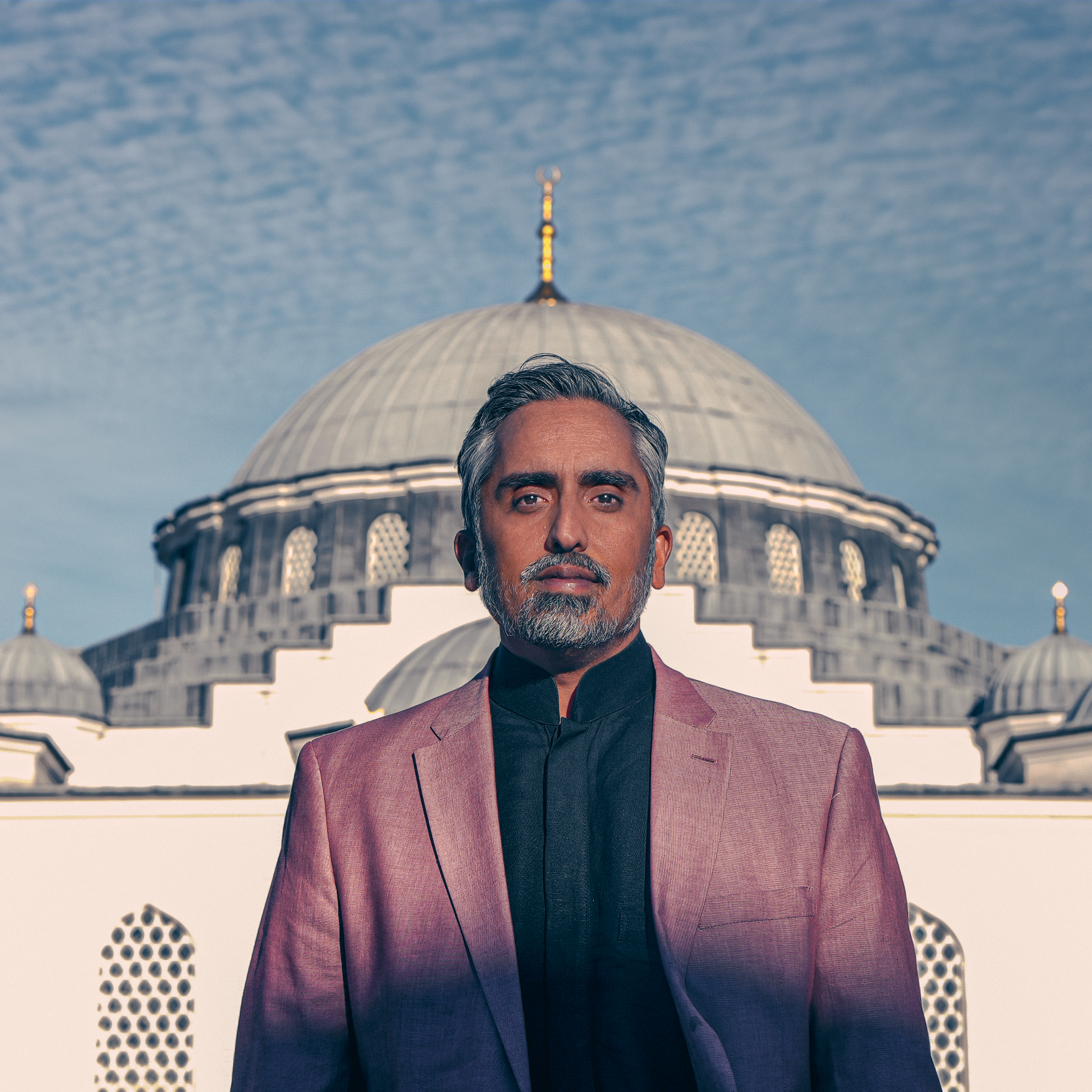
- Born: September 1, 1977 (age 49); Norfolk, Virginia, U.S.
- Education: Washington University in St. Louis; Washington University School of Law
- Occupations: Lawyer, global media commentator, author

Arsalan Iftikhar (born September 1, 1977) is an American human rights lawyer, global media commentator and author of the books including Fear of a Muslim Planet: Global Islamophobia in the New World Order and SCAPEGOATS: How Islamophobia Helps Our Enemies & Threatens Our Freedoms.

Arsalan is founder of TheMuslimGuy.com and longtime senior editor for The Islamic Monthly magazine. For five years, Arsalan served as research faculty member at Georgetown University’s Edmund A. Walsh School of Foreign Service where he wrote about Islamophobia as a Senior Fellow for The Bridge Initiative. Iftikhar is also a national advisory board member for the John C. Danforth Center for Religion & Politics at Washington University in St. Louis. He has also been an adjunct professor of religious studies at DePaul University and is a member of the Asian American Journalists Association (AAJA) and Reporters Without Borders.

== Early life and education ==
Arsalan Iftikhar is of Pakistani descent and founder of TheMuslimGuy.com and longtime Editor for The Islamic Monthly magazine.

Arsalan graduated from Washington University in St. Louis in 1999 and received his Juris Doctor degree from Washington University School of Law in 2003. A native of Chicago, he specializes in international human rights law and is licensed to practice law in Washington DC.

== Career ==
For over seven years, Arsalan was a regular weekly contributor on the Barbershop segment for the National Public Radio (NPR) show Tell Me More with Michel Martin. Arsalan was also the former National Legal Director of the Council on American Islamic Relations (CAIR) during the George W. Bush administration.

Arsalan's media interviews, commentaries, and analyses have been featured in global outlets like CNN, BBC World News, Al Jazeera English, The New York Times, The Washington Post, The Economist, TIME, Newsweek, Rolling Stone, NPR, Fox News, MSNBC, ABC News, CBS News, NBC News, USA TODAY, and NBC News Meet The Press.

His opinion columns have appeared in major publications such as: CNN.com, USA Today, Houston Chronicle, Detroit Free Press, The Providence Journal, San Diego Union-Tribune, The Charlotte Observer, St. Louis Post-Dispatch, Kansas City Star, Miami Herald and Esquire Magazine (Middle East edition).

In March 2008, Arsalan was one of four international debaters selected to participate in The Doha Debates on BBC World Television. The Doha Debates are broadcast to over 300 million people worldwide on BBC World TV and its stage has been shared with the likes of Nobel Peace Prize winner Archbishop Desmond Tutu and former United States President Bill Clinton. Arsalan and his debate partner argued for the motion: "This House believes that Muslims are failing to do enough to combat extremism." He and his partner won the debate.

Additionally, Arsalan was cast as a movie extra in the Warner Brothers spy movie thriller Body of Lies (October 2008) starring Leonardo DiCaprio and Russell Crowe. Arsalan was also a contributing author to Taking Back Islam (Rodale Press), winner of the 2003 Wilbur Communications Award for Religion Book of the Year. In 2006, the French Ambassador to the United States personally selected Arsalan for the Personnalites d’Avenir (Personalities of the Future) World Leader Program in Paris sponsored by the French Foreign Ministry.

On January 19, 2015, Iftikhar said on MSNBC that Louisiana governor Bobby Jindal "might be trying to, you know, scrub some of the brown off his skin as he runs to the right in a Republican presidential exploratory bid." Iftikhar said this in reference to Jindal's statements about supposed Muslim "no-go zones" in Europe.

He has authored two major books that critically examine the rise of global anti-Muslim bigotry. In 2016, he published Scapegoats: How Islamophobia Helps Our Enemies & Threatens Our Freedoms, which was praised by former U.S. President Jimmy Carter as “an important book that shows Islamophobia must be addressed urgently.” In 2023, Iftikhar released Fear of a Muslim Planet: Global Islamophobia in the New World Order, a work that explores the global spread of Islamophobia, beginning with the 2019 Christchurch mosque attacks and addressing its ideological roots, including the Great Replacement conspiracy theory. The book critiques the Trump presidency’s role in normalizing anti-Muslim sentiment and draws attention to anti-Muslim policies and violence worldwide, including in China, Myanmar, and parts of Europe.

== Research and Advocacy on Islamophobia ==
Iftikhar once wrote about the 2022 American Muslim Poll from the Institute for Social Policy and Understanding (ISPU) which measured public endorsement of anti-Muslim stereotypes across different religious and non-religious groups in the U.S.

He noted with concern that American Muslims themselves scored relatively high on the Islamophobia Index (26 out of 100), an increase from previous years. The data showed that white Muslims, in particular, registered a significant rise in internalized Islamophobia. Iftikhar and academic sources associated this phenomenon with "internalized" bigotry, wherein members of marginalized groups adopt negative stereotypes about their own communities.

He also emphasized the disproportionate levels of religious discrimination experienced by American Muslims in multiple areas, including employment (37%), law enforcement (38%), air travel (44%), and healthcare (27%). Social media was identified as another domain where nearly half (46%) of American Muslims reported discriminatory experiences.

Despite these challenges, Iftikhar pointed to the optimism among American Muslims regarding the country’s future. In the 2022 ISPU poll, Muslims were found to be the most hopeful demographic group about the direction of the United States, with 48% expressing optimism—significantly higher than the general public and other religious groups.

== Views ==
=== Blasphemy and Muslim Responses ===
Throughout his professional career, Iftikhar has spoken out against violent reactions to perceived insults against Islam or the Prophet Muhammad. Referring to incidents such as the protests sparked by an anti-Muslim YouTube video in 2012, Iftikhar acknowledged that the material was designed to provoke, but argued that violent responses ultimately serve to reinforce negative stereotypes about Muslims. He attributed such reactions more to sociopolitical conditions—such as prolonged authoritarian rule and lack of freedom of speech—than to religious doctrine. Iftikhar emphasized the importance of responding to defamation with measured, peaceful means rather than violence.

=== Islamophobia in the United States ===
Iftikhar has been a vocal critic of anti-Muslim bigotry around the world. noted that Muslims report significantly higher rates of discrimination in employment, law enforcement, air travel, healthcare, and social media than non-Muslim people.

=== Media Representation and Public Discourse ===
Iftikhar has addressed issues of media bias and the double standards faced by Muslim public figures. He recounted a widely publicized 2015 CNN interview with anchor Don Lemon in which he was asked if he supported ISIS, despite his long-standing career in international human rights law and his categorical condemnation of terrorism throughout his career. He interpreted this question as a symptom of a broader trend in which Muslims are disproportionately asked to denounce acts of terrorism, unlike members of other faith groups when individuals of their religion commit similar acts.

He contended that conflating the actions of a minority of extremists with the global Muslim population perpetuates harmful stereotypes and serves the interests of terrorist groups by reinforcing the "clash of civilizations" narrative.

=== American Pluralism and Muslim Integration ===
Despite the challenges posed by Islamophobia, Iftikhar has expressed optimism about the future of Muslim integration in the United States. He pointed to the American Muslim Poll 2022 data, which showed that Muslims were the most optimistic demographic group regarding the country's direction. He interpreted this outlook as a sign of the resilience and growing civic engagement of American Muslims, as well as an indicator of their ongoing incorporation into the nation's social and political fabric.

=== Political Rhetoric and Scapegoating ===
In his broader commentary, Iftikhar has drawn historical parallels between contemporary Islamophobia and past scapegoating of other minority groups, such as Jewish people during the Nazi era and African Americans throughout American history, especially during the Jim Crow period. He argues that xenophobic political rhetoric contributes to the dehumanization of minorities and undermines democratic and pluralistic values. He calls for public accountability and a reaffirmation of inclusive principles to counteract the rise of intolerance around the world.

== Selected publications ==
- Iftikhar, Arsalan (September 8, 2011). Islamic Pacifism: Global Muslims in the Post-Osama Era. CreateSpace Independent Publishing Platform. p. 310. ISBN 978-1463553128.
- Iftikhar, Arsalan (2016). Scapegoats: How Islamophobia Helps Our Enemies and Threatens Our Freedoms. Reza Aslan (1st ed.). New York: Skyhorse Publishing Company, Incorporated. ISBN 978-1-5107-0579-1.
- Iftikhar, Arsalan (2021). Fear of a Muslim Planet: Global Islamophobia in the New World Order. New York: Skyhorse Publishing Company, Incorporated. ISBN 978-1-5107-6187-2.
- Iftikhar, Arsalan (February 5, 2018). Kahn, Hilary E.; Pennington, Rosemary (eds.). On Islam: Muslims and the Media. Indiana University Press. ISBN 978-0253032553.
