= Steve Inskeep =

American journalist, author, radio host (born 1968)

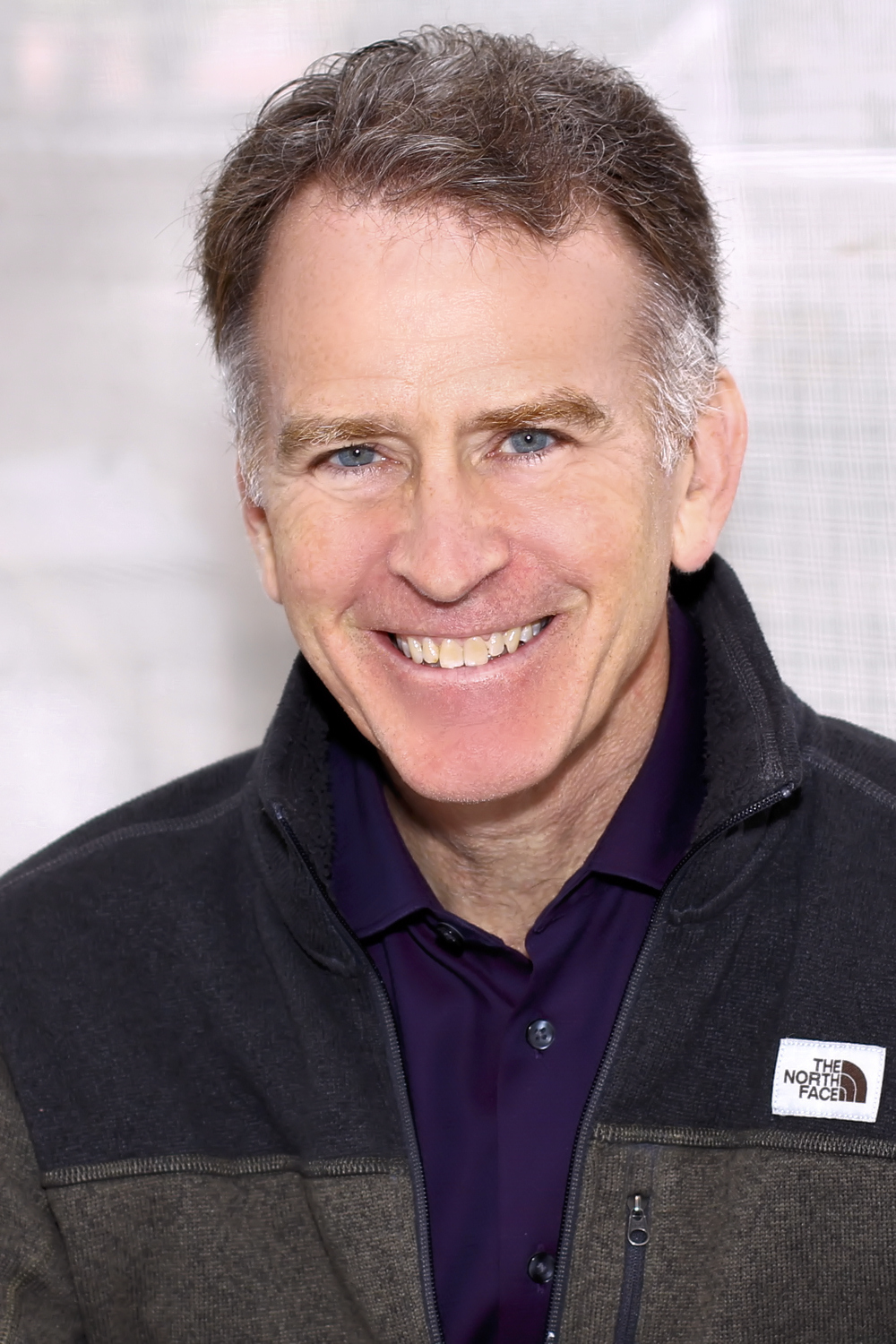
- Inskeep at the 2023 Texas Book Festival
- Born: Steven Alan Inskeep
- Education: Morehead State University
- Occupations: Radio host; author
- Spouse: Carolee Gabel (m. 1993)
- Children: 3
- Presenting career
- Show: Morning Edition
- Network: NPR
- Previous show: All Things Considered

Steven Alan Inskeep (/ˈɪnskiːp/) is an American journalist who is currently one of the four rotating hosts of Morning Edition and Up First on National Public Radio. Earlier in his career, Inskeep covered the Pentagon, the 2000 presidential campaign of George W. Bush, the U.S. Senate, and the wars in Afghanistan and Iraq; and was host of Weekend All Things Considered.

Inskeep is the author of four books: Instant City: Life and Death in Karachi (2011); Jacksonland: President Andrew Jackson, Cherokee Chief John Ross, and a Great American Land Grab (2015); Imperfect Union: How Jessie and John Fremont Mapped the West, Invented Celebrity, and Helped Cause the Civil War (2020); and Differ We Must: How Lincoln Succeeded in a Divided America (2023).

== Early life and education ==
Inskeep was raised in Carmel, Indiana, graduated from Carmel High School and graduated Phi Kappa Phi from Morehead State University in Morehead, Kentucky, in 1990. His first professional experience in radio was a stint as a sportscaster at WMKY-FM in Morehead.

== Career ==
=== NPR ===
Inskeep was hired by NPR in 1996. His first full-time assignment was the 1996 presidential primary in New Hampshire. Inskeep has been the host of Morning Edition since 2004.

In January 2022, Inskeep interviewed then-former U.S. President Donald Trump over the telephone. He asked questions on several topics, including COVID-19 vaccinations; the 2020 presidential election; and the future of the Republican Party in the 2022 midterm elections. When Inskeep pressed Trump about attempts to overturn the 2020 election and the 2021 United States Capitol attack, the former president suddenly hung up the phone.

== Notable work ==
Date	Title	Notes
2005	Oil Money Divides Nigeria	received a 2006 Robert F. Kennedy Journalism Award with other members of NPR
2009	Transcript: Obama's Full Interview With NPR	Barack Obama; Michele Norris
2009	Ahmadinejad: Holocaust 'Opinion Of Just A Few'	Mahmoud Ahmadinejad; Bijan Khajepour
2010	Along The Grand Trunk Road: Coming Of Age In India And Pakistan	Grand Trunk Road
2012	Revolutionary Road Trip	Arab Spring; Arab Spring concurrent incidents from Carthage to Cairo
2014	Borderland: Dispatches From The U.S.-Mexico Boundary	Mexico–United States border
2014	Transcript And Audio: President Obama's Full NPR Interview	at United States Military Academy after Commencement speech
2022	Phone interview with former President Donald Trump	

== Bibliography ==
Title	Year	Publisher	ISBN
Instant City: Life and Death in Karachi	2011	Penguin Press, NY	9781594203152
Jacksonland: President Andrew Jackson, Cherokee Chief John Ross, and a Great American Land Grab	2015	Penguin Press, NY	9781594205569
Imperfect Union: How Jessie and John Frémont Mapped The West, Invented Celebrity, and Helped Cause the Civil War	2020	Penguin Press, NY	9780735224353
Differ We Must: How Lincoln Succeeded in a Divided America	2023	Penguin Press, NY	9780593297865

== Personal life ==
Inskeep married Carolee Gabel in 1993. They have a daughter who was born in 2005. In 2012, they adopted a second child from China. Inskeep himself was also adopted. He and his family reside in Washington, D.C.

Media offices
Preceded by Bob Edwards	Host of Morning Edition; 2004-present (co-host with Renée Montagne (2004-2016), David Greene (2012-2020), Rachel Martin (2016-present)), and Noel King (2018-present)	Succeeded by incumbent
