= Lulu Garcia-Navarro =

American journalist (born 1970/71)

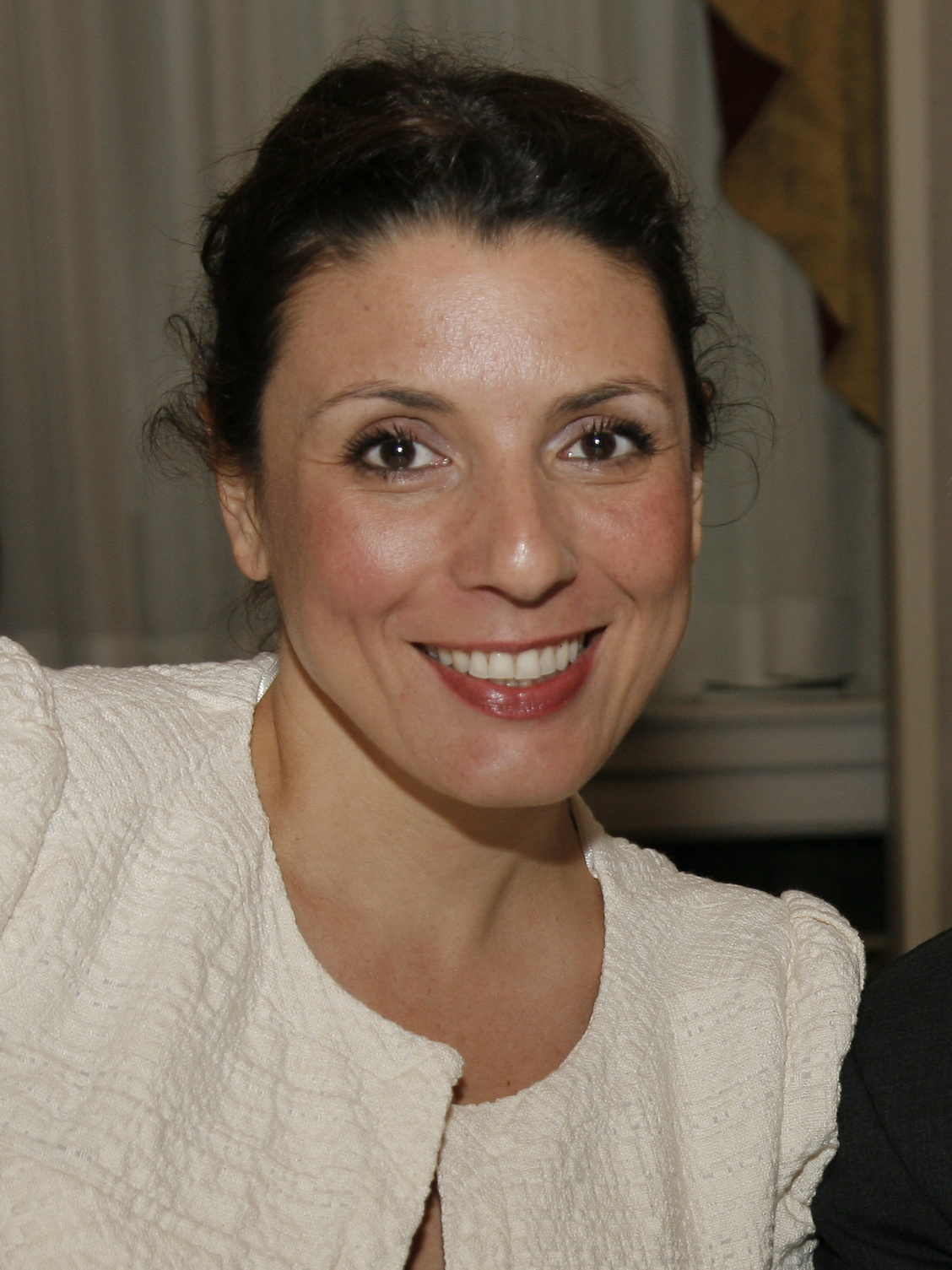
- Garcia-Navarro at the Peabody Awards in 2012
- Born: London, England
- Education: Georgetown University (BS); City University of London (MA)
- Occupation: Journalist
- Years active: 1999–present
- Spouse: James Hider

Lourdes Garcia-Navarro (also known as Lulu, London, 1972 or 1973) is a British-born American journalist who is an Opinion Audio podcast host for The New York Times. She was the host of National Public Radio's Weekend Edition Sunday from 2017 to 2021, when she left NPR after 17 years at the network.

Garcia-Navarro was previously a foreign correspondent and served as NPR's bureau chief in Mexico City, Baghdad, and Jerusalem, and opened the bureau in Rio de Janeiro. Her coverage of the Israeli-Palestinian conflict and dispatches of the Arab Spring uprisings brought Garcia-Navarro multiple awards in 2012, including the Edward R. Murrow and Peabody Awards for her coverage of the Libyan revolt. Her series on the Amazon rainforest was a Peabody finalist and won an Edward R. Murrow award for best news series.

== Early life and education ==
Garcia-Navarro was born in London, England, one of six children born to refugees from the 1959 Cuban Revolution. She states that her parents are of Cuban and Panamanian descent and her father died when she was five. She was raised in Miami. She earned a bachelor of science in international relations from Georgetown University and a master's degree in journalism from City University in London.

== Career ==
She started her career as a freelance journalist for the BBC World Service and Voice of America, traveling to Cuba, Syria, Panama, and several European countries on assignment for the two organizations.

She was hired by Associated Press Television News as a producer in 1999 and later worked for the news agency's radio division. AP dispatched Garcia-Navarro to Kosovo in 1999; Colombia in 2000; Afghanistan in 2001; Israel in 2002; and Iraq from 2002 to 2004.

Garcia-Navarro traveled to Iraq on assignment before the 2003 war and was among the few journalists that covered the invasion as a unilateral reporter.

Garcia-Navarro joined National Public Radio in November 2004 as Mexico City bureau chief. She moved to Baghdad in January 2008 and oversaw NPR's Iraq coverage for more than a year. In April 2009, she moved to Jerusalem to become bureau chief, a position that she held through to the end of 2012. She opened NPR's Brazil bureau in April 2013.

Garcia-Navarro was awarded the 2006 Daniel Schorr Journalism Prize for her work in Mexico and belonged to teams that received the 2005 Peabody Award and the 2007 Alfred I. DuPont-Columbia University Silver Baton Award recognizing NPR's Iraq coverage.

In February 2011, Garcia-Navarro was one of the first reporters to report from eastern Libya as the uprising was gaining strength and reported for months from rebel-held Benghazi, Tripoli, and the western mountains as rebel forces fought pitched battles against Col. Muammar Gaddafi's regime. Garcia-Navarro's front-line reports made her among the most praised journalists covering the Arab Spring.

Besides the Murrow and Peabody awards, she received the 2012 City University in London XCity Award, the Outstanding Correspondent Gracie Award, and the Overseas Press Club Lowell Thomas Award.

From her base in Brazil, Garcia-Navarro covered political protests, the Zika virus and the Olympics. She became the new regular host of NPR's Weekend Edition Sunday on January 8, 2017, and later complemented that role by co-hosting the Saturday edition of the network's Up First podcast with Weekend Edition Saturday host Scott Simon.

On September 9, 2021, she announced she would leave NPR as of October 17, 2021. The New York Times Company announced on September 30, 2021, that Garcia-Navarro would join its Opinion Audio team to anchor a new podcast to "explore the personal side of opinion". The podcast, First Person, debuted on June 9, 2022.

In April 2024, Garcia-Navarro became the co-host, with David Marchese, of the New York Times podcast The Interview, featuring a structure in which guests are interviewed twice over the course of a week while earlier in 2024, CNN had announced that she would become an on-air contributor across the network beginning with The Chris Wallace Show.

== Personal life ==
Garcia-Navarro is married to journalist James Hider, an editor at NPR. They have a daughter, Cassenia. In 2017, Garcia-Navarro became a U.S. citizen.

== Awards ==
- 2005: with colleagues, a Peabody Award.
- 2006: Daniel Schorr Journalism Prize, for reporting from Mexico.
- 2007: with colleagues, the Alfred I. DuPont-Columbia University Silver Baton Award recognizing NPR's Iraq coverage.
- 2011: Lowell Thomas Award of the Overseas Press Club.
- 2012: Edward R. Murrow Award of the Radio Television Digital News Association, for coverage of the Israeli-Palestinian conflict and vivid dispatches from the Arab Spring uprisings.
- 2012: Peabody Award, for coverage of the Libyan revolt.
- 2012: Gracie Award for Outstanding Correspondent.
- 2012: City University in London XCity Award, an alumni award for coverage of the Arab Spring.
- 2016: Margolin Family Distinguished Lecturer, and recipient, Estlow Center for Journalism and New Media Anvil of Freedom Award, University of Denver
- 2023: Honorary degree from Smith College.
