= Lightning Strike and Electrical Shock Survivors =

Non-profit support and advocacy group

Lightning Strike and Electrical Shock Survivors International (stylized as LS&ESS) is a non-profit advocacy and support group, particularly for victims of lightning strikes. Headquartered in Jacksonville, North Carolina, it has chapters throughout the United States and in more than 15 countries. It was founded in 1989 by Steve Marshburn Sr. As of 2026, there were about 2,000 members.

== See also ==
- Gretel Ehrlich Author of Match to the Heart: One Woman's Story of Being Struck by Lightning
