= Otto Eisenschiml =

American historian

- Born: June 16, 1880
- Died: December 7, 1963 (aged 83)

Otto Eisenschiml (June 16, 1880 – December 7, 1963) was an Austrian-born chemist and industrial executive in the American oil industry, and a controversial author. He may be best known for his provocative 1937 book on the assassination of Abraham Lincoln in which he proposed that a senior member of Lincoln's Cabinet orchestrated the plot to kill the president.

== Career ==
Eisenschiml was born in Austria. He attended the University of Vienna and obtained advanced degrees in chemistry. In 1901, he emigrated to the United States and took a job as an industrial chemist. He rose through the ranks to become president of the Scientific Oil Compounding Company. For much of his life, Eisenschiml lived in Chicago, Illinois.

He invented a window envelope made from one piece of paper. Later he developed a test to detect the presence of fish oil contaminants in vegetable oil. Eisenschiml was well published within the chemical and oil industries, authoring several articles in trade journals and magazines on various technical aspects of the business.

He became a student of American history, with a particular fascination for the Abraham Lincoln assassination. He began researching the murder in 1928, but was not satisfied with the prevailing account that John Wilkes Booth was the mastermind of the plot. In 1937, his signature work, Why was Lincoln Murdered?, was published to mixed reviews and a national furor. The resulting publicity resulted in good sales volumes. In it, he postulated that Secretary of War Edwin M. Stanton had plotted to kill Lincoln due to marked political and personal differences. He used circumstantial evidence to build his case, including Stanton's hiring of a bodyguard named John Parker to protect the president (Parker was temporarily absent when assassin Booth entered the presidential box at Ford's Theater).

Eisenschiml also speculated that Stanton had deliberately left one key bridge across the Anacostia River open, the same bridge Booth actually used to escape, and that he ordered Booth to be shot and killed by the Union Army. Another controversial suggestion was that Stanton tore several incriminating pages from Booth's diary. The book sparked other books and conspiracy theories, as well as some films. His theories have become popularly known as the "Eisenschiml Thesis," but have generally been discredited by leading historians.

== Publications ==
- Why was Lincoln Murdered? (1937)
- The Shadow of Lincoln's Death (1940)
- Reviewers Reviewed: A Challenge to Historical Critics (1940)
- Without Fame: The Romance of a Profession (1942)
- The Case of A.L. ___, Aged 56 (1943)
- The Story of Shiloh (1946)
- The American Iliad: The Epic Story of the Civil War as Narrated by Eyewitnesses and Contemporaries (1947) - with Ralph Newman
- As Luck Would Have It (1948)
- The Celebrated Case of Fitz John Porter: An American Dreyfus Affair (1950)
- The Civil War (1956) - with Ralph Newman and E.B. Long
- Why the Civil War? (1958)
- Eyewitness: The Civil War as We Lived It (1960) revised version of The American Iliad
- The Hidden Face of the Civil War (1961)
- O.E.: Historian Without an Armchair (1963)

== In popular culture ==
Otto Eisenschiml's first book on the assassination inspired the 1942 Broadway play Yours, A. Lincoln. His theory, or one derived from it, was mentioned by the fictional detective Steve Crosetti in an episode of Homicide: Life on the Street. Edward Hyam's book, Killing No Murder, which studied a number of assassinations, accepted this theory, with the added error of supposing Secretaries Seward and Stanton to be next in line after the Vice President.

Eisenschiml's book is also referenced in the 2007 Disney film National Treasure: Book of Secrets, when it is mentioned by a precocious child during a scene at the White House Easter egg roll. Similar to the book, the film's premise was partially inspired by pages missing from John Wilkes Booth's diary.
