= Bob Edwards =

American journalist (1947–2024)

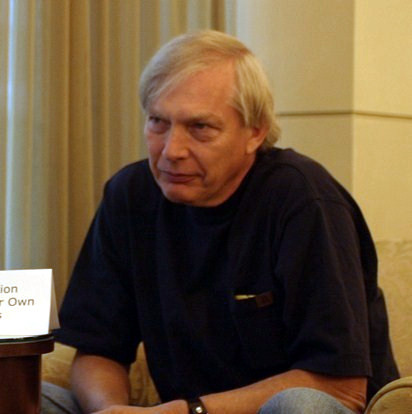
- Edwards in 2005
- Born: Robert Alan Edwards; May 16, 1947; Louisville, Kentucky, U.S.
- Died: February 10, 2024 (aged 76); Arlington, Virginia, U.S.
- Spouses: Joan Murphy; Sharon Kelly; Windsor Johnston (m. 2011)
- Children: 2
- Presenting career
- Show: The Bob Edwards Show
- Network: XM Satellite Radio
- Time slot: Monday through Friday 8–9 AM ET
- Show: Bob Edwards Weekend
- Network: Public Radio International
- Time slot: Saturday 8–9 AM ET
- Country: United States
- Previous show: NPR Morning Edition
- Website: www.bobedwardsradio.com

Robert Alan Edwards (May 16, 1947 – February 10, 2024) was an American broadcast journalist who was a Peabody Award-winning member of the National Radio Hall of Fame. He hosted both of National Public Radio's flagship news programs, the afternoon All Things Considered, and Morning Edition, where he was the first and longest serving host in the latter program's history. Starting in 2004, Edwards hosted The Bob Edwards Show on Sirius XM Radio and Bob Edwards Weekend distributed by Public Radio International to more than 150 public radio stations. Those programs ended in September 2015.

== Early life, family and education ==
Edwards was born in Louisville, Kentucky, to a homemaking mother and an accountant father. He became interested in radio, and pursuing a radio career, from a young age.

Edwards was a graduate of St. Xavier High School in 1965 and the University of Louisville in 1969. He also earned an M.A. in communication from American University in Washington, D.C., graduating in 1972.

== Career ==
=== Early career ===
Edwards began his radio career in 1968 at a small radio station in New Albany, Indiana, a small city located across the Ohio River from Louisville, his hometown. Afterwards, Edwards served in the U.S. Army during the Vietnam War, producing and anchoring television and radio news programs for the American Forces Korea Network from Seoul. Following his army service, he went on to anchor news for WTOP / 1500, a CBS affiliate, in Washington, D.C. In 1972, at age 25, Edwards anchored national newscasts for the Mutual Broadcasting System.

Edwards joined NPR in 1974 as a newscaster. Before hosting Morning Edition, Edwards was co-host of All Things Considered.

=== Host of Morning Edition ===
Edwards hosted NPR's flagship program, Morning Edition, from the show's inception in November 1979 until April 2004. After 24 plus years with Edwards as host, Arbitron ratings showed that, with 13 million listeners, it was the second highest-rated radio broadcast in the country, behind only Rush Limbaugh's AM show. Prior to his departure, he was very popular among both listeners and critics.

When Morning Edition and its host won a George Foster Peabody Award in 1999, the Peabody committee lauded Edwards as

a man who embodies the essence of excellence in radio. His reassuring and authoritative voice is often the first many Americans hear each day. His is a rare radio voice: informed but never smug; intimate but never intrusive; opinionated but never dismissive. Mr. Edwards does not merely talk, he listens.

Edwards' skills as an interviewer were widely praised. NPR's ombudsman Jeffrey Dvorkin said, "If I were his producer, I would think of Edwards as NPR's version of Charlie Rose." The New York Daily News called him "an institution among Morning Edition listeners for his interviewing skills and his calm, articulate style". It is estimated that Edwards conducted over 20,000 interviews for NPR. His subjects ranged from major politicians to authors and celebrities. His weekly call-in chats with retired sportscaster Red Barber are fondly remembered. The chats were supposedly about sports, but often digressed into topics like the Gulf War, what kind of flowers were blooming at Barber's Tallahassee, Florida home, or other non-sport subjects. Barber would call Edwards "Colonel Bob," referring to Edwards' Kentucky Colonel honor from his native state.

=== Departure from NPR ===
In April 2004, NPR executives decided to "freshen up" Morning Edition's sound. Edwards was removed as host, replaced with Steve Inskeep and Renée Montagne, and reassigned as a senior correspondent for NPR News. The move took him by surprise. "I'd rather stay," he said, "but it's not my decision to make".

At first, NPR executives and spokespersons did not fully explain the move, leaving many listeners confused. Eventually they did make some attempts to explain themselves. According to NPR spokeswoman Laura Gross, "It's part of a natural evolution. A new host will bring new ideas and perspectives to the show. Bob's voice will still be heard; he'll still be a tremendous influence on the show. We just felt it was time for a change".

Executive Vice President Ken Stern also explained the move. "This change in Morning Edition is part of the ongoing evaluation of all NPR programming that has taken place over the last several years. We've looked at shows like All Things Considered and Talk of the Nation with an eye to how we can best serve listeners in the future."

The decision to remove Edwards, made shortly before his 25th anniversary with the show, was met with much criticism by listeners. Jeffrey Dvorkin, NPR's ombudsman, reported that the network received over 50,000 letters and emails, most of them angry, regarding Edwards' demotion; the listener reaction was the largest reaction on a single subject that NPR had received to that date. Other journalists, including ABC's Cokie Roberts and CBS's Charles Osgood, expressed dissatisfaction with the move.

His final broadcast as host was on April 30, 2004; his last Morning Edition interview was with Charles Osgood, who had also been Edwards' first Morning Edition interview subject almost 25 years earlier.

Edwards decided not to remain at NPR as a senior correspondent and filed only one story, an interview with Bob Dole and other Senate veterans of World War II about the Washington, DC, World War II memorial, in that role. Three months after his departure from Morning Edition, XM Satellite Radio announced that he had signed on to host a new program, The Bob Edwards Show, for its new XM Public Radio channel.

=== Sirius XM Satellite Radio ===
After leaving NPR, XM Satellite Radio offered Edwards a show so, according to Edwards, "I can continue to host and be heard every day instead of occasionally, as I would have been at NPR". He said the format would be "loose": "It'll be long interviews, short interviews, and then maybe departments... You've got to have the news ... it's not going to be all features, yet it's not going to be the Financial Times, either." The Bob Edwards Show's first broadcast was on October 4, 2004. Washington Post columnist David Broder and former CBS News anchor Walter Cronkite were Edwards' first guests.

While continuing his daily show on XM, Edwards returned to public radio stations in January 2006 with his show Bob Edwards Weekend, produced by XM Satellite Radio and distributed by Public Radio International to affiliate stations around the country. A September 22, 2005 press release from PRI states, "Bob Edwards Weekend will provide PRI listeners with an opportunity to sample some of the astute commentary and intriguing interviews offered to XM subscribers each weekday on The Bob Edwards Show." This was the first time that a satellite radio company provided programming to over-the-air terrestrial radio. (Note: Bob Edwards Weekend episodes are no longer available via podcast at "BobEdwardsRadio.com". Archived from the original on September 4, 2010. Visitors to the page "www.bobedwardsradio.com/ways-to-listen". Archived from the original on August 6, 2012. will see the message "The Bob Edwards Weekend podcast is no longer available. Our sincerest apologies to our devoted listeners.")

The Bob Edwards Show received several awards, including: the Deems Taylor Award from ASCAP (2006), a Gabriel Award from the Catholic Academy for Communication Arts Professionals (2006), The National Press Club's Robert L. Kozic Award for Environmental Reporting (2007) for the documentary, "Exploding Heritage", about mountaintop-removal coal mining. That program was also honored with a Gabriel Award, a 2006 New York Festivals Gold World Medal, and an award from the Society of Environmental Journalists.

In 2008, The Bob Edwards Show received an Edward R. Murrow Award from the Radio-Television News Directors Association and a New York Festivals / United Nations Gold Award for the documentary, "The Invisible: Children without homes". "The Invisible" also was honored by the Journalism Center for Children and Families and by the Catholic Academy for Communication Arts Professionals.

In 2009, the show received a Sigma Delta Chi Award from the Society of Professional Journalists for the documentary, Stories from Third Med: Surviving a Jungle ER. The documentary also received a Gabriel Award. In September 2012, Edwards was named a Fellow of the Society of Professional Journalists. In 2013, the program was awarded a Robert F. Kennedy Journalism Award for the documentary, "An Occupational Hazard: Rape in the military". The show's last live episode aired on September 26, 2014.

=== AARP podcast ===
In July 2018, Edwards joined with AARP to host a podcast, Take On Today, which was published most Thursdays. The program covered topics of health, work, money, aging, and entertainment, including interviews and panel discussions of issues relevant to older Americans.

== Personal life ==
Edwards was married three times. His marriages to Joan Murphy and Sharon Kelly ended in divorce. He had two daughters, Eleanor and Susannah, with Sharon Kelly. He married NPR news anchor Windsor Johnston in 2011, with whom he remained until his death.

Bob Edwards died on February 10, 2024, at the age of 76, in Arlington, Virginia. His cause of death was reported to be from metastatic bladder cancer and heart failure.

== Awards and legacy ==
In 1999, Edwards won a Peabody Award.

In 2003, Edwards was inducted into the Kentucky Journalism Hall of Fame. In November 2004, Edwards was inducted into the National Radio Hall of Fame.

He donated his papers and his library to American University in Washington, DC.

He held honorary degrees from the University of Louisville, Spalding University, Bellarmine University, Willamette University, Grinnell College, DePaul University, the University of St. Francis, and Albertson College (later the College of Idaho).

== Publications ==
Edwards wrote three books.

His first book, Fridays with Red: A Radio Friendship, was based on his weekly interviews with Red Barber, and was released in 1993, a year after Barber's death.

During his final months at NPR, Edwards wrote his second book, Edward R. Murrow and the Birth of Broadcast Journalism, which was published in May 2004. The book, a short biography of Edward R. Murrow, brought some public attention to history's most noted broadcast journalist prior to the release of the 2004 film Good Night and Good Luck.

His memoir, A Voice in the Box, was published in September 2011.

== See also ==
- List of people from the Louisville metropolitan area

== Explanatory footnotes ==
Media offices
Preceded by None	Host of Morning Edition; 1979–2004	Succeeded by Steve Inskeep and Renée Montagne
