= A Martínez =

American journalist, radio host (born 1968)

- Born: George Martínez
- Occupation: Radio host
- Presenting career
- Show: Morning Edition
- Network: NPR
- Previous shows: Take Two (2012–2021); In the Zone (2007–2012)

George Louis "A" Martínez is an American journalist who is currently a host of Morning Edition on National Public Radio. He joined Morning Edition in July 2021. Prior to being host of Morning Edition, Martínez hosted Take Two at KPCC and In the Zone for ESPN Radio on KSPN (AM).

== Early life ==
George (or Jorge) Louis Martínez was born to Ecuadorian immigrants and raised in the Koreatown area of Los Angeles. He was named for Jorge Luis Borges, his grandfather's favorite author. Though his mother calls him Jorge, George is the name on his birth certificate.

He attended Daniel Murphy High School and Los Angeles City College, earning a bachelor's degree in journalism at California State University, Northridge in 1995.

== Career ==
Martínez began working in radio as a board operator for XTRA 690, relaying the San Diego–Tijuana station's signal from the Fallbrook Center to the San Fernando Valley. His nickname, "A," comes from that time, when host Steve Mason would address him as "Hey, Martínez!"

After a stint as a movie theater manager, Martínez returned to radio with KXTA in Los Angeles. Following the station's acquisition of the rights to the Los Angeles Dodgers baseball broadcasts in 1997, Martínez served as the Dodgers radio beat host for ten years. He next worked for ESPN Radio station KSPN in Los Angeles, where he served as the Los Angeles Lakers pregame and postgame host and co-hosted the show In the Zone with Brian Long.

In 2012, public radio station KPCC tapped Martínez to join The Madeleine Brand Show, which was renamed to Brand & Martínez on August 20, 2012, in part as part of the "One Nation Media Project," an effort to increase the station's racial diversity and attract Latino listeners. A month into the rebranded show, Madeleine Brand left KPCC. With new cohost Alex Cohen, the show was renamed Take Two. Martínez and Cohen co-hosted Take Two for four years until Cohen became the station's local host of Morning Edition in 2017. Martínez continued to host Take Two until the show's end in 2021 with his departure from KPCC after being named the new co-host of Morning Edition and the podcast Up First, filling the position vacated by David Greene.
