= Civil War Roundtable =

Independent organizations

Civil War Roundtables (also referred to as "Round Tables" or "CWRTs") are independent organizations that share a common objective in promoting and expanding interest in the study of the military, political and sociological history of the American Civil War.

== History ==
The movement originated in Chicago, where the Civil War Round Table of Chicago was founded in December 1940 by a group of Civil War enthusiasts led by Abraham Lincoln scholar Ralph G. Newman. The Chicago organization is generally regarded as the first Civil War Round Table and served as a model for similar groups established throughout the United States and Canada. Over time, hundreds of local round tables were formed, each operating independently while sharing a common interest in Civil War history and preservation.

== Activities ==
Most Civil War Round Tables hold regular meetings featuring lectures, discussions, and presentations by historians, authors, educators, park rangers, and preservationists. Many organizations also sponsor battlefield tours, preservation initiatives, book programs, and educational events related to the American Civil War. Membership structures and activities vary by organization, but most groups share the goal of promoting public interest in Civil War history and scholarship.

== Civil War Round Table Congress ==
The Civil War Round Table Congress is a nonprofit organization that provides resources and support to local Civil War Round Tables. Rather than serving as a governing body, it functions as a resource center that promotes communication and the sharing of best practices among independent round tables. The organization hosts conferences and educational programs focused on membership development, leadership, and long-term sustainability.

== Publications ==
Several publications have focused on the administration and development of Civil War Round Tables. In 2013, Matthew Borowick published The Civil War Round Table Handbook, a guide intended for round table leaders and organizers. Borowick has also written extensively on the subject in Civil War News.
