= Neal Conan =

American radio journalist (1949–2021)

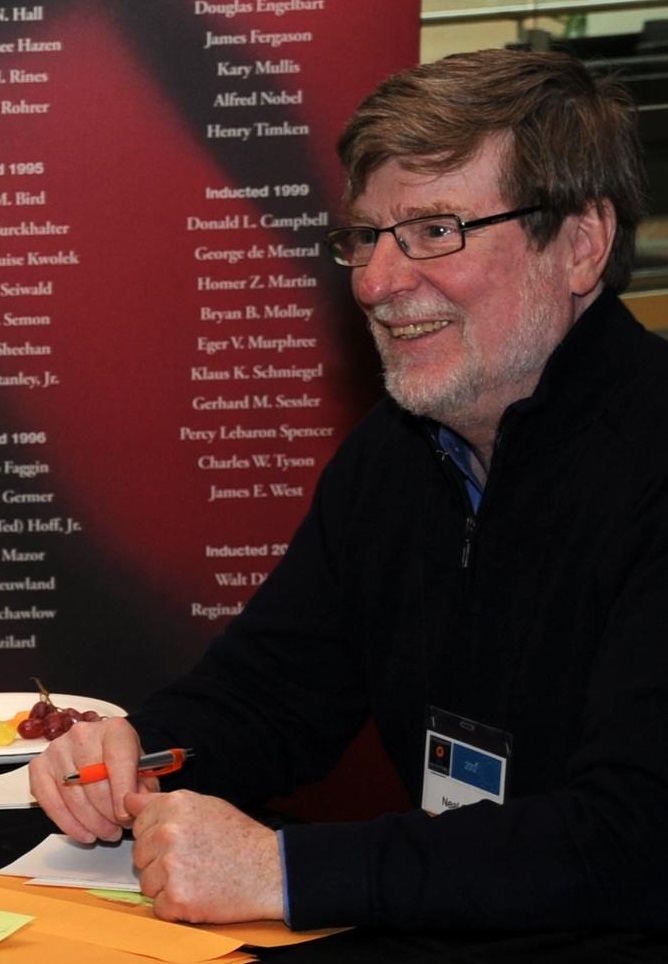
- Conan in 2012
- Born: Neal Joseph Conan III; November 26, 1949; Beirut, Lebanon
- Died: August 10, 2021 (aged 71); Hawi, Hawaii, U.S.
- Occupation: Journalist
- Notable credit(s): All Things Considered; Talk of the Nation
- Spouses: Liane Hansen (m. 1982; div. 2011) Gretel Ehrlich (m. 2019)
- Children: 2

Neal Joseph Conan III (November 26, 1949 – August 10, 2021) was an American radio journalist, producer, editor, and correspondent. He worked for National Public Radio for more than 36 years and was the senior host of its talk show Talk of the Nation. Conan hosted Talk of the Nation from 2001 to June 27, 2013, when the program was discontinued; with the discontinuation, NPR announced that Conan would depart the network.

== Early life ==
Conan was born in Beirut, Lebanon, on November 26, 1949. His father, Neal Jr., worked as a physician and headed the medical center at the American University of Beirut; his mother, Theodora (Blake), was a housewife. His family relocated to Saudi Arabia when Conan was a child, before moving to New Jersey and Manhattan. He studied at Loomis Chaffee School and Riverdale Country School.

== Career ==
Conan entered the field of radio broadcasting at age 17, volunteering at Pacifica Radio station WBAI-FM in New York City. He then worked at public radio station WRVR-FM, where he met Robert Siegel. At 27, Conan joined National Public Radio. Conan's initial assignment for NPR was as a producer of All Things Considered. Later, he covered the White House, the Pentagon, and the Department of State for the network.

During the 1991 Gulf War, the Iraqi Republican Guard detained Conan for a week. He and Chris Hedges of The New York Times were reporting on a Shi'a rebellion centered in Basra, Iraq. For five years, Conan hosted Weekly Edition: The Best of NPR News.

In 2000, Conan took a break from his work as a broadcaster to serve as the stadium play-by-play baseball announcer for Aberdeen Arsenal. A year later, he published Play by Play: Baseball, Radio and Life in the Last Chance League, which described his experience. On September 10, 2001, Conan began his work as host of Talk of the Nation. In 2008, investigative reporter James Ridgeway covered the Democratic primary elections for Mother Jones—in one episode, Mike Gravel was filmed in New Hampshire during a phone interview with Conan for Talk of the Nation.

NPR announced that it was ending the 12-year run of Talk of the Nation on March 29, 2013, stating that Conan would "step away from the rigors of daily journalism." On February 12, 2014, an interview aired on KUAZ 89.1, Tucson, Arizona's NPR affiliate, during which Conan explained that ending Talk of the Nation was not a decision he was involved in or agreed with, citing its status as one of NPR's most popular shows. He went on to join Hawaii Public Radio as a news analyst on June 8, 2014. He produced a thrice-weekly series called Pacific News Minute between November 30, 2017, and October 31, 2019.

In January 2017, Conan launched a radio show and podcast entitled Truth, Politics, and Power, which focused on the first presidency of Donald Trump. Conan interviewed experts weekly about a different issue arising from the 2016 election and the president's administration.

== Personal life ==
In 1982, Conan married Liane Hansen, a long-time host of NPR's Weekend Edition Sunday. Together, they had two children: Connor and Casey. Hansen briefly co-hosted Talk of the Nation with Conan. While on a farewell tour of NPR stations, Hansen revealed in April 2011 that she and Conan were divorcing. Conan was later in a domestic partnership with American travel writer, poet, and essayist Gretel Ehrlich, who survived him at his death. They married in 2019.

Conan moved to Hawi, Hawaii after he left NPR and farmed macadamia nuts on 5.5 acres of land. He enjoyed scuba diving after he settled in Hawaii.

Conan was a friend of comics writer Chris Claremont. As a result, he was featured a number of times as a sympathetic journalist in stories Claremont wrote for Marvel Comics and DC Comics, such as the 1988 X-Men storyline "The Fall of the Mutants". which often featured real life NPR engineer Manoli Wetherell as his cameraman.

Conan died on August 10, 2021, on his farm in Hāwī, Hawaii, as a result of glioblastoma, according to his son Connor. He was 71, having been diagnosed with a glioblastoma on his 70th birthday in November 2019.

== Awards ==
- Major Armstrong Award
- 3 Alfred I. duPont-Columbia University Awards
- George Foster Peabody Award

During his time at All Things Considered, it won many awards as well, including the Washington Journalism Review's Best in the Business Award.

== Publications ==
- Conan, Neal (2002). Play by Play: Baseball, Radio, and Life in the Last Chance League (First ed.). New York: Crown Publishers. ISBN 0-609-60871-1.
