= Margolin (disambiguation) =

Margolin is a surname.

Margolin may also refer to:

- 2561 Margolin, a main-belt asteroid
- MCM pistol or Margolin, a Russian sport pistol
- Margolin Hebrew Academy, a co-educational Elementary School in East Memphis, Tennessee
- Morton Margolin Prize for Distinguished Business Reporting, an award for reporting in business journalism
