= The Bob Edwards Show =

2004–2014 American radio program

- Genre: Talk
- Running time: 1 hour per episode, Monday through Friday
- Country of origin: US
- Home station: XM Public Radio; XM 121; Sirius 205
- Syndicates: Public Radio International
- Starring: Bob Edwards
- Created by: Bob Edwards
- Executive producer: Ed McNulty
- Original release: 2004 – September 26, 2014
- Website: bobedwardsradio.com

The Bob Edwards Show was an American radio program broadcast from 2004 to 2014 by Sirius XM Satellite Radio every weekday morning, with encore re-broadcasts throughout the day/evening and before the next morning's show. The program was heard on the Sirius XM Public Radio station at XM channel 121 and Sirius channel 205, and was also available on XM Radio Online and Sirius Internet Radio.

== Description and history ==
The show's host and namesake, Bob Edwards, was a Peabody Award-winning member of the National Radio Hall of Fame. Edwards was once the co-host of National Public Radio's All Things Considered and hosted NPR's Morning Edition for "nearly 25 years" from the first episode to April 30, 2004 when he was reassigned to another position within NPR, despite email objections from more than 50,000 listeners. Edwards left his new assignment almost immediately, as Hugh Panero, CEO of XM Radio, offered Edwards a daily show.

The Bob Edwards Show continued the tradition of interviewing interesting people in all walks of life that Edwards exemplified on Morning Edition, but now in long form. Edwards told the NewsHour with Jim Lehrer's Terrance Smith, "The longest interview I could do on the air for Morning Edition was eight minutes. Now I can interview someone for up to an hour. So it's a freer, more open, more relaxed and enjoyable conversation. The program's really about conversation." The show's first broadcast was on October 4, 2004, staffed by experienced public radio veterans. The first program included weekly political commentator Washington Post columnist David S. Broder, USA Today Supreme Court reporter Joan Biskupic, former CBS News anchor Walter Cronkite, and Eugene Robinson, author of Last Dance in Havana. Additional guests included US President Jimmy Carter, activist Ralph Nader, historian Simon Schama, journalist Mike Wallace, musician Bonnie Raitt, and basketball coach Phil Jackson.

Sirius XM Radio also produced the compilation program Bob Edwards Weekend, distributed by Public Radio International for use by "terrestrial" public radio stations. It premiered on January 7–8, 2006, consisting of re-edited interviews from the weekday program.

The show's last live episode aired on September 26, 2014. Public Radio International, which paid Sirius XM to broadcast the show on weekends, continued to air reruns, but no longer does.

== Awards and recognition ==
In 2006, interviews with musicians earned The Bob Edwards Show the Deems Taylor Award from ASCAP. The program received a Gabriel Award from the Catholic Academy for Communication Arts Professionals (CACAP) for an interview with Father Gregory Boyle, a Jesuit priest who works with Latino gang members in east Los Angeles. The show earned its second Gabriel Award in 2007 for Exploding Heritage, a documentary about mountaintop removal coal mining in Appalachia. Exploding Heritage also received the National Press Club's Robert L. Kozic Award for environmental reporting, a New York Festivals Gold World Medal for best program on the environment, and an award from the Society of Environmental Journalists.

In 2008, the show received an Edward R. Murrow Award from the Radio-Television News Directors Association and a New York Festivals/United Nations Gold Award for a documentary, The Invisible: Children Without Homes. The documentary also was honored by the Journalism Center on Children and Families and by the CACAP. In 2009, the show received a Sigma Delta Chi Award from the Society of Professional Journalists for the documentary Stories from Third Med: Surviving a Jungle ER. The documentary also earned the show its third Gabriel Award. In 2013, Bob's program was awarded a Robert F. Kennedy Journalism Award for the documentary, An Occupational Hazard: Rape in the Military.

== Personnel ==
=== Host ===
- Bob Edwards (2004–2014)

=== Executive producer ===
- Mark Schramm (2004–2005)
- Tish Valva (2005–2007)
- Steve Lickteig (2007–2011)
- Ed McNulty (2011–2014)

=== Production staff ===
- Dan Bloom
- Chad Campbell
- Andy Danyo Kubis
- Ed McNulty
- Cristy Meiners
- Ariana Pekary
- Geoffrey Redick
- Shelley Tillman
- Kim Dawson
