= B. J. Leiderman =

American composer

Bernard Jay Leiderman (born February 14, 1956) is an American composer and songwriter. He is best-known for his theme music compositions for public radio programs, including National Public Radio's Morning Edition, Weekend Edition, Wait Wait... Don't Tell Me!, Science Friday, and American Public Media's Marketplace.

Leiderman attended Virginia Tech from 1973-74. He became a camera person at WTAR-TV (now WTKR) in Norfolk, Virginia. He later studied broadcast journalism under Ed Bliss at American University in Washington, D.C. Leiderman's Morning Edition theme music was used for 40 years, from the show's first broadcast on November 5, 1979 until May 3, 2019, when the theme was replaced by a new arrangement composed by Man-Made Music of New York City.

In 2012, Leiderman moved to Asheville, NC where he recorded and released his debut album "BJ" (2016) The album was recorded at Echo Mountain Studios in Asheville, NC. The album was produced by Eric Sarafin (a.k.a. Mixerman) and features The Randall Bramblett Band and appearances by special guest artist Béla Fleck.

Scott Simon, who hosts Weekend Edition Saturday, acknowledges Leiderman each week in an unusual way, as something of an “Easter egg” for listeners.
