= Renée Montagne =

American journalist

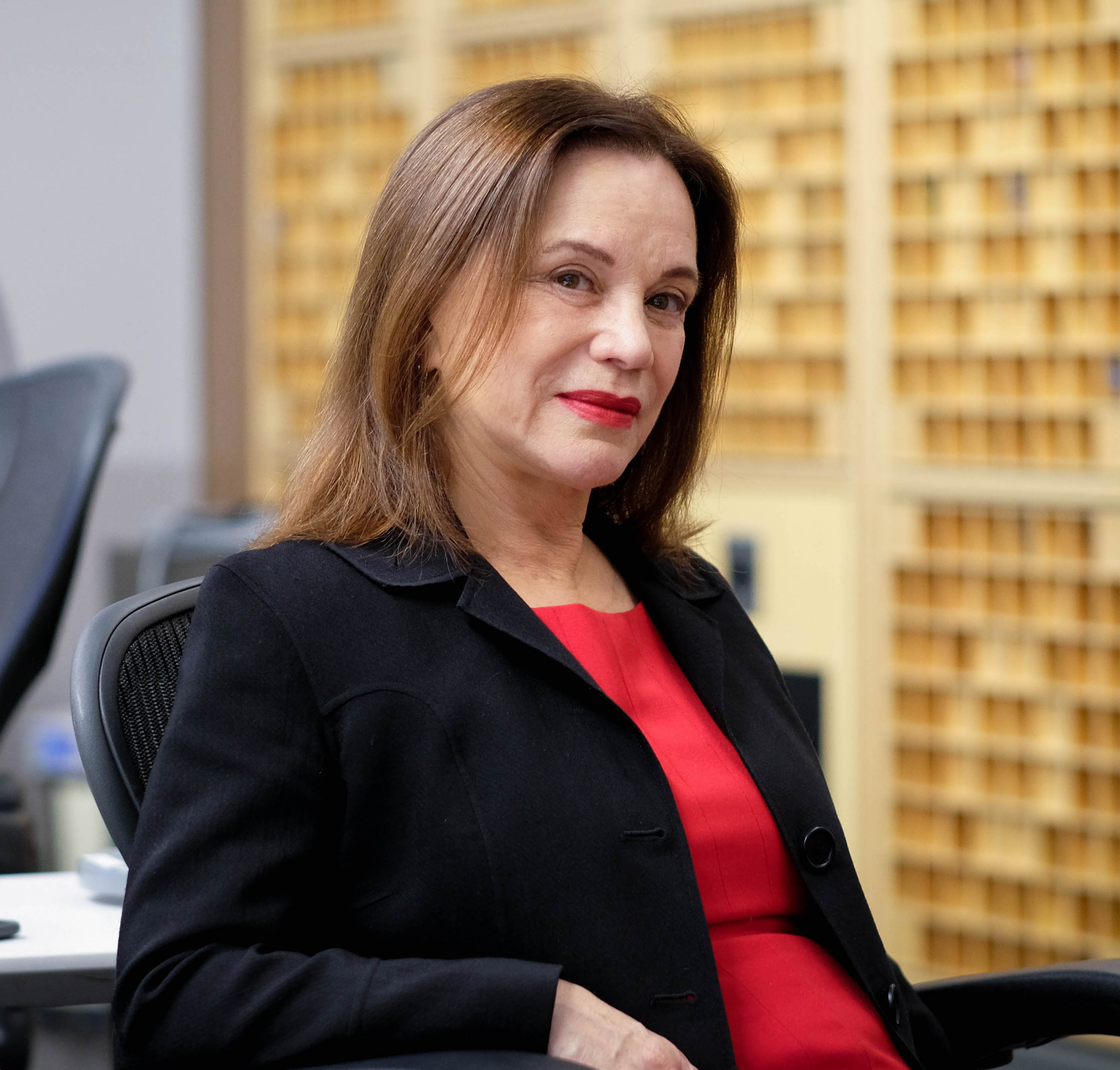
- Montagne in 2019
- Born: December 1948 (age 77); Oceanside, California, United States
- Education: University of California, Berkeley
- Occupations: retired NPR correspondent and host
- Years active: 1973–2025

Renée Montagne (/mɒnˈteɪn/) is an American former radio journalist and was the co-host (with Steve Inskeep and David Greene) of National Public Radio's weekday morning news program, Morning Edition, from May 2004 to November 11, 2016. Montagne and Inskeep succeeded longtime host Bob Edwards, initially as interim replacements, and Greene joined the team in 2012. Montagne had served as a correspondent and occasional host since 1989. She usually broadcast from NPR West in Culver City, California, a Los Angeles suburb.

== Early life ==
Montagne was born in December 1948 in Oceanside, California, into a Marine Corps family. As is common in the lives of children of career military families, she moved often while growing up, including living in Hawaii and various places on the West Coast. An alumna of Cupertino High School, she was inducted into the school's Hall of Fame in 2012. She graduated Phi Beta Kappa from the University of California, Berkeley in 1973 with a degree in English.

== Career ==
Montagne got her start in radio as news director for KPOO community radio in San Francisco while attending UC–Berkeley. She also worked for Pacific News Service in San Francisco.

From 1980 through 1986, she worked in New York City as a freelance reporter and producer for both NPR and the Canadian Broadcasting Corporation. During this period, she covered the arts and science for NPR. From 1987 to 1989, she was co-host with Robert Siegel of NPR's evening news magazine, All Things Considered.

In 1990, Montagne covered the release of Nelson Mandela from prison in South Africa. She remained in South Africa for three years focusing on the area, where she won, along with the NPR reporting team, the Alfred I. duPont-Columbia University Award for their coverage of South Africa's first fully democratic elections.

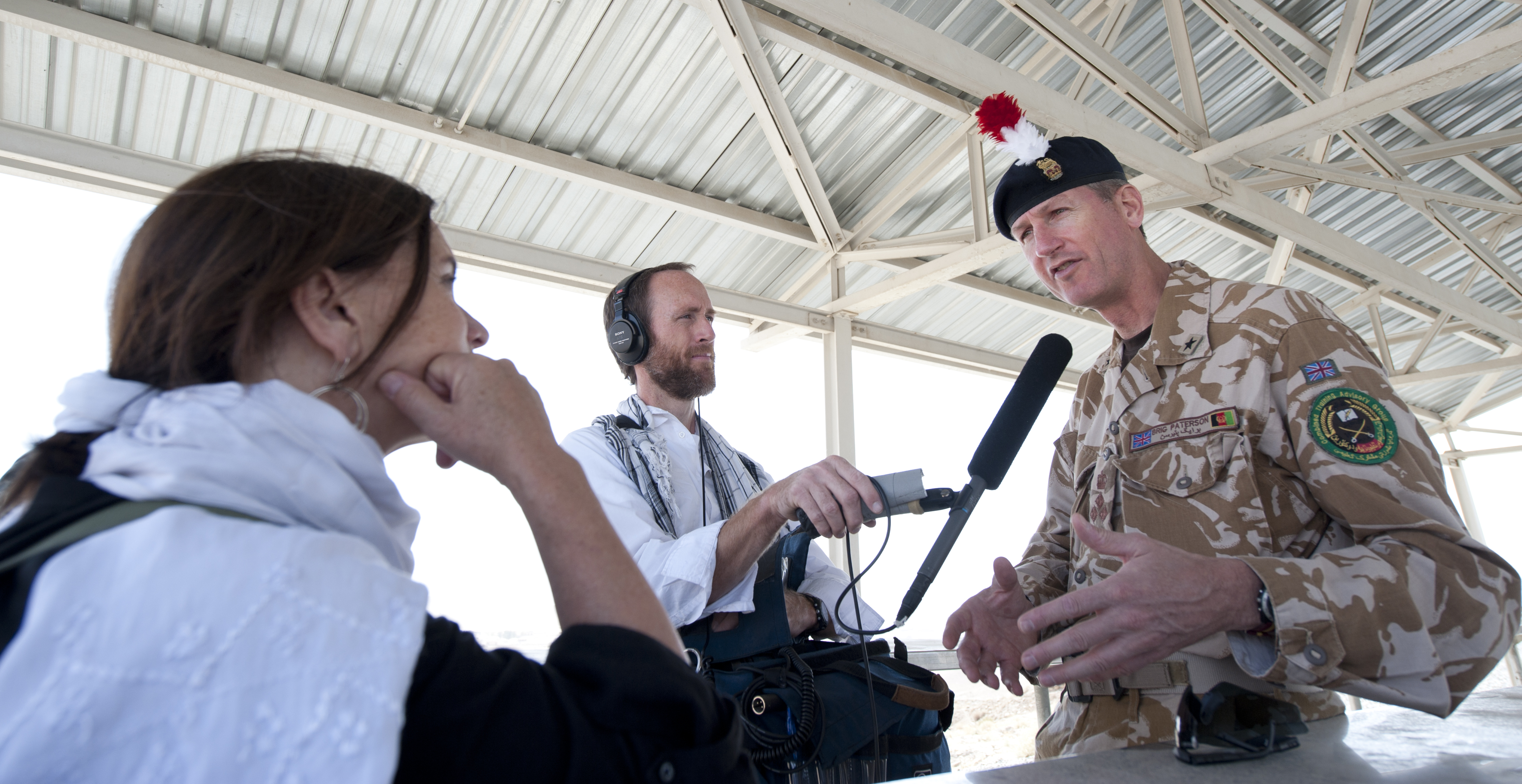
Montagne (far left) interviewing British Brigadier General David Paterson in Kabul, Afghanistan, in 2010

In May 2004, Montagne and Steve Inskeep became interim co-hosts for NPR's Morning Edition, replacing long-time host Bob Edwards who was reassigned as a senior correspondent. They became permanent co-hosts in December 2004.

The following year, Montagne went to Rome to cover the funeral of Pope John Paul II for NPR's Morning Edition. She also has traveled frequently to Afghanistan to report on the war that began in 2001. She has been recognized by the Overseas Press Club for her work from Afghanistan.

In 2011, Montagne was among the news anchors who attended the traditional off-the-record luncheon with the U.S. president (in this case, Barack Obama) in advance of his State of the Union Address.

The announcement went public on July 18, 2016, that Montagne would be leaving NPR's Morning Edition after co-hosting it with Steve Inskeep for 12 years.

Her final Morning Edition as co-host was November 11, 2016. A month later, as Special Correspondent/Occasional Host for NPR News, Montagne embarked on a new project: an NPR/collaboration called Lost Mothers.

Montagne, along with ProPublica reporting partner Nina Martin, spent the next year investigating why women are far more likely to die due to giving birth in the U.S. than all other developed nations.

Their investigation focused on why the maternal mortality rate in the U.S. is going up while it's going down in nearly every other nation; why African-American women are 3-to-4 times more likely to die than white women; and what's being done to reverse these dire statistics. The series set off a national conversation at a time when few Americans knew that, in the U.S., even a healthy woman with a perfect pregnancy and good health care risks dying, or nearly dying, in childbirth.

The stories, aired and published from 2017 through mid-2018, has been credited with inspiring laws in several states, as well as bills at the federal level aimed at protecting birthing mothers. In a 2018 Forbes op-ed arguing for a federal law to end America's “maternal death epidemic,” Senator Tammy Duckworth cited the NPR/ProPublica investigation Lost Mothers. Duckworth also linked directly to Montagne's NPR story on how California succeeded in cutting in half its maternal mortality rate. On 12/21/2018 HR 1318 “Preventing Maternal Deaths Act” was signed into law – a law that incorporated the Senate bill Duckworth had championed in the op-ed.

Renee Montagne announced her retirement on January 23, 2025.

== Awards and recognition ==
- 1995 Alfred I. duPont-Columbia University Award for coverage of South African elections
- Overseas Press Club recognition for coverage of the Afghanistan war
- National Association of Black Journalists recognition for a reporting series on Black musicians who fought in wars during the 20th Century
- Harvard Goldsmith Prize for Investigative Reporting - 2018
- George Polk Award - 2017
- Peabody Award - 2017
- New York Academy of Medicine Health Equity Journalism Prize - 2018
- National Academies of Science, Engineering, and Medicine Communication Award (category "Online") - 2018
- Sigma Delta Chi Award Society of Professional Journalists ("Online Reporting" in category "Public Service") - 2017
- National Association of Black Journalists Salute to Excellence Award (category "Digital Media") - 2018
- Pulitzer Prize Finalist (“Explanatory Reporting” category) - 2018
- Edward R. Murrow Award (category "Digital Media") - 2018
- American Society of Magazine Editors National Magazine Awards Finalist (“Public Interest” category) - 2018
- Columbia University Press "The 2018 Best American Magazine Writing" collection
- "The 100 Most Engaging Stories of 2017", Chartbeat
- Gracie Award/”Alliance for Women in Media” 2015 for "Outstanding Individual Achievement - Afghanistan Coverage" and “Outstanding Anchor/News Magazine” (NPR's Morning Edition)
- Global Women's Rights Award 2011 "Feminist Majority Foundation" Cited coverage of women in Afghanistan
- University of Denver Anvil of Freedom Award – 2008

Media offices
Preceded by Bob Edwards	Host of Morning Edition; 2004 – 2016 (co-host with Steve Inskeep)	Succeeded by Rachel Martin and Noel King
