= David Marchese =

Canadian journalist

- Born: Canada
- Occupation: journalist

David Marchese is a Canadian journalist who is known for his celebrity interviews in publications including Vulture, Spin, and The New York Times.

== Early life and education ==
Marchese grew up in Toronto. As a teenager, Marchese briefly played in a band called Scream and Die.

He attended the Cultural Reporting and Criticism program at New York University.

== Career ==
After graduating from New York University, Marchese became an intern at Salon.com. He went on to edit and write for Spin magazine and Rolling Stone.

Marchese became culture editor of New York magazine in 2014. Two years later, he became contributing editor for the publication's culture site Vulture, where he authored the In Conversation series, interviewing celebrities including Erykah Badu and Julian Casablancas. His 2018 interview with Quincy Jones, in which the subject criticized Michael Jackson and the Beatles and alluded to an alleged affair between Marlon Brando and Richard Pryor, went viral on social media.

In 2019, Marchese began writing The New York Times Magazine's Talk column, which featured long-form interviews with cultural figures and other notable people.

In 2024, Talk transitioned into a weekly podcast and interview franchise, The Interview, hosted by Marchese and Lulu Garcia-Navarro.

Media critics have praised Marchese for his ability to elicit unexpected, vulnerable, and profound answers from interview subjects. He has said he spends up to six weeks preparing for an interview by reading everything available about an interviewee, including material not accessible via the Internet. He comes to interviews with three to five pages of questions prepared in advance.

In October 2024, Marchese claimed in an article that he wrote for the New York Times that as early as seven years old, he watched a film featuring Al Pacino and was able to appreciate that it was "great acting."

In November 2024, Marchese interviewed a doctor and advocate for medical assistance in dying (MAID), who helped Marchese understand his mother's decision to die through MAID.

Marchese interviewed the influential anti-democracy blogger Curtis Yarvin for the Times in January 2025.

== Personal life ==
Marchese lives in suburban New Jersey. He is married and has two children. He is Jewish and an atheist.
