= Tell Me More =

American radio program

- Genre: Talk show, news program
- Country of origin: United States
- Language(s): English
- Syndicates: NPR
- Hosted by: Michel Martin
- Original release: April 30, 2007 – August 1, 2014
- Audio format: Stereophonic
- Website: Website

Tell Me More is a National Public Radio (NPR) interview show that was hosted by journalist Michel Martin. Tell Me More was first introduced online in December 2006 through an "open piloting" program called "Rough Cuts". Martin and the show's producers provided a regular podcast and blog on NPR's website, testing show ideas, offering sample segments, and soliciting user feedback. It began broadcasting on April 30, 2007.

NPR announced on May 20, 2014, that it would be canceling Tell Me More on August 1, 2014, and laying off 28 people as part of a larger effort to eliminate NPR's budget deficit. Host Michel Martin will stay with the network as will a small subset of her current team. She will report for NPR newsmagazines such as Morning Edition and All Things Considered on race and diversity issues as well as faith, family and identity issues. Upon announcement of the show's cancellation, Martin acknowledged having "scar tissue" as a result of the failure of NPR leadership to institutionalize support for the program and expressed her intention to hold the network to its mission and its promises: "We've done a lot to show what's possible here and I want to keep that going. I can't say you need to do better at serving these audiences and then walk away from it. I don't think that's fair."

== Features ==
Regular contributors included nationally syndicated columnist Ruben Navarrette; writer Jimi Izrael; human rights lawyer Arsalan Iftikhar; "Money Coach" Alvin Hall; professor Lester Spence; and Maryland State Legislator Jolene Ivy. Jimi Izrael moderated a weekly all-male segment called "The Barbershop", covering topics related to minority communities. Other segments included:

- "Faith Matters", a forum of spiritual leaders from some of the major faith traditions discussing issues of public concern
- "Moms", featuring parents sharing opinions on family issues, with contributors Jolene Ivey, Leslie Morgan Steiner, Asra Nomani and Dani Tucker
- "Political Chat", a roundtable of analysts, editorial writers and columnists
- "Wisdom Watch", featuring "elder statespeople," scholars and activists
