= Differ We Must =

Steve Inskeep book about President Abraham Lincoln

Differ We Must: How Lincoln Succeeded in a Divided America is a 2023 nonfiction book by Steve Inskeep, about Abraham Lincoln.

The title of the work originates from the phrase "If for this you and I must differ, differ we must," which Lincoln wrote inside correspondence to Joshua Fry "Josh" Speed, referring to his disagreement with Speed's viewpoints, as Speed's family owned slaves.

== Contents ==
There is a chapter about how Lincoln grew up, then content about how Lincoln interacted with other notable persons, with sixteen of them, including those with Frederick Douglass, George McClellan, William Seward, and Mary Ellen Wise documented in this book. The chapter at the end of the book details how Lincoln managed his domestic affairs, and Inskeep argued that this further bolstered his political skills, which he used while President of the United States. Mary Todd Lincoln is described in the last chapter.

Andrew DeMillo of the Associated Press wrote that the book "details how much Lincoln's political skill was a part of the late president's legacy and character."

== Reception ==
DeMillo stated that the chapters showing how Lincoln interacted with persons not as well known to the American public in 2023 were "the most compelling". He added that the book "offers more than enough to stand out among recent additions to" works in this topic.

Kirkus Reviews argued that the book is "An admirable addition to Lincolniana" and a "satisfying new look".

Publishers Weekly praised "the energetic narrative and the intriguing cast of characters" though the review stated that "backstory and minutae" sometimes get in the way of "Inskeep's novel thesis".

Alexis Coe of the Washington Post described the book as "welcome" even though there were many other books on the subject, and that the author "writes with a biographer's distance and restraint." According to Coe, the author demonstrably shows that "Lincoln advances as a person and a politician." Coe stated that the portions that discuss his interactions with women "unfortunately, read like afterthoughts" and that the portion about Lincoln's wife was "more frustrating" than the other content about women.
