= Amanda Figueras =

Spanish journalist (born 1978)

Amanda Figueras (born 1978) is a Spanish journalist and writer who worked for El Mundo for more than a decade. After becoming a Muslim, she has written about her faith, and is known for her 2018 book Why Islam: my life as a woman, European and Muslim.

== Early life and education ==
Amanda Figueras was born in Vilafranca del Penedès, Barcelona in 1978.

She holds a degree in journalism and studied for a year at a Portuguese university, in line with the Erasmus Programme. She has also undertaken informal studies of Islamic culture.

== Career ==
Figueras worked for around ten years as a journalist for Spanish daily El Mundo, where she established the European Affairs section.

She had not had a religion before, but started practising Islam after a personal journey which she said began in the aftermath of the 2004 Madrid train bombings, when she was working at El Mundo. She wrote a book called Why Islam: my life as a woman, European and Muslim, published in 2018.

In 2015, Figueras began working as a project manager at Foro Abraham for Interfaith and Intercultural Dialogue. She writes articles for several publications, including The Islamic Monthly.

== Recognition and other activities ==
Figueras is a Fellow of both the United Nations Alliance of Civilizations and the international KAICIID Dialogue Centre.

== Personal life ==
As of 2020 Figueras was living between Madrid and Cairo. She is married to an Egyptian man and they have a son.
