= Billy Martin (lawyer) =

American lawyer

William R. Martin is a partner at the D.C. office of Barnes & Thornburg, LLP. His notable past clients have included NBA stars Allen Iverson and Jayson Williams, Monica Lewinsky's mother, and Chandra Levy's parents. He also represented former Atlanta mayor Bill Campbell on racketeering, bribery and wire fraud charges; Campbell was convicted of three counts of tax fraud, but acquitted on racketeering and bribery charges. Martin also defended former NBA player Jayson Williams at trial during Spring 2004.

Martin represented Senator Larry Craig in his effort to have his disorderly conduct conviction overturned and expunged. On December 9, 2008, the Minnesota Court of Appeals affirmed a District Court's ruling denying Craig's request to withdraw his guilty plea. Martin has said he may appeal to the Minnesota Supreme Court.

Martin is a graduate of Howard University and the University of Cincinnati College of Law. He is married to National Public Radio journalist and radio host Michel Martin.
