= Liane Hansen =

American broadcast journalist

- Born: September 29, 1951 (age 75); Worcester, Massachusetts, U.S.
- Education: University of Hartford
- Occupation: Journalist
- Notable credit(s): Performance Today; Weekend All Things Considered; Weekend Edition Sunday
- Spouse: Neal Conan (1982–2011)

Liane Hansen (/liːˈæn/; born September 29, 1951) is an American journalist and radio personality. She was the host of the National Public Radio (NPR) newsmagazine Weekend Edition Sunday from 1989 until her retirement in May 2011. Her experience in broadcast journalism includes working as a reporter, producer, and host for local and national programs.

== Biography ==
Hansen was born in Worcester, Massachusetts. Her first participation in public broadcasting was in 1976, when she became a production assistant and substitute host for then-local public radio show Fresh Air in Philadelphia. In 1979, she joined NPR as a production assistant for All Things Considered. She later hosted Weekend All Things Considered, Performance Today and guest-hosted Fresh Air after that program was in national syndication through NPR. In November 1989, Hansen joined Weekend Edition Sunday.

Hansen is the daughter of Edwin Hansen and Lois Hansen. The spelling of Hansen's first name came from that of Liane de Pougy (1869–1950). She was married to fellow NPR host Neal Conan with whom she has two sons, Connor and Casey. In April 2011, Hansen stated publicly that she and Conan were divorcing, in a parting she described as "amicable".

On May 30, 2010, Hansen announced that she would retire from Weekend Edition Sunday at the end of May 2011, a time that coincided with the end of her contract with NPR and with the lease on her apartment in Washington, DC. She intended to spend her retirement on Delaware's ocean shore. Her last broadcast was May 29, 2011. After retiring, Hansen moved to Bethany Beach, Delaware, and helped launch Delaware's only public radio station, WDDE, and serves on its governing board.

== Sources ==
- "Liane Hansen, NPR Biography". National Public Radio. 2008.
- "Liane Hansen and Neal Conan Go Where They've Never Gone Before". National Public Radio. November 18, 2005.
