= David S. Broder =

American journalist (1929–2011)

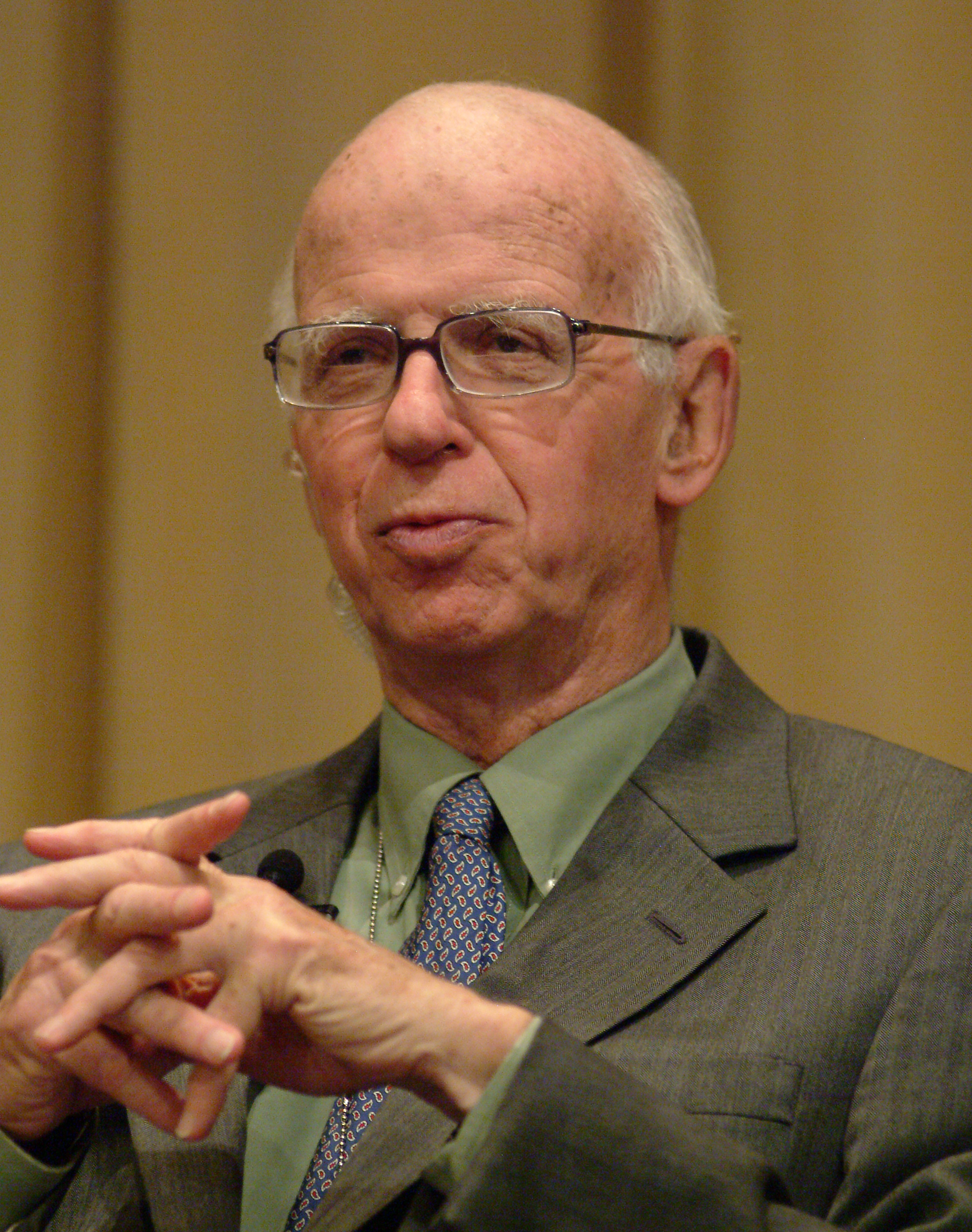
- Broder in 2008
- Born: David Salzer Broder; September 11, 1929; Chicago Heights, Illinois, U.S.
- Died: March 9, 2011 (aged 81); Arlington County, Virginia, U.S.
- Education: B.A. Liberal Arts University of Chicago; M.A. Political Science University of Chicago
- Occupations: Journalist, columnist, lecturer, writer
- Years active: 1953–2011
- Spouse: Ann Creighton Collar
- Children: 4

David Salzer Broder (September 11, 1929 – March 9, 2011) was an American journalist, writing for The Washington Post for over 40 years. He was also an author, television news show pundit, and university lecturer.

For more than half a century, Broder reported on every presidential campaign, beginning with the 1956 United States presidential election between Dwight D. Eisenhower and Adlai Stevenson II. Known as the dean of the Washington, D.C. press corps, Broder made over 400 appearances on NBC's Meet the Press. The Forbes Media Guide Five Hundred, 1994 stated: "Broder is the best of an almost extinct species, the daily news reporter who doubles as an op-ed page columnist....With his solid reporting and shrewd analysis, Broder remains one of the sager voices in Washington."

== Early life and education ==
David Salzer Broder was born to a Jewish family in Chicago Heights, Illinois, the son of Albert "Doc" Broder, a dentist, and Nina Salzer Broder.

He earned a bachelor's degree in liberal arts from the University of Chicago in 1947 and continued his studies there, receiving a master's degree in political science in 1951. While at Chicago, he met fellow student Ann Creighton Collar, and they were married in Crawfordsville, Indiana, in 1951. They had four sons—George, Joshua, Matthew, and Michael—and seven grandchildren.

== Early journalism ==
Broder began working as a journalist while pursuing his master's degree, serving as editor of The Chicago Maroon and later at the Hyde Park Herald. He was drafted into the U.S. Army in 1951, where he wrote for the newspaper U.S. Forces Austria (USFA) Sentinel, until he was discharged from the Army in 1953.

In 1953 Broder reported for The Pantagraph in Bloomington, Illinois, covering Livingston and Woodford counties in the central part of the state. From there he moved to the Congressional Quarterly in Washington D.C., in 1955, where he apprenticed under senior reporter Helen Monberg and got his first taste of covering congressional politics. During his four-and-a-half years at CQ, Broder also worked for The New York Times as a freelance writer.

In 1960 Broder joined The Washington Star as a junior political writer covering the presidential election that year between John F. Kennedy and Richard Nixon. During his five years at the Star, he was promoted to a national political news reporter and was a weekly contributor to the paper's op-ed page.

Broder left the Star for The New York Times in 1965, hired by well-known Times political reporter and columnist Tom Wicker to serve in its Washington bureau.

== The Washington Post columnist ==
After 18 months at The New York Times, Broder moved to The Washington Post, where he would remain for over 40 years, beginning as a reporter and weekly op-ed contributor. Later, he was given a second weekly column. Broder's columns were distributed initially through The Washington Post Wire Service and then later syndicated through The Washington Post Writers Group. More than 300 newspapers carried his columns for many years.

The longtime columnist was informally known as the dean of the Washington press corps and the "unofficial chairman of the board" by national political writers.

In May 2008, Broder accepted a buyout offer from The Washington Post Co., effective January 1, 2009, but continued to write his twice-weekly Post column as a contract employee. In a letter to the publications that ran his column, Broder said: "This change will allow me to focus entirely on the column while freeing up the Post to use its budget for other news-section salaries and expenses."

In June 2008, Ken Silverstein, a columnist at Harper's Magazine, alleged that Broder had accepted free accommodations and thousands of dollars in speaking fees from various business and healthcare groups, in one instance penning an opinion column supporting positions favored by one of the groups. Deborah Howell, The Washington Post's ombudsman at the time, wrote that Broder's acceptance of speaking fees appeared to be a violation of the paper's policy on outside speeches, as was that some of the groups that paid Broder also lobby Congress. Howell pointed out that Broder said "he had cleared his speeches with Milton Coleman, deputy managing editor, or Tom Wilkinson, an assistant managing editor, but neither remembered him mentioning them."

== Pulitzer Prize ==
Broder won the Pulitzer Prize for Commentary in 1973 and was the recipient of numerous awards and academic honors before and after. In his Pulitzer Prize acceptance speech, Broder said:

Instead of promising "All the News That's Fit to Print," I would like to see us say—over and over until the point has been made—that the newspaper that drops on your doorstep is a partial, hasty, incomplete, inevitably somewhat flawed and inaccurate rendering of some of the things we have heard about in the past 24 hours—distorted, despite our best efforts to eliminate gross bias, by the very process of compression that makes it possible for you to lift it from the doorstep and read it in about an hour. If we labeled the product accurately, then we could immediately add: But it's the best we could do under the circumstances, and we will be back tomorrow with a corrected and updated version.

== Meet the Press and other broadcast media ==
For many years Broder appeared on Washington Week, Meet the Press, and other network television and radio news programs. It was announced at the close of August 10, 2008, broadcast of Meet the Press that Broder was celebrating his 400th appearance on that program, on which he first appeared July 7, 1963. He appeared far more often than any other person, other than the program's hosts. The next closest person to Broder was Bob Novak, who had appeared on Meet the Press fewer than 250 times.

Broder was a weekly guest on XM/Sirius Satellite Radio's The Bob Edwards Show starting in October 2004. On the premiere broadcast, Broder was joined by CBS News anchor Walter Cronkite as the program's first guest. Broder also contributed to The Bob Edwards Show as a political commentator.

== Lecturer and author ==
In 2001 Broder became a lecturer at the University of Maryland's Philip Merrill College of Journalism while continuing to write full-time at The Washington Post. He generally lectured one class a year on politics and the press, the class meeting at the newspaper. Merrill College Dean Thomas Kunkel described Broder as the nation's "most respected political journalist" when he announced Broder's hire. Broder also lectured at Duke University (1987–88).

External videos
- Booknotes interview with Broder on The System: The American Way of Politics at the Breaking Point May 5, 1996, C-SPAN
- Presentation by Broder and Haynes Johnson on The System: The American Way of Politics at the Breaking Point at the Freedom Forum, July 7, 1996, C-SPAN
- Presentation by Broder on Democracy Derailed at the National Press Club, April 25, 2000, C-SPAN

He is author or co-author of eight books:

- Democracy Derailed: Initiative Campaigns and the Power of Money (Harcourt, 2000) ISBN 978-0-15-100464-5
- The System: The American Way of Politics at the Breaking Point with Haynes Johnson (Little, Brown and Company, 1996) ISBN 978-0-316-46969-2
- The Man Who Would be President: Dan Quayle with Bob Woodward (Simon & Schuster, 1992) ISBN 978-0-671-79183-4
- Behind the Front Page: A Candid Look at How the News Is Made (Simon & Schuster 1987) ISBN 978-0-671-44943-8
- Changing of the Guard: Power and Leadership in America (Simon & Schuster, 1980) ISBN 978-0-671-24566-5
- The Party's Over: The Failure of Politics in America (Harper and Row, 1972) ISBN 978-0-06-010483-2
- The Republican Establishment: The Present and Future of the G.O.P. with Stephen H. Hess (Harper and Row, 1967) ISBN 978-0-06-011877-8
- The Pursuit of the Presidency 1980 with the staff of The Washington Post (Berkeley Books, 1980) ISBN 978-0-425-04703-3
- Authored the foreword for The Ticket-Splitter: A New Force in American Politics 1972 Co-Authors: Walter DeVries and V. Lance Tarrance

== Death ==
Broder died of complications from diabetes on March 9, 2011, at the age of 81. Upon Broder's death, President Barack Obama called him the "most respected and incisive political commentator of his generation".

== Criticism ==
The New Yorker's political commentator Hendrik Hertzberg called Broder "relentlessly centrist." Frank Rich of The New York Times described Broder as the nation's "bloviator in chief."

While on vacation, Broder would write his column from his retreat on Beaver Island, Michigan. Writing for Slate, Timothy Noah found Broder's attempts to merge national affairs with summertime reflections "mind-bendingly dull." Writing in the Washington City Paper, Jack Shafer felt that Broder managed to merge "the cosmic and common in a stupefying slop of prose."

The left-wing blogger Atrios, a frequent critic of Broder's work, coined the term High Broderism:

We normally think of "High Broderism" as the worship of bipartisanship for its own sake, combined with a fake "pox on both their houses" attitude. But in reality, this is just the cover Broder uses for his real agenda, the defense of what he perceives to be "the establishment" at all costs.

== Depictions in popular culture ==
He earned substantial attention in two books chronicling the media's coverage of the 1972 presidential campaign between Richard Nixon and George McGovern, including Timothy Crouse's The Boys on the Bus and Gonzo journalist Hunter S. Thompson's Fear and Loathing: On the Campaign Trail '72.

Broder's work was also cited in two autobiographies by key figures in the history of The Washington Post: Personal History by Post publisher Katharine Graham in 1997 and A Good Life: Newspapering and Other Adventures by Post executive editor Ben Bradlee in 1995. More recently, Broder was included in former Post columnist Dave Kindred's 2010 book on the paper's struggles in the changing media landscape: Morning Miracle: A Great Newspaper Fights for Its Life. Broder is also mentioned in President Bill Clinton's biography First in His Class by David Maraniss.

Broder earned a place in works of fiction, meriting a mention by a White House senior staffer to fictional U.S. president Jed Bartlet (portrayed by actor Martin Sheen) on the NBC-TV series The West Wing, and in Steven Spielberg's 2017 film The Post. In the 2018 film The Front Runner, he is portrayed by John Bedford Lloyd.

== Awards and recognitions ==
- Pulitzer Prize for Commentary, 1973
- 4th Estate Award from the National Press Club, 1988
- White Burkett Miller Presidential Award in 1989
- Elijah Parish Lovejoy Award (Colby College), 1990
- National Press Foundation's Distinguished Contributions to Journalism Award, 1992
- Illinois State Society Distinguished Illinoisans Award, 1997
- National Society of Newspaper Columnists Lifetime Achievement Award, 1997
- William Allen White Foundation's Award for Distinguished Achievement in Journalism, 1997
- Honorary Doctor of Political Science, DePauw University, May 18, 2003
- Washingtonian Magazine's 50 Best Journalists, 2005
- University of Chicago Alumni Medal, June 2005
- Jefferson-Lincoln Award, Panetta Institute for Public Policy, 2007
- Washingtonian Magazine's 50 Best Journalists 2009
- David S. Broder was inducted as a Laureate of The Lincoln Academy of Illinois and awarded the Order of Lincoln (the State's highest honor) by the Governor of Illinois in 2005 in the area of Communications.

=== Honorary degrees ===
- Honorary Doctor of Laws, Cleveland State University, 1981
- Doctor of Literature, Wittenberg University, 1982
- Doctor of Humane Letters, Yale University, 1984
- Doctor of Humane Letters, Kalamazoo College, 1988
- Honorary Degree, Rider University, 1989
- Honorary Doctor of Laws, Lawrence University, 1989
- Honorary Degree, University of Michigan, 1994
- Doctor of Humane Letters, College of William & Mary, 1995
- Doctor of Journalism, University of Miami, 1999
- Doctor of Humane Letters, Muhlenberg College, 2000
- Honorary Doctor of Political Science, DePauw University, May 18, 2003
- Honorary Degree, Clark University, 2005
- Doctor of Humane Letters, Bryant University, 2006
- Honorary Doctor of Laws, Ball State University, 2006
- Doctor of Humanities, Santa Clara University, 2007
- Honorary Doctor of Humane Letters, Bradley University, May 17, 2008.
