= Morton Margolin Prize for Distinguished Business Reporting =

The Morton Margolin Prize for Distinguished Business Reporting was an award for reporting in business journalism published in a Colorado newspaper or magazine. It was awarded between 1980–2008 by the University of Denver Daniels College of Business and the University's Department of Media, Film and Journalism Studies (formerly part of the School of Communication).

The Margolin Family Distinguished Lecture Award was established at the University of Denver in 2015 to honor the legacy of Morton Margolin and to replace the Prize. The annual lecture introduces university students and the broader Denver community to journalists and news influencers who are utilizing journalism and media to inform and to bring about positive change on issues of concern to young people.

== Recipients: The Margolin Family Distinguished Lecture Award ==
- 2024-2025: Gustavo Arellano, Los Angeles Times
- 2024-2025: Sara Castellanos, The Wall Street Journal
- 2023-2024: Santiago Mayer, founder, Voters of Tomorrow
- 2022-2023: Sophia Kianni, Founder, Climate Cardinals
- 2021-2022: Andrea Alejandra Gonzales, New Yorkers Against Gun Violence
- 2020-2021: Karin Fischer, The Chronicle of Higher Education
- 2019-2020: Evan Smith, The Texas Tribune
- 2018-2019: William M. Arkin, The Guardian
- 2017-2018: Dean Baker, Center for Economic and Policy Research
- 2016-2017: Julianne Malveaux, President, Bennett College
- 2015-2016: Lulu Garcia-Navarro, National Public Radio
- 2014-2015: Riva Froymovich, The Wall Street Journal
- Morton Margolin Prize for Distinguished Business Reporting
- 2008: Gargi Chakrabarty, Rocky Mountain News
- 2007: David Olinger and Aldo Svaldi, The Denver Post and Gargi Chakrabarty, Rocky Mountain News
- 2006: Allen Best, ColoradoBiz
- 2005: Paul Beebe and Bryan Oller, The Gazette
- 2004: Greg Griffin and Jeffrey Leib, The Denver Post
- 2003: Louis Aguilar and Kevin Simpson, The Denver Post
- 2002: Shannon Joyce Neal, The Daily Sentinel
- 2001: Greg Griffin, The Denver Post
- 2000: Tina Griego, Rocky Mountain News
- 1999: Al Lewis, Rocky Mountain News
- 1998: Michele S. Conklin, Rocky Mountain News
- 1997: Alan Prendergast, Westword
- 1996: John Accola, Rocky Mountain News
- 1995: Price Coleman, Rocky Mountain News
- 1994: Julie Hutchinson, Colorado Business
- 1993: Garrison Wells, Denver Business Journal
- 1992: Andy van De Voorde, Westword
- 1991: Jaye Scholl, Barron's
- 1990: Don Knox, Rocky Mountain News
- 1989: Mark Harden, The Herald (Everett, Washington)
- 1988: Henry Dubroff and Mark Tatge, The Denver Post
- 1987: Suzanne Costas, Denver Business Journal
- 1986: Michael Rounds, Rocky Mountain News
- 1985: Glenn Meyers and Jeff Rundles, Rocky Mountain Business Journal
- 1984: Gail Pits, The Denver Post
- 1983: Joe Weber, Rocky Mountain News
- 1982: William Boas, Jr, Colorado Business
- 1981: Jerry Ruhl, Rocky Mountain News
- 1980: Alan Gersten, Rocky Mountain News
