= Michel Martin =

American journalist

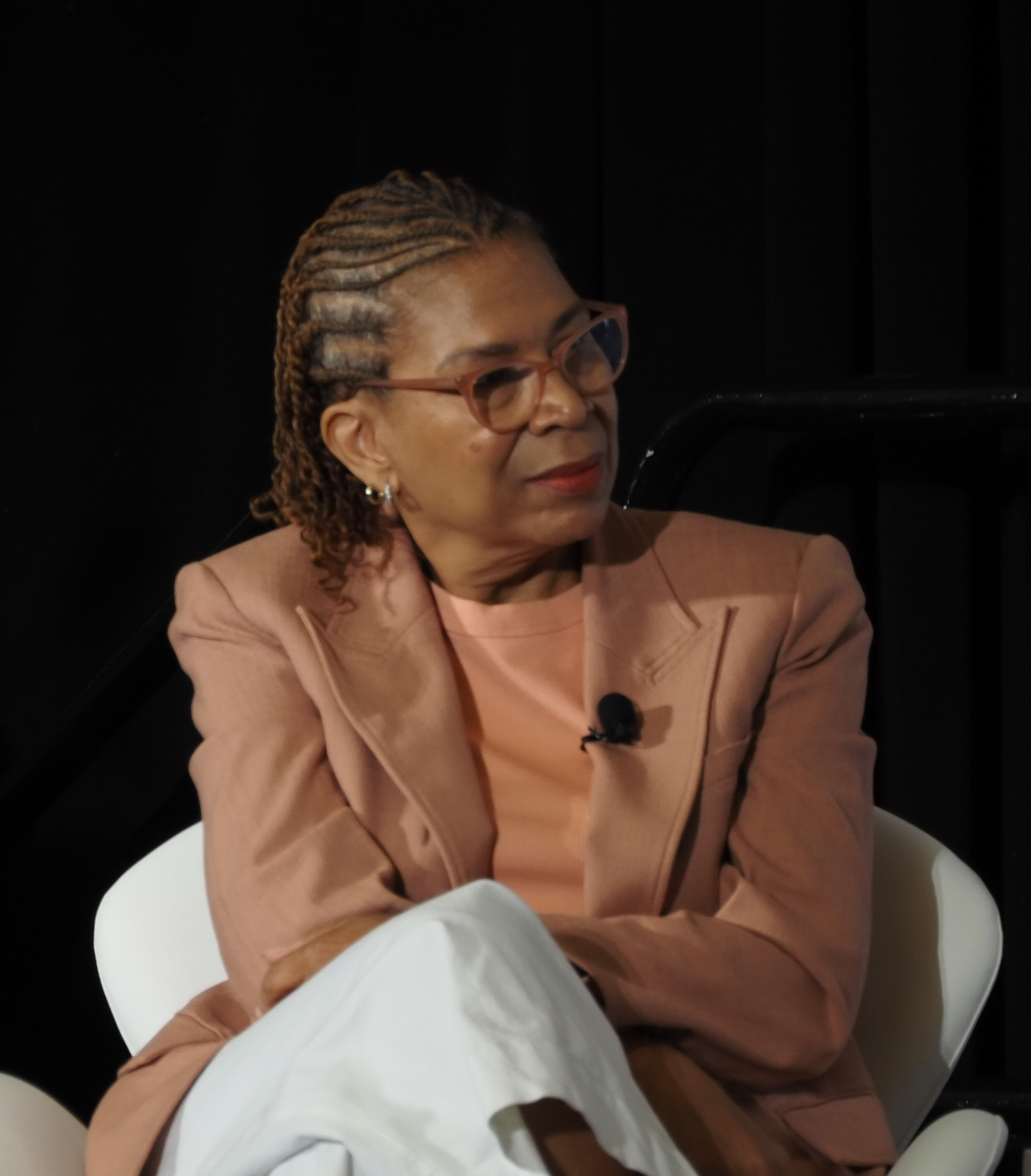
- Martin at the 2026 National Book Festival
- Born: New York City, New York, U.S.
- Education: Radcliffe College, Harvard University (BA); Wesley Theological Seminary (MA)
- Spouse: Billy Martin
- Children: 2
- Awards: Emmy Award

Michel McQueen Martin (née McQueen) is an American journalist and correspondent for National Public Radio and WNET. After ten years in print journalism, Martin has become best known for her radio and television news broadcasting on national topics.

== Background ==
A Brooklyn, New York native, Martin attended the borough's George Gershwin Junior High, then enrolled at St. Paul's School in Concord, New Hampshire, part of the fifth class of women to graduate from the formerly all-male school. In 1980, Martin graduated cum laude from Radcliffe College of Harvard University. In 2016, she earned a Master of Arts from Wesley Theological Seminary in Washington D.C.

== News career ==
After working the local news beat for The Washington Post and becoming White House correspondent for The Wall Street Journal, Martin joined ABC News in 1992.

At ABC, Martin reported for Nightline, and was awarded an Emmy for a report that aired on Day One. In 2001, she hosted the PBS show Life 360. Beginning in April 2007, she hosted Tell Me More for National Public Radio (NPR) for seven years, focusing on topics of race, religion, and spirituality. Upon the announcement by NPR of the cancellation of Tell Me More, to be effective August 1, 2014, Martin criticized NPR leadership for failure to institutionalize support for the program and questioned NPR's commitment to serving African-American listeners and other people of color, admitting that she had "scar tissue" as a result of the cancellation. She and the show's producer, Carline Watson, remained with the network as "part of an initiative to incorporate the kind of coverage of issues of race, identity, faith, gender and family that appear on the show." From 2015 until 2023, Martin served as the host of Weekend All Things Considered and the Consider This Podcast. She is also known for her panel appearances on Real Time with Bill Maher.

In 2010, Martin and MSNBC anchor David Shuster taped a pilot episode for a proposed news and opinion show for CNN.

Since 2018, Martin has been a correspondent for WNET's Amanpour & Company.

NPR announced in early March 2023 that Martin would be joining the Morning Edition team as its fourth anchor (following Rachel Martin's departure from daily hosting duties); her first day on Morning Edition was March 27.

== Personal life ==
Martin is married to attorney Billy Martin. They share twins, as well as two grown daughters from her husband's previous marriage.

== Awards ==
- Candace Award, National Coalition of 100 Black Women, 1992.
- Emmy Award, ABC newsmagazine Day One, for her coverage of the international campaign to ban landmines
- Joan Barone Award for Excellence in Washington-based National Affairs/Public Policy Broadcasting from the Radio and Television Correspondents' Association
- 2002 Silver Gavel Award, given by the American Bar Association
- Emmy nomination with Robert Krulwich for an ABC News program examining children's racial attitudes
- American Academy of Arts and Sciences Fellow of 2019.
