= The Islamic Monthly =

American online magazine

- Senior Editor: Amina Chaudary
- Categories: Newsmagazine
- Founded: 2011
- Final issue: 2012 (print)
- Country: United States
- Based in: Cambridge, Massachusetts
- Language: English
- Website: The Islamic Monthly
- ISSN: 2159-9246

The Islamic Monthly (TIM) is an online magazine published in the United States. The magazine was first published in 2011. Established by Amina Chaudary, it is self-defined as an independent, nonreligious publication that fosters discussion on a broad range of issues and concerns related to Muslims in the modern world. It was published in print during 2011 and became an online publication from 2012. Among its contributors are Amanda Figueras, a journalist for El Mundo.
