= Gretel Ehrlich =

American poet

- Born: January 21, 1946 (age 80); Santa Barbara, California, U.S.
- Occupation: Writer
- Partner: Neal Conan (2014 to his death)
- Writing career
- Period: 1978–present
- Genre: Nonfiction
- Notable work: This Cold Heaven
- Notable awards: Whiting Award; Henry David Thoreau Prize
- Website: www.gretelehrlich.com

Gretel Ehrlich is an American travel writer, poet and essayist.

== Biography ==
Born in 1946 in Santa Barbara, California, Ehrlich studied at Bennington College and UCLA film school. She began to write full-time in 1978 while living on a Wyoming ranch after the death of a loved one. Ehrlich debuted in 1985 with The Solace of Open Spaces, a collection of essays on rural life in Wyoming. Her first novel was also set in Wyoming, entitled Heart Mountain (1988), about a community being invaded by an internment camp for Japanese Americans.

One of Ehrlich's best-received books is a volume of creative nonfiction essays called Islands, The Universe, Home. Her characteristic style of merging intense, vivid, factual observations of nature with a wryly mystical personal voice is evident in this work. Other books include This Cold Heaven: Seven Seasons in Greenland and two volumes of poetry.

In 1991 Ehrlich was hit by lightning and was incapacitated for several years. She wrote a book about the experience, A Match to the Heart, which was published in 1994.

Since 1993, she has traveled extensively, especially through Greenland, Japan and western China.

Her work is frequently anthologised, including in The Nature Reader. She has also received many grants. In 1991, she collaborated with British choreographer Siobhan Davies, writing and recording a poem cycle for a ballet that opened in the Southbank Centre in London.

== Selected bibliography ==
- To Touch the Water, Ahsahta Press, 1981, ISBN 978-0-916272-16-6
- The Solace of Open Spaces, Viking Press, 1985, ISBN 978-0-670-80678-2; Ehrlich, Gretel (21 February 2017). 2017 edition. Open Road Media. ISBN 978-1-5040-4288-8.
- Heart Mountain, Viking Press, 1988, ISBN 978-0-670-82160-0; Ehrlich, Gretel (21 February 2017). 2017 edition. Open Road Media. ISBN 978-1-5040-4286-4.
- Drinking Dry Clouds: Stories from Wyoming, Capra Press, 1991, ISBN 978-0-88496-315-8; 2005 edition. U of Nebraska Press. January 2005. ISBN 0-8032-6754-1.
- Islands, the Universe, Home, Viking Press, 1991, ISBN 978-0-670-82161-7
- Arctic Heart: A Poem Cycle, Capra Press, 1992, ISBN 978-0-88496-357-8
- A Match to the Heart: One Woman's Story of Being Struck by Lightning, Pantheon Books, 1994, ISBN 978-0-679-42550-2; Ehrlich, Gretel (June 1995). 1995 ebook edition. Penguin. ISBN 978-1-4406-2108-6.
- John Muir: Nature's Visionary, National Geographic Society, 2000, ISBN 978-0-7922-7954-9 book jacket, courtesy of sierraclub.org
- This Cold Heaven: Seven Seasons in Greenland, Pantheon Books, 2001, ISBN 978-0-679-44200-4
- The Future of Ice: A Journey Into Cold, Pantheon Books, 2004, ISBN 978-0-375-42251-5
- In the Empire of Ice: Encounters in a Changing Landscape, National Geographic Society, 2010, ISBN 978-1-4262-0574-3
- Facing the Wave: A Journey in the Wake of the Tsunami, Pantheon, 2013, ISBN 978-0-307-90731-8; Ehrlich, Gretel (11 March 2014). 2014 pbk edition. Knopf Doubleday Publishing. ISBN 978-0-307-94927-1.
- Unsolaced: Among the Way to All That Is, Pantheon, 2021 ISBN 978-0-307-91179-7
