= Ralph Newman =

American writer and scholar of Abraham Lincoln (1911–1998)

Ralph Geoffrey Newman (3 November 1911 – 23 July 1998) was an American writer and well known Abraham Lincoln scholar. He owned the Abraham Lincoln Book Shop, Inc. in Chicago, Illinois, and hosted a monthly gathering known as the Civil War Round Table. He was an expert in Civil War-related manuscripts.

He played minor league second base for Tucson and Wichita.

Newman also was an appraiser who evaluated the papers of six United States presidents: Hoover, Truman, Eisenhower, Kennedy, Johnson, and Nixon.

Newman was indicted by a federal grand jury in July 1975 on charges of preparing a false affidavit that helped Richard Nixon obtain an illegal tax break on papers he donated and was convicted in November 1975.

== Family ==
Ralph Newman married Estelle Hoffman and they had two daughters, Maxine Newman Brandenburg and Carol Newman Parry. He later remarried, to actress Patricia Lyons. His stepson is NPR host Scott Simon.
