= Leila Fadel =

Lebanese-American journalist (born 1981)

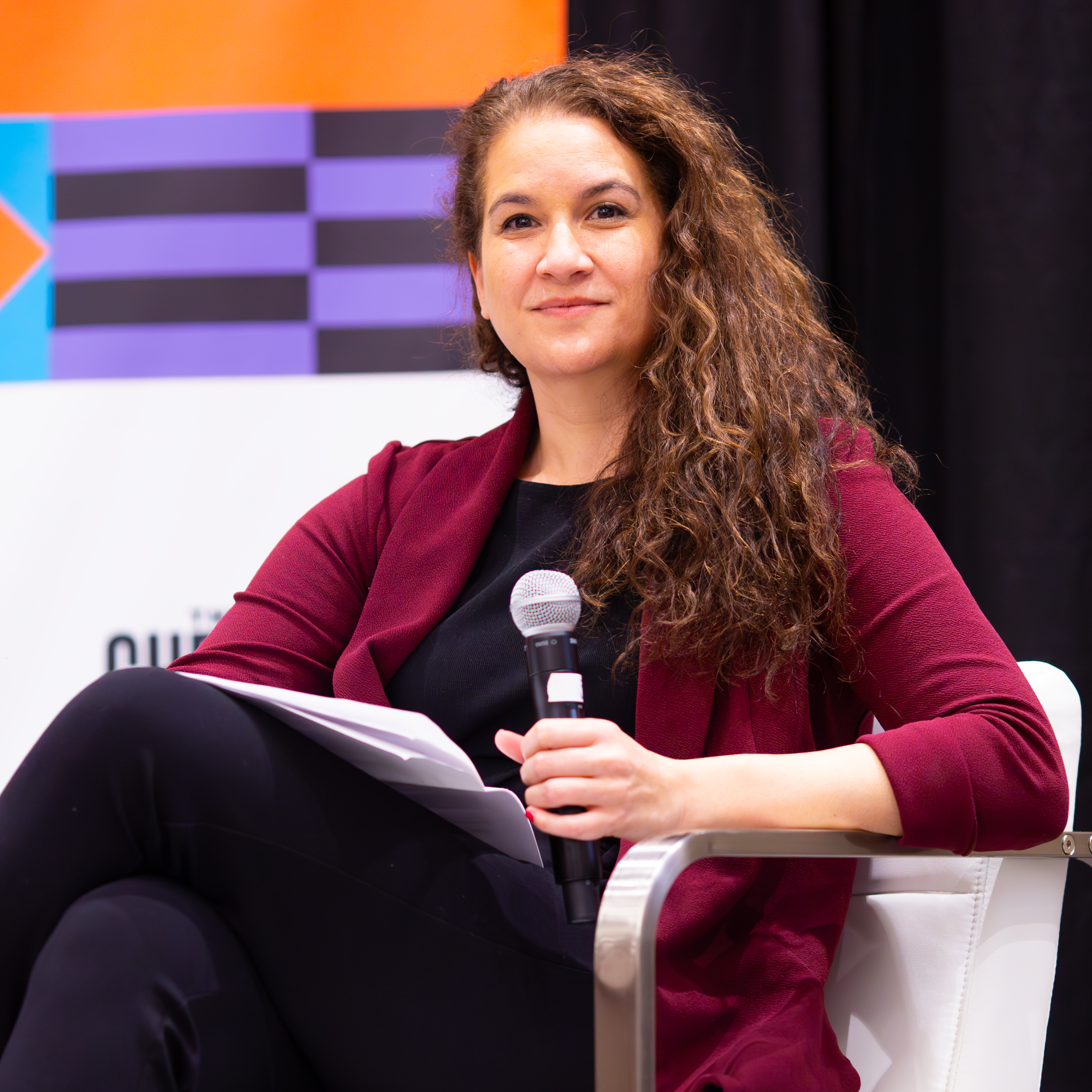
- Fadel at SXSW 2024
- Born: 1981 (age 44–45); Lebanon
- Citizenship: United States
- Education: Northeastern University
- Occupation: journalist
- Years active: 2004–present
- Employer: National Public Radio
- Awards: George Polk Award

Leila Fadel (Arabic: ليلى فاضل; born 1981) is a Lebanese-American journalist and the cohost of National Public Radio's Morning Edition, a role she assumed in 2022. She was previously the network's Cairo bureau chief. Fadel has worked extensively in the Middle East, and received a George Polk Award for her coverage of the Iraq War. She is also known for her coverage of the Arab Spring.

== Background ==
Fadel grew up in Lebanon and Saudi Arabia. She was a Jack Shaheen Mass Communications scholar and graduated from Northeastern University School of Journalism in 2004.

== Career ==
In 2004, Fadel began her career in journalism at the Fort Worth Star-Telegram as a crime and higher education reporter. She began covering the Iraq War in 2005 for Knight Ridder. By early 2006, she had completed two postings in Baghdad, Iraq. Then, she returned to Baghdad for McClatchy. She also covered the 2006 Lebanon War. She continued in Baghdad for McClatchy through 2009, where she contributed to McClatchy's Baghdad Observer.

In 2010, she joined The Washington Post's Middle East team. On February 2, 2011, Fadel and photographer Linda Davidson were among some two dozen journalists arrested by the Egyptian Interior Ministry. The next day, Fadel and Davidson were released, but placed under house arrest at a hotel. Two local Post employees remained in custody, interpreter Sufian Taha and driver Mansour el-Sayed Mohammed Abo Gouda; according to Fadel, Abo Gouda was beaten.

She covered the Arab Spring and its aftermaths in Libya, Tunisia, Egypt, and Syria for The Washington Post. In July 2012, Fadel was hired by NPR as Cairo bureau chief and covered the aftermath of the Arab Spring. She was a national correspondent at NPR reporting on race and diversity until she became host of Morning Edition, as well as NPR's morning news podcast Up First..

== Personal life ==
Fadel speaks conversational Arabic.

In 2006, she stated:

My goal is to find the missing voices, the ones I heard on the streets of Beirut and Saudi Arabia but which were often missing in American media... Great journalism is the ability to capture moments in time, weave them together, and tell the story of all people without condescension, without judgment and without an agenda.

== Awards ==
- 2007 - George Polk Award
- 2006 - Katie Award from the Dallas Press Club
- 2005 - Print Journalist of the Year honors from the Houston Press Club

== Recognition ==
- In 2008, Bill Moyers interviewed Fadel on Bill Moyers' Journal.
- In 2011, Charlie Rose interviewed her on The Charlie Rose Show with mentor Anthony Shadid.

== See also ==
- Anthony Shadid
- Jack Shaheen
