= Weekend Edition =

American radio news magazine programs

- Genre: News, analysis, commentary, interviews, special features
- Running time: c. 105 min
- Country of origin: United States
- Language(s): English
- Syndicates: National Public Radio (NPR)
- Hosted by: Scott Simon (Saturdays); Ayesha Rascoe (Sundays)
- Recording studio: Washington, D.C.
- Original release: Saturday: November 2, 1985; Sunday: January 18, 1987 – present
- Audio format: Stereophonic
- Opening theme: B.J. Leiderman (composer)
- Website: Weekend Edition Saturday; Weekend Edition Sunday

Weekend Edition is a set of American radio news magazine programs produced and distributed by National Public Radio (NPR). It is the weekend counterpart to the NPR radio program Morning Edition. It consists of Weekend Edition Saturday and Weekend Edition Sunday, each of which airs for two hours, from 8:00 a.m. to 10:00 a.m. Eastern time, with refeeds until 2:00 p.m. Weekend Edition Saturday is hosted by Scott Simon. Weekend Edition Sunday is hosted by Ayesha Rascoe.

The programs feature longer stories than most NPR news magazines, and more arts and culture stories.

== Format ==
Weekday sibling Morning Edition breaks up each hour into five segments, none more than twelve minutes long; Weekend Edition uses only three segments per hour, accommodating longer stories than Morning Edition typically accommodates.

Weekend Edition begins with a sixty-second billboard. Both Simon and Rascoe use the billboard as a general discussion about what's coming up in the hour, infused with soundbites from selected stories. A standard five-minute NPR newscast follows, until six past the hour. A thirty-second music bed follows the newscast, allowing local stations an opportunity to promote programming or local news/weather/traffic.

Segment A begins at 6:30 past the hour (duration 11:29). The most important news of the day is placed here. Regular features (such as, before his death, Daniel Schorr's weekly news wrap-up) appear in this segment. At eighteen minutes past the hour, a two-minute station break starts. The first minute is a music bed solely for use of the member stations. The second minute, from nineteen to twenty past, is a "headlines" segment in which the NPR newscaster on staff that morning recaps the major stories of the hour. Some stations decide to use the entire two minutes for local purposes, taking the opportunity to deliver their own headlines, underwriting or events calendars.

At twenty past the hour, segment B begins, running 14:19 in length. NPR offers local stations a cutaway from the national feed at 34:20 past the hour. The cutaway is identified by the host when he or she says, "You're listening to Weekend Edition from NPR News". For stations that opt to stay with the national feed, a short interview or commentary piece is delivered, running 2:59 in length. Another two-minute station break, following the same music bed/headlines format as the first, ensues.

Segment C, the longest segment of the hour, starts at 40:00 after the hour and runs for seventeen minutes, forty-nine seconds. Weekend Edition Saturday usually slots musical performances, arts stories or interviews in segment C. Weekend Edition Sunday uses the time for its popular weekly puzzle segment with Will Shortz, the New York Times crossword puzzle editor, and interviews and light features. At the end of the segment, the host credits theme song composer B.J. Leiderman and signs off for the hour. Segment C is followed by a forty-second funding credit announcement, and then ninety seconds of music.

== Hosts ==
- Weekend Edition Saturday
  - Scott Simon (1985–1992; 1993–present)
  - Alex Chadwick (1992–1993)
- Weekend Edition Sunday
  - Susan Stamberg (1987–1989)
  - Liane Hansen (1989–2011)
  - Audie Cornish (2011–2012)
  - Rachel Martin (2012–2016)
  - Lulu Garcia-Navarro (2017–2021)
  - Ayesha Rascoe and other NPR correspondents alternated hosting Weekend Edition Sunday, after host Lulu Garcia-Navarro departed in October 2021.
  - Ayesha Rascoe (2022–). Rascoe's first broadcast as the permanent host was March 27, 2022.
- Contributors:
  - Joe Bevilacqua (won 2004 Silver Reel Award from the National Federation of Community Broadcasters for his personal essay, "A Guy Named Joe Bevilacqua")
