= Rachel Martin =

American journalist

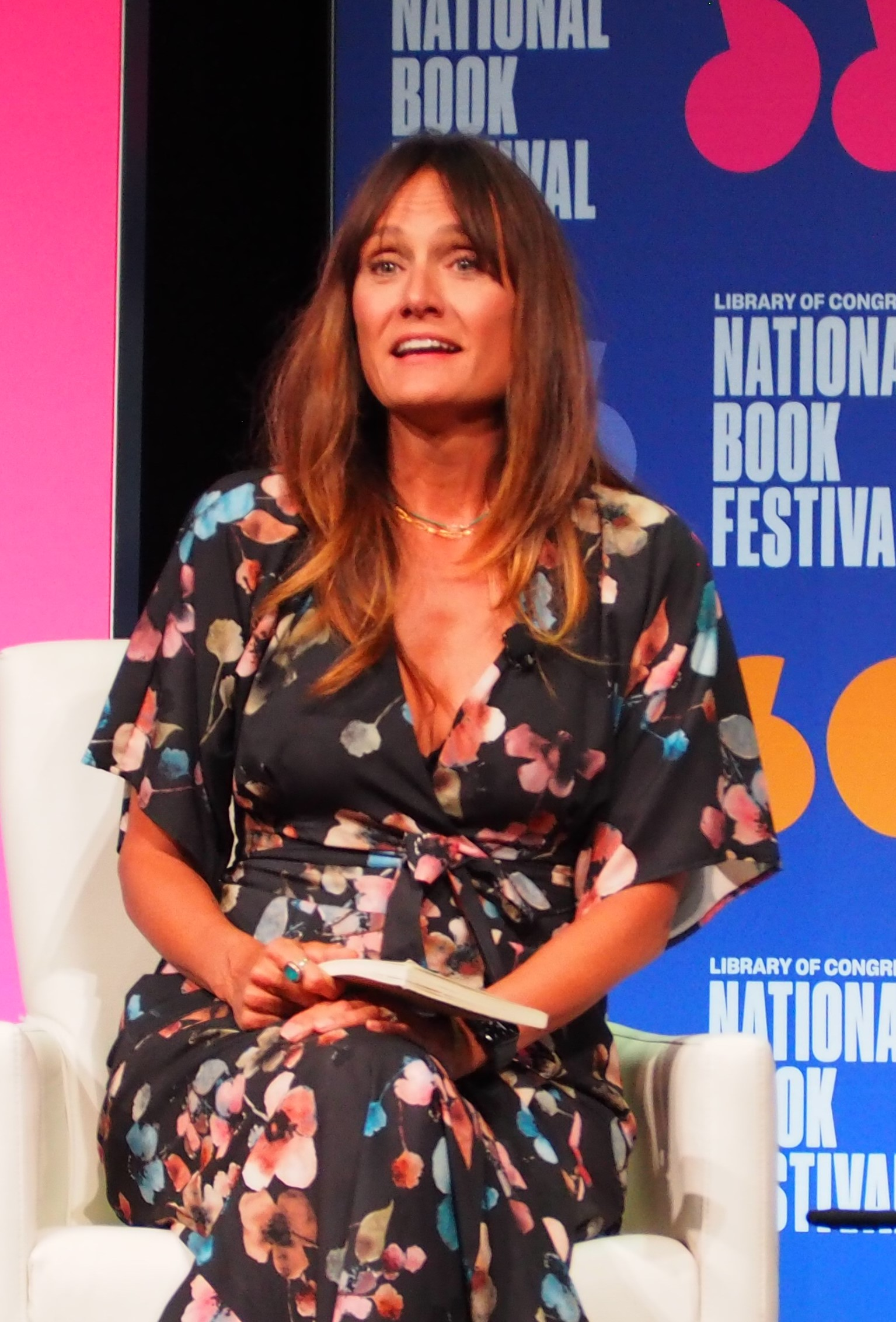
- Martin at the 2024 National Book Festival
- Born: 1974 (age 51–52); Salt Lake City, Utah, U.S.
- Education: University of Puget Sound (BA); Columbia University (MA)
- Occupation: Journalist
- Years active: 2003–present

Rachel Martin (born 1974) is an American journalist for NPR. She previously co-hosted the radio news program Morning Edition and was previously a producer and reporter for KQED in San Francisco.

== Early life and education ==
Martin was born in 1974 in Salt Lake City, Utah, and raised in Idaho Falls, Idaho, where she graduated from Idaho Falls High School in 1992. She graduated from University of Puget Sound in Tacoma, Washington, with a bachelor's degree in politics and government in 1996, and from the School of International and Public Affairs at Columbia University in New York City with a master's degree in international affairs in 2003.

== Career ==
Martin was a producer and reporter for KQED in San Francisco. In 2003, she was a freelance reporter in Afghanistan, also for NPR. From 2005 to 2007, Martin was foreign correspondent for NPR. In 2007, she covered the Virginia Tech shooting. In 2008, she was a correspondent for ABC News. Martin was one of the hosts of NPR's Bryant Park Project, a New York-based experimental morning news program designed to attract a younger demographic.

In 2010, Martin was National Security Correspondent for NPR, during which time she reported on the US counterinsurgency efforts. She took over as host of Weekend Edition Sunday in 2012, shortly after longtime host Liane Hansen stepped down. She became a co-host of Morning Edition in 2016 when Renée Montagne stepped down. She left the show in early 2023. Having previously worked as the network's religion correspondent from 2006 to 2007, Martin is the creator of Enlighten Me, an NPR special series on religion, spirituality, and meaning.

As of March 2026, Martin hosts the podcast Wild Card with Rachel Martin, which airs through NPR.

== Personal life ==
Martin and her husband have two sons.
