= Scott Simon =

American journalist (born 1952)

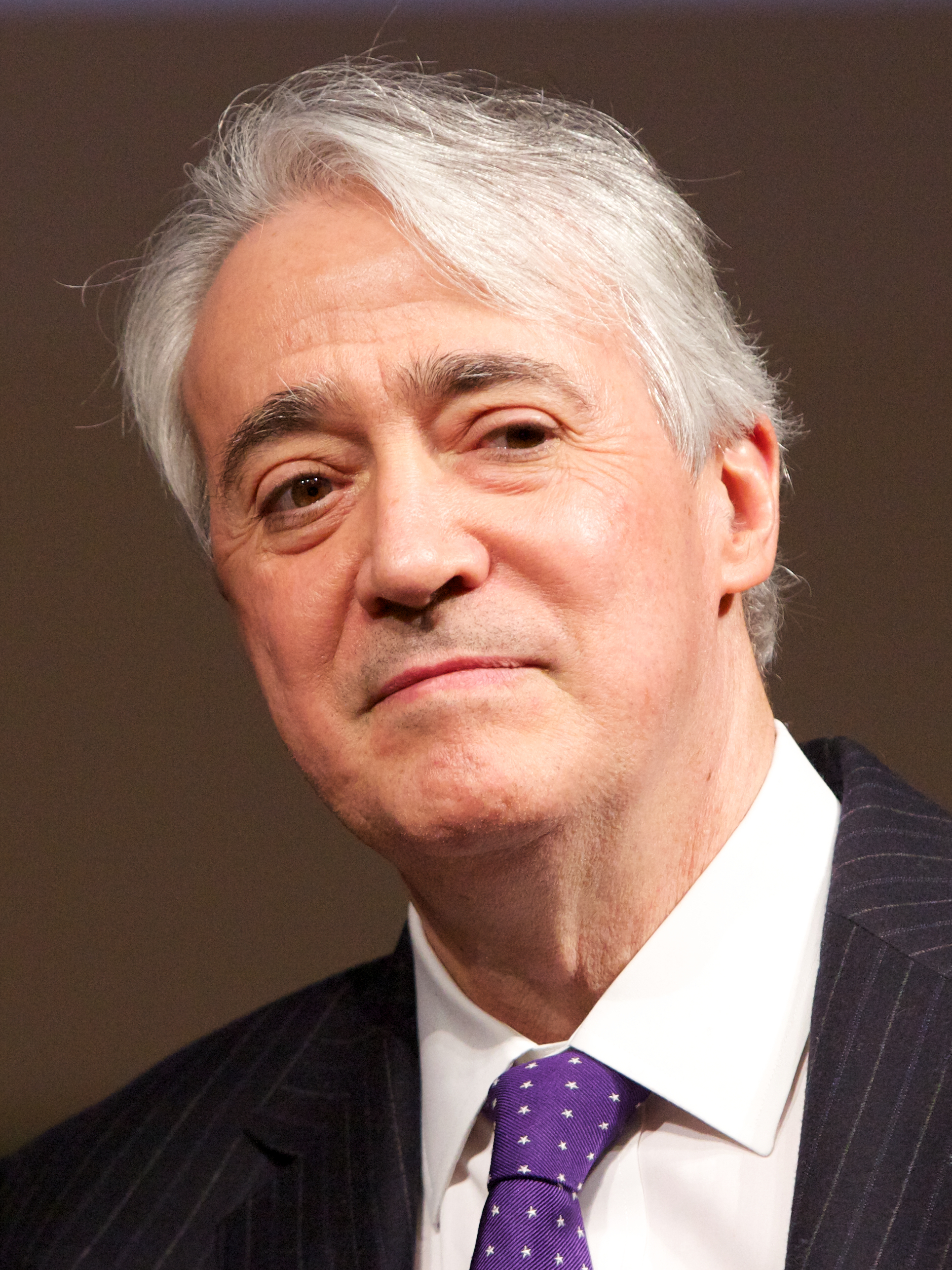
- Simon in 2013
- Born: March 16, 1952 (age 74); Chicago, Illinois, U.S.
- Occupation: Radio presenter
- Years active: 1977–present
- Employer: National Public Radio
- Notable credit: Weekend Edition Saturday
- Spouse: Caroline Richard (m. 2000)
- Children: 2
- Website: ScottSimonBooks.com

Scott Simon (born March 16, 1952) is an American journalist and the host of Weekend Edition Saturday on NPR.

== Early life ==
Simon was born in Chicago, Illinois, the son of comedian Ernie Simon and actress Patricia Lyons. He had a sister who died at a young age. He grew up in major cities across the United States and Canada, including Chicago; New York City; San Francisco; Los Angeles; Montreal; Cleveland; and Washington, D.C.

Simon's father was Jewish and his mother was Irish Catholic. His father died when Scott was 16, and his mother later married former minor league baseball player Ralph G. Newman, an American Civil War scholar and author who ran the Abraham Lincoln Bookshop in Chicago.

Simon graduated from Nicholas Senn High School in 1970.

He attended the University of Chicago and McGill University, and he has received a number of honorary degrees.

== Career ==
Simon has been with NPR for over four decades, beginning in 1977 as Chicago bureau chief. His career also encompasses writing and television. He has hosted the Saturday edition of Weekend Edition since its inception in 1985, excepting a period in 1992 and 1993 when Alex Chadwick hosted the show.

His books include My Cubs: A Love Story (2017); Home and Away: Memoir of a Fan (2000); Jackie Robinson and the Integration of Baseball (2002); Baby, We Were Meant for Each Other: In Praise of Adoption (2010), about his experiences adopting two daughters; and the novels Pretty Birds (2005) and Windy City: A Novel of Politics (2008). In 2023, he published the audiobook, Swingtime for Hitler, about the Nazis' use of jazz as a propaganda tool during World War II.

Simon has hosted television series and specials, including PBS's Need to Know in 2011–13. He guest-hosted BBC World News America, filling in for Matt Frei, and anchored NBC's Weekend Today in 1992–93.

On the November 15, 2014, episode of Weekend Edition Saturday, Simon interviewed Bill Cosby and his wife Camille about a 62-piece art collection they had loaned to the National Museum of African Art. At the end of the interview, Simon offered Cosby an opportunity to comment on the accusations of sexual assault against him. As narrated by Simon, Cosby refused to comment, only shaking his head no when prompted.

=== Controversial views ===
After the September 11 attacks, Simon spoke and wrote in support of the "war on terror", publishing an op-ed in the October 11, 2001, Wall Street Journal titled "Even pacifists must support this war". He questioned nonviolence at greater length in the Quaker publication Friends Journal in December 2001, provoking many angry letters, to which he replied in the May 2003 issue. In 2004, Simon criticized Michael Moore's film Fahrenheit 9/11 for perceived inaccuracies and what he characterized as an unfairly harsh depiction of the U.S. forces.

=== Awards ===
Simon has won Peabody and Emmy awards, and received many honorary degrees.

In May 2010, a degree of Honorary Doctor of Humane Letters was conferred on him by Willamette University, where he was that year's commencement speaker.

Simon is a laureate of The Lincoln Academy of Illinois, receiving the state's highest honor, the Order of Lincoln from the Governor of Illinois in 2016 in the field of Business, Industry & Communications.

In October of 2025, he was inducted into the Radio Hall of Fame at a ceremony in Chicago.

== Personal life ==
As of 2009, Simon lives in Washington, D.C. He has been married to French documentary filmmaker Caroline Richard since September 2000. They have two daughters, both adopted as babies from China. They consider themselves a Jewish family (Simon's father was Jewish and his mother was Catholic).

In 2006 Simon and his wife were contacted by police as part of the Alexander Litvinenko poisoning investigation. The family was staying at a hotel near the restaurant at the center of the poisoning incident, and had bought food there for one of their daughters. The health of the family was not affected.

In July 2013 Simon began tweeting his emotions and conversations with his mother during the last days of her life. "I just realized: she once had to let me go into the big wide world. Now I have to let her go the same way", read one tweet. In March 2015, he published a memoir about her titled Unforgettable: A Son, a Mother, and the Lessons of a Lifetime.

Jack Brickhouse, a Chicago broadcaster (1916–1998), was Simon's godfather, whom he referred to as an uncle.
