= David Greene (journalist) =

American journalist

David Greene (born April 9, 1976) is an American journalist who worked for the radio broadcasting company NPR, and was one of the co-hosts of Morning Edition until his retirement in December 2020. On July 29, 2022, he became the host of Left, Right & Center.

== Early life ==
Greene is the son of Douglas A. Greene and the late Terry Rockmaker Greene. He spent his youth in Pittsburgh, Pennsylvania, where he lived in the Shadyside neighborhood and attended Fanny Edel Falk Laboratory School through the fifth grade. In 1986, he moved with his family to Murray, Kentucky, where he attended Murray Middle School for two years. He graduated from J. P. McCaskey High School in Lancaster, Pennsylvania in 1994. (His mother taught at Franklin and Marshall College.) His first "radio" show was doing the morning announcements at his high school. He also interned at the local newspaper, which is today LNP.

== Career ==
After graduating from Harvard University (where he was an editor of The Harvard Crimson) with a degree in government in 1998, Greene became a reporter for The Baltimore Sun. Among other assignments, including an early stint in local reporting, he covered the White House for George W. Bush's first term.

In 2005, Greene joined NPR and continued to cover the Bush White House. From 2010 to 2012, he was a foreign correspondent for NPR based in Moscow, and in 2012 joined Morning Edition. His reporting from Moscow, including a return in 2013 to travel the Trans-Siberian Railway, led to his first book, Midnight in Siberia, in 2014.

In 2011, Greene received the Daniel Schorr Journalism Prize for his work in Tripoli during the Arab Spring. Greene announced his retirement from NPR in October 2020, with his last Morning Edition broadcast being on December 29, 2020.

In December 2025, Greene acquired LNP | LancasterOnline, moving the news organization to a non-profit structure for the first time in its 231-year History. Greene had interned there while attending high school.

In 2026, Greene filed a lawsuit against Google, alleging that an artificial-intelligence podcast feature in its NotebookLM tool replicated his distinctive radio voice without permission, a claim the company denied.

== Personal life ==
Greene's mother was an associate professor of psychology at Franklin & Marshall College in Lancaster, Pennsylvania for 17 years, and died in 2006. David Greene received an honorary doctorate from the college in 2008, where he spoke at the college's commencement and celebrated his mother's life and career.

Greene married Rose Previte in 2007.
