= Culture of Cuba =

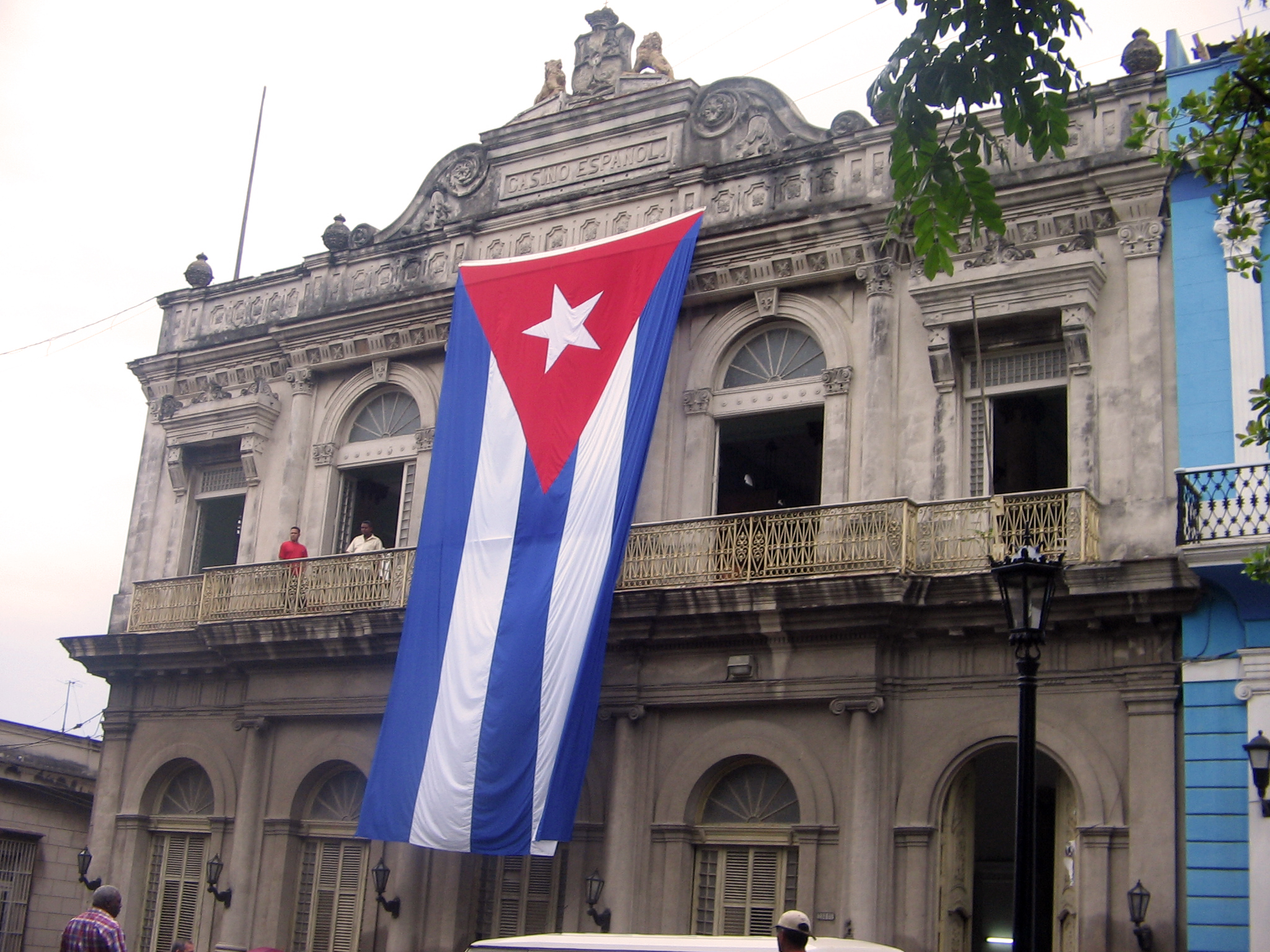
The Casino Español, Matanzas

The culture of Cuba is a complex mixture of different, often contradicting, factors and influences. The Cuban people and their customs are based on European, African and Amerindian influences.

== Music ==
The music of Cuba, including the instruments and the dances, is mostly of European and African origin. Most forms of the present day are creolized fusions and mixtures of these two styles, with very few remains of the original Native traditions.

Fernando Ortíz, the first great Cuban folklorist, described Cuba's musical innovations as arising from the interplay ('transculturation') between African slaves settled on large sugarcane plantations and Spanish or Canary Islanders who grew tobacco on small farms. The African slaves and their descendants reconstructed large numbers of percussive instruments and corresponding rhythms. The main instrumental contribution of Spanish music was the guitar, and the tradition of European musical notation and techniques of musical composition.

African beliefs and practices are most certainly an influence in Cuba's music. Polyrhythmic percussion is an inherent part of African life & music, as melody is part of European music. Also, in African tradition, percussion is always joined to song and dance, and to a particular social setting. It is not simply entertainment added to life, it is life. The result of the meeting of European and African cultures is that most Cuban popular music is creolized. This creolization of Cuban life has been happening for a long time, and by the 20th century, elements of African belief, music and dance were well integrated into popular and folk forms.

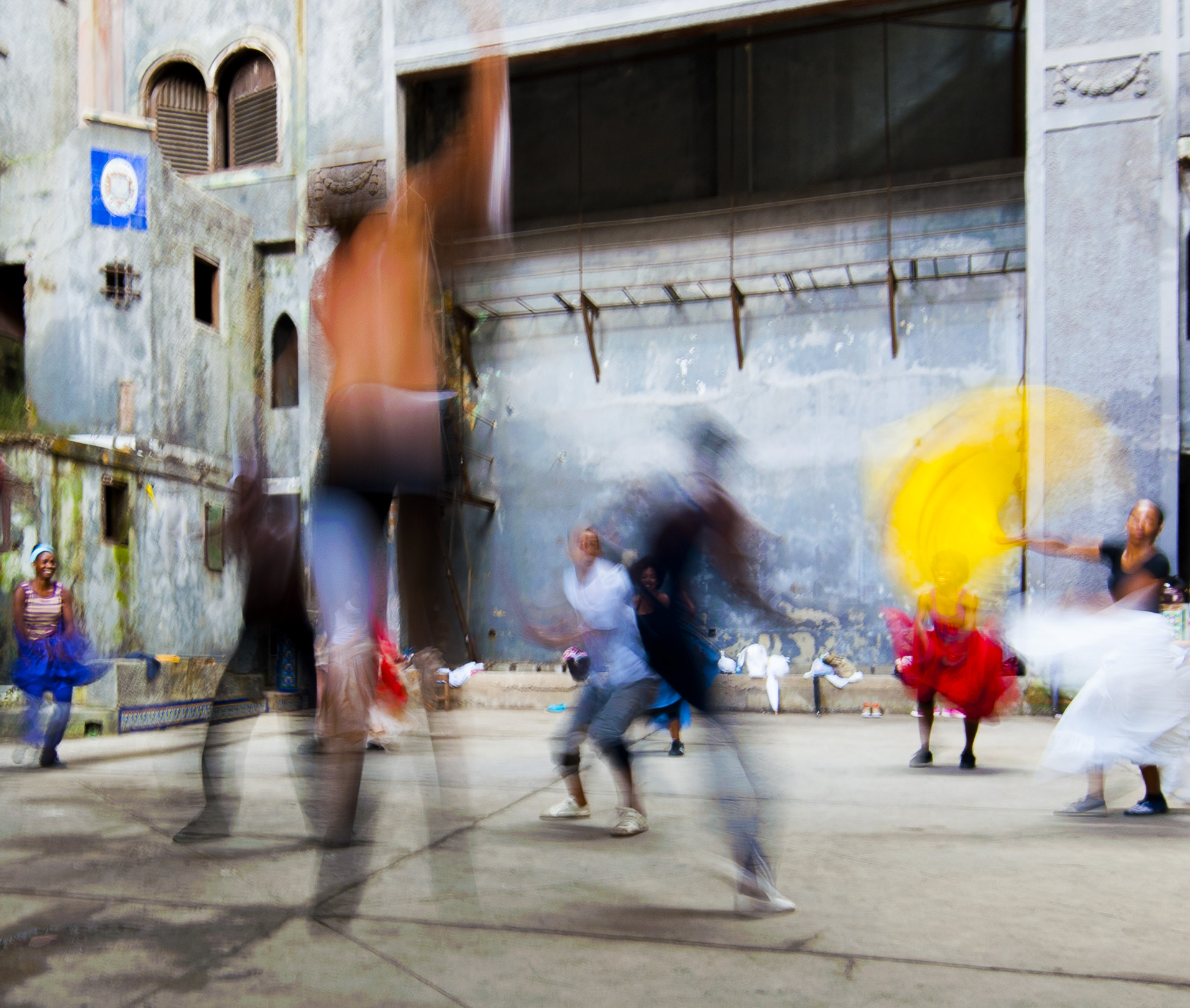
Banrarra Afro-Cuban dance troupe

The roots of most Afro-Cuban musical forms lie in the cabildos, self-organized social clubs for the African slaves, separate cabildos for separate cultures. The cabildos were formed mainly from four groups: the Yoruba (the Lucumi in Cuba); the Congolese (Palo in Cuba); Dahomey (the Fon or Arará). Other cultures were undoubtedly present, but in smaller numbers, and they did not leave such a distinctive presence. At the same time, African religions were transmitted from generation to generation throughout Cuba, Haiti, other islands and Brazil. These religions, which had a similar but not identical structure, were known as Lucumi or Regla de Ocha if they derived from the Yoruba, Palo from Central Africa, Vodú from Haiti, and so on. The term Santería was first introduced to account for the way African spirits were joined to Catholic saints, especially by people who were both baptized and initiated, and so were genuinely members of both groups. By the 20th century, elements of Santería music had appeared in popular and folk forms.

One of the main rhythmic fusions in Cuban music is the son. Other typical Cuban forms are the habanera, the guaracha, the danzón, the rumba, the bolero, the chachachá, the mambo, the punto, and many variations on these themes. Cuban music has been immensely popular and influential in other countries. It was the original basis of salsa and contributed not only to the development of jazz, but also to Argentinian tango, Ghanaian high-life, West African Afrobeat, and Spanish nuevo flamenco. Within modern Cuba, there are also popular musicians working in the rock and reggaeton idioms. Artists such as Gente De zona are the vanguard of music revolution as they are the first Cuban duo to reach the Hot Latin Songs chart on Billboard. Other famous Cuban artist include Camila Cabello who has won a Billboard Award.

Cuban hip-hop is one of the latest genres of music to be embraced not only by the country's youth but also, more reluctantly, by the government. Initially, hip-hop was shunned by the authorities, because of its affiliation to America and capitalism. As more Cuban youth put their own energy and style into the music, Cuban hip-hop eventually became more acceptable. "The Cuban government now sees rap music – long considered the music of American imperialism – as a road map to the hearts and minds of the young generation" is one opinion.

== Sports ==
Fidel Castro's belief and practice of communism and the benefits of sports (he loved and used to play baseball) has resulted in Cuba's relative international success for a population of 11 million in sporting events such as the Olympic Games. Unlike in most of Latin America, but like many nations of the Caribbean and some of Central America, football is not a major game in Cuba, but is gaining popularity. Baseball is the most popular sport in Cuba. Introduced by American dockworkers in Havana in the 19th century, the game has played a role in Cuban independence from Spain. Banned in 1895 by the Spanish, secret games funded José Martí's revolt. Cuban peloteros rank highly internationally and some have migrated to Major League Baseball in the United States. The Cuba national baseball team finished second in the first World Baseball Classic against the Japanese national team. Boxing is also rather popular in Cuba. They also enjoy basketball, track and field, volleyball, and rugby union.

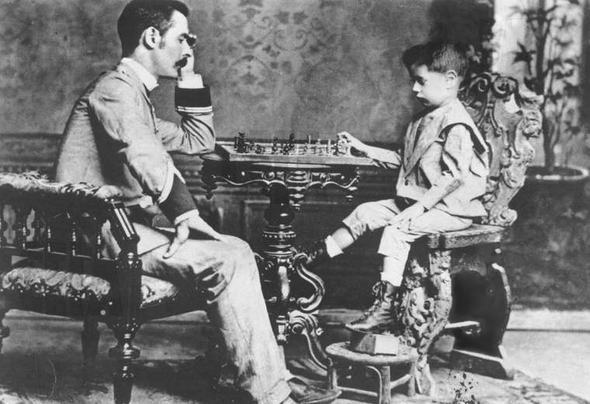
Capablanca playing chess with his father José María Capablanca in 1892

Every year, Cuba holds the School Sports Games, a competition for students. The best athletes from age 11 to 16 are invited to be tested for the Schools for Sports Initiation (Spanish acronym: EIDE). EIDE students attend regular classes, receive advanced coaching, and take part in higher-level competitions. The top graduates from the school enter one of several Schools of Higher Athletic Performance (Spanish acronym: ESPA).

== Chess ==
Cuban chess player, José Capablanca (d.1942) was world chess champion from 1921 to 1927 and his Cuban style influenced future world chess champions Fischer, Botvinnik and Karpov, a span reaching to 1999. Capablanca's style of calm positional play while slowly constricting the opponent was likened to Karpov's "boa constrictor".

Cuba hosted the 17th Chess Olympiad in 1966.

== Cuisine ==
A ration book called a libreta is supposed to guarantee a range of products from shops, however, there are still massive shortages and even rations are not guaranteed to be delivered timely or at all.

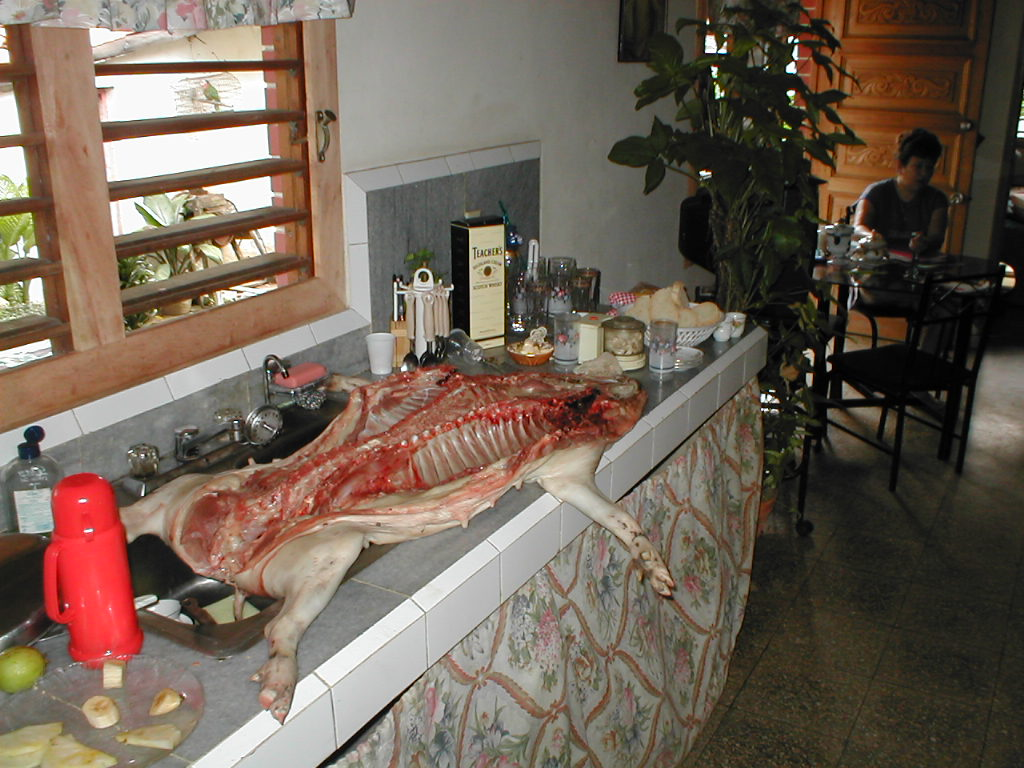
At a casa particular in Viñales, a pig is prepared for a feast.

The Soviet Union's collapse in 1991 ended grain imports from that country, which were used to feed cattle and chickens. In 1991, beef, chicken, milk and eggs became scarce.

A lack of fuel for agricultural machinery meant that crops had to be harvested manually (by people), drastically decreasing Cuba's food production capabilities. These problems have improved a little in recent years, but shortages are still common. To supplement their rations, Cubans resort to non-rationed food stores (where prices are nevertheless several times those of the libreta), or to the black market.

Traditional Cuban food is, as most cultural aspects of this country, a syncretism of Spanish, African, and Caribbean cuisines, with a small but noteworthy Chinese influence. The most popular foods are black beans, rice, and meat.

One example of traditional Cuban cuisine, or criollo as it is called, is moros y cristianos, "Moors and Christians", rice with black beans. Criollo uses many different seasonings, with some of the most common being onion and garlic. Cassava, rice, beans, eggs, tomatoes, lettuce, chicken, beef and pork are all common ingredients.

Coffee is of high quality and is grown mainly for export.

== Religion ==
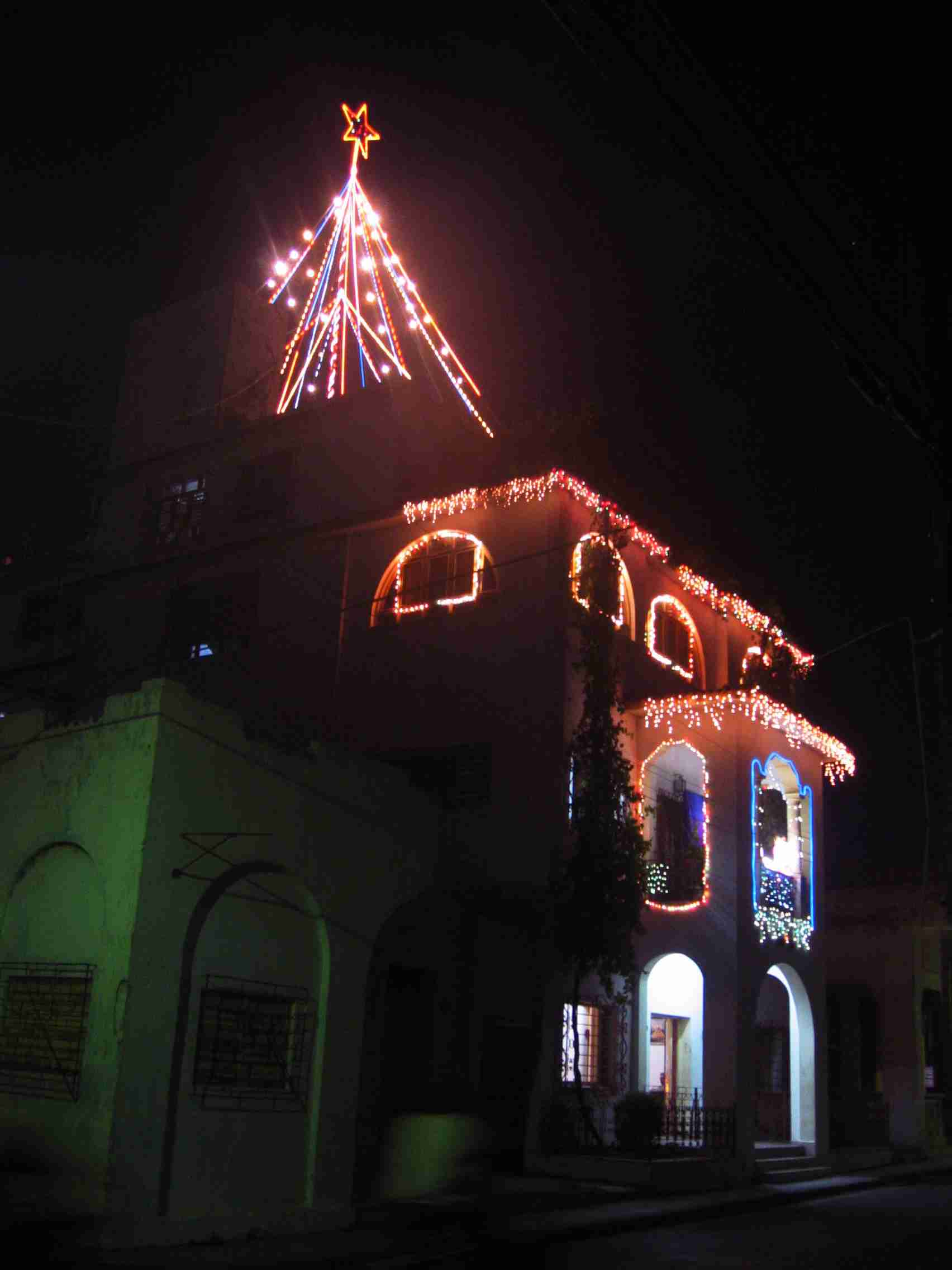
Christmas decorations on a religious house in Santiago de Cuba.

Cuba's policy on religion has changed much since 1959, when religious Cubans were persecuted and could be denied jobs or an education by the government.

In the 1970s, the relationship between the government and religious institutions (especially the Roman Catholic Church) began to improve. By 1976, the state granted Cuban citizens religious freedom, with some restrictions. In 1992, the constitution was amended to allow total spiritual freedom. About 60% of Cubans today are Catholic. Some Catholic traditions were lost, but the church has imported the Mexican Christmas play (pastorela), trying to reconnect Cubans to Christianity. Cuba is a primarily Catholic country.

Another large religion in Cuba is Santería. Santería is a blend of Catholicism and traditional Yoruba religions. When African slaves first arrived in Cuba during the 16th century, they were taught a few simple prayers and were baptised by the Spanish. The slaves combined this limited form of Catholicism with their traditional religions to create Santería, which survives to this day. During colonial times and into the early Republic, many Cubans suffered from intense ethnocentrism and confused Afro-Cuban religion with black magic and witchcraft. This caused them to associate practitioners of Santería and other Afro-Cuban cultures with criminals and the underworld, and to discriminate against practitioners without understanding the nature of their religion. Because most practitioners of Santería in those years were of African heritage, racist attitudes emerged around the religion, and many whites in Cuba considered it to be subversive and threatening. Those who practiced Santería often resorted to secrecy as a way to avoid persecution. Fernando Ortiz, Lydia Cabrera, and Rómulo Lachatañeré are considered the founders of Afro-Cuban studies in Cuba and were the first to give scholarly attention to Santería as an important religion in Cuba.

== Language ==
As a former colony of Spain, Cuba uses the Spanish language. After the Cuban Revolution, the term camarada, meaning "comrade", came to gradually replace the traditional señor/señora as the universal polite title of address for strangers. A significant number of Afro-Cubans as well as biracial Cubans speak Haitian Creole. Haitian Creole is the second-most spoken language as well as a recognized one in Cuba, with approximately 300,000 speakers - about 4% of the population. (Haiti was a French colony - Saint-Domingue - from the early 17th century, and the final years of the 1791–1804 Haitian Revolution brought a wave of French settlers fleeing with their Haitian slaves to Cuba.)

Many words from Cuban Amerindian languages have entered common usage in both Spanish and English, such as the Taíno words canoa, tobacco and huracán. Some of the place names are Indian, such as Guanabacoa and Guanajay.

English is often used in big cities.

== Etiquette ==
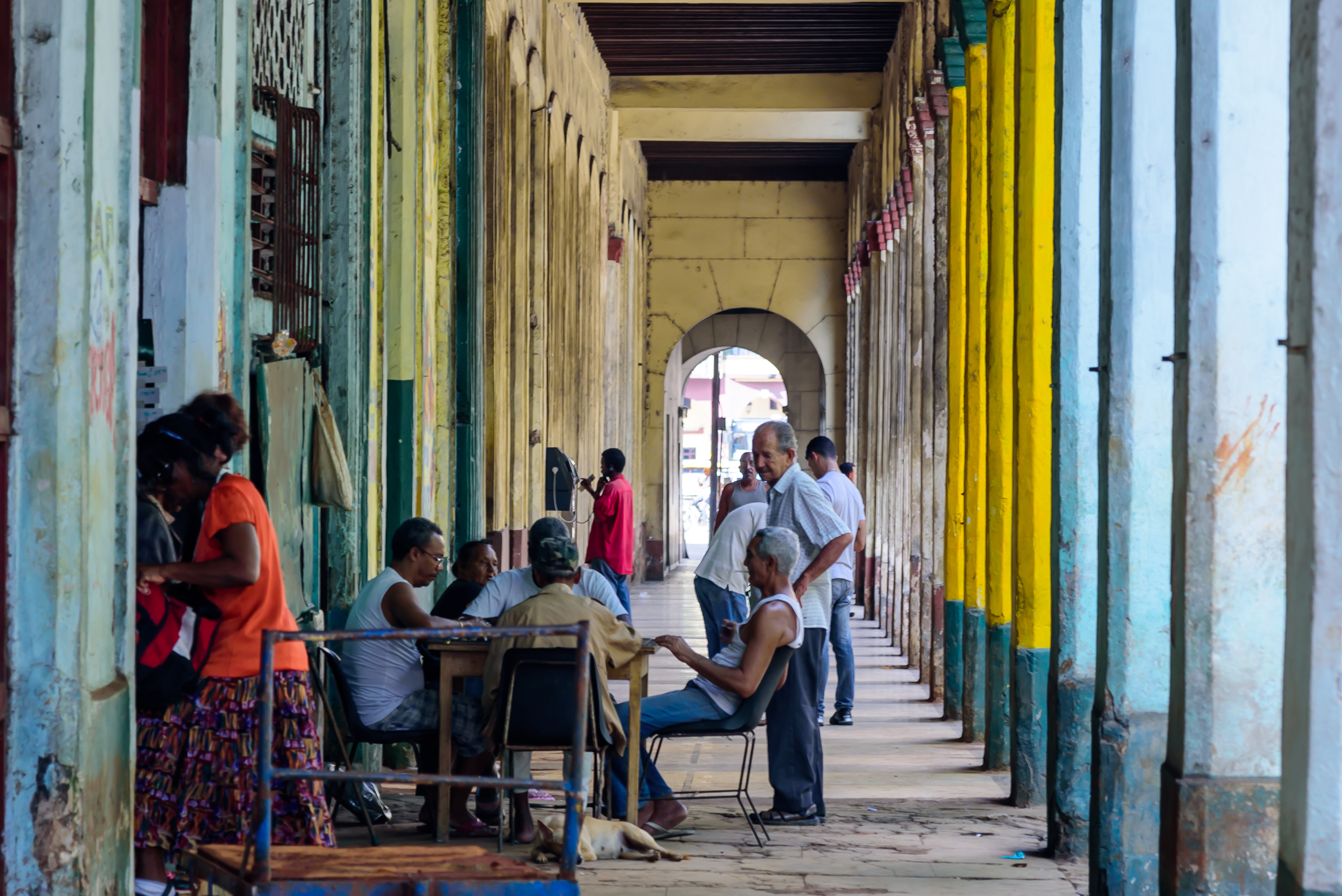
Elderly Cubans playing dominoes

When speaking to the elderly or to strangers, Cubans speak more formally as a sign of respect. They shake hands upon greeting someone and farewelling them. Men often exchange friendly hugs (abrazos), and it is also common for both men and women to greet friends and family with a hug and a kiss on the cheek. Informalities like addressing a stranger with 'mi corazón' (my heart), 'mi vida' (my life), or 'cariño' (dear) occur commonly.

== Cuban family life ==
The Revolution of 1959 sparked a turning point in Cuban family life by promoting women's equality. New laws and policies resulted in women being educated, employed, and increased civil/human rights. Cuban revolutionary thought promoted class equality rather than gender equality, but women still benefited indirectly from social changes. Because Cubans, like many Latin Americans, tend to live together as a nuclear family, grandparents often provide childcare for women in the household who work outside the home or attend school. The Maternity Law actually 'created' the working woman in Cuba. Whereas in 1955, 13 percent of the workforce was women, by 1989, the number had risen to 38.7 percent of the workforce in Cuba. In addition, The Family Code of 1975, especially Article 26 of the code, called for women and men to take equal responsibility for domestic labor and childcare. Marriages, divorce, children's rights, adoption, and marital property were addressed in this new law, as were the division of family responsibilities, equal rights for marriage partners, and the sharing of household tasks. However, there were still 'personal' obligations that women had to assume with marriage, such as 'maternal rights,' which were a norm in Cuban traditional society. Despite progressive measures imposed by law, some traditions remained intact, and new norms for the Cuban family took time to develop.

=== Marriage ===
Marriage rates in Cuba have traditionally been stagnant. In the 1980s and the early 1990s, marriage rates were relatively high, with 151 and 171 marriages per 1000 inhabitants, respectively. University-educated women tended to get married at an older age and have fewer children compared to publicly educated women. Informal relations between a married man and an unmarried woman have been evaluated as such; "28% were women under 30 while the percentage of married women in that time was 23% (as of the late 1980s)." "Women under the age of 20 were 21% opposed to the 7% of women married at that age (still in the same time period).". Yet, this was seen as a typical circumstance in Cuba at that time. Legal marriages vs. illegal marriages are 35% vs. 28%. On average, in the 1980s, most people got married around 19 to 20 years old, still, with a more developed educational system women are becoming more independent, studying, and working better jobs, which has driven change: in "1994 most people [were] getting married around the ages of 30-35." As stipulated by the Family Code of 1977, the legally established minimum age for marriage is 18 years for both girls and boys. Nevertheless, under certain circumstances, girls may marry at the age of 14, and boys at 16, provided they obtain parental consent. In more exceptional cases, court consent may be required.

=== Divorce ===
Divorce rates have been a growing issue in Cuba. When the revolution of 1959 occurred, divorce rates were starting to be observed for the first time. Comparing this information throughout different time periods in Cuban life, in "1960 it was 0.1%, 0.3% in the 1980s, 0.35% in 1990, 0.41% in 1991, 0.51% in 1992.". This contributed to the fact Cubans moving away from the Catholic Church and therefore divorce was no longer a social stigma as it had been in the past. Also, when the economy started picking up and in 1998, the divorce rate returned to the rate in "1990 of 0.35%, and as of 2002 0.354%.". The divorce rate skyrocketed in 1991 and 1992 to a point of collapse, in an almost instantaneous result of the secession of the USSR. "The import/export dropped about 80%," petroleum that was received by Russia ceased, and this did not rebuild (economically) until 2000, when agricultural growth started to pick up. However, Cuba hit rock bottom in 1994, only two years after the succession of the USSR. This was during the Special Period in Cuba, which created additional strain on marriages and split families apart for economic reasons.

=== Birth control/abortion ===
Cuba is somewhat pro-choice despite the historically strong Catholic influence on moral culture in the nation. When Cuba moved away from the Catholic Church, abortion was legalized, and negative social and religious consequences for women faded. The Church has little to no impact on the way women think about abortion. The use of contraceptives, birth control, and abortions seems to keep family sizes somewhat small and "modern" in comparison to other Latin American countries.

=== One-parent families ===
"The state does not give any special aid to one parent families; however, it gives special needs to the children of single parent families. The Cuban government supports women being economically independent, though, dislikes the results of higher divorce rates, more underage impregnated teens, and female-headed households.". With the Family Code of 1975, which aimed at strengthening the standard (two-parent nuclear family), was not the case. Remarriage and re-coupling was common, so divorce rates reflected a minority of Cuba's population as divorce. "As of 1992, couples under the ages of 20 were likely to get divorced," as were couples in urban areas. It is estimated that around "200,000 single parents are present in Cuba." As a matter of fact, observations in the Cuban community in "1992 shows that 15-20% of households with children are headed by women alone."

=== Protection of minors and adoption ===
Pre-Revolutionary attempts for children shelters, protection houses, and places to keep children off the street were clearly expressed by Skaine: As of the 1600s when the "House of the Abandoned" was founded, however was soon neglected, and in 1705 a new management took over the house and named it "Foundling House" though this too was unsuccessful. The "House of Charity" was founded before the revolution, nevertheless, also took its place in the shadows of success because protection of the children and the conditions in which they lived were not guaranteed. In 1959, the Ministry of Social Welfare was created, and the houses were not part of the state. Now it was the state that had to provide for the minors. In 1960 the Government assigned the Federation of Cuban Women (FCW) to take charge of these houses, and set them up accordingly; ages 0–3 (homes with cradles), ages 3–6 (pre-scholastic farms), ages 6–12 (scholastic farms), ages 12–18 (youthful farms). This was then refined with The Family Code of 1975 (giving certain rights/obligations to parents), the Code of the Childhood and the Youth, approved in 1978, and Decree Law 76 of January 1984 (which created a national network of centers that took care of minors without shelter). This new law centered on children up to the age of 5 with daycare, helped with homes for minors ages 6–17, and also helped children who were in school past the age of 17. This gave rise for adoption. The Family Code of 1975 made adoption legal for the protection of minors who were without families. "There were a few stipulations with this, i.e. the adopters had to be 25 years or older, economically stable, morally sound, and be able to conduct their selves as sound parents." Complete adoption is most prominent in Cuba. Complete adoption consists of severing all ties with the adoptees biological parents and that in the adopted family and the child has all the same rights as an actual 'biological' child of that family. Legally adopted children are looked upon as biological children.

== Women ==
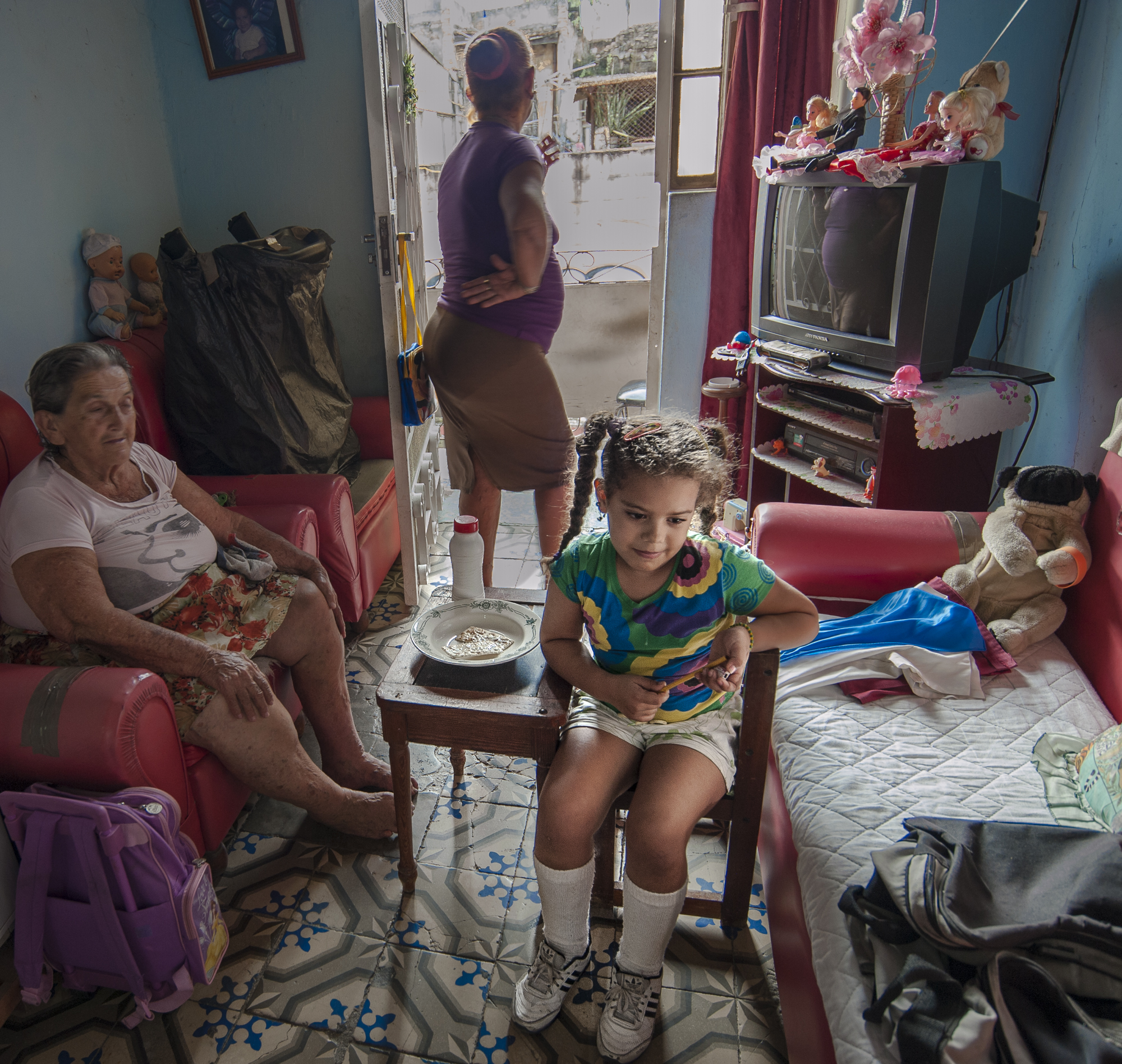
Three generations of women

The Castro government claims to have improved women's rights since the revolution, and today, most women work outside of the home. They are assisted by things such as childcare facilities, which are common in Cuba. In 1974, the Family Code was passed, giving men and women equal rights and responsibilities for housework, childrearing and education. However, despite government policy, and as with much of Latin America, machismo is common, and stereotypes of women continue to exist.

In the Special Period of Cuba, the time after the Soviet Union collapsed and was no longer able to support Cuba financially, leading the small communist nation to seek more tourism. As tourism increased, there followed an increase in prostitution in Cuba.

=== People and dance ===
A dance style recently emerged, which involves fast and suggestive shaking of the women's lower torso section, simulating sexual activity. With this type of dance, the woman's body is seen as more "solo", with moves such as the despelote (all-over-the-place) and tembleque (shake-shudder) and the subasta de la cintura (waist auction). This idea has offended other women, who see this kind of inappropriate behavior as degrading, forcing them to live up to expectations of pleasing their male partners.

Fairley says people in Cuba used to dance by facing their partners, and that nowadays it is often a "back to front" dance. She states that the way women dance with reggaeton can be compared with sex positions and pornography, and claims that Cuba has "open and healthy attitudes toward sexuality".

== Literature ==
Cuban literature began to develop its own style in the early 19th century. The major works published in Cuba during that time dealt with issues of colonialism, slavery and the mixing of races in a creole society. Notable writers of this genre include Gertrudis Gómez de Avellaneda, and Cirilo Villaverde, whose novel Cecilia Valdés was a landmark. Following the abolition of slavery in 1886, the focus of Cuban literature shifted to themes of independence and freedom as exemplified by José Martí, who led the modernista movement in Latin American literature. The poet Nicolás Guillén's famous Motivos del son focused on the interplay between races. Others like Dulce María Loynaz, José Lezama Lima and Alejo Carpentier dealt with more personal or universal issues. And a few more, such as Reinaldo Arenas and Guillermo Cabrera Infante, earned international recognition in the postrevolutionary era.

=== Testimonial literature ===
Cuba is the birthplace of the literary genre that is called testimonial literature. In 1970, Cuba's literary forum Casa de las Américas recognized testimonial literature as an official literary genre. Miguel Barnet's literary texts were foundational in launching this new genre. Specifically, Barnet's 1966 Biografía de un Cimarrón (Biography of a Runaway Slave), where he recorded the oral history of former slave Esteban Montejo, is used to place testimonial literature on the literary platform of Casa de las Américas.

Since Casa de las Américas is a government agency responsible for promoting cultural development, the revolutionary government supports this literary addition and finds it aligned with the spirit of the revolution. In this way, testimonial literature serves the revolutionary ideology in providing a voice for the people, specifically a group of people who were underrepresented and formerly oppressed prior to the Cuban Revolution. For the purpose it serves, this literary genre then gets accredited beyond Cuba and becomes a representative genre in other revolutionary countries, where empowering the majority of its people is important.

According to the author of testimonial texts, a testimony is significant because it uses a direct source: A person's account of current aspects in Latin American reality. Testimonial literature is then defined within the boundaries of autobiographical accounts, documentary narratives, eyewitness reports, and oral histories that are later transcribed into a literary format.

Years after the 1950s and 1960s, a time of political and social unrest in Cuba, testimonial literature acknowledged personal accounts of historical figures such as that of Ernesto Che Guevara and other rebel leaders. Testimonial literature also acknowledged the diaries and letters of ordinary people, such as Olga Alonso, Daura Olema, Mercedes Santos, Mirta Muñiz, and Sandra Gonzalez, women that participated in the literacy campaign and other voluntary programs after the triumph of the Revolution.

In 1997, Daisy Rubiera Castillo's testimonial biography of her mother, Maria de los Reyes Castillo Bueno, Reyita: The Life of a Black Cuban Woman in the Twentieth Century, was a finalist in Casa de las Américas' literary competition. Described as the first Cuban testimonial narrative that used gender as an analytical tool, it constitutes the closest perspective with direct knowledge of the experience we have of Black Cuban women's lives since the period of slavery.

Another example of testimonial literature is Juan Francisco Manzano's (1797–1853) Autobiography of a Slave, which is the only known autobiography written by a slave in Cuba. Though self written many years prior to the identification of testimonial literature, Manzano's personal account of his life as a house slave is worthy of mention, as it fits perfectly into the criteria of this genre, providing a voice for the voiceless.

== See also ==
- Afro-Cuban
- Architecture of Cuba
- Benny Moré
- Chinese Cuban
- Cinema of Cuba
- Cuban American
- Cuban autonomous community movement
- Cuban genealogy
- Cuban Muslim
- Jewish Cuban
- Latin American culture
- List of museums in Cuba
- List of television stations in Cuba
- Our Lady of Charity del Cobre
- Public holidays in Cuba
- Salón de Mayo
- White Cuban
- Yorùbá mythology
