= Boder =

Boder may refer to:

== People ==
- David P. Boder (1886–1961), Latvian-American professor of psychology
- Gerd Boder (1933–1992), German composer
- Michael Boder (1958–2024), German conductor

== Places ==
- Boder, Rottenmann, Germany
