= Oral history =

History taken verbally and recorded or transcribed

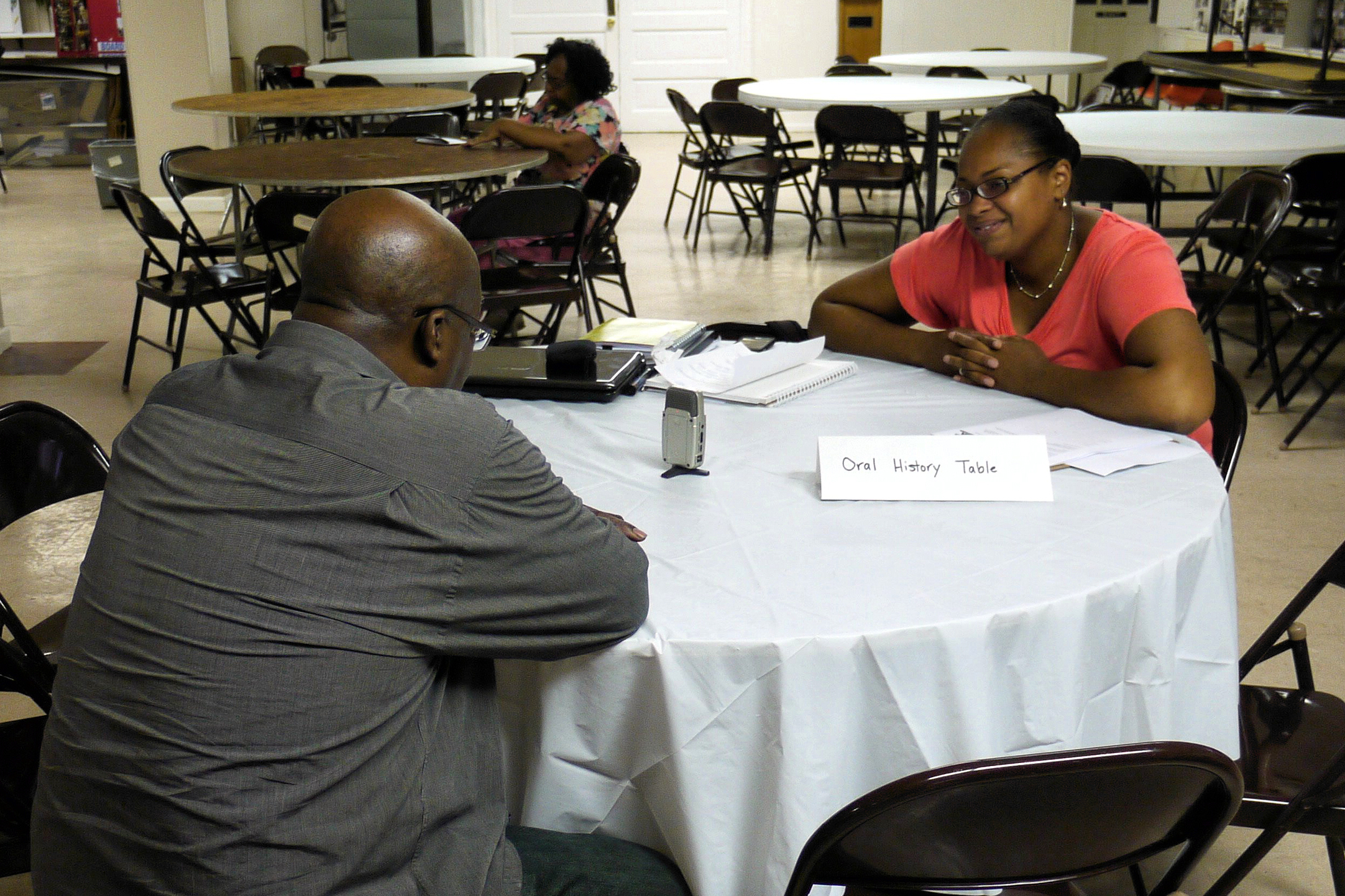
An Evergreen Protective Association volunteer recording an oral history at Greater Rosemont History Day

Oral history is the collection and study of historical information from people, families, important events, or everyday life by using audiotapes, videotapes, or transcriptions of planned interviews. The interviews are conducted with people who participated in or observed past events and whose memories and perceptions of these are to be preserved as an aural record for future generations. Oral history strives to obtain information from different perspectives and most of these cannot be found in written sources.

Oral history also refers to information gathered in that manner and to a written work (published or unpublished) based on such data, which is often preserved in archives and large libraries. Knowledge presented by oral history is unique in that it shares the tacit perspective, thoughts, opinions, and understanding of the interviewee in its primary form.

The term is sometimes used in a more general sense to refer to the study of information about past events that witnesses told anybody else, but professional historians usually consider this to be the study of oral tradition or traditional oral history because the source receives the information aurally.

== Overview ==
It is believed that the term oral history originates with Joe Gould, a homeless man living in New York City who solicited donations by claiming that he was working on a massive manuscript called "An Oral History of Our Time", which he said consisted of thousands of recorded conversations on various topics. Although he was known to have a history of mental illness and violence, Gould was beloved by some writers in Greenwich Village, including Ezra Pound and E. E. Cummings. His writing, supposedly excerpts from the "Oral History", was published in elite literary magazines, and he was eventually profiled in The New Yorker.

One of the earliest academic oral history projects was Columbia University's Oral History Research Office, which was established in 1948 by Professor Allan Nevins. It consists of almost 8,000 taped memoirs and nearly 1,000,000 pages of transcript; it is the oldest and still largest organized oral history programs in the world.

Oral history has become an international movement in historical research. This is partly attributed to the development of information technology, which allowed a method rooted in orality to contribute to research, particularly the use of personal testimonies made in a wide variety of public settings. For instance, oral historians have discovered the endless possibilities of posting data and information on the Internet by making them readily available to scholars, teachers, and ordinary people. This reinforced the viability of oral history since the new modes of transmission allowed history to get off archival shelves and reach the larger community.

Oral historians in different countries have approached the collection, analysis, and dissemination of oral history in different modes. There are many ways of creating and studying oral histories even within individual national contexts.

According to the Columbia Encyclopedia:, the accessibility of tape recorders in the 1960s and 1970s led to oral documentation of the era's movements and protests. Following this, oral history has increasingly become a respected record type. Some oral historians now also account for the subjective memories of interviewees due to the research of Italian historian Alessandro Portelli and his associates.

Oral histories are also used in many communities to document the experiences of survivors of tragedies. Following the Holocaust, there has emerged a rich tradition of oral history, particularly of Jewish survivors. The United States Holocaust Memorial Museum has an extensive archive of over 70,000 oral history interviews. There are also several organizations dedicated specifically to collecting and preserving oral histories of survivors. Oral history as a discipline has fairly low barriers to entry, so it is an act in which laypeople can readily participate. In his book Doing Oral History, Donald Ritchie wrote that "oral history has room for both the academic and the layperson. With reasonable training... anyone can conduct a useable oral history." This is especially meaningful in cases like the Holocaust, where survivors may be less comfortable telling their story to a journalist than they would be to a historian or family member.

In the United States, there are several organizations dedicated to doing oral history which are not affiliated with universities or specific locations. StoryCorps is one of the most well-known of these: following the model of the Federal Writers’ Project created as part of the Works Progress Administration, StoryCorps’ mission is to record the stories of Americans from all walks of life. On contrast to the scholarly tradition of oral history, StoryCorps subjects are interviewed by people they know. There are a number of StoryCorps initiatives that have targeted specific populations or problems, following in the tradition of using oral history as a method to amplify voices that might otherwise be marginalized.

The development of digital databases with their text-search tools is one of the important aspects to the technology-based oral historiography. These made it easier to collect and disseminate oral history since access to millions of documents on national and international levels can be instantaneous.

An oral history interview detailing a family history, an heirloom, and local practices around Kohl making and usage

== Growth and development ==
=== In Europe ===
==== Great Britain and Ireland ====
Since the early 1970s, oral history in Britain has grown from being a method in folklore studies (see for example the work of the School of Scottish Studies in the 1950s) to becoming a key component in community histories. Oral history continues to be an important means by which non-academics can actively participate in the compilation and study of history. Practitioners in a wide range of academic disciplines have also developed the method into a way of recording, understanding, and archiving narrated memories. Influences have included women's history and labour history.

In Britain, the Oral History Society has played a key role in facilitating and developing the use of oral history.

A more complete account of the history of oral history in Britain and Northern Ireland can be found at "Making Oral History" on the Institute of Historical Research's website.

The Bureau of Military History conducted over 1700 interviews with veterans of the First World War and Irish revolutionary period in Ireland. The documentation was released for research in 2003.

During 1998 and 1999, 40 BBC local radio stations recorded personal oral histories from a broad cross-section of the population for The Century Speaks series. The result was 640 half-hour radio documentaries, broadcast in the final weeks of the millennium, and one of the largest single oral history collections in Europe, the Millennium Memory Bank (MMB). The interview-based recordings are held by the British Library Sound Archive in the oral history collection.

In one of the largest memory projects anywhere, the BBC in 2003-06 invited its audiences to send in recollections of the home front in the Second World War. It put 47,000 of the recollections online, along with 15,000 photographs.

=== In Italy ===
Alessandro Portelli is an Italian oral historian. He is known for his work which compared workers' experiences in Harlan County, Kentucky and Terni, Italy. Other oral historians have drawn on Portelli's analysis of memory, identity, and the construction of history.

=== In post-Soviet/Eastern bloc states ===
==== Belarus ====
As of 2015, since the government-run historiography in modern Belarus almost fully excludes repression during the epoch when Belarus was part of the Soviet Union, only private initiatives cover the oral memories of the Belarusians. Citizens' groups in Belarus use the methods of oral history and record narrative interviews on video; the Virtual Museum of Soviet Repression in Belarus presents a full virtual museum with intense use of oral history.

==== Czech Republic ====
Czech oral history began to develop beginning in the 1980s with a focus on social movements and political activism. The practice of oral history and any attempts to document stories prior to this is fairly unknown. The practice of oral history began to take shape in the 1990s. In 2000, The Oral History Center (COH) at the Institute of Contemporary History, Academy of Sciences, Czech Republic (AV ČR) was established with the aim of "systematically support the development of oral history methodology and its application in historical research".

In 2001, Post Bellum, a nonprofit organization, was established to "documents the memories of witnesses of the important historical phenomenons of the 20th century" within the Czech Republic and surrounding European countries. Post Bellum works in partnership with Czech Radio and Institute for the Study of Totalitarian Regimes. Their oral history project Memory of Nation was created in 2008 and interviews are archived online for user access. As of January 2015, the project has more than 2100 published witness accounts in several languages, with more than 24,000 pictures.

Other projects, including articles and books have been funded by the Czech Science Foundation (AV ČR) including:

- "Students in the Period of the Fall of Communism – Life Stories" published as the book One Hundred Student Revolutions (1999) by M. Vaněk and M. Otáhal;
- "Political Elites and Dissidents during the Period of So-called Normalization – Historical Interviews" which resulted in Victors? Vanquished (2005), a two-volume collection of 50 interviews;
- A compilation of original interpretive essays entitled The Powerful?! or Helpless?!
- "An Investigation into Czech Society during the 'Normalization' Era: Biographic Narratives of Workers and the Intelligentsia" and
- A book of interpretations called Ordinary People...?! (2009).

These publications aim to demonstrate that oral history contributes to the understanding of human lives and history itself, such as the motives behind the dissidents' activities, the formation of opposition groups, communication between dissidents and state representatives and the emergence of ex-communist elites and their decision-making processes.

Oral history centers in the Czech Republic emphasize educational activities (seminars, lectures, conferences), archiving and maintaining interview collections, and providing consultations to those interested in the method.

=== In Spain ===
Because of repression in Francoist Spain (1939–75), the development of oral history in Spain was quite limited until the 1970s. It became well-developed in the early 1980s, and often had a focus on the Civil War years (1936–39), especially regarding the ones who lost the war and whose stories had been suppressed. At the University of Barcelona, Professor Mercedes Vilanova was a leading scholar, who combined oral history with her interest in quantification and social history. Barcelona scholars sought to integrate oral sources with traditional written sources to create mainstream, not ghettoized, historical interpretations. They sought to give a public voice to neglected groups, such as women, illiterates, political leftists, and ethnic minorities. In 1987, at Universidade De Santiago de Compostela, Marc Wouters and Isaura Varela started an oral history project focused on the Spanish Civil War, exile, and migration. The project explored victims of the war and the Francoist Dictatorship and includes 2100 interviews and 800 hours of audio.

=== In the United States ===
Oral history began with a focus on national leaders in the United States, but has expanded to include groups representing the entire population. In Britain, the influence of 'history from below' and interviewing people who had been 'hidden from history' was more influential. In both countries, elite oral history has emerged as an important strand. Scientists, for example, have been covered in numerous oral history projects. Doel (2003) discusses the use of oral interviews by scholars as primary sources, He lists major oral history projects in the history of science begun after 1950. Oral histories, he concludes, can augment the biographies of scientists and help spotlight how their social origins influenced their research. Doel acknowledges the common concerns historians have regarding the validity of oral history accounts. He identifies studies that used oral histories successfully to provide critical and unique insight into otherwise obscure subjects, such as the role scientists played in shaping US policy after World War II. Interviews furthermore can provide road maps for researching archives, and can even serve as a fail-safe resource when written documents have been lost or destroyed. Roger D. Launius (2003) shows the huge size and complexity of the National Aeronautics and Space Administration (NASA) oral history program since 1959. NASA systematically documented its operations through oral histories. They can help to explore broader issues regarding the evolution of a major federal agency. The collection consists primarily of oral histories conducted by scholars working on books about the agency. Since 1996, it has included oral histories of senior NASA administrators and officials, astronauts, and project managers, part of a broader project to document the lives of key agents. Launius emphasizes efforts to include such less-well-known groups within the agency as the Astrobiology Program, and to collect the oral histories of women in NASA.

==== Folklore roots and ordinary people ====
Contemporary oral history involves recording or transcribing eyewitness accounts of historical events. Some anthropologists started collecting recordings (at first especially of Native American folklore) on phonograph cylinders in the late 19th century. In the 1930s, the Federal Writers' Project—part of the Works Progress Administration (WPA)—sent out interviewers to collect accounts from various groups, including surviving witnesses of the Civil War, slavery, and other major historical events. The Library of Congress also began recording traditional American music and folklore onto acetate discs. With the development of audio tape recordings after World War II, the task of oral historians became easier.

In 1946, David P. Boder, a professor of psychology at the Illinois Institute of Technology in Chicago, traveled to Europe to record long interviews with "displaced persons"—most of them Holocaust survivors. Using the first device capable of capturing hours of audio—the wire recorder—Boder came back with the first recorded Holocaust testimonials and in all likelihood the first recorded oral histories of significant length.

Over some forty years, Fran Leeper Buss interviewed marginalized women such as Jesusita Aragon, a traditionally trained midwife, and Maria Elena Lucas a migrant farm worker activist, using transcripts of the interviews to write their life stories.

Many state and local historical societies have oral history programs. Sinclair Kopp (2002) reported on the Oregon Historical Society's program. It began in 1976 with the hiring of Charles Digregorio, who had studied at Columbia with Nevins. Thousands of sound recordings, reel-to-reel tapes, transcriptions, and radio broadcasts have made it one of the largest collections of oral history on the Pacific Coast. In addition to political figures and prominent businessmen, the Oregon Historical Society has done interviews with minorities, women, farmers, and other ordinary citizens, who have contributed extraordinary stories reflecting the state's cultural and social heritage. Hill (2004) encourages oral history projects in high school courses. She demonstrates a lesson plan that encourages the study of local community history through interviews. By studying grassroots activism and the lived experiences of its participants, her high school students came to appreciate how African Americans worked to end Jim Crow laws in the 1950s.

Mark D. Naison (2005) describes the Bronx African American History Project (BAAHP), an oral community history project developed by the Bronx County Historical Society. Its goal was to document the histories of black working- and middle-class residents of the South Bronx neighborhood of Morrisania in New York City since the 1940s.

=== In Asia ===
==== Syria ====
Katharina Lange studied the tribal histories of Syria. The oral histories in this area could not be transposed into tangible, written form due to their positionalities, which Lange describes as "taking sides". The positionality of oral history could lead to conflict and tension. The tribal histories are typically narrated by men. While histories are also told by women, they are not accepted locally as "real history". Oral histories often detail the lives and feats of ancestors.

Genealogy is a prominent subject in the area. According to Lange, the oral historians often tell their own personalized genealogies to demonstrate their credibility, both in their social standing and their expertise in the field.

==== China ====
The rise of oral history is a new trend in historical studies in China that began in the late twentieth century. Some oral historians, stress the collection of eyewitness accounts of the words and deeds of important historical figures and what happened during those important historical events, which is similar to common practice in the west, while the others focus more on important people and event, asking important figures to describe the decision making and details of important historical events. In December 2004, the Chinese Association of Oral History Studies was established. The establishment of this institution is thought to signal that the field of oral history studies in China has finally moved into a new phase of organized development.

==== Uzbekistan ====
From 2003 to 2004, Professors Marianne Kamp and Russell Zanca researched agricultural collectivization in Uzbekistan in part by using oral history methodology to fill in gaps in information missing from the Central State Archive of Uzbekistan. The goal of the project was to learn more about life in the 1920s and 1930s to study the impact of the Soviet Union's conquest. 20 interviews each were conducted in the Fergana valley, Tashkent, Bukhara, Khorezm, and Kashkadarya regions. Their interviews uncovered stories of famine and death that had not been widely known outside of local memory in the region.

==== Southeast Asia ====
While oral tradition is an integral part of ancient Southeast Asian history, oral history is a relatively recent development. Since the 1960s, oral history has been accorded increasing attention on institutional and individual levels, representing "history from above" and "history from below".

In Oral History and Public Memories, Blackburn writes about oral history as a tool that was used "by political elites and state-run institutions to contribute to the goal of national building" in postcolonial Southeast Asian countries. Blackburn draws most of his examples of oral history as a vehicle for "history from above" from Malaysia and Singapore.

In terms of "history from below", various oral history initiatives are being undertaken in Cambodia in an effort to record lived experiences from the rule of the Khmer Rouge regime while survivors are still living. These initiative take advantage of crowdsourced history to uncover the silences imposed on the oppressed.

==== South Asia ====
Two prominent and ongoing oral history projects out of South Asia stem from time periods of ethnic violence that were decades apart: 1947 and 1984.

The 1947 Partition Archive was founded in 2010 by Guneeta Singe Bhalla, a physicist in Berkeley, California, who began conducting and recording interviews "to collect and preserve the stories of those who lived through this tumultuous time, to make sure this great human tragedy isn't forgotten".

The Sikh Diaspora Project was founded in 2014 by Brajesh Samarth, senior lecturer in Hindi-Urdu at Emory University in Atlanta, when he was a lecturer at Stanford University in California. The project focuses on interviews with members of the Sikh diaspora in the U.S. and Canada, including the many who migrated after the 1984 massacre of Sikhs in India.

=== In Oceania ===
==== Australia ====
Hazel de Berg began recording Australian writers, artists, musicians and others in the Arts community in 1957. She conducted nearly 1300 interviews. Together with the National Library of Australia, she was a pioneer in the field in Australia, working together for twenty-seven years.

In December 1997, in response to the first recommendation of the Bringing Them Home: Report of the National Inquiry into the Separation of Aboriginal and Torres Strait Islander Children from Their Families report, the Australian Government announced funding for the National Library to develop and manage an oral history project. The Bringing Them Home Oral History Project (1998–2002) collected and preserved the stories of Indigenous Australians and others involved in or affected by the child removals resulting in the Stolen Generations. Other contributors included missionaries, police and government administrators.

There are now many organisations and projects all over Australia involved in recording oral histories from Australians of all ethnicities and in all walks of life. Oral History Victoria support an annual Oral history award as part of the Victorian Community History Awards held annually to recognise the contributions made by Victorians in the preservation of the state's history, published during the previous year.

== Academia and institutions ==
In 1948, Allan Nevins, a Columbia University historian, established the Columbia Oral History Research Office, now known as the Columbia Center for Oral History Research, with a mission of recording, transcribing, and preserving oral history interviews. The Regional Oral History Office was founded in 1954 as a division of the University of California, Berkeley's Bancroft Library. In 1967, American oral historians founded the Oral History Association, and British oral historians founded the Oral History Society in 1969. In 1981, Mansel G. Blackford, a business historian at Ohio State University, argued that oral history was a useful tool to write the history of corporate mergers. More recently, Harvard Business School launched the Creating Emerging Markets project, which "explores the evolution of business leadership in Africa, Asia, and Latin America throughout recent decades" through oral history. "At its core are interviews, many on video, by the School's faculty with leaders or former leaders of firms and NGOs who have had a major impact on their societies and enterprises across three continents." There are now numerous national organizations and an International Oral History Association, which hold workshops and conferences and publish newsletters and journals devoted to oral history theory and practices. Specialized collections of oral history sometimes have archives of widespread global interest; an example is the Lewis Walpole Library in Farmington, Connecticut, a department of the University Library of Yale.

== Methods ==
External videos
- How to Record an Oral History Interview, University of Leicester

Historians, folklorists, anthropologists, human geographers, sociologists, journalists, linguists, and many others employ some form of interviewing in their research. Although multi-disciplinary, oral historians have promoted common ethics and standards of practice, most importantly the attaining of the "informed consent" of those being interviewed. Usually this is achieved through a deed of gift, which also establishes copyright ownership that is critical for publication and archival preservation.

Oral historians generally prefer to ask open-ended questions and avoid leading questions that encourage people to say what they think the interviewer wants them to say. Some interviews are "life reviews", conducted with people at the end of their careers. Other interviews focus on a specific period or a specific event in people's lives, such as in the case of war veterans or survivors of a hurricane.

Feldstein (2004) considers oral history to be akin to journalism, Both are committed to uncovering truths and compiling narratives about people, places, and events. Felstein says each could benefit from adopting techniques from the other. Journalism could benefit by emulating the exhaustive and nuanced research methodologies used by oral historians. The practice of oral historians could be enhanced by utilizing the more sophisticated interviewing techniques employed by journalists, in particular, the use of adversarial encounters as a tactic for obtaining information from a respondent.

The first oral history archives focused on interviews with prominent politicians, diplomats, military officers, and business leaders. By the 1960s and '70s, influenced by the rise of new social history, interviewing began to be employed more often when historians investigated history from below. Whatever the field or focus of a project, oral historians attempt to record the memories of many different people when researching a given event. Interviewing a single person provides a single perspective. People misremember events or distort their accounts for various reasons. By interviewing widely, oral historians seek points of agreement among many different sources, and also record the complexity of the issues. The nature of memories is as much a part of the practice of oral history as are the stories collected.

== Archaeology ==
Archaeologists sometimes conduct oral history interviews to learn more about unknown artifacts. Oral interviews can provide narratives, social meaning, and contexts for objects. When describing the use of oral histories in archaeological work, Paul Mullins emphasizes the importance of using these interviews to replace "it-narratives". It-narratives are the voices from objects themselves rather than people; according to Mullins, these lead to narratives that are often "sober, pessimistic, or even dystopian".

Oral history interviews were used to provide context and social meaning in the Overstone excavation project in Northumberland. Overstone consists of a row of four cottages. The excavation team, consisting of Jane Webster, Louise Tolson, Richard Carlton, and volunteers, found the discovered artifacts difficult to identify. The team first took the artifacts to an archaeology group, but the only person with knowledge about a found fragment recognized the fragment from a type of pot her mother had. This inspired the team to conduct group interviews volunteers who grew up in households using such objects. The team took their reference collection of artifacts to the interviews in order to trigger the memories of volunteers, revealing a "shared cultural identity".

== Legal interpretations ==
In 1997, the Supreme Court of Canada, in the Delgamuukw v. British Columbia trial, ruled that, in the context of "Aboriginal title" claims, oral histories were just as important as written testimony.

Writers who use oral history have often discussed its relationship to historical truth. Gilda O'Neill writes in Lost Voices, an oral history of East End hop-pickers: "I began to worry. Were the women's, and my, memories true or were they just stories? I realised that I had no 'innocent' sources of evidence – facts. I had, instead, the stories and their tellers' reasons for remembering in their own particular ways.' Duncan Barrett, one of the co-authors of The Sugar Girls describes some of the perils of relying on oral history accounts: "On two occasions, it became clear that a subject was trying to mislead us about what happened – telling a self-deprecating story in one interview, and then presenting a different, and more flattering, version of events when we tried to follow it up. ... often our interviewees were keen to persuade us of a certain interpretation of the past, supporting broad, sweeping comments about historical change with specific stories from their lives." Alessandro Portelli argues that oral history is valuable nevertheless: "it tells us less about events as such than about their meaning [...] the unique and precious element which oral sources force upon the historian ... is the speaker's subjectivity."

Regarding the accuracy of oral history, Jean-Loup Gassend concludes in the book Autopsy of a Battle, "I found that each witness account can be broken down into two parts: 1) descriptions of events that the witness participated in directly, and 2) descriptions of events that the witness did not actually participate in, but that he heard about from other sources. The distinction between these two parts of a witness account is of the highest importance. I noted that concerning events that the witnesses participated in, the information provided was surprisingly reliable, as was confirmed by comparison with other sources. The imprecision or mistakes usually concerned numbers, ranks, and dates, the first two tending to become inflated with time. Concerning events that the witness had not participated in personally, the information was only as reliable as whatever the source of information had been (various rumors); that is to say, it was often very unreliable and I usually discarded such information."

In 2006, American historian Caroline Elkins published Imperial Reckoning: The Untold Story of Britain's Gulag in Kenya, detailing the Mau Mau Uprising against British rule and its suppression by the colonial government. The work received both praise and criticism over its usage of oral testimony from Kenyans. Three years later in 2009, a group of Kenyans who had been interned in concentration camps during the rebellion by the colonial authorities filed a lawsuit against the British government. The case, known as Mutua and Five Others versus the Foreign and Commonwealth Office, was heard at the High Court of Justice in London with the Honourable Justice McCombe presiding. Oral testimony detailing abuses by colonial officials, recorded by Elkins in Imperial Reckoning, was cited as evidence by the prosecution during the case, British lawyer Martyn Day and the Kenya Human Rights Commission. During the trial, over the course of discovery the FCO discovered some 300 boxes of previously undisclosed files that validated Elkins' claims in Imperial Reckoning and provided new evidence supporting the claimants' case. McCombe eventually ruled in the Kenyan claimants' favor, stressing the "substantial documentation supporting accusations of systematic abuses".

== Pros and cons ==
When using oral history as a source material, several caveats exist. The person being interviewed may not accurately recall factual information such as names or dates, and they may exaggerate. To avoid this, interviewers can do thorough research prior to the interview and formulate questions for the purpose of clarification. There also exists a pre-conceived notion that oral history is less reliable than written records. Written source materials are different in the execution of information, and that they may have additional sources. Oral sources identify intangibles such as atmosphere, insights into character, and clarifications to points made briefly in print. Oral history can also indicate lifestyle, dialect and terminology, and customs that may no longer be prominent. Oral history can be used academically to trigger independent contextualisation and independent research regarding views expressed by interviewees. Successful oral history enhances its written counterpart.

Other concerns that scholars point to include the fact that the data collected in the form of oral histories is difficult to quantify, can reflect the researchers’ biases towards their object of study, and are open to many interpretations.

In addition, older male speakers from rural communities who have spent their whole life there and who usually did not continue education past age 14 are proportionally overrepresented in some oral history material.

== Transcription ==
Transcribing the data obtained is obviously beneficial and the intentions for future use of transcripts largely determine the way in which the interview will be transcribed. As oral history projects as a rule do not involve the employment of a professional transcriber, "aberrant" characteristics such as dialectal features and superfluous repetitions may be neutralized and eliminated so as to make transcripts more accessible to average readers who are not accustomed to such "aberrations"; that is to say, transcripts may be not completely reflective of the original, actual utterances of the interviewees.

== Controversies ==
In Guatemalan literature, I, Rigoberta Menchú (1983), brings oral history into the written form through the testimonio genre. I, Rigoberta Menchú is compiled by Venezuelan anthropologist Burgos-Debray, based on a series of interviews she conducted with Menchú. The Menchú-controversy arose when historian David Stoll took issue with Menchú's claim that "this is a story of all poor Guatemalans". In Rigoberta Menchú and the Story of All Poor Guatemalans (1999), Stoll argues that the details in Menchú's testimonio are inconsistent with his own fieldwork and interviews he conducted with other Mayas. According to Guatemalan novelist and critic Arturo Arias, this controversy highlights a tension in oral history. On one hand, it presents an opportunity to convert the subaltern subject into a "speaking subject". On the other hand, it challenges the historical profession in certifying the "factuality of her mediated discourse" as "subaltern subjects are forced to [translate across epistemological and linguistic frameworks and] use the discourse of the colonizer to express their subjectivity".

== Organizations ==
- American Folklife Center
- Archives of African American Music and Culture, Indiana University
- Baylor University Institute for Oral History
- Columbia Center for Oral History, Columbia University
- Houston Asian American Archive, Chao Center for Asian Studies, Rice University
- Institut d’histoire du temps présent, French National Centre for Scientific Research
- Louie B. Nunn Center for Oral History, University of Kentucky Libraries
- New York Public Library Community Oral History Projects
- Oral History Centre, National Archives of Singapore
- Post Bellum
- Regional Oral History Office (ROHO), Bancroft Library, University of California, Berkeley
- Samuel Proctor Oral History Program, University of Florida
- Southern Oral History Program, University of North Carolina
- StoryCorps
- Veterans History Project of the Library of Congress American Folklife Center

== Notable oral historians ==
- Svetlana Alexievich
- David P. Boder
- Doug Boyd
- Barry Broadfoot
- Tom Brokaw
- Dave Eggers
- Ophelia Settle Egypt
- Alex Haley
- Oscar Lewis
- Alessandro Portelli
- Elena Poniatowska
- Sang Ye
- Studs Terkel
- Wallace Terry, journalist and author of oral history anthologies featuring African American war veterans and of black journalists.
- Tong Tekong
- T. Harry Williams
- Zhang Xinxin

== Notable oral history projects ==
- Born in Slavery: Slave Narratives from the Federal Writers' Project, 1936 to 1938, Library of Congress. A selection of first-person accounts by formerly enslaved people in the United States.
- Civil Rights History Project, Library of Congress. A collection of interviews with people who participated in the Civil Rights struggle up through and beyond the 1960s.
- Memory of Nations, Post Bellum. A collection of testimonies from people across Europe sharing life under totalitarian regimes in the 20th century.
- Veterans History Project, Library of Congress. A collection of personal accounts by American veterans spanning the First World War, 1914, through the Iraq War, 2011.
- Separated: Stories of Injustice and Solidarity A collection of oral history interviews with parents and children separated by the Trump Administration under Zero Tolerance policy in 2017 and 2018.

== See also ==
- Collective memory
- National Day of Listening
- Oral history preservation
- Oral tradition
