= William W. Moss III =

American archivist (1935–2007)

William W. Moss III (1935 – 2007) was an American archivist and Chinese language specialist.

== Biography ==
=== Life ===
Moss was born in 1935. He attended Haverford College in Haverford, Pennsylvania, and received a Bachelor of Arts degree in 1957. During his time in the United States Navy, he spent a year studying Chinese at the Army Language School in Monterey, California He later attended Columbia University in New York City, and studied Chinese, government, and public law there from 1963 to 1964, receiving a Master of Arts a year later.

He died in 2007, aged 71 or 72.

=== Career ===
Moss joined the United States Navy in 1958, and continued to serve until 1963. In 1964, he began working at the National Security Agency as an Intelligence Research Analyst in foreign language, and held this position until 1969, after which he became an Oral History Interviewer at the John F. Kennedy Library in Boston, Massachusetts. A year later, in 1970, he became the Chief of the Oral History Program. In 1972, he became the library's Senior Archivist for national security and foreign affairs materials, a position he held until 1975, when he was renamed the Chief Archivist. From 1978 to 1979, he served as president of the Oral History Association.

Moss joined the Smithsonian Institution as an archivist and the director of the archives in 1983. He helped establish the Council of Information and Education Directors, of which he was head for two years. He was a chairman for the SI archives and the Special Collections Council for three years. After retiring in 1993, he took up teaching at the Foreign Affairs University in Beijing, China, in the International Programs Office. He was named their first Archivist Emeritus.

== Writings ==
- Moss, William W. “The Future of Oral History.” The Oral History Review 3 (1975): 5–15.
- Moss, William W. “Oral History: An Appreciation.” The American Archivist 40, no. 4 (1977): 429–39.
- Moss, William W. “In Search of Values.” The Oral History Review 7 (1979): 1–5.
- Moss, William W. “Archives in the People’s Republic of China.” The American Archivist 45, no. 4 (1982): 385–409.
- Aiguo, Zhao, Chang Tong, and William W. Moss. “Exquisite Art and Precious Archives: China’s Records in Bronze.” The American Archivist 52, no. 1 (1989): 94–98.
- Moss, William W. “The Archives Law of the People’s Republic of China: A Summary and Commentary.” The American Archivist 54, no. 2 (1991): 216–19.
- Moss, William W. “Dang’an: Contemporary Chinese Archives.” The China Quarterly, no. 145 (1996): 112–29.
- Moss, William W. “Tibetan Archives: A Report from China.” The American Archivist 59, no. 3 (1996): 350–55.
