= Association of Personal Historians =

International non-profit trade association

- Founded: 1995
- Founder: Kitty Axelson-Berry
- Defunct: 2017
- Website: https://www.personalhistorians.org/

The Association of Personal Historians (APH) was an international non-profit trade association dedicated to developing, supporting and marketing the work of self-employed writers and small businesses who are engaged in preparing print, video, and audio memoirs recording the lives of individuals, families, and communities. Formed in the United States in 1995, it had a global membership of over 650 at its peak, before dissolving in May 2017, due to "financial constraints and membership trends".

== Background ==
Kitty Axelson-Berry founded the organization in 1995.

Personal historians record and present clients' memories and biographies in various formats, including books, audio, video, and personal websites. Prices are reported to vary widely, depending on the services offered in each case. The services of personal historians are also used in preparing histories of businesses and other organizations, and by wealth management companies to help improve bonds with their potential clients. Personal historians also provide input to publicly funded oral history projects.

Personal historians have been described as comprising "journalists, psychotherapists, social workers, nurses, videographers, gerontologists, and people from other helping or writing professions", as "retired teachers, journalists, genealogists, and therapists..." and as "social workers, journalists and others involved in communications... retirees who want to embark on a second career." In each case they form "[g]enerally a one-person conglomerate of ghostwriter, editor, and publishing house...".

Personal history work has been reported to be booming in the US, as "a growing cottage industry of amateurs and professionals eager to preserve the experiences of older generations." Paula Stahel, APH President at the time, said in 2008: "We're seeing an increase both in the number of people who want to do personal historian work and an increase in the number of elders who want to be sure their stories are handed down."

All APH members are expected to abide by the organization's code of ethics. Practitioners often have training in skills such as interviewing techniques, desktop publishing, video and/or audio production, as well as some knowledge of geriatrics or other disciplines.

== Governance and dissolution ==
The APH was governed by an elected, all-volunteer board of directors with overlapping two-year terms. The organization held an annual conference for its members.

The 2017 Board of Directors cited decreasing membership and a growing trend towards online networking and collaboration as reasons for dissolution.

== Resources ==
Former members of APH and current personal historians are encouraged to use the phrase "personal history" and "personal historian" in search engines in order to find relevant social media groups. Trade associations exist for genealogists, photo archivists, ghostwriters, editors, and biographers, among others.

== See also ==
- Oral History Association
