= Bunkong Tuon =

American academic

- Born: Bunkong Tuon; Cambodia
- Writing career
- Genre: Poetry

Dr. Bunkong Tuon is a Cambodian-born American poet and educator. He is a Pushcart Prize laureate.

== Early life and education ==
Turon was born several years before the Khmer Rouge takeover in Cambodia and, in 1979, left with his extended family for the Thailand-Cambodia, where he spent several years in refugee camps before immigrating to the U.S. in 1982.

He earned a BA in Comparative Literature from CSULB in 2000, and a MA and a PhD, also in Comparative Literature, from the University of Massachusetts in 2008.

== Career and research ==
His research interests are in the fields of Asian American studies, Southeast Asian American literature and history, trauma studies, testimonial discourse, creative writing, translation theory and practice, and folklore studies.

At Union College, he teaches courses in Asian-American literature and history, Southeast Asian American literature and history, the Vietnam War, ethnic literature, and Kingston & Morrison. His articles on Southeast Asian American authors, the Vietnam War, and translation studies are published in MELUS, Mosaic, Comparative Literature Studies, Children's Literature Association Quarterly, Postcolonial Text, Pedagogy, and Culture, and Poetics. In addition to his scholarship on Southeast Asian-American literature and history, he also publishes fiction, nonfiction, and poetry. His publications include World Literature Today, Copper Nickel, New York Quarterly, Massachusetts Review, The American Journal of Poetry, carte blanche, Diode Poetry, Consequence, among others. He is the author of Gruel, (NYQ Books, 2015), And So I Was Blessed (NYQ Books, 2017), The Doctor Will Fix It (Shabda Press, 2019), and Dead Tongue with Joanna Valente (Yes Poetry, 2020. His debut novel, Koan Khmer, is forthcoming from Curbstone Press/Northwestern UP.

== Awards ==
- 2025, Stillman Prize
- 2024, Pushcart Prize
