= Testimonial literature =

Testimonial literature is autobiographical writing specific to the author that presents a real-life account of trauma, oppression, or survival to bear witness to social injustice. It is a subgenre of trauma literature and the non-fiction novel. While it can be traced to 1970s and 1980s civil conflicts in Latin America, accounts of historical, political, and social incidents of the twentieth century, such as World War I and World War II, have also been written in this format, as was Dr. L. T. Leach's "cancer cure" of 1903. With a dependence on its readers, the genre includes transcribing, editing, and marketing for impact. Works of this genre face questions of authenticity.

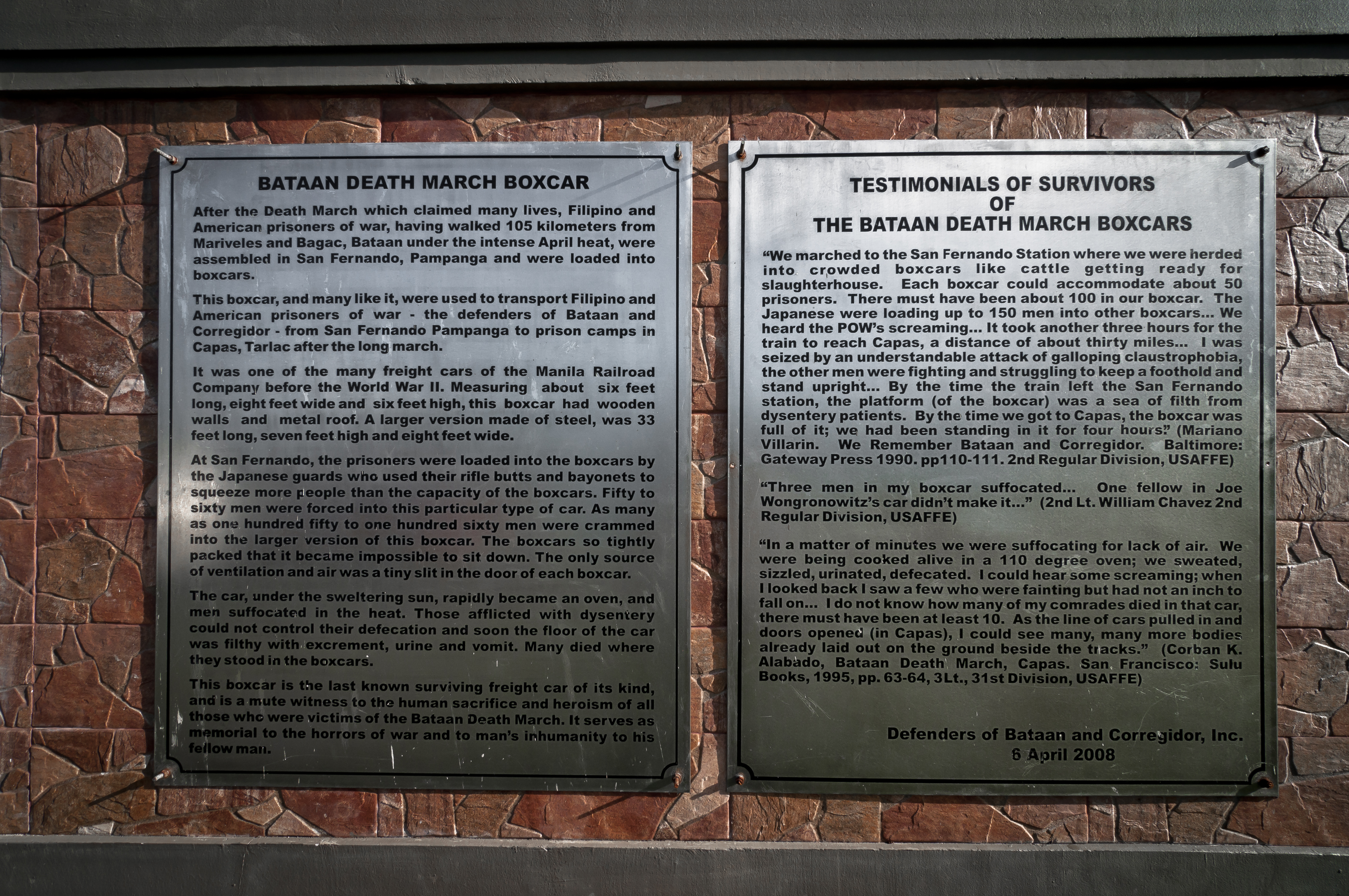
Bataan Death March testimonials

Some published oral or written autobiographical narratives are considered "testimonial literature", particularly when they present evidence or first person accounts of human rights abuses, violence and war, and living under conditions of social oppression. This usage of the term comes originally from Latin America and the Spanish term "testimonio" when it emerged from human rights tribunals, truth commissions, and other international human rights instruments in countries such as Chile and Argentina. One of the most famous, though controversial, of these works to be translated into English is I, Rigoberta Menchú. The autobiographies of Frederick Douglass can be considered among the earliest significant English-language works in this genre. The biographies of marginalized women such as Jesusita Aragon and Maria Elena Lucas, made from recordings and transcriptions by oral historian Fran Leeper Buss, are more recent examples.

== See also ==
- Testimonio
