= Columbia Center for Oral History Research =

Oral history program

Located within Butler Library, the Columbia University Center for Oral History Research is the oldest oral history program. Pulitzer Prize winner Allan Nevins founded the program in 1948. There is an extensive list of projects belonging to the center, both current and completed. Currently the office holds 8,000 taped memoirs and 1,000,000 pages of transcripts.

== Founding ==
Policy was a passion for Allan Nevins, and that inspired him to form the Center for Oral History Research, or more specifically the Columbia University Oral History Research Office. Public policy often has an overload of written information and interview would be helpful in directing research. Nevis requested funding from Columbia University but barely received any—just enough to pay a few employees. The phrase he received from the university was "You'll never receive any operational funding from Columbia" which proved to be false. The center has had four directors, including Nevins, Ronald J. Grele, and Mary Marshall Clark, who is the current director as of June 2001. It wasn't until Clark's time as director that the center gained enough funding to be able to complete extensive projects and partnered with INCITE.

== Organization ==
Columbia Center for Oral History (CCOH) is made up of two complementary centers, the Columbia Center for Oral History Research (CCOHR) and the Columbia Center for Oral History Archives (CCOHA). The archives are housed within Butler Library while the research center is part of Interdisciplinary Center for Innovative Theory and Empirics (INCITE). The research center seeks funding for projects. The results of these projects are sent to the archives to be stored and used as source material for future research. Creating another source of reliable information like this was a goal of founder Allan Nevins.

== Projects ==
Projects put together by the CCOHR are stored in their archives and consist of as much information as can be found on the subject. Some notable examples are below.

=== Current Projects ===
These are the current oral history research projects for Columbia Center for Oral History

- Phoenix House Oral History Project
- Atlantic Philanthropies Oral History Project
  - Has progressed to the second phase of the project which is estimated to last from January 2014 to December 2015
- Institute For Research On Women, Gender, and Sexuality Oral History Project
  - This will place Columbia University and the IRWGS at the forefront of feminist development in an academic setting.
  - It is expected to run November 2013 through October 2015
- The Robert Rauschenberg Oral History Project
  - expected to run June 2013-June 2015

=== Completed Projects ===
==== Apollo Theater Oral History Project ====
This project compiled about 70 hours of narrative discussing the Apollo Theater through the lens of African-American history, the history of music and performance, and the history of New York City. The primary interviewers are Brent Hayes Edwards and Steve Rowland who were assisted by Gustavo Azendha, Karald Kisiedu, and Jennella Young. The funding for this project was provided by the Apollo Theater Foundation who receive their support from Edward and Leslye Phillips Family Foundation, Rockefeller Foundation, and The New York Community Trust.

==== Carnegie Corporation Oral History Project ====
Most recently running from October 2011 to September 2013, the oral history project focusing on the Carnegie Corporation has been a lasting effort. The first of three projects began in 1966 and ran until 1974 compiling 479 hours of interviews which translates into 9948 pages of transcript. The second phase beginning in 1996 gathered 216 hours, 52 of which are video. Most recently, the project has been studying how the organization was run under President Vartan Gregorian, however, this global philanthropy organization will have most of its 100-year history documented by this project.

==== Rule of Law Oral History Project ====
Beginning in 2008 the Rule of Law Oral History Project has studied how the events of 9/11 changed human and civil rights. In 2010 the project expanded and explored the treatment of prisoners in Guantánamo Bay. The project amalgamated 250+ hours of interviews. Atlantic Philanthropies, who helped fund their own oral history project also gave this project necessary funding.

==== September 11, 2001 Oral History Project ====
Because of the massive scope, and the proximity Columbia Center for Oral History has to the attacks on the World Trade Center on September 11, 2001 the oral history project that was inspired has broken into five separate sections. Overall the projects have collected 900 hours of interviews with about 600 individuals. 23 of these hours are on video and 687 are available to the public through the archives.

===== The September 11, 2001 Oral History Narrative and Memory Project =====
This was the first and largest project on 9/11 started by Mary Marshall Clark days after the attacks. She worked with Columbia University history professor Ken Jackson by utilizing his undergraduate class as volunteer interviewers. The project focused on documenting people's reactions before mass media shaped them, as well as reaching many different communities and groups to hear their perspectives. Clark eventually partnered with Peter Bearman, a sociology professor at Columbia University. At this point, still within the same year as the attacks, Columbia became willing to fund operational costs for the center and with the help of Bearman, Clark could apply for grants. Eventually, the project received funding from Rockfeller Foundation, National Science Foundation, New York Times Foundation, and Columbia University. Because of Bearman's involvement, CCOH partnered with ISERP (Institute for Social and Economic Research and Policy). Over the first eight weeks following the attacks, 200 interviews were conducted, and 300 more over the next eight months were completed. 150 of the interviews were from people within 5 blocks of the towers, while 50-60 came from those who were in the towers at the time and survived. After the initial reactions, Clark and her research team focused on reaching as many different groups of people as possible. There was a focus on civil liberty violations by the FBI on immigrants from the Middle East and Muslims. When conducting interviews with Spanish speakers, there was a trend to identify and be traumatized by the sheer number of people who jumped from the towers, which was reported by the Spanish-media but not the mainstream media until much later. This project was identified as "longitudinal" because it strove to cover everyone affected by the attacks and gain the insight of as many points of view as possible. 440 interviews had been conducted in the first year and in 2002 and 2003, 202 of those interviewees had done follow-up interviews as well. In 2005 there was a second wave of interviews, but by this time, the project had already splintered and the other projects had taken off.

===== The September 11, 2001 Response and Recovery Oral History Project =====
This project spanned from 2002 to 2005 and focused on the people in power who had to organize response teams and get the city back on track. 112 hours of interview were conducted with 68 people running government agencies who responded to the attacks, and 12 interviews were conducted with heavily traumatized people who were directly affected by the response and outreach programs the project focused on. The funding for this project came from The New York Times Foundation and the 9/11 Neediest Fund.

===== The September 11, 2001 Public Health Oral History Project =====
After 9/11 there was a lot of fear of anthrax attacks and public health was a top priority, especially in terms of returning to normalcy. This project focused on the people that facilitated that movement, both in government and as part of a not-for-profit organization. 30 hours of interview with 34 people were collected over the course of 11 months from January to November 2002. The New York City Department of Health and Mental Hygiene was heavily involved as were Dr. David Rosner and Dr. Nancy Van Devanter of Columbia University Public Health.

===== The Telling Lives Oral History Project =====
This was the first public oral history program because it was run in public schools as an after school program and worked with the Local 40 Ironworkers. The ironworkers were interviewed to talk about the incident, but this project focused on children both as a means to gain their perspective but also to help these children make sense of what happened as it pertains to them. Both the School for International Studies in Brooklyn and the Dr. Sun Yat Sen Middle School 131 participated. The original funding was provided by the New York Times Foundation and the 9/11 Neediest Fund but it wasn't until the ChevronTexaco Foundation began to fund the project did it become a permanent initiative in 2003. Initially the International School compiled a book of their experiences, and the Chinatown located Dr. Sun Yat Sen school created a museum exhibit for the Museum of Chinese in the Americas. Once ChevronTexaco got involved, and the permanent school program was introduced, classes were required to make either a book or a documentary to be shown publicly.

===== The Chinatown Documentation Project =====
This project was a collaborative project between CCOH, the Museum of Chinese in the Americas, The City University of New York, 9/11 Digital Archives, and New York University's Asian/Pacific/American Studies Program. Rockafeller Foundation funded the program and the goal was to simply document using oral history the effects of 9/11 on Chinatown.
