= National Day of Listening =

American day of observance

The National Day of Listening is an unofficial day of observance where Americans are encouraged to set aside time to record the stories of their families, friends, and local communities. It was launched by the national oral history project StoryCorps in 2008 and now recurs on the Friday after Thanksgiving Day, when families are more likely to spend time together. It was proposed as an alternative to "Black Friday", a day many businesses see as a high volume pre-Christmas sale day.

Tens of thousands of Americans interviewed one another as part of the National Day of Listening in 2008, including President George W. Bush and his wife Laura, who were interviewed by President Bush's sister Dorothy Bush Koch. National Public Radio personalities including Scott Simon, Liane Hansen, Steve Inskeep, Renée Montagne, Frank Deford, Susan Stamberg, and Noah Adams conducted National Day of Listening interviews and broadcast them.

StoryCorps is a national nonprofit organization modeled after the Federal Writers' Project of the Works Progress Administration of the 1930s. In addition to collecting and archiving interviews at the American Folklife Center at the Library of Congress, StoryCorps helps Americans engage with oral histories at the grassroots level.
