= Storyworth =

American storytelling platform

- Type: Private
- Industry: Storytelling; Online publishing
- Founded: 2013; 13 years ago
- Founder: Nick Baum; Krista Baum
- Key people: Nick Baum (CEO); Sushmita Subramanian (Head of Product)
- Products: Printed hardcover books
- Website: www.storyworth.com

Storyworth is an American storytelling platform that sends weekly prompts to subscribers and compiles their responses into a printed book.

== History ==
Storyworth was founded in 2013 by Nick Baum, a San Francisco-based software engineer and product manager who left Google in 2011 to create his own startup, and his wife Krista. The idea grew out of his project, Dear Robot, that texted a daily question and produced a mini diary from the collected replies, and Baum's interest in his father's early life.

== Business model ==
Storyworth is a family-owned business. Subscribers receive one question per week and can reply in writing (on the website or by e-mail), or with an audio recording via phone. The collected stories are compiled into a hardcover book. Users can also compose their own questions and upload their photographs.

In 2022, the annual fee was US$99, and the subscription tied a year of weekly prompts to book production with options to add photos, design the cover, and make edits before printing.

In 2025, Storyworth collaborated with book designer Carol Ly to redesign its printed books and rebuild its photo-layout system. The company also introduced Spanish-language support for its weekly prompts and responses. The following year, the company introduced family newsletter and new voice tools.

As of 2026, the company reported having printed more than one million books and collected around 35 million stories.

== See also ==
- StoryCorps
