= Reyita: The Life of a Black Cuban Woman in the Twentieth Century =

Maria de los Reyes Castillo Bueno (1902–1997), also known as Reyita, is the subject of the testimonial biography Reyita: The Life of a Black Cuban Woman in the Twentieth Century. This orally communicated narrative was rendered into a testimonial biography by Reyita's daughter, Daisy Rubiera Castillo, and published in 1997. Reyita's biography adds a previously unknown and thus, underrepresented perspective to a time of political, as well as social, upheaval and change in Cuban history.

Reyita, in The Life of a Black Cuban Woman in the Twentieth Century, communicates her grandmother's and parents’ oral history of slavery and their fight in the Cuban War of Independence, the last fight for Cuba's independence from Spain and the abolition of slavery in 1898. Although Cuba became an independent republic and freed their African slaves, Reyita notes several Afro-Cuban uprisings during the first half of the 20th century, due to racial discrimination and unequal rights. She mentions personal interactions with leaders of the Partido Independiente de Color (PIC, The Independent Colored Party), Evaristo Estenoz and Pedro Ivonet, who organized an armed protest calling for legalization of the Party. Reyita witnesses the death of the PIC's leaders and thousands of followers, which is called the 1912 PIC massacre. After the massacre of Afro-Cuban leaders and strong groups, Reyita discusses her involvement with, Anti-colonialist Jamaican leader, Marcus Garvey's back-to-Africa movement in the 1920s.

In the 1940s Reyita mentions her community participation with the formation of the Popular Socialist Party, the then name of the Communist Party). She depicts meeting leaders of the Party and discussing their fight for equality between blacks and whites, as well as men and women.

Reyita also mentions her childhood acquaintance Fulgencio Batista who was elected President of the Cuba in 1940–1944 and later staged a coup d'état in 1952 and installed himself as dictator, from which he was overthrown by the Rebel Army and fled to Miami on January 1, 1959.

Reyita not only depicts some of the major social and political events in Cuban history, but also speaks of important cultural elements in Cuba. She talks about famous Cuban musicians and singers, such as Celina and Reutilio, Ignacio Bombú and Benny Moré, to name a few. She reveals aspects of the Santería religion, which has African roots. She mentions her involvement with the literacy campaign after the triumph of the revolution. She speaks of these cultural aspects and aligns them with Cuba's political and social situation at the time.

Overall Reyita's message is her struggle for equality as a poor, black, Cuban woman. Despite all the obstacles produced by racism, sexism and poverty, Reyita stands firm on the belief that integration and social mobility stem not only from the elite, but also from ordinary Afro-Cubans like herself. Reyita exposes a perspective of an Afro-Cuban woman, which had remained silent until the publication of her testimony. Reyita's testimonial biography forms part of Cuba's testimonial literature, a genre that gives voice to the voiceless.
