= Testimonio =

Testimonios are a form of storytelling used by Latin American feminist movements to protest against military governments, authoritarian regimes, and systems of oppression.

== General ==
Testimonio is a Latin American feminist form of resistance against larger oppressive structures like patriarchy that uses a method of rescripting and rewriting history to center previously oppressed voices through women's testimonial literature. Feminists who use testimonios center stories of marginalized people to fight mainstream cultural narratives that hide their stories. Even though testimonios began as a form of countercultural storytelling based on witness accounts, many also blend fictional narratives with historical narratives. Fictionalizing memories allows the authors to make their stories more emotional and powerful, and gives them revolutionary potential.

Testimonios as a practice began as a part of the women's liberation movement in response to growing authoritarianism and military rule in Latin America in the 1970s. Testimonios became a way that women resisted oppressive governments and gave rise to new forms of political protest.

== Etymology ==
The Latin word testimonio derives from Old Northern French testimonie (Old French testimoine, testemoigne) and from Latin testimonium, meaning "evidence, proof, witness, or attestation". It also derives from the Latin word testis, which is "a witness or one who attests". Testis was a word usually regarded as a special application of a "witness" on the notion of what "bears witness to male virility". The suffix -monium signifies action, state, or condition.

== Examples ==
=== The Little School (1986) by Alicia Partnoy ===
Alicia Partnoy's The Little School tells her story as one of "the disappeared" Argentinian prisoners during Argentina's military dictatorship in the late 1970s. Taken to La Escuelita "The Little School", Partnoy endured violence and torture to be "taught a lesson". Being one of the few survivors, she refused to remain silent and shared her experiences into a fictionalized and detailed narrative where she organized her memories into survival tales. Her writing serves as a testimonio of political repression and act of resistance.

=== The Inhabited Woman (1994) by Gioconda Belli ===
Gioconda Belli's The Inhabited Woman fictionalizes the Sandinista struggle against the dictatorship of Anastasio Somoza in Nicaragua. She blends elements of testimonio with survival narratives during the National Liberation Movement (Movimiento). By critiquing both dictatorship and patriarchy, Belli reveals the double marginalization of her protagonist, Lavinia, as a fighter and a woman, while also reflecting her own lived experiences. Through the feminist lens, Belli adds a "feminist dimension to the genre of testimonio" (Smith).

=== Telling to Live: Latina Feminist Testimonios (2001) ===
Telling to Live is a collection of sixty-four testimonios from The Latina Feminist Group, which consists of eighteen Latinas who use their stories to reflect on the complexity of Latina identity, struggle, and resistance. They use testimonios as a feminist method of storytelling to produce knowledge from lived experiences that Latinas may have encountered. This collection expands on how these women have navigated higher education, built relationships, and fought for their place in US society in the late 1990s - early 2000s.
