= Spanish Cuba movement =

Movement advocating Spanish nationality for Cubans and Puerto Ricans

Autonomy for Cuba (Spanish Cuba)
- Autonomía Concertada para Cuba, Inc.
- Abbreviation: ACC
- Nickname: Cuba española
- Named after: Partido Liberal Autonomista
- Formation: 2012
- Founder: Ferrán Núñez
- Founded at: Paris, France
- Type: Non-profit
- Purpose: Activism to restore Spanish citizenship to Cubans and Puerto Ricans
- Headquarters: Miami, Florida, U.S.
- Official language: Spanish
- President: Maikel Arista-Salado y Hernández
- Website: Autonomía Concertada para Cuba, Inc.

Spanish Cuba movement (Spanish: Cuba española) is a contemporary citizens' initiative under the leadership of Maikel Arista-Salado, a Cuban national exiled in the United States, who has successfully filed a lawsuit in Spanish courts that, if successful, will grant Spanish citizenship to 90% of Cubans and Puerto Ricans. The initiative was originally launched in 2008 from an idea of José Ramón Morales (Caimito, Cuba, November 5, 1954–Miami, Florida, May 28, 2012). Morales' original idea was twofold: (1) raise awareness against the dominant historical narrative which was built upon the premise of the Spanish Black Legend, and (2) plead for the re-integration of Cuba to the Kingdom of Spain as an overseas territory upon mutual agreement between Cuba and Spain, followed by a referendum to be approved in both nations.

Upon Morales' death in 2012, the idea was taken up by Cuban writer and historian Ferrán Núñez who published España contra los salvajes: una guerra civil olvidada, providing evidence and historical support for Morales' idea. Núñez' work undermines the conventional narrative taught to and believed by most Cubans today about the origin of the nation as an independent country. Núñez also founded Autonomía Concertada para Cuba as a not-for-profit corporation under the laws of the French Republic, where he legally resides. In 2020 Nuñez chose Maikel Arista-Salado to become the president of the organization. Arista-Salado incorporated a new one under the law of the State of Florida, United States. Under Arista-Salado, ACC has experienced a revival with the successful filing of an action in Spanish courts, seeking judicial review of the 1898 Treaty of Paris. ACC has since dropped its original purpose and redirected to promote Spanish citizenship for all Cubans, with the catchy slogan of "It's time to return home!".

== History ==
José Ramón Morales' blog "Autonomous Community of Cuba, Spain," has received over a million visitors since its inception and has generated bitter controversy in the network. The idea of the reunification of the island of Cuba with Spain is connected with liberal and autonomist ideas that coexisted throughout the nineteenth century with the ideal of independence.

The entry of the United States in the Spanish–American War and its support for separatist Spaniards, changed the destiny of the island, which in 1898 came under American influence.

Current historical research tints Manichean positions developed by Marxist doctrine in Cuba, aimed to prove the inevitability of the revolutionary movement that started in 1868 with the Grito de Yara, and concluded a hundred years later with the power grab by Fidel Castro. Morales, a Cuban exile in Miami and a blogger, advocated for Cuba's autonomy under Spanish governance rather than independence. He contrasts this with annexation, emphasizing the rights and unity this status would afford Cubans within the broader context of the European Union. Despite facing threats for his opinions, Morales remained committed to his vision of a democratic Cuba integrated with Spain, seeing this as a means to ensure stability and prosperity.

After the death of José Ramón Morales, the movement was taken up by a non-profit association called Autonomie Concertée de Cuba (ACC) led by Ferrán Núñez a Cuban exiled residing in France. Also known as Cuban autonomous community movement (Spanish: Movimiento por la Reincorporación de Cuba a España como Comunidad Autónoma) the movement advocates Cuba becoming the 18th autonomous community of Spain.

In 2020, after eight years building Spanish Cuba movement Ferrán Núñez stepped down as president of ACC, and chose Maikel Arista-Salado, an American citizen of Cuban origin to continue the work he had started almost a decade earlier. Under Arista-Salado's leadership, ACC shifted its focus, formally abandoning all claims of annexing Cuba to Spain. Instead, the organization is now concentrating on resolving the issue of the denaturalization of birthright Spanish citizens as outlined in Article IX of the Treaty of Paris. The aforementioned article provided the following:

Article IX

Spanish subjects, natives of the Peninsula, residing in the territory over which Spain by the present treaty relinquishes or cedes her sovereignty, may remain in such territory or may remove therefrom, retaining in either event all their rights of property, including the right to sell or dispose of such property or of its proceeds; and they shall also have the right to carry on their industry, commerce and professions, being subject in respect thereof to such laws as are applicable to other foreigners. In case they remain in the territory they may preserve their allegiance to the Crown of Spain by making, before a court of record, within a year from the date of the exchange of ratifications of this treaty, a declaration of their decision to preserve such allegiance; in default of which declaration they shall be held to have renounced it and to have adopted the nationality of the territory in which they may reside.

The civil rights and political status of the native inhabitants of the territories hereby ceded to the United States shall be determined by the Congress.

== Historical and legal context ==
According to Maikel Arista-Salado, the restoration of Spanish citizenship to native citizens of Cuba and Puerto Rico, dispossessed of their former naturalization under Article IX of the Treaty of Peace between the United States of America and the Kingdom of Spain (1898), is a legitimate claim of current descendants of Spaniards living abroad has never been addressed by any Spanish government, or the Spanish Parliament. It had virtually a non-issue up until recently when the legal initiative of Maikel Arista-Salado's challenging the validity of this article has spurred considerable attention by the media and commentators, primarily because for the first time in 125 years a lawsuit has been filed which could potentially force the European Court of Human Rights to weigh in the merits of this case and can settle this old claim of Spanish citizens who, at the turn of the 20th century were neglected.

The new provisions for the acquisition of Spanish citizenship to Iberian Jews and the Historical Memory and Democratic Memory laws, both adopted by Socialist governments of José Luis Rodríguez Zapatero in 2007 and Pedro Sánchez in 2022, only include provisions for the recognition of Spanish nationality to current descendants of Spaniards who went into exile after the Cuban Revolution (1959). However, no mention is made of those Spanish citizens born in Cuba and Puerto Rico before April 11, 1898, who were forcefully denaturalized.

On February 7, 2014, the then-current Spanish government (Gallardón, Margallo, Rajoy; PP) announced a controversial bill providing for the recognition of Spanish nationality for the descendants of the Iberian Jews expelled from the Kingdoms of Spain and Portugal in 1492 following the Alhambra Decree by the Catholic Monarchs Isabella of Castile and Ferdinand II of Aragon. Thus, it opened a legal way for Spanish descendants in former overseas territories to request Spanish citizenship as well, because they too were deprived illegally of their citizenship.

== Legal challenges: a petition/lawsuit to repeal Article IX ==
The efforts to repeal Article IX of the Treaty of Peace between the United States of America and the Kingdom of Spain (1898) are centered around addressing the historical consequences of this legal document, particularly concerning the nationality status of Cubans and Puerto Ricans. Article IX of the Treaty of Paris dealt with the civil rights and political status of the native inhabitants of territories ceded by Spain to the United States after the end of the Spanish–American War, which included Cuba, Puerto Rico, the Philippines, and Guam. Beyond legal aspects, this issue touches on cultural identity and historical recognition. It is a matter of acknowledging a shared history and potentially correcting a historical oversight. Such efforts can also influence international relations, particularly between Spain, the United States, Cuba, and Puerto Rico.

On October 7, 2022, Maikel Arista-Salado, a U.S. citizen of Cuban origin, filed a petition with the Consulate-General of Spain in Miami, Florida. Under Spanish law, petitions filed with any governmental office pursuant to the Spanish Petition Act (Ley Orgánica 4/2001, de 12 de noviembre, reguladora del derecho de petición) are a constitutionally protected right (recognized in article 29 of the Spanish Constitution). In it, Arista-Salado petitions the Spanish government to denounce Article IX or declare it null as it violates the 1876 Spanish Constitution, which was in full force in Cuba and Puerto Rico at the time when the Treaty of Paris was signed (1898), as it violates the current Spanish Constitution, European Union law, U.S. federal law, and international law. The document goes on to request the Spanish government to restore Spanish citizenship to all the descendants of those Spanish citizens native to Cuba and Puerto Rico who were forcefully denaturalized. This petition challenges the validity of Article IX of the Treaty, because it did not allow Spanish citizens born in its overseas possessions of Cuba and Puerto Rico to exercise the right to choose their allegiance, thereby stripping them of their birthright nationality.

Arista-Salado presents several arguments to justify the initiative:

1. The continuous application of Article IX of the Treaty of Paris (1898) has caused significant injustice by forcing the Kingdom of Spain to forcefully denaturalize its citizens in Cuba and Puerto Rico.
2. Cuba and Puerto Rico were full Spanish territories under the 1876 Spanish Constitution, and their native citizens should be considered Spanish by birth.
3. The mass denaturalization of their citizens was unconstitutional, null, and invalid as Spain lacked the legal capacity to withdraw citizenship from its own nationals.
4. The mass denaturalization, even if legal, was contrary to the law as it lacked due process and proper notification.
5. The act of denaturalization did not affect the transmission of their right to citizenship by descent (ius sanguinis).
6. The mass denaturalization was never transcribed into the Spanish civil registry, rendering it legally unverifiable; also, no treaty can legally bind no Spanish citizen to.

If the petition is successful, Spain would be obliged to grant nationality to a sizeable portion of the current Cuban population, excluding descendants of Cubans who arrived on the island after 1899. Arista-Salado argues that the treaty affected the inhabitants of these territories at the time of its signing. He believes there are claims that Cubans and Puerto Ricans should pursue regarding the restitution of Spanish citizenship. His organization, Autonomía Concertada para Cuba, Inc. (Cuba española) supports this initiative. Arista-Salado emphasizes that the treaty has not been challenged in court for over 125 years, and he believes that modern legal mechanisms could facilitate such a challenge now. He points out that Article IX of the treaty deprived Spanish citizens, who had been peacefully and continuously in possession of their citizenship for four centuries, of their birthright nationality. This, according to Arista, undermines the territorial integrity of Spain, as Cuba and Puerto Rico were not merely colonies but territories with full rights and with the added privilege of home-rule and legal personality granted by the Spanish government in 1897, in fact they were the first ones to be granted in the entire kingdom. In summary, while the Treaty of Paris did not directly strip Spanish citizenship from the inhabitants of Cuba and Puerto Rico, its provisions set in motion a series of events and legal changes that ultimately altered the citizenship status of people in these territories.

The administrative petition was denied by executive order of the Foreign Secretary (Ministro de Relaciones Exteriores, Unión Europea y Cooperación), issued February 23, 2023, (File n.º V.37/2023, Document 2.8-9, pages 48–52) and notified to Arista-Salado on March 30 (Doc. 2.11-12, pages 63–65). The Spanish government's position through its Foreign Office is that under the Vienna Convention on the Law of Treaties, Article IX cannot be denounced on the grounds of (1) public policy and that (2) the Treaty contains no provisions allowing for the denunciation. Regarding the first proposition, the Spanish government argues that an alleged denunciation of Article IX would be seen as an unfriendly behavior by the United States thus affecting its diplomatic relations, considered of great priority to Spain. As far as the lack of denunciation provisions in the treaty, the Spanish government conveniently forgets that under the same Vienna Convention on the Law of Treaties violations of ius cogens are sufficient basis for denunciation. The denial was challenged by Arista-Salado who filed suit in Spanish court. In the complaint, pending in the Audiencia Nacional, Arista-Salado petitions the court: (1) to declare the Foreign Secretary's order null and void. Arista-Salado, now Plaintiff, argues that the Foreign Secretary has no authority to grant the petition, let alone to deny it, as it involves a constitutional question; alternatively, (2) to ask the Constitutional Court to determine if art. IX is compatible with the Constitution through a constitutional question action, and to ask the Court of Justice of the European Union if art. IX is compatible with European Law through a prejudicial question; alternatively, (3) to redress the issue to the Spanish government who has the authority to denounce the Treaty. As of April 1, 2014, the court issued an interim order declaring the case at issue.

== Citizenship revocation legal standard analysis ==
Whether a state possesses the legal competence to regulate matters of nationality—including a state like Spain—depends on the framework being analyzed: international law, constitutional law, or domestic legislation.

1. International Law

Under international law, states enjoy broad discretion to determine the rules governing acquisition and loss of nationality. This sovereignty is tempered by obligations aimed at preventing statelessness. The 1961 Convention on the Reduction of Statelessness, for example, binds signatory states to adopt nationality laws that avoid rendering individuals stateless, particularly through arbitrary deprivation of citizenship.

2. Spanish Constitutional and Domestic Law

Spain's constitutional and statutory framework outlines the legal basis for acquiring, retaining, and losing Spanish nationality. The Código Civil, as interpreted under the Constitution, allows for both automatic loss (e.g., voluntary acquisition of another nationality without declaration of intent to retain Spanish citizenship) and deprivation under limited circumstances (e.g., fraudulent acquisition). However, such measures are subject to legal safeguards. Critically, Spanish law protects against statelessness and prohibits the revocation of nationality from citizens by birth, reflecting an important substantive and symbolic threshold.

3. Historical Context – Treaty of Paris (1898)

Historically, the legal principles governing nationality have evolved, but the Treaty of Paris (1898) offers a critical precedent. The treaty imposed a mass denaturalization on Spanish subjects in ceded territories—such as Cuba—without individual consent or procedural guarantees. Though it occurred under the guise of state sovereignty, this act challenges modern legal standards and raises questions about retroactive justice, continuity of nationality, and the protection of acquired rights. Today, its legacy must be interpreted through a modern lens that integrates international legal norms and evolving human rights doctrines.

4. Human Rights Considerations

Modern human rights law reinforces the notion that nationality is not merely a matter of state discretion but a fundamental right. Instruments such as the Universal Declaration of Human Rights (Article 15) and various regional treaties condemn arbitrary deprivation of nationality and reinforce protections against statelessness. Any state action that effectively strips a person of citizenship—especially when it results in statelessness—is increasingly subject to international scrutiny and potential legal challenge.

While Spain, like any sovereign state, holds the formal authority to legislate on nationality, this power is neither absolute nor unconstrained. It is bounded by international obligations, constitutional principles, and evolving human rights norms. The historical context of treaties like that of Paris (1898) underscores how geopolitical circumstances can override individual rights—something international law now seeks to limit. The interpretation and application of citizenship laws must, therefore, balance sovereign prerogatives with individual rights and legal continuity.

== See also ==
- Caribbean Community (CARICOM)
- Caribbean South America
- Cuba–Spain relations
- Decolonization of the Americas
  - Special Committee on Decolonization
- History of Cuba
  - Criollo people
  - Hispanidad
  - Spanish American wars of independence
  - Spanish colonization of the Americas
  - Viceroyalty of New Spain
- Independence movement in Puerto Rico
  - Latin American and Caribbean Congress in Solidarity with Puerto Rico's Independence
- Inter-American Development Bank
- List of active separatist movements in North America
