= Oral History Association =

Organization based in US

- Abbreviation: OHA
- Formation: 1966
- Type: Non-profit
- Executive Director: Stephen Sloan
- Website: Oral History Association

The Oral History Association (OHA) is a professional association for oral historians and others interested in advancing the practice and use of oral history. It is based in the United States but has international membership. Its mission is that they are "a dynamic crossroads of ideas and people, connecting and inspiring practitioners, and supporting their work to ethically collect, preserve, share, and interpret memories which foster knowledge and respect."

== History ==
In 1966 James V. Mink, director of the UCLA Oral History Program, planned and staged the First National Colloquium on Oral History, which was held in California, at the Lake Arrowhead Conference Center, on 25–28 September. Panelists at the meeting included Louis M. Starr, director of the Columbia University oral history program; Elizabeth Mason, associate director of the Columbia University oral history program; Allan Nevins, writer and historian; Samuel Hand, history professor at the University of Vermont; and Saul Benison, writer and history professor at Brandeis University. The founding of an oral history association was first discussed at this meeting, and James Mink served as the Chairman of the new association from 1967 to 1968.

In its first newsletter, in June 1967, the association announced that it had been incorporated as a registered non-profit educational organization in New York State.

In 1968 Louis Starr organized the Second National Colloquium on Oral History which was held at Arden House in Harriman, New York. Starr served as the Oral History Association's first president.

In 2017 the association established its headquarters at Middle Tennessee State University for a term of at least five years. In October 2022 it was announced that in January 2023 the association would move its headquarters to the Institute for Oral History at Baylor University, in Waco, Texas.

== Leadership ==
OHA Executive Office

Stephen Sloan, Executive Director

Steven Sielaff, Assistant Director

Hailey Rowe, Program Associate

OHA Officers and Council Members

President

Tomas F. Summers Sandoval, Jr., Pomona College

Vice-President/President-Elect

Kelly Elaine Navies, Smithsonian, National Museum of African American History and Culture

First Vice President

Troy Reeves, University of Wisconsin-Madison

Past President

Amy Starecheski, Columbia University

Council

Cynthia Tobar (2020–2023), Bronx Community College

Zaheer Ali (2021–2024), The Lawrenceville School

Alissa Rae Funderburk (2021–2024), Jackson State University

Nishani Frazier (2022–2025), University of Kansas

Shanna Farrell (2022–2025), University of California

Treasurer

Mary Larson, Oklahoma State University

== Activities ==
OHA holds an annual meeting that focuses on different oral history topics, hosts a Wiki for sharing resources, and hosts an online OHA Network for finding other members with similar interests.

OHA gives out the following awards:

- Emerging Crises Research Annual Fund
- Stetson Kennedy Vox Populi ("Voice of the People") Annual Award
- Book Award (biennial)
- Oral History in Nonprint Format (biennial)
- Martha Ross Teaching Award (biennial)
- Article Award (biennial)
- Postsecondary Teaching Award (biennial)
- Elizabeth B. Mason Project Award (biennial)

OHA encourages its members to participate in its thirteen committees:

- Advocacy Committee
- Committee on Committees
- Development Committee
- Diversity Committee
- Education Committee
- Emerging Professionals Committee
- Finance Committee
- International Committee
- Membership Committee
- Nomination Committee
- Public Programming Committee
- Publications Committee
- Scholarship Committee

== Publications ==
The Oral History Review is the official publication of OHA and was first issued in 1973. Its founding editor was Samuel Hand. Released annually from 1973 - 1986, it is now released biannually by Oxford Journals.

Newsletters are released in the spring, fall, and winter each year. A Pamphlet Series provides information about topics such as oral history in the classroom and oral history for the family historian.

== Affiliates ==
- International Oral History Association
- Michigan Oral History Association
- Midwest Oral History Group
- New England Association for Oral History
- Northwest Oral History Association
- OHMAR – Oral History Mid-Atlantic Region
- Southwest Oral History Association
- Texas Oral History Association

== See also ==
- Association of Personal Historians
