= Fran Leeper Buss =

American historian (1942–2022)

Fran Leeper Buss

Fran Leeper Buss (born Frances Barker; March 1942 – July 2022) was an American oral historian, ordained minister, author, teacher, social worker, photographer, and feminist.

== Early years and education ==
Fran Leeper Buss was born in Manchester, Iowa, in 1942. Her mother was Wilma Irene Barker, a clerk in a sewing department. Her father, Clyde Francis "Frank" Barker, was a radio engineer. Her childhood was mostly spent in Dubuque. She earned a teaching degree from the University of Iowa in 1964, a Master of Divinity from the Iliff School of Theology in Denver, Colorado, and a Ph.D. in 20th-century American history from the University of Arizona in 1995.

== Career and publications ==
In 1971, Buss was the co-founder of the Women's Crisis and Information Center in Fort Collins, Colorado. She and her second husband, David Buss, served as ministers in the Campus/Community Ministry in Las Vegas, New Mexico. In 1976, Buss was ordained. She also taught women's studies at the University of Wisconsin–Whitewater, and the University of Arizona. Over four decades, Buss collected the stories of marginalized women in the USA. While living in Las Vegas, Buss interviewed Jesusita Aragon, a traditionally trained midwife. In 1980, Buss published Aragon's life story as La Partera: Story of a Midwife with The University of Michigan Press. Buss moved to Wisconsin in 1976, where she continued her oral history work by traveling across the country to conduct interviews, using a reel-to-reel tape recorder, a secondhand camera, and a car. This eventually led to the publication of Dignity: Lower Income Women Tell of Their Lives and Struggles: Oral Histories (1985).

Buss also worked and became long-term friends with Maria Elena Lucas, a migrant Chicana farm worker activist, and Mary Robinson, a textile union activist. Based on the transcripts of interviews with these two women, Buss published Forged under the Sun / Forjada bajo el sol: The Life of Maria Elena Lucas (1993) and Moisture of the Earth: Mary Robinson, Civil Rights and Textile Union Activist (2009).

After retiring from teaching, Buss analyzed her oral histories of poor and working-class women and published Memory, Meaning, and Resistance: Reflecting on Oral History and Women at the Margins (2017).

The original transcripts of Buss's oral history interviews are housed at Harvard University at the Arthur and Elizabeth Schlesinger Library of the History of Women in America along with notebooks on her techniques as an oral historian and her journals. A collage of her photographs can be viewed on her website.

In 1991, Buss published a novel for young adults, called Journey of the Sparrows with Puffin Books. It has been translated into six languages, including Norwegian and adapted into a play. The novel depicts the lives of illegal Latin American migrants to the United States of America. The book won the Jane Addams Children's Book Award in 1992.

== Personal life ==
Buss had three children from an early marriage to fellow student Dennis Leeper. After the marriage ended in divorce, Buss took several jobs but still ended up nearly homeless and had to go on welfare. This led to her lifelong interest in economic justice and the status of women. Following a medical procedure that left her in chronic pain, she later cited the experience as a factor in her focus on economic and health advocacy for marginalized women. Buss died in July 2022.

== Awards ==
- The first annual Catherine Prelinger Prize for Outstanding Contributions in the Field of Women's History in 1998.
- American Library Association (ALA) 2018 Choice, Outstanding Academic Title.
