= StoryCorps =

U.S. non-profit organisation

- Founded: 2003; 23 years ago
- Founder: David Isay
- Tax ID no.: 13-3753011
- Legal status: Active
- Location: Brooklyn, New York City, New York, U.S.
- Official language: English
- Website: storycorps.org

StoryCorps is an American non-profit organization that records, preserves, and shares interviews with Americans from a range of backgrounds. It grew out of Sound Portraits Productions and was founded in 2003 by radio producer David Isay. Its headquarters are in the Fort Greene neighborhood of Brooklyn, New York.

Isay cited the oral historian Studs Terkel, whose career began with the Works Progress Administration (WPA) oral history projects of the 1930s, as an inspiration. Terkel cut the ribbon at the opening of StoryCorps' first recording booth in Grand Central Terminal in October 2003. As of 2023, StoryCorps had recorded interviews with more than 645,000 participants in all 50 states, Washington, D.C., and several U.S. territories. Edited excerpts air on NPR's Morning Edition; the project received a Peabody Award in 2007 and has been criticized by oral historians for its interview format.

== Recording methods ==
=== StoryBooth ===
Participants can visit StoryBooths, which are small, publicly accessible recording studios located in public places. The first StoryBooth opened in New York City's Grand Central Terminal on October 23, 2003, and was moved to Lower Manhattan's Foley Square in July 2005. The second StoryBooth opened at the Contemporary Jewish Museum in San Francisco in October 2008.. The third StoryBooth opened at Atlanta's public radio station WABE in October 2009. In 2013, StoryCorps opened a fourth StoryBooth at the Chicago Cultural Center. As of 2022 the Atlanta StoryBooth is one of only a few fully operational.

=== MobileBooth ===
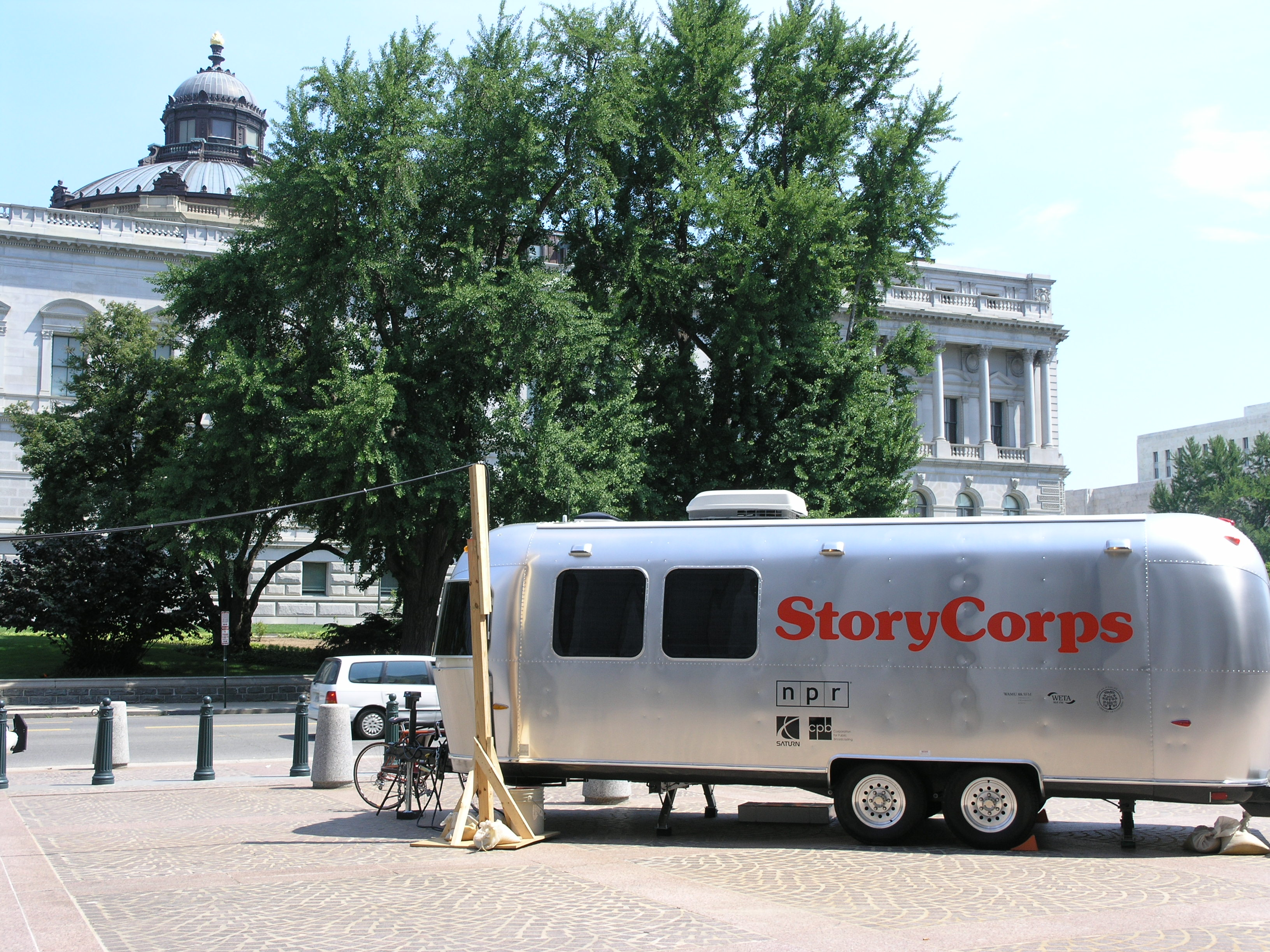
A StoryCorps MobileBooth parked at the Library of Congress

In May 2005, two StoryCorps MobileBooths built from converted Airstream trailers began traveling the country, recording stories in various cities year-round.

== Initiatives ==
- The Great Thanksgiving Listen encourages people of all ages to create an oral history of our times by recording an interview with an elder, mentor, friend, or someone they admire.
- One Small Step, piloted in 2018, is an initiative that brings people with different political views together to record a 50-minute conversation about their lives, not politics, and to get to know each other as human beings.

== Criticism ==
StoryCorps has been criticized on multiple fronts. While it has been called "an oral history of America", one group of oral historians have critiqued the project's methodology, specifically the "highly sculpted techniques of the interviews", such as the pre-scripted questions, the 40-minute time limit, and the presence of a StoryCorps staff member in the recording booth. The result of the technique is that interviews often elicit "an often-rehearsed moment, story, or memory". The oral historians conclude that "the StoryCorps interview is a formula for creating an enduring nugget that can be passed from listener to listener, moving each recipient to give it meaning."

Historians are also critical of the post-interview editing process, which they argue favor highly emotional and predictable narrative arcs. StoryCorps stories typically feature tales of survival, which, as one historian has argued, perpetuates an "interpretive straightjacket of the neoliberal belief that people have their fates in their own hands."

StoryCorps has also been criticized for how its stories are framed on Morning Edition. For example, in a 2016 story, an elderly man confessed to having stolen $2 from his home that had been left for Pearl, his family's domestic servant. When Pearl insisted that she had not been paid that week, she was fired. The title NPR gave the story—"A Lifelong Secret: Can You Help This Ailing 94-Year-Old Man Make Amends?"—as well as Steve Inskeep's closing request for listeners to help find Pearl, drew ire from listeners who found the sympathetic portrayal of the man to be misguided and offensive.

== Awards ==
In 2007, StoryCorps was awarded a rare institutional award at the 66th Annual Peabody Awards. It won another Peabody Award in 2011 for StoryCorps' 9/11 Initiative.

In 2015, Dave Isay won the 2015 TED prize to fulfill his wish for people to have meaningful conversations worldwide using the StoryCorps app.

== See also ==
- David Isay
- National Day of Listening
- Storyworth
