= María Elena Lucas =

Chicana activist (born 1941)

María Elena Lucas (born March 22, 1941) is a Chicana migrant farm worker, labor rights activist, poet, diarist, storyteller and playwright. She founded the United Farm Workers' Service Center in the North American Midwest, organizing day care, a health clinic and other services. She was vice president of the Farm Labor Organizing Committee (FLOC). Her activism was curtailed when she and her oldest son were poisoned by pesticides.

== Early life ==
Lucas was born on March 22, 1941, in Brownsville, Texas, the oldest of seventeen children. Her father, a radio operator in World War II, survived the bombing of Pearl Harbor. Her mother, Celia, became a certified midwife. The family was impoverished, the children scavenging, shrimping, and street selling from a very early age to help feed the family. The oldest children were also kept busy with household chores and looking after the younger children. In the summer, the family would travel north as migrant agricultural workers to work harvesting sugar beet and potatoes. Travelling in run-down cars, being moved on from public parks, drinking dirty water from ditches, bitten by ants and mosquitos as they slept rough, the journey was hard. Working away from home, the family lived and worked in the fields, in unsanitary conditions, performing stoop labor in searing temperatures, and always worrying about food, money and health. Lucas, still a child, witnessed the illness, starvation and death of migrant farm workers.

Working in the fields both around Brownsville and further away in the summers, plus being pulled out of school altogether at age 12 to work, meant that Lucas received a maximum of three years of schooling altogether. She learned English and Spanish from her grandparents. She wrote poems, songs and diary entries from an early age however, often having to hide them from her relatives.

Lucas married Texas-born Andres on December 30, 1956, when she was fifteen, as a way of escaping her father's beatings. Unfortunately, her husband was also violent and his family treated her severely and as a maid. Without access to birth control, Lucas had seven children and several miscarriages, the pregnancies coming at a rate of about one a year. Eventually, after her husband beat her badly, she decided to leave him and took her seven children with her to the Midwest to live and work.

== Career as an organizer ==
From 1975 onwards, Lucas started organizing fellow migrant farmworkers, first forming a Mexican folk ballet, then boycotting a local grocery store. Her troupe, El Teatro Campesino, was invited to perform by other organizations to raise awareness of Mexican culture, of the plight of migrant farm workers and to raise money for the United Farm Workers which Lucas then joined. Lucas started the first Farm Worker Service Centre in the Midwest and wrote plays about the hardships of the field workers which were acted out by the field workers themselves. She was also involved in a successful campaign against the Campbell's. In 1983, she resigned from the service center. In 1985, she trained under Cesar Chavez to be an organizer for the Farm Labor Organizing Committee (FLOC) in Onarga, Illinois. Although committed to her work in FLOC, she was keenly aware of the gender discrimination within the organization.

Back in Texas, in 1988 Lucas and her son were sprayed with agricultural pesticides from a crop dusting plane while driving along a large public highway. They both became severely ill. The effects of the poisoning, including pain and loss of balance, have lasted for years, making it difficult for Lucas to make a living by visiting the fields and camps to sign farm workers up to the union. In 1990, Lucas and her son both received small out of court settlements against the pilot of the crop duster plane.

Lucas was interviewed over eleven years by historian Fran Leeper Buss and the transcripts formed the basis of the 1993 book Forged Under the Sun/Forjada Bajo El Sol: The Life of María Elena Lucas, published by the University of Michigan Press. It is in the genre of testimonios, first person accounts by people who have suffered oppression and marginalization. The original transcripts of the interviews plus notes on the oral history techniques used are archived at Harvard University at the Arthur and Elizabeth Schlesinger Library of the History of American Women. Lucas has been invited to speak at universities about her experiences since the book was published and has been cited in journal articles and her book reviewed by, for example, Barbara Kingsolver.
