= David P. Boder =

- Born: Aron Mendel Michelson; 9 November 1886; Liepāja, Latvia
- Died: 18 December 1961 (aged 75); Los Angeles, California, U.S.
- Occupation: Psychology professor
- Spouses: Pauline Ivianski (m. 1907; div. 1909) Nadejda Chernik (m. 1917; died 1919) Dora Neveloff (m. 1925)
- Children: Elena
- Parent(s): Berl Michelson and Betti Michelson

David Pablo Boder (9 November 1886 – 18 December 1961) was a Latvian-American professor of psychology at the Illinois Institute of Technology who traveled in 1946 to Europe to record interviews with Holocaust survivors. During that trip, he collected over a hundred interviews totaling 120 hours on a wire recorder developed by fellow professor Dr Marvin Camras. He was the first to record the experiences of the survivors and is a highly noted primary source reference.

== Family and career ==
Boder was born Aron Mendel Michelson to Berl and Betti (Frank) Michelson, a Jewish family living in Liepāja, Latvia. The large Jewish community residing in Liepāja at that time likely allowed Boder to grow up speaking Yiddish and German, reserving Russian for speaking at school. At around age 19, Boder began studying psychology, first in Leipzig and then St. Petersburg. While living in St. Petersburg, Boder married Pauline Ivianski in 1907, who gave birth to their daughter Elena later that year. They divorced in 1909.

In 1919, Boder, his second wife Nadejda, and his daughter moved to Mexico, fleeing the Russian Civil War. Nadejda died in the 1918 flu pandemic soon after their arrival. In Mexico, Boder learned to speak Spanish, taught psychology at the National University, and married his third wife Dora in 1925 with whom he moved to the United States soon after. Upon moving to the U.S., Boder obtained degrees from the University of Chicago and Northwestern University, while also working at the Lewis Institute (which became Illinois Institute of Technology).

== European Displaced Persons Project ==
Upon the end of World War II, Boder conceived of a project for interviewing displaced persons of the war, to preserve their stories and investigate the psychological effects of war. In July 1946, Boder arrived in Paris and spent the next nine weeks conducting 130 interviews in 16 locations across France, Germany, Switzerland and Italy. By this time, Boder spoke over seven languages, allowing him to conduct interviews in the subjects' native tongue. Most of the subjects were Eastern European Jews, primarily from Poland, but Boder also spoke with Western European Jews, non-observant German Jews, Greek Jews and non-Jews.

In October 1946, Boder returned to the U.S. and began transcribing the interviews and working on a book manuscript, supported by a grant from the National Institute of Mental Health. In 1949, a collection of eight transcribed interviews and Boder's analysis was published under the title I Did Not Interview the Dead, though this book sold poorly and went out of print. Boder would continue to work on transcribing the interviews until 1956, when his funding from the National Institute of Mental Health ran out.

== Later life ==
In 1951, Boder interviewed persons displaced by a large flood in Kansas City. In 1952, Boder retired from the Illinois Institute of Technology and relocated with his wife to UCLA as an unpaid research associate. Boder died of a heart attack on December 18, 1961 at age 75.
