= International Oral History Association =

Association of oral historians

The International Oral History Association (IOHA) is a professional association established to provide a forum for oral historians around the world. IOHA was formally constituted in June 1996 at the IXth International Oral History Conference in Gothenburg, Sweden. It holds international meetings biennially and publishes a newsletter and journal, Words and Silences/Palabras y Silen, in English and Spanish.

In 2019, the book Giving a voice to the Oppressed? The International Oral History Association as an academic network and political movement edited by Agnès Arp, Annette Leo and Franka Maubach was published, tracing the early history of IOHA.

== IOHA Presidents & Vice-Presidents ==
- Mercedes Vilanova (Spain), 1996–2000; Vice-Presidents Marieta de Moraes Ferreira (Brazil), Alistair Thomson (UK / Australia)
- Marieta de Moraes Ferreira (Brazil), 2000–2002; Vice-Presidents Janis Wilton (Australia), Gunhan Danisman (Turquía)
- Janis Wilton (Australia), 2002–2004; Vice-Presidents Rina Benmayor (Estados Unidos), Gerardo Necoechea (México)
- Rina Benmayor (USA), 2004–2006; Vice-Presidents Funso Afolayan (Nigeria), Gerardo Necoechea (México)
- Al Thomson (UK / Australia), 2006–2008; Vice-Presidents Pilar Domínguez (Spain), Alexander von Plato (Germany)
- Pilar Domínguez (Spain), 2008–2010; Vice-Presidents Antonio Montenegro (Brazil), Sean Field (South Africa)
- Miroslav Vanek (Czech Republic), 2010–2012; Vice-Presidents Juan Gutiérrez (México/Estados Unidos), Miren Llona (Spain)
- Anna Maria De La O (Mexico), 2012–2014; Vice-Presidents Andrea Casa Nova Maia (Brazil), Helen Klaebe (Australia)
- Indira Chowdhury (India), 2014–2016; Vice-Presidents David Beorlegui (Spain), Mark A. Cave (USA)
- Mark A. Cave (USA), 2016–2018; Vice-Presidents Avehi Menon (India), David Beorlegui (Spain)
- Sue Anderson (Australia), 2018–2021; Vice-Presidents Mark Wong (Singapore), Outi Fingerroos (Finland)
- David Beorlegui (Spain), 2021-2023; Vice-Presidents Mark Wong (Singapore), Martha Norkunas (USA)
- David Beorlegui (Spain), 2023-2025; Vice-Presidents Tian Miao (China), Leslie McCartney (USA)
- Mark Wong (Singapore), 2025 - 2028, Vice-Presidents Tian Miao (China), Jakub Gałęziowski (Poland)

== International Oral History Conferences ==
Conference No.	Location	Dates	Theme
I	Bologna, Italy	1976	Tra storia e antropologia / Between Anthropology and History
II	Colchester, England	1978	International European Conference in Oral History
III	Amsterdam, Netherlands	1980	International Oral History Conference
IV	Aix-en-Provence, France	1982	Colloque international d'histoire orale
V	Barcelona, Spain	1985	El poder a la societat / El poder en la Sociedad
VI	Oxford, England	1987	Myth and History
VII	Essen, Germany	1990	Gedächtnis und sozialer Wandel
VIII	Siena, Italy	1993	Memory and Multiculturalism / Memoria emulticulturalismo
IX*	Gothenburg, Sweden	13–16 Jun 1996	Communicating Experience
X	Rio de Janeiro, Brazil	14–18 Jun 1998	Oral History: Challenges for the 21st Century
XI	Istanbul, Turkey	15–19 Jun 2000	Crossroads of History: Experience, Memory, Orality
XII	Pietermaritzburg, South Africa	24–27 Jun 2002	The Power of Oral History: Memory, Healing and Development
XIII	Rome, Italy	23–26 Jun 2004	Memory and Globalization
XIV	Sydney, Australia	12–16 Jul 2006	Dancing with Memory: Oral History and its Audiences
XV	Guadalajara, Mexico	23–26 Sep 2008	Oral History - A Dialogue with our Times
XVI	Prague, Czech Republic	7–11 Jul 2010	Between Past and Future: Oral History, Memory and Meaning
XVII	Buenos Aires, Argentina	3–7 Sep 2012	The Challenges of Oral History in the 21st Century: Diversity, Inequality and Identity Construction
XVIII	Barcelona, Spain	9–12 Jul 2014	Power and Democracy: The Many Voices of Oral History
XIX	Bengaluru, India	27 Jun – 1 Jul 2016	Speaking, Listening, Interpreting: The Critical Engagements of Oral History
XX	Jyväskylä, Finland	18–21 Jun 2018	Memory and Narration
XXI	Singapore (virtual conference)	23–27 Aug 2021	Harmony & Disharmony: Bringing Together Many Voices
XXII	Rio de Janeiro, Brazil	25–28 Jul 2023	Oral History in a Digital and Audiovisual World
XXIII	Kraków, Poland	16–19 Sep 2025	Re-Thinking Oral History
XXIV	Macao Special Administrative Region of the People's Republic of China	2028	TBA
