= Jesusita Aragón =

American midwife (1908–2005)

Aragón with an infant, c. 1977

Jesusita Aragón (1908–2005) was an American midwife and curandera from New Mexico. Known as Doña Jesusita, she delivered around 12,000 babies during her career. She was trained in midwifery by her grandmother and traveled by horseback to provide care to women in northeastern New Mexico. She earned her midwifery certification and moved to Las Vegas, New Mexico, where she built a house which she used as a maternity center. She was named a Santa Fe Living Treasure and received the Sage Femme Award of the Midwives Alliance of North America. The 1980 book La Partera: A Story About a Midwife is about her.

== Early life and family ==
Jesusita Aragón was born to a Hispanic New Mexican family in 1908 at a ranch named El Rancho Trujillo in Sapello, San Miguel County. She was one of eight daughters, only three of whom lived past the age of six. She attended Spanish-language school until the 8th grade. Her mother Antonia died when she was 10 years old.

Aragón's grandmother, Dolores "Lola" Gallegos, was a partera (midwife). She assisted her grandmother with births, delivering her first baby at the age of 14 and earning the title la partera. Her aunt Valentina was a curandera, a traditional healer, and Aragón learned the use of traditional herbs for healing from her. She had two children and was a single mother. Her father refused to talk to her after she became pregnant at the age of 23. He asked her to leave the house after she became pregnant again years later.

== Midwifery career ==
Aragon practiced midwifery in northeastern New Mexico under a teacher until she was 40 years old. She reached her clientele by horseback and was one of the only midwives active in her area. In early 20th-century New Mexico, parteras were the primary caregivers for pregnant women.

In the 1930s, funds were allocated to provide additional training to parteras. Aragón was among several women who participated in two-week trainings in Las Vegas. She earned her midwifery certification. She moved to Las Vegas, New Mexico in 1942. In the early 1950s, she built her own house, raised livestock, and gardened. Her house included a 10-bed maternity room for pregnant women. She would deliver around 200 babies every year, sometimes 10 in a single day.

Over her career, Aragón delivered around 12,000 babies. She was one of the last traditional midwives in New Mexico.

== Later life ==
Aragón retired from midwifery in 1980. She was named a Santa Fe Living Treasure in 1987 and in 1989 was awarded the Sage Femme Award of the Midwives Alliance of North America. Aragón died on April 26, 2005, in Las Vegas.

Fran Leeper Buss wrote the 1980 book La Partera: A Story About a Midwife based on interviews with Aragón.
