= List of daily news podcasts =

The following is a list of daily news podcasts, organized by type (original podcast or adapted media) and then by country. It represents a small subset of news podcasts that release an episode every day, sometimes with the exception of weekends or holidays.

== Original podcasts ==
=== Australia ===
Name	Provider	Presenters	First episode	Ref.
7am	Schwartz Publishing	Ruby Jones	May 2019	
ABC News Daily	ABC News	Samantha Hawley		
PM in the AM	Sky News	Paul Murray	September 2019	
Squiz Today	The Squiz		May 2018	
The Quicky	Mamamia	Claire Murphy	February 2019	
The Signal	ABC Radio		February 2018	

=== Brazil ===
Name	Provider	Presenters	First episode	Ref.
Estadão Notícias	Estadão	Emanuel Bonfim	April 2017	
Durma com Essa	Nexo Jornal	Conrado Corsalette, Olívia Fraga and José Orenstein	September 2018	
Café da Manhã	Folha de S.Paulo and Spotify Studios (Spotify Only)	Rodrigo Vizeu and Magê Flores	January 2019	
Boletim Folha	Folha de S.Paulo		April 2019	
Ao Ponto	O Globo	Carolina Morand and Roberto Maltchik	July 2019	
O Assunto	G1 Podcasts	Natuza Nery (2022-present) Renata Lo Prete (2019-2022)	August 2019	
E Tem Mais	CNN Brazil	Monalisa Perrone	March 2020	

=== Canada ===
Name	Provider	Presenters	First episode	Ref.
Front Burner	CBC News and CBC Podcasts	Jayme Poisson	October 2018	
The Big Story	Frequency Podcast Network by Rogers Radio	Jordan Heath-Rawlings	June 2018	
The Decibel	The Globe and Mail	Menaka Raman-Wilms	May 2021	
This Matters	The Toronto Star	Saba Eitizaz and Raju Mudhar	March 2020	
Wait, There's More (discontinued)	Global News	Tamara Khandaker	June 2019	

=== Germany ===
Name	Provider	Presenters	Ref.
11KM: der tagesschau-Podcast	Tagesschau	Victoria Michalczak	
Auf den Punkt	Süddeutsche Zeitung	Lars Langenau, Vinzent-Vitus Leitgeb, and Jean-Marie Magro	
BILD News Update	Bild		
Der Tag	Deutschlandfunk	Jasper Barenberg, Ann-Kathrin Büüsker, Philipp May, and Sarah Zerback	
Die Lage	Der Spiegel		
F.A.Z. Frühdenker	Frankfurter Allgemeine Zeitung		
F.A.Z. Podcast für Deutschland	Frankfurter Allgemeine Zeitung	Angelika Fey, Kathrin Jakob, Sandra Klüber, Andreas Krobok, Marie Löwenstein, and Timo Steppat	
Handelsblatt Morning Briefing	Handelsblatt	Hans-Jürgen Jakobs	
Kick-off Politik	Die Welt / upday		
Steingarts Morning Briefing	Media Pioneer	Gabor Steingart, Michael Bröcker, and Dagmar Rosenfeld	
Tagesanbruch	t-online	Florian Harms	
Thema heute	SWR1		
Was jetzt?	Zeit Online	Fabian Scheler, Sven Stockrahm, Ole Pflüger, and Erica Zingher	

=== New Zealand ===
Name	Provider	Presenters	First episode	Ref.
The Detail	Newsroom in conjunction with RNZ and NZ On Air	Sharon Brettkelly and Alex Ashton	April 2019	
The Front Page	New Zealand Herald	Chelsea Daniels	March 2022	

=== United Kingdom ===
Name	Provider	Presenters	First episode	Ref.
Beyond Today	BBC Radio 4	Tina Daheley and Matthew Price	October 2018	
Coffee House Shots	The Spectator	Fraser Nelson, James Forsyth, Isabel Hardman, and Katy Balls	January 2016	
FT News Briefing	Financial Times	Marc Filippino	October 2018	
Global News Podcast	BBC World Service			
Sky News Daily	Sky News	Dermot Murnaghan		
The Intelligence	The Economist	Jason Palmer	January 2019	
The Leader	Evening Standard	David Marsland	September 2019	
The Monocle Minute	Monocle		August 2019	
The News Agents	Global Media & Entertainment	Emily Maitlis, Jon Sopel, and Lewis Goodall	August 2022	
The Smart 7	Daft Doris	Jamie East	April 2020	
Today in Focus	The Guardian	Anushka Asthana	November 2018	

=== United States ===
Name	Provider	Presenters	First episode	Ref.
5 Things	USA Today	Taylor Wilson and Claire Thornton	December 2016	
Apple News Today	Apple News	Shumita Basu and Duarte Geraldino	July 2020	
Axios Re:Cap	Axios	Dan Primack	July 2018	
Axios Today	Axios	Niala Boodhoo	June 2020	
The Ben Shapiro Show	The Daily Wire	Ben Shapiro		
Briefly	OZY		September 2015	
Business Wars Daily	Wondery	David Brown	July 2018	
City Cast Boise	City Cast	Emma Arnold		
City Cast Chicago	City Cast	Jacoby Cochran		
City Cast DC	City Cast	Michael Schaffer, Bridget Todd		
City Cast Denver	City Cast	Bree Davies		
City Cast Houston	City Cast	Lisa Gray		
City Cast Las Vegas	City Cast	Dayvid Figler, Sarah Lohman		
City Cast Madison	City Cast	Bianca Martin		
City Cast Philly	City Cast	Trenae Nuri		
City Cast Pittsburgh	City Cast	Morgan Moody		
City Cast Portland	City Cast	Claudia Meza		
City Cast Salt Lake	City Cast	Ali Vallarta		
Cheat Sheet Podcast	The Daily Beast		September 2018	
CNN Daily News Briefing	CNN			
CNN Political Briefing	CNN	David Chalian	August 2020	
CNN This Morning	CNN	Poppy Harlow and Phil Mattingly		
CNN Tonight	CNN			
Consider This	NPR	Kelly McEvers	March 2020	
Good Morning America	ABC News	Robin Roberts, George Stephanopoulos, Michael Strahan and Ginger Zee		
Hard Factor	Barstool Sports	Pat Cassidy, Mark Borghi, Wes Shephard and Will Smith	June 2018	
Meet the Press: The Lid	NBC News		April 2018	
The Megyn Kelly Show	Devil May Care Media	Megyn Kelly	September 2020	
Minute Briefing	The Wall Street Journal		February 2017	
Morning Wire	The Daily Wire	John Bickley and Georgia Howe	July 2021	
NowThis Brief	NowThis News		September 2020	
NPR News Now	NPR		June 2018	
The Playbook Podcast	Politico	Jack Blanchard and Dasha Burns	May 2025	
Post Reports	The Washington Post	Martine Powers	December 2018	
Skimm This	The Skimm		March 2019	
Start Here	ABC News	Brad Mielke	March 2018	
Tech News Briefing	The Wall Street Journal	Amanda Lewellyn and others		
The Daily	The New York Times	Michael Barbaro	February 2017	
The Daily 202's Big Idea	The Washington Post	James Hohmann	July 2017	
The Daily Beans	Starburns Audio (Mueller, She Wrote)	Jordan Coburn, Amanda Reeder, and "A.G."	July 2019	
The Daily Dive	iHeartRadio	Oscar Ramirez	April 2018	
The Daily Signal	The Daily Signal	Virginia Allen, Rachel del Guidice, and Katrina Trinko	April 2016	
The Gist	Slate	Mike Pesca	May 2014	
The Indicator	NPR	Various (see Planet Money)	December 2017	
The Journal	The Wall Street Journal and Spotify	Kate Linebaugh, Ryan Knutson, and Jessica Mendoza	September 2019	
The NewsWorthy	The NewsWorthy Inc.	Erica Mandy	August 2017	
The Point with Chris Cillizza and Lauren Dezenski	CNN	Chris Cillizza and Lauren Dezenski	June 2017	
The Washington Times Front Page	The Washington Times	George Gerbo	September 2019	
Time's The Brief	Time			
Today, Explained	Vox Media Podcast Network	Sean Rameswaram	February 2018	
Up First	NPR	Rachel Martin, David Greene, and Steve Inskeep	April 2017	
What a Day	Crooked Media	Akilah Hughes, Gideon Resnick	October 2019	
What Next	Slate	Mary Harris	October 2018	
What's News	The Wall Street Journal	Annmarie Fertoli & Luke Vargas	April 2019 (relaunched)	
Your Money Briefing	The Wall Street Journal	J.R. Whalen, Charlie Turner and others		

== Adapted radio and television shows ==
Name	Provider	Presenters	Original medium	Country	Ref.
CBS Evening News	CBS	Norah O'Donnell	Television	US	
CBS World News Roundup	CBS News Radio		Radio	US	
CTV National News	CTV	Lisa LaFlamme	Television	CAN	
CTV Power Play Podcast	CTV	Evan Solomon	Television	CAN	
Fox News Rundown	Fox News Radio	Jacqui Heinrich, Dave Anthony, Lisa Brady, Jessica Rosenthal and Chris Foster	Radio	US	
Marketplace Morning Report	American Public Media	David Brancaccio	Radio	US	
NBC Nightly News	NBC	Lester Holt	Television	US	
Nightline	ABC Audio	Dan Harris, Juju Chang and Byron Pitts	Television	US	
PBS Newshour	PBS	Judy Woodruff	Television	US	
The Last Word with Lawrence O’Donnell	MSNBC	Lawrence O'Donnell	Television	US	
The Lead with Jake Tapper	CNN	Jake Tapper	Television	US	
The News with Shepard Smith	CNBC	Shepard Smith	Television	US	
The Rachel Maddow Show	MSNBC	Rachel Maddow	Television	US	
The Situation Room with Wolf Blitzer	CNN	Wolf Blitzer	Television	US	
The World at Six	CBC	Susan Bonner	Radio	CAN	
This Morning With Gordan Deal	Compass Media Networks	Gordan Deal	Radio	US	
World News Tonight with David Muir	ABC Audio	David Muir	Television	US	
World Report	CBC	Nil Köksal and Marcia Young	Radio	CAN	
