= Andrea Seabrook =

American journalist (born 1974)

- Born: January 14, 1974 (age 52)
- Education: Earlham College
- Occupations: Radio, podcast personality
- Years active: 2001-present
- Known for: Morning Edition; DecodeDC

Andrea Seabrook (born January 14, 1974) is an American journalist. She is best known for her work in public radio, primarily on NPR and ‘’Marketplace’’.

Seabrook was among the first on-air public radio personalities to leave NPR and start a successful, independent podcast, DecodeDC, which was later acquired by the E.W. Scripps Corp. Seabrook went on to serve as DC Bureau Chief of Marketplace with Kai Ryssdal, and then Managing Editor of the civic-tech app, Countable. Seabrook has since moved to Costa Rica and founded a bilingual newspaper called The Monteverde News.

== Life ==
Seabrook received a bachelor's degree in biology from Earlham College in 1996. While at Earlham, Seabrook worked at WECI, the college's public radio station. As part of her degree, Seabrook studied Latin American literature at La UNAM, The National Autonomous University of Mexico in Mexico City.

Seabrook began reporting for NPR in 2001, after working on Anthem, an NPR music program, and working in the Mexico Bureau and provided fill-in coverage of Mexico and Central America. She then returned to NPR headquarters in Washington, and worked on Radio Expeditions, a joint series of NPR and National Geographic. She then went to work on Morning Edition with Bob Edwards.

In July 2012, Seabrook left NPR and has started the political podcast DecodeDC with the goal of “deciphering Washington's Byzantine language and procedure, sweeping away what doesn't matter so listeners can focus on what does". The project was funded in part by a $100,724 Kickstarter campaign and a partnership with SoundCloud.

In September 2012, DecodeDC moved to the Mule Radio Podcast Syndicate. In November 2013, DecodeDC was acquired by the E.W. Scripps Corp. Seabrook left Scripps in 2015.

In June 2016, Seabrook became the DC Bureau Chief of Marketplace with Kai Ryssdal and then in 2017, Seabrook became the Managing Editor of Countable, the premier civic technology app in the U.S.

In 2018, Seabrook moved to Monteverde, Costa Rica, where she founded The Monteverde News, a bilingual news organization.
