= America Abroad =

- Genre: News: Global news, analysis, interviews, discussion
- Country of origin: United States
- Language: English
- Syndicates: PRI Public Radio International
- Hosted by: Madeleine Brand
- Produced by: Rob Sachs, Yael Even Or
- Original release: 2003 – 2018
- Audio format: Stereophonic
- Website: http://www.americaabroad.org
- Podcast: http://www.publicbroadcasting.net/america-abroad/podcasts/553.xml

America Abroad was a monthly documentary radio program produced by America Abroad Media (AAM), a Washington D.C.–based non-profit organization. The program was distributed by Public Radio International (PRI) and broadcast on public radio stations around the United States. Former hosts include Madeleine Brand, Hari Sreenivasan and Ray Suarez. Each month, America Abroad worked with independent reporters from several countries.

America Abroad began broadcasting on February 1, 2003, with a program on the invasion of Iraq. The program was broadcast six times per year until it became a monthly program in September 2007. AAM was awarded $600,000 in 2007 by the Hewlett Foundation for its radio programing particularly America Abroad. America Abroad ended in 2018.
