= Caliphate (podcast) =

History podcast

- Cover of the podcast
- Language: English

Cast and voices
- Hosted by: Rukmini Callimachi

Production
- Production: Andy Mills; Larissa Anderson (managing); Asthaa Chaturvedi (associate)

Publication
- No. of seasons: 1
- No. of episodes: 12
- Original release: April 19 – June 21, 2018
- Provider: The New York Times
- Updates: Ended

Caliphate is a narrative podcast published by The New York Times in 2018 which covers the Islamic State of Iraq and the Levant (ISIL). It was hosted by reporter Rukmini Callimachi. The central figure of the podcast was Pakistani-Canadian Shehroze Chaudhry (using the name "Abu Huzaifa al-Kanadi"), who described in detail atrocities he claimed to have committed in Syria for ISIL. Concerns were raised that his story was a fabrication or a grave misrepresentation, and in 2020 Chaudhry was arrested by the Royal Canadian Mounted Police's O Division Integrated National Security Enforcement Team (OINSET) for lying about participating in terrorist activities. Following his arrest, The New York Times admitted to a severe editorial failing and retracted Chaudry's story.

== Synopsis ==
A large portion of the podcast is dedicated to following the story of a Canadian ex-ISIL fighter using the nom de guerre Abu Huzaifa al-Kanadi. Callimachi found Huzaifa through Instagram, and conducted an in-person interview in a hotel in Canada. The show details Huzaifa's radicalization and career as a member of ISIL's police, including an admission of carrying out executions on behalf of the ISIL.

== Initial reception ==
The podcast received a Peabody Award and the Overseas Press Club of America award in 2019. Both would later be returned by the Times after doubts around Chaudry's story came to light.

Callimachi was a finalist for the 2019 Pulitzer Prize for International Reporting for her reporting on ISIL, which included the podcast and "The ISIS Files" database. On December 22, 2020, the Pulitzer Prizes board indicated it would rescind the finalist status at the request of the Times.

In 2018, Caliphate won International Documentary Association's (IDA) documentary awards for the year's best audio documentary. The audio documentary category was awarded for the best in stand-alone and episodic series nonfiction storytelling in radio & podcast.

== Abdul Huzaifa al-Kanadi controversy ==
On May 11, 2018, Conservative members of the Parliament of Canada demanded that Public Safety minister Ralph Goodale take action against Huzaifa. Shortly after, Huzaifa told the CBC that he had lied about carrying out executions for ISIL.

Huzaifa was arrested on September 25, 2020, after an investigation found that he had no ties to ISIL. He was charged with "hoax-terrorist activity", which is primarily used to prosecute fake bomb threats. Following his arrest, The New York Times revealed Huzaifa's real name (Shehroze Chaudhry) and announced that it would make a "fresh examination" of why he was featured on the podcast. On December 18, editors appended a note to the episode transcripts stating that "the episodes of 'Caliphate' that presented Mr. Chaudhry's claims did not meet our standards for accuracy", in addition to releasing another episode on the podcast's feed discussing the hoax. The Washington Post argued that the editors' note "fell short of a full retraction". Michael Barbaro, host of the Times's The Daily, tweeted that "several episodes of the series do not touch on Chaudhry and their accuracy is not in question"; of the podcast's ten episodes, seven were centered around Chaudhry.

Callimachi was reassigned following the incident, and the Overseas Press Club rescinded the award they had given for the podcast. On December 18, 2020, the Times also announced that, in view of the results of its investigation into the matter, it would return the Peabody Award which had been won by the podcast.
