= Ranji Smile =

Indian-American celebrity chef

- Born: Karachi
- Occupation: cook
- Known for: called "America’s first celebrity chef"

Ranji Smile (born c. 1870s) was an immigrant to the United States who, following his efforts to popularize different methods of food preparation, in the early 20th century, has triggered calling him "America’s first celebrity chef".

In the late 1890s, when Smile was in his twenties, he was a chef in London, England, when he was hired to work in America.

He arrived in New York City in 1899, first working at Sherry's Restaurant, and later offering demonstrations of how to prepare Indian cuisine.

According to Edible Brooklyn historians Sarah Lohman and Vivek Bald's research identified Smile as an example of an undocumented immigrant. Lohman found that Smile arrived in the USA without documentation, but had appeared before a senior judge, to appeal for the right to apply for citizenship, in 1904. His petition was denied. She noted that the Naturalization Act of 1790 only allowed free white men to apply for citizenship. She noted that the Immigration Act of 1917 explicitly barred South Asian men from applying for citizenship, while also requiring them to register for the possible conscription into the Armed Services.

Smile left New York in 1929. The New York Post wrote he left an undeniable mark on the culinary landscape.
