= Day to Day =

Defunct weekday National Public Radio program

- Genre: News: analysis, commentary, features, interviews, specials
- Running time: ca. 50 minutes
- Country of origin: United States
- Language(s): English
- Syndicates: National Public Radio
- Hosted by: Madeleine Brand
- Directed by: Kathryn Fox, Shereen Meraji, Andy Houlihan, Ki Sung
- Produced by: Steve Proffitt; Chip Grabow; Neal Carruth; Sarah Spivack; Martina Castro; Kenya Young
- Executive producer(s): Deborah Clark
- Recording studio: NPR West; Culver City, California
- Original release: July 2003 – March 20, 2009
- Audio format: Stereophonic
- Website: npr.org/programs/day
- Podcast: Podcast / RSS feed

Day to Day (D2D) was a one-hour weekday American radio newsmagazine distributed by National Public Radio (NPR), and produced by NPR in collaboration with Slate. Madeleine Brand, Alex Chadwick, and Alex Cohen served as hosts. Topics regularly covered by D2D included news, entertainment, politics and the arts; contributors included familiar NPR personalities, reporters from NPR member stations, writers for Slate, and reporters from Marketplace, a show produced by American Public Media. D2D premiered on Monday, July 28, 2003, and fed to stations from noon ET with updates through 4:00 p.m. ET. It was the fastest growing program in NPR's history.

On December 10, 2008, NPR announced Day to Day would be canceled with its final episode to be broadcast on March 20, 2009. According to NPR as of December 2008 Day to Day was airing on 186 stations and attracting a weekly cumulative audience of 1.8 million listeners.

According to Dennis Haarsager, NPR's acting CEO, D2D was not "attracting sufficient levels of audience or national underwriting necessary to sustain continued production" now that NPR's projected budget deficit for the 2009 fiscal year grew from $2 million in July, to $23 million in December.

The final data released after March 2008 showed that the program had a weekly cumulative audience of 2,036,400, placing it third nationally behind only Talk of the Nation and Fresh Air for all midday public radio programming.

== Background ==
Day to Day began as a co-production with the then-Microsoft-owned Slate that was "targeted for midday broadcast" and designed to "showcase newsworthy topics with a smart, savvy and spontaneous approach" with a "diverse family of contributors from both NPR News and Slate"; it was the "first program collaboration NPR has initiated with a commercial media outlet in its 33-year history." The partnership was criticized in the Online Journalism Review for "possible conflicts on Microsoft coverage (or lack thereof)" and the "cross-media advertisements and underwriting" plans.

Day to Day debuted on public radio stations in July 2003. and was the first NPR newsmagazine produced at NPR West studios in Culver City, California, near Los Angeles.

== Format ==
While Day to Day was divided into segments similar in length to those on Morning Edition and All Things Considered, there were at least two major differences: the C segment was divided into two sections; and the program had a shorter total running time—one hour compared to two for the larger newsmagazines.

Day to Day began with a sixty-second billboard, wherein Alex Chadwick and Madeleine Brand talk about what will be coming up on the show. The billboard is followed by the standard NPR newscast from one minute past to six minutes past the hour. Some stations utilized the last 2.5 minutes of the newscast to deliver local midday news reports. A thirty-second music bed follows, and then Segment A begins.

Segment A (duration 12:29) contained the top story of the day, and usually synopses of longer-term issues viewed through the lens of current events. Segment topics ranged from the American judicial system to economics to geopolitics to conversations with notable newsmakers, and more. Segment A closed at nineteen minutes past the hour and leads into a two-minute station break.

At twenty-one after, Segment B (duration 7:49) began. Segment B composed the remainder of the first half-hour, and as such continued coverage on important news events of the day, or segued into lighter culturally or socially relevant stories. Segment B closes at 28:50 past the hour, and goes into a local break until the bottom of the hour.

At half past the hour, Day to Day returned with Segment C1 (duration 5:14), usually reserved for updates on stories presented in the first half-hour, or different angles on major news stories. Segment C2 (duration 3:59) was home to the Marketplace report, a discussion about an item of business news with a reporter from Marketplace, capped with a short preview of that evening's program. C2 ended at 39:30 after the hour.

Following another thirty-second music break, Day to Day entered Segment D (duration 8:59). There was little specificity to the content of Segment D; stories ranged from international and domestic issues to long-term reports on a variety of topics. Segment D ran from forty minutes to forty-nine minutes past the hour, and another two-minute station break ensued.

Segment E (duration 8:20) began at fifty-one minutes past the hour. For the show's first three years, it was divided into Segments E1 and E2, which lasted roughly three and a half minutes each. On February 20, 2007, Day to Day combined the two E segments into one long one. Segment E was usually devoted to commentary and light features, including "The Unger Report", a satirical take on news and current events. Time permitting, Segment E was followed up by the credits, and Day to Day came to a close.

== Personnel ==
=== Hosts ===
For its first two and a half years, Day to Day was usually hosted by either longtime NPR host and correspondent Alex Chadwick or NPR news host Madeleine Brand. On January 16, 2006, Chadwick and Brand began co-hosting each program.

On Friday, November 7, 2008, Chadwick anchored his final broadcast on the show. Brand continued to anchor the remainder of Day to Day's run, along with rotating co-hosts.

NPR personalities Noah Adams, Alex Cohen and Mike Pesca often served as substitute hosts for the program.

=== Staff ===
- Executive Producer Deborah Clark
- Supervising Senior Producer Chip Grabow
- Supervising Senior Editor Martha Little
- Director Andy Houlihan
- Producers Steve Proffitt, Christopher Johnson, Sarah Spivack, Skye Rohde, Nihar Patel, Ki Sung
- Editors Jacob Conrad, Jason DeRose, Jolie Myers
- Staff Reporter Alex Cohen
- Contributing Producer Joe Bevilacqua

=== Contributors ===
- Brian Unger, "The Unger Report" humor and satirical commentary
- Michelle Singletary, "The Color of Money" personal finance
- Dahlia Lithwick, legal analyst
- John Dickerson, political analyst
- Xeni Jardin, "Xeni Tech" technology
- David Was, music
- Annabelle Gurwitch, humorous commentary
- Jennifer Sharpe, oddities
- Mark Jordan Legan, "Summary Judgment" movie reviews
- Veronique de Turenne, book reviews
- Andrew Wallenstein, television reviews
- Ira Flatow, science and technology
- Sydney Spiesel, personal health
- Scott Carrier, investigative journalism

== See also ==
- Here and Now, which replaced Day to Day on many stations
