= Madeleine Brand =

American journalist

- Born: Los Angeles, California, U.S.
- Education: Columbia University Graduate School of Journalism; UC Berkeley
- Occupation: Broadcast journalist
- Notable credit(s): Press Play, The Madeleine Brand Show (later Brand & Martínez), Day to Day, Morning Edition, All Things Considered

Madeleine Brand is an American broadcast journalist and radio personality. Brand is the host of the news and culture show Press Play, on KCRW-FM (89.9), one of Los Angeles' two National Public Radio (NPR) affiliates. The show made its debut in January 2014. Brand broadcasts from the KCRW building, located on Santa Monica College's Center for Media and Design campus.

== Education ==
A Los Angeles native, Brand grew up in the Hollywood Hills area of Los Angeles and the San Francisco Bay area.

Brand attended the University of California, Berkeley, beginning her radio career on college radio station KALX; she earned a B.A. in English, with honors, in 1988. She later received a master's degree from the Columbia University Graduate School of Journalism, where she later returned to teach documentary radio.

== Career ==
Brand reported and anchored for NPR for thirteen years at various affiliates across the country: KQED, San Francisco; WBUR, Boston; WBGO, Newark, and WBFO, Buffalo. She served as West Coast correspondent and occasional substitute host for Morning Edition and All Things Considered. In 2006, she began co-hosting the radio program Day to Day with Alex Chadwick, which broadcast from NPR West studios in Los Angeles.

In 2010, Brand became host of the new daily Southern California Public Radio program The Madeleine Brand Show on the public radio station KPCC, which aired between 9 a.m. and 11 a.m. Pacific Time. The show broadcast from the Mohn Broadcast Center in Pasadena. The show was popular for its first 23 months, and was the station's most-listened-to in-house program (with the highest Arbitron rankings), and won a number of radio journalism awards. However, the show came to an "abrupt end" after KPCC paired Brand with longtime ESPN sports reporter A Martínez in an attempt to attract Latino listeners and fulfill the requirements of a $6 million Corporation for Public Broadcasting grant. The pairing of the two hosts, under the name Brand & Martínez, debuted August 13, 2012, but lasted just four weeks and was a failure, in part because the two had met only twice before the program began. Brand left the station in September 2012 and was replaced by Alex Cohen (the show was renamed Take Two).

Following her time at NPR, Brand was briefly at the Los Angeles public television station KCET as a special contributor to the fifth season of SoCal Connected, hosted by Val Zavala.

In Summer 2013, Brand occasionally substituted for longtime broadcaster Warren Olney IV on his show To the Point on KPCC's rival KCRW. In September 2013, Brand moved to KCRW and began to develop Press Play, which debuted in January 2014, becoming the first new daily program on KCRW since 2001. Press Play competes against Larry Mantle's AirTalk on KPCC.

== Personal life ==
Brand is married to filmmaker Joe DeMarie, and together they have two children. She lives in the Silver Lake neighborhood of Los Angeles.
