= Alex Cohen =

American broadcast journalist

Alexandra "Alex" Cohen (born July 8, 1972) is an American radio and Emmy Award winning television journalist, roller derby skater, and author.

== Early life ==
Cohen was born in New York City and moved to California at the age of two. She studied at Interlochen Arts Academy in Michigan, Brown University (B.A. in Eastern Religions, 1993), and the University of California, Berkeley Graduate School of Journalism (Master of Journalism). Cohen is the daughter of Kip Cohen, a former American arts and entertainment executive, concert presenter, record company executive and goddaughter of American rock concert promoter Bill Graham. Her brother is musician Chris Cohen.

== Career ==
Cohen began her radio career at National Public Radio in Washington, D.C. as producer and director for Weekly Edition and Weekend All Things Considered. From 2000 to 2003, Cohen worked for San Francisco's KQED first as a producer for the statewide radio program California Report and later as the Los Angeles bureau chief for the same program. Cohen has also reported for American Public Media's financial news program Marketplace and served as host of the weekly APM program Weekend America. She was a host and reporter for NPR's daily news program, Day to Day and moved to KPCC radio in Pasadena, California. Cohen was the afternoon host and reporter for "All Things Considered" from 2009-2012 before being named co-host of the 9-11 am morning program, "Take Two."

In September 2018, Cohen was named morning news anchor and host for Spectrum Cable's all-news channel for Southern California. Cohen will also host a one-hour political program, "Inside the Issues."

In July 2020, Cohen was part of the Spectrum News team recognized with an Emmy Award for the program “Under the Gun.”

== Roller derby ==
From 2003-2010, Cohen was a member of the Los Angeles Derby Dolls, using the derby name "Axles of Evil", and TXRD Lonestar Rollergirls, skating as "Smother Theresa". In 2009, Cohen was hired to work on the Drew Barrymore-directed roller derby film, Whip It. Cohen co-wrote an insider's guide to roller derby called Down and Derby, published in 2010.

== Personal life ==
In August 2007, Cohen, at age 35, married Richard Dean, then 41 and the technology director of a public radio station in Austin, Texas.

== Filmography ==
- Whip It (2009, Fox Searchlight) as skate trainer, derby consultant, and herself

== Books ==
- Down and Derby (2010, New York, Soft Skull Press) is her insider's account of the history and culture of the roller derby.
