= Steve Proffitt =

American radio journalist

Steve Proffitt is an American radio journalist who is the former Senior Producer for the NPR newsmagazine, Day to Day. Proffitt began his public broadcasting career at KERA in Dallas. He joined NPR in 1980 and served as an editor and producer. It was there that he began producing short, highly produced features on banal topics: a 1982 piece, DUST being an example his early work.

In 1983, Proffitt moved to Los Angeles, where he contributed stories to NPR programs, produced books-on-tape and wrote movie trailers. In 1987 he joined CBS News as an associate producer, and shortly thereafter began a 10-year run as a contributing editor to the Los Angeles Times' Sunday Opinion section.

In the mid-1990s, Proffitt joined a Los Angeles advertising agency that was creating one of the first internet production units. He helped build early Web sites for clients such as Canon and Sony. In 2000, he took a position with the consulting firm Sapient, where his clients included Hallmark, Washington Mutual and Nissan.

Proffitt returned to NPR in early 2003 to work on the launch of Day to Day. One of his favorite pieces is SLIDERS, a portrait of two middle-aged guys in Berkeley, California, who ride skateboards, at speeds of up to fifty miles an hour through the hilly streets and highways in that northern California community. NPR, faced with a large budget deficit, canceled Day to Day in 2009.

Proffitt has worked at Los Angeles public TV station KCET, and taught journalism as an adjunct professor at the USC Annenberg School. In 2009, he helped launch for The Madeleine Brand Show, produced by KPCC/Southern California Public Radio. He remained at KPCC as senior producer and program developer until his retirement from journalism in 2017.

Proffitt then turned his attention to his longtime avocation, music. He began writing songs and performing under the name Ol Man Proffitt. In 2025, at the age of 73, he released his first record album, Idyllwild Moon.
