= Jim Russell (journalist) =

American journalist (1946–2022)

James B. Russell
- Born: January 30, 1946; Hartford, Connecticut, U.S.
- Died: September 13, 2022 (aged 76); Chapel Hill, North Carolina, U.S.
- Education: American University School of Communication
- Occupations: Journalist, Radio producer, Television producer
- Years active: 1963–2022
- Notable credit(s): Marketplace; Weekend America
- Awards: Alfred I. duPont–Columbia University Award, Peabody Award, Emmy Award

James B. Russell (January 30, 1946 – September 13, 2022) was an American journalist, producer, and executive who created national programs for all three public radio networks: National Public Radio, Public Radio International and American Public Media, as well as for PBS.

Russell worked for more than thirty years in commercial radio, print, public radio, and television. Programs he helped create include Marketplace, Weekend America, and public TV's Newton's Apple, NightTimes, Electronicle and America After Vietnam. He also helped develop NPR's Morning Edition and All Things Considered, and PRI's The World.

Russell was a 1973–1974 NEH Journalism Fellow at the University of Michigan.

== Personal life ==
As a result of having a US Foreign Service employee as a parent, grew up in Pakistan, Greece and Italy until age 16, which he credited with giving him "the ability to look at the world and my own country through others’ eyes.”

Russell began working for commercial radio stations in the Washington, D.C. market as a college student, including one of the earliest stations dedicated entirely to news; there, he delivered live coverage of major events including the Poor People's March on Washington, a protest against the Vietnam War in front of the Pentagon, and the 1968 Washington, D.C., riots following the assassination of Martin Luther King.

In his final years, Russell was the president of his consulting company, Jim Russell Productions—The Program Doctor.

He died on September 13, 2022, after suffering a fall and spending several days in the intensive care unit followed by hospice.
