= Alex Chadwick =

American journalist

- Occupation: Journalist
- Notable credit(s): All Things Considered; Day to Day; Weekend Edition
- Spouse: Carolyn Jensen

Alex Chadwick is an American journalist best known for his work on National Public Radio, and as a former co-host of the radio newsmagazine Day to Day. He was a part of the development of NPR's Morning Edition in the 1970s and was an on-air personality on All Things Considered and Weekend Edition. Chadwick has also worked with ABC and CBS.

This American Life host Ira Glass has written often about Chadwick's influence on his work. In a 2000 commencement speech to the UC Berkeley Graduate School of Journalism, Glass said, "I went through a very early phase that lasted about half a year. Whenever I would get into any kind of trouble in writing about some moment, some scene, how do you get into the story, how do you end the story, there was this NPR reporter who I adored, who I thought was just the most amazing writer. He is a really wonderful writer, named Alex Chadwick. And I would simply decide I am going to write this story as Alex Chadwick. And I would sit there and try to completely write this thing in this guy’s voice, totally do it as him, literally write this story as this man who was not myself. I have to say I created some very nice scripts like that."

In January 2009, NPR laid off Chadwick. He was one of 67 employees terminated after a budget shortfall attributed to a drop in corporate underwriting during the 2008 financial crisis.

Chadwick continues to do a video blog for Slate V called "Interviews, 50 cents."

Chadwick received the Sigma Delta Chi Award for investigative journalism and two Lowell Thomas Awards from the Overseas Press Club for foreign reporting, and was part of the CBS News team that produced the Emmy Award- and Peabody Award-winning documentary In the Killing Fields of America.

Chadwick was married to Radio Expeditions executive producer Carolyn Jensen, who died in 2010.
