= Rukmini Callimachi =

Romanian-American journalist (born 1973)

- Born: Rukmini Maria Sichitiu; 25 June 1973 (age 53); Bucharest, Socialist Republic of Romania
- Education: Dartmouth College; University of Oxford
- Occupation: Journalist
- Awards: Aurora Prize, Sidney Hillman Foundation Award, Overseas Press Club of America (rescinded), Peabody Award (rescinded)

Rukmini Maria Callimachi (born Sichitiu on 25 June 1973) is a Romanian-born American journalist. She currently works for The New York Times. She had been a Pulitzer Prize finalist four times. She hosted the New York Times podcast Caliphate, which won a Peabody Award, but the Times returned the award after an investigation cast doubt on a significant portion of the podcast.

== Early life and education ==
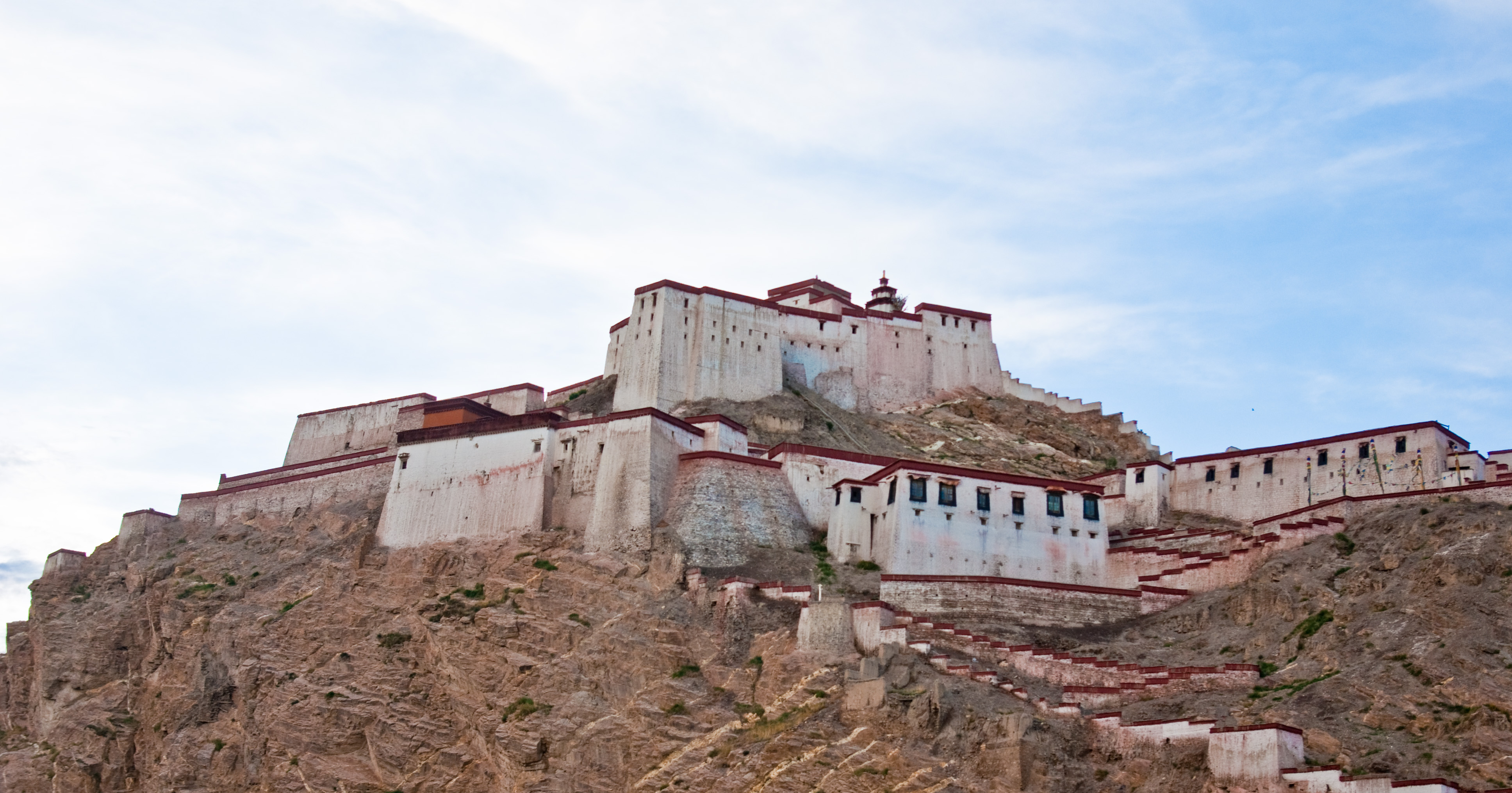
Gyantse Fortress in Tibet, where Callimachi traveled for the RGS

Callimachi was named "Rukmini" (Sanskrit Rukmiṇī (Devanagari: Sanskrit: रुक्मिणी IPA: [rukmiɳiː]) after the Indian theosophist Rukmini Devi Arundale, founder of Kalakshetra Foundation in Chennai, India, with whom her family was close. Her original surname was Sichitiu. She is the stepdaughter of Mihai Botez, a scientist and dissident who opposed the Romanian communist regime. Along her maternal lines, she descends from the Callimachi family of Phanariotes (which is also Greco-Romanian), an ancestral lineage traced back to Eufrosina Callimachi, daughter of Hospodar Scarlat Callimachi. Rukmini changed her last name to Callimachi to honor this legacy.

Rukmini Sichitiu left Romania in 1979 at age five. Her mother and grandmother had taken her on a trip to Switzerland, during which they defected. Rukmini's father remained in Bucharest to alleviate suspicions and finally joined them in 1980. As she recalls, she had a hard time fitting into Swiss society. Four years later, her parents separated. While her father stayed in Lausanne, Rukmini and her mother left for Ojai, California, where Rukmini attended primary school. She later graduated from The Oak Grove School and The Thacher School, both in Ojai, California. She earned diplomas from Dartmouth College and from Exeter College at the University of Oxford, where she did graduate studies in linguistics.

== Career ==
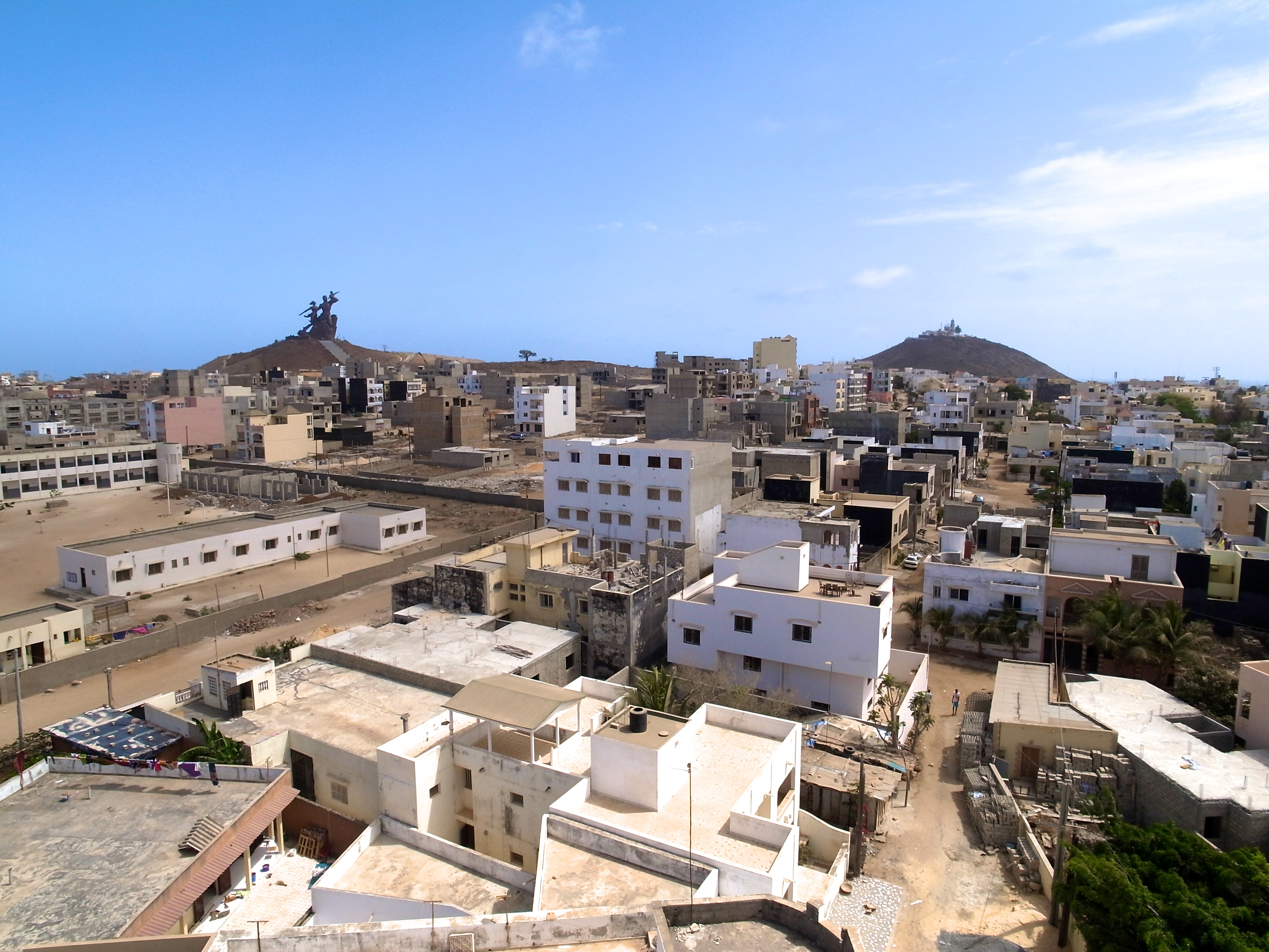
Deux Mamelles from afar, with African Renaissance Monument on left, Les Mamelles Lighthouse on right, in Senegal, where Callimachi has reported

After publishing some poetry, Callimachi became a freelancer in New Delhi, India, including for Time magazine. In 2003, she joined the Associated Press in Portland, Oregon. After a year in New Orleans documenting the aftermath of Hurricane Katrina, in 2006 she began reporting out of Dakar, Senegal, as a West African correspondent for the Associated Press. There she focused on investigating the exploitation of children in West and Central Africa, for which she was named a Pulitzer Finalist in International Reporting in 2009. Callimachi later became known for her work on extremism, and was again named Pulitzer Finalist in 2014.

In 2014, Callimachi was hired by The New York Times. Her reporting focused on Islamic extremism, which helped the Times earn a Pulitzer Finalist accolade in 2016 as part of a group entry. Callimachi's work in investigative journalism was recognised in 2016, as she won the inaugural International Center for Journalists' Integrity in Journalism Award.

The Washington Post reported in 2020 that Callimachi was reassigned at the Times and "will no longer cover terrorism."

== ISIS reporting ==
=== Caliphate ===
The serialized audio documentary Caliphate, first released in April 2018, follows Callimachi as she reports on the Islamic State, and the accounts of Abu Huzaifa al-Kanadi, who claimed to have murdered people while fighting for the Islamic State, and since returned to Canada where he was living freely. The podcast won a Peabody Award in the radio/podcast category that year. Her work on Caliphate also made her a Pulitzer finalist again "[f]or dissecting the power and persistence of the ISIS terror movement, through relentless on-the-ground and online reporting, and masterful use of podcast storytelling."

In May 2018, the reliability of Huzaifa's story had drawn the concern of journalists at CBC News. According to a report by CBC's Diana Swain, key elements of Huzaifa's story in Caliphate did not match what he told CBC in September 2017. This led CBC reporters to wonder if Huzaifa lied to either CBC or to The New York Times. In September 2020, the Canadian Abu Huzaifa, whose real name was Shehroze Chaudhry, was arrested by Royal Canadian Mounted Police (RCMP) and charged under Canadian hoax laws for fabricating his story on social media of traveling to Syria and joining ISIS, which was covered by the Caliphate podcast produced by The New York Times. His case continues. In response to criticism of Caliphate's depiction of Chaudry's story, the Times announced on 30 September that the paper would begin a "fresh examination" of the series's reporting.

In December 2020, The New York Times admitted to significant errors, including that much of the Caliphate podcast had been based on bad information, and that the "podcast as a whole should not have been produced with Mr. Chaudhry as a central narrative character." Callimachi was reassigned as a result. On 18 December 2020, the Times also announced that, in view of the results of its investigation, it would return the Peabody Award that had been won by the Caliphate podcast.

=== The ISIS Files ===
Over 15,000 files, now known as "The ISIS Files"—obtained by Callimachi and her "Iraqi colleagues during embeds with the Iraqi army"—were digitized, translated, and released by The New York Times in partnership with George Washington University beginning in 2018. Since 2020 the files have been available online.

There has been criticism of how Callimachi acquired the ISIS Files. The documents were alleged to have been removed from Iraq without permission. After digitization, the files were given to the Embassy of the Republic of Iraq in Washington, DC.

== Awards ==
- 2020 Great Immigrants Award named by Carnegie Corporation of New York
- 2018 Peabody Award in News and Radio/Podcast (later returned by the New York Times)
- 2016 Aurora Prize for Integrity in Journalism.
- 2014 Michael Kelly Award and finalist in 2009 and 2012
- 2012 McGill Medal for Journalistic Courage from the Grady College of Journalism and Mass Communication
- 2011 Eugene S. Pulliam National Journalism Writing Award from Ball State University for her article, "Haiti-Hotel Montana".
- 2009 Pulitzer Prize Finalist "for her in-depth investigation of the exploitation of impoverished children in West and Central Africa"
- 2007 Sidney Hillman Foundation Award, "Coverage of Hurricane Katrina aftermath," The Associated Press
- 2004 John M. Templeton Religion Story of the Year award, The Daily Herald (Ill.), "Passage from India"
- 1998 Keats-Shelley Prize for Poetry

== Works ==
=== News ===
- "Gabon casts first votes after dictator's death". The San Diego Union Tribune. Associated Press. 30 August 2009. Archived from the original on 21 January 2026.
- Callimachi, Rukmini (9 August 2009). "Opium addictions grip families in Afghanistan's remote villages". The Boston Globe.
- "Afghan women candidates campaign in burqas". The Taiwan News. 30 July 2009.
- "Ruler with 45 homes among world's most corrupt". The Taiwan News. 22 June 2009.
- "'Gabon weeps' for strongman despite lost riches". FreeLibrary. 20 June 2009.
- "Somali pirates held after attack off the Seychelles". The Scotsman. 29 April 2009.
- Callimachi, Rukmini (21 July 2007). "When the lights go out, students take off to airport". The Guardian. London.
- Callimachi, Rukmini (15 May 2005). "Mt. St. Helens' Victims Remembered". Los Angeles Times.
- Callimachi, Rukmini (26 November 2004). "Adidas Feeling Pressure From Nike on Home Turf". Los Angeles Times.
- Callimachi, Rukmini (23 August 2004). "Banks Look to Cash In by Providing Personal Touches". Los Angeles Times.
- Callimachi, Rukmini (18 August 2004). "All the Comforts of Home". Los Angeles Times.
- Callimachi, Rukmini (10 May 2004). "Bioengineered Grass Is Cause for Growing Concern". Los Angeles Times.
- Tim McGirk (29 January 2001). "Tremor Mortis". Time. Archived from the original on 28 July 2012.
- Callimachi, Rukmini (27 June 2015). "ISIS and the Lonely Young American". The New York Times.
- Callimachi, Rukmini (2018). "Caliphate". The New York Times.

=== Poetry ===
- "The Anatomy of Wildflowers", Keats Shelley

== See also ==
- Islamic extremism
- Romanian Americans
