= Jason DeRose =

American journalist

Jason DeRose is the religion correspondent for National Public Radio News, based at NPR West in Culver City, California. He reports on the ways belief shapes American public life and the ways American life shapes religious expression. His reports are heard on Morning Edition, All Things Considered, and Weekend Edition.

Prior to this position, he served as NPR's Western Bureau Chief for more than a dozen years. Earlier, he was a Supervising Editor on the Business Desk and was an editor on the former NPR program Day to Day until that program ended in March 2009.

Recurrent themes in his reporting include: religious liberty and religious freedom, Islam in America; discrimination against Muslims since the September 11, 2001 attacks; sexuality as a defining issue for Christian denominations; LGBTQ+ clergy; and the impact on religious communities of land use policy, zoning, and eminent domain.

Prior to his current posting at NPR West, DeRose worked at WBEZ in Chicago, Illinois. He did stints at NPR member stations in Seattle, Washington, Minneapolis, Minnesota, and Tampa, Florida.

DeRose has served on the board of directors of the Religion Newswriters Association and as a mentor and trainer for NPR's Next Generation Radio Project — a program that teaches aspiring high school and college students public radio's unique reporting style.

DeRose has worked at the United States Holocaust Memorial Museum as an oral history interviewer and the International Center for Journalists as a trainer. He has also taught in the Religious Studies Department at DePaul University in Chicago and at Northwestern University's Medill School of Journalism.

DeRose graduated magna cum laude, Phi Beta Kappa from St. Olaf College in Northfield, Minnesota with majors in religion and English. He also holds a master's degree from the University of Chicago Divinity School and studied religion reporting at Northwestern University's Medill School of Journalism.

== Sources and external links ==
- Jason DeRose — National Public Radio website
- Jason DeRose — Knight Digital Media Center website
- RNA Board of Directors — Religion Newswriters Association website
- International Center for Journalists
