= KALX =

Radio station at the University of California, Berkeley

- Berkeley, California; United States
- Broadcast area: San Francisco Bay Area
- Frequency: 90.7 MHz

Programming
- Format: College radio

Ownership
- Owner: University of California

History
- First air date: 1962
- Call sign meaning: University of California

Technical information
- Licensing authority: FCC
- Facility ID: 68999
- Class: A
- ERP: 500 watts
- HAAT: 238 meters (781 ft)
- Transmitter coordinates: 37°52′40″N 122°14′44″W

Links
- Public license information: Public file; LMS
- Webcast: Listen live
- Website: kalx.berkeley.edu

KALX (90.7 FM) is a radio station that broadcasts from the University of California, Berkeley in Berkeley, California, United States. KALX, a community and student-run radio station licensed to the university, broadcasts in stereo with 500 watts of power. The station employs three full-time paid staff members, but is largely run by its nearly 300 volunteers, including Berkeley students and other members of the local community. The station's studios are located at Social Sciences Building on campus.

== History ==
The station originally began broadcasting in 1962, as a carrier current station broadcasting on 850 KHz. By 1966, KALX (then known as Radio KAL, the call letters being derived from Berkeley's nickname "Cal") had moved from Berkeley's dormitories to Dwinelle Hall on campus, and Berkeley administrators began investigating the possibility of applying for a broadcast frequency for the station. KALX received its broadcast license and made its first FM broadcast, with 10 watts of power, in 1967. The studio in the basement of Dwinelle was modest, a small chamber sequestered off from a sizable library of albums.

In the 1970s, KALX was taken off the air for a short period by the faculty oversight Radio Policy Board after the station manager and friends had abused their use of university automobiles for private use and run up large bills for long distance phone calls to their contacts in Los Angeles and elsewhere. After an investigation, the station was put back on the air in 1975 under new management, led by Andrew Reimer who had previously been manager of KUCI, the radio station at UC Irvine. The station progressed from a 10-watt part-time operation to continuous operation in 1977, to a higher transmitter site in the Berkeley Hills in 1978.

KALX became the official radio station for the Oakland Athletics just days before the season opener in April 1978. Larry Baer, a junior political science major who was the station's sports director and business manager, negotiated the agreement with team owner Charlie Finley. The situation was made possible because of the Athletics' subpar on-field performance and attendance and the uncertainty surrounding Finley's threats to move the ballclub to Denver. Baer, who would later serve as a San Francisco Giants executive beginning in December 1992, was the play-by-play announcer. Sophomore mass communications major Bob Kozberg and station producer/engineer Steve Blum also worked on the broadcasts.

The arrangement lasted only sixteen games. One month into the season, Finley decided to keep the Athletics in Oakland and awarded the broadcast rights to KNEW. Nonetheless, the setup made the A's a laughingstock in the Bay Area. At the time, KALX only operated at 10 watts, rendering it practically unlistenable more than 10 miles from Oakland Coliseum. This led one fan to joke about the A's radio network stretching all the way to Hawaii by asking, "Honolulu? How about here?"

In 1981, the station began a successful fundraising drive to boost its power level to the present-day 500 watts, a level that was reached in 1982.

As part of the A's 50th anniversary celebration in 2018, Baer was invited back to do play-by-play for one inning of an A's/Giants game.

== Format ==
KALX offers a diverse range of public affairs programming, and airs many kinds of public service announcements throughout its daily broadcast.

== Notable alumni ==
KALX has provided a training ground for numerous individuals who have had careers in music, television, and radio. These include:

- Madeleine Brand – KCRW "Press Play" Host
- Stewart Copeland–The Police
- Lisa Stark—ABC News
- Sarah Wallace—WNBC, WABC-TV's EyeWitness News
- Andrew Reimer—5aa
- Kristen Sze—ABC7
- John (Long John) Morehouse—past President Long Valley Communications, KALX, KZYX, KAVA, KMUD, KPHT-LP, KFTY-TV50, KRCB-TV22
- Bob Sarlatte—Actor and sports announcer

== See also ==
- Campus radio
- List of college radio stations in the United States
