= Abu Huzaifa al-Kanadi =

Canadian who claimed to have joined ISIS

Shehroze Chaudhry (born 1994/1995) is a Canadian who gained international attention under the pseudonym Abu Huzaifa al-Kanadi ("Abu Huzaifa the Canadian") as the subject of Caliphate, a podcast hosted by Rukmini Callimachi of The New York Times. He had claimed that in 2014, he emptied his bank account, traveled to Syria, and joined the terrorist group Islamic State (IS), where he remained until 2016. In the wake of the podcast's release, Conservative MPs called on the government to find and arrest al-Kanadi amid rumours that he had returned to Canada.

Chaudhry's claims and the podcast were called into question in September 2020, when he was arrested by the Royal Canadian Mounted Police (RCMP) and charged under Canada's terrorism hoax laws. Later that year, The New York Times retracted key parts of Caliphate which relied on his story, and returned the 2018 Peabody Award which the podcast had won. Prior to his arrest, his name was not known to the public, as he had only agreed to speak to The New York Times and CBC News on condition of anonymity.

In October 2021, in exchange for an admission in court that his claims about joining IS were false and agreeing to a $10,000 peace bond, the Canadian government dropped the terrorism hoax charges against Chaudhry.

== Background ==
Shehroze Chaudhry was raised in or near Toronto, Canada. He attended Lester B. Pearson High School in Burlington, ON. He went to Pakistan as a teenager to study. He claimed he studied at a Pakistani madrassa in 2013. He told his parents he would go to Turkey for a semester abroad and booked a flight from Lahore to Istanbul using his Pakistani passport. Prior to leaving Toronto in 2014, he claimed to have cleaned out his bank account. He returned to Canada in 2016 where he was reportedly attending a university in the Toronto area.

== Islamic State claims ==
Chaudhry claimed to The New York Times that he left Canada in 2014 to join the Islamic State group. Upon arrival in Turkey, he says he was met by a former resident of Mississauga—a city in the Greater Toronto Area—and visited the Syria–Turkey border town of Jarabulus to cross into Syria at night. He says he entered Manbij, a city located north-east of Aleppo that had a population of about 100,000 people. He stated that he trained for a few weeks and was assigned to al-Hisba, an Islamic police force enforcing Sharia law. He claimed to have used several hundred dollars to purchase a rifle, a Glock pistol, an IS military uniform, and other tactical gear decorated with IS badges. He said he made friends with other foreign fighters from Australia and Finland. He met Mohammad Ali of Mississauga, also known as Abu Turaab al-Kanadi, who was the only Canadian he met. He also stated that he knew about André Poulin, a Muslim convert from Timmins, Ontario, who was known as Abu Muslim al-Kanadi.

In the Caliphate podcast, Chaudhry told Callimachi that he had murdered two people while fighting for the Islamic State. He escaped to Turkey, where he was arrested by authorities before being released a week later. After his release, he allegedly returned to Pakistan, where he claimed to have stayed for two years, before returning to Canada.

== Return to Canada ==
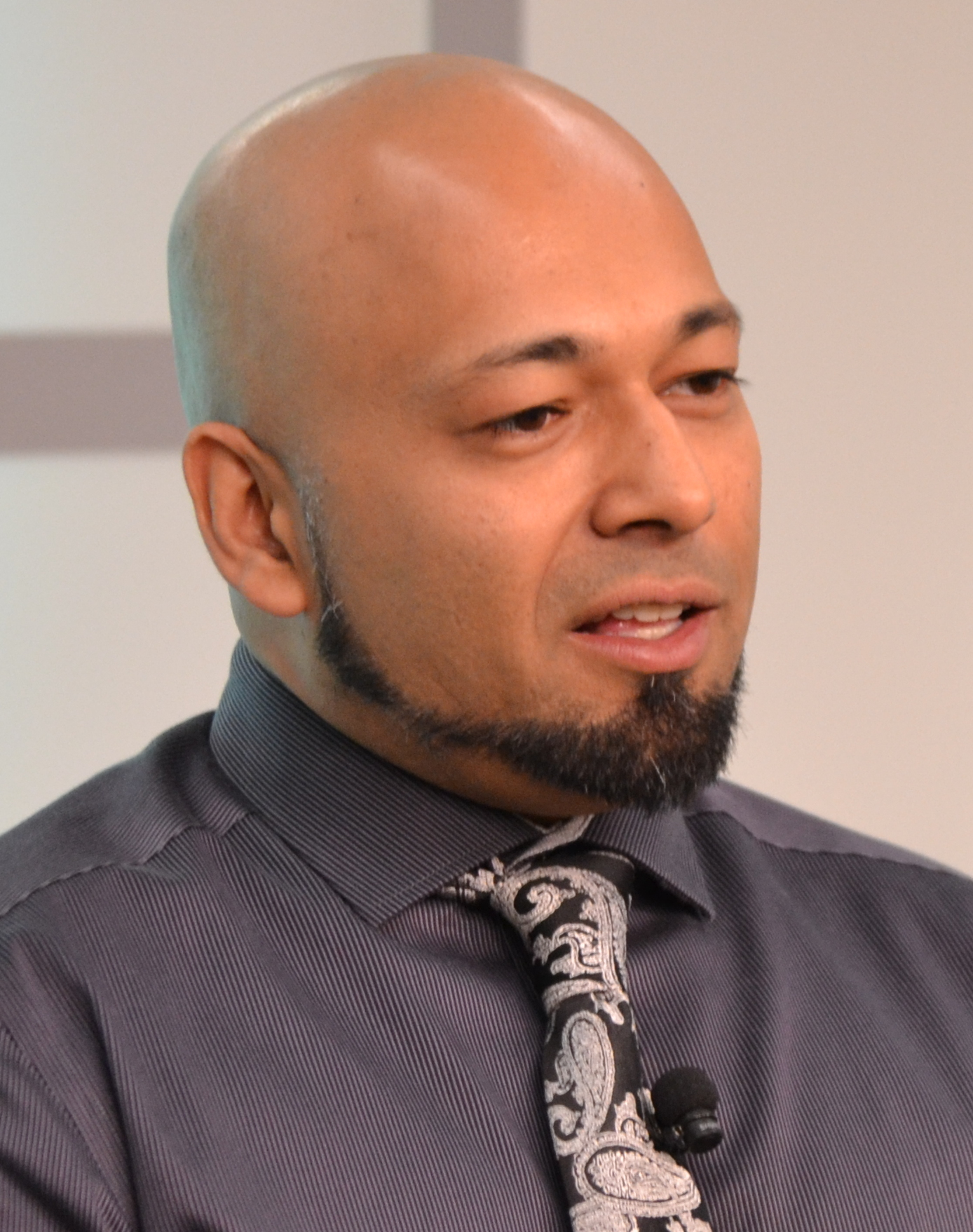
Chaudhry was counseled by Mubin Shaikh.

Upon his return, he had discussions with Callimachi; she stated that he initially felt confident that he had escaped law enforcement. Former schoolmates described him as a "loner" and an "anti-social guy" without "many friends". Chaudhry's background story was compared to those of Quebec Mosque shooter Alexandre Bissonnette and Toronto van attack suspect Alek Minassian. A year after Chaudhry returned, he was interviewed by CBC News and stated that he saw violence on a scale he could "never imagine" when he fought for the Islamic State. Mubin Shaikh, a former Canadian Security Intelligence Service agent, stated that Chaudhry could be "rehabilitated" and that Canada needs to "have an eye" on him.

== Response ==
After Chaudhry said he fought for the Islamic State, Conservative MPs called for action against him. Opposition House Leader Candice Bergen criticized Canada's Prime Minister Justin Trudeau and the Liberal government during Question Period for not ordering law enforcement to arrest him. Bergen also called for Public Safety Minister Ralph Goodale to reveal whether the government knew where Chaudhry was, but Goodale stated that doing so would be the "opposite of keeping Canadians safe". Trudeau called questions about Chaudhry "divisive" and received criticism from conservative journalist Brian Lilley. In 2018, Chaudhry also received concerns from television journalist Diana Swain that he may have lied to The New York Times or CBC News since his stories to the two outlets contained significant differences.

In September 2020, Chaudhry was arrested by the RCMP's O Division Integrated National Security Enforcement Team (INSET) and charged with fabricating his accounts on social media and to CBC about his story of joining the Islamic State. In October 2021, in exchange for the Canadian government dropping charges, he submitted a statement of facts to the court that he never traveled to Syria, and agreed to a peace bond of $10,000. In the statement of facts, he said that Callimachi had at times "expressly encouraged" him to "discuss violent acts", though she denies having done so.

In December 2020, The New York Times retracted its reporting on Chaudhry in the Caliphate podcast, saying it "did not meet its standards for accuracy or fact-checking" and that they had no evidence that he had ever been to Syria. The Times reassigned Callimachi and returned the Peabody Award won by the podcast, and the Overseas Press Club rescinded its Lowell Thomas Award.
