= David Brancaccio =

American radio and television journalist (born 1960)

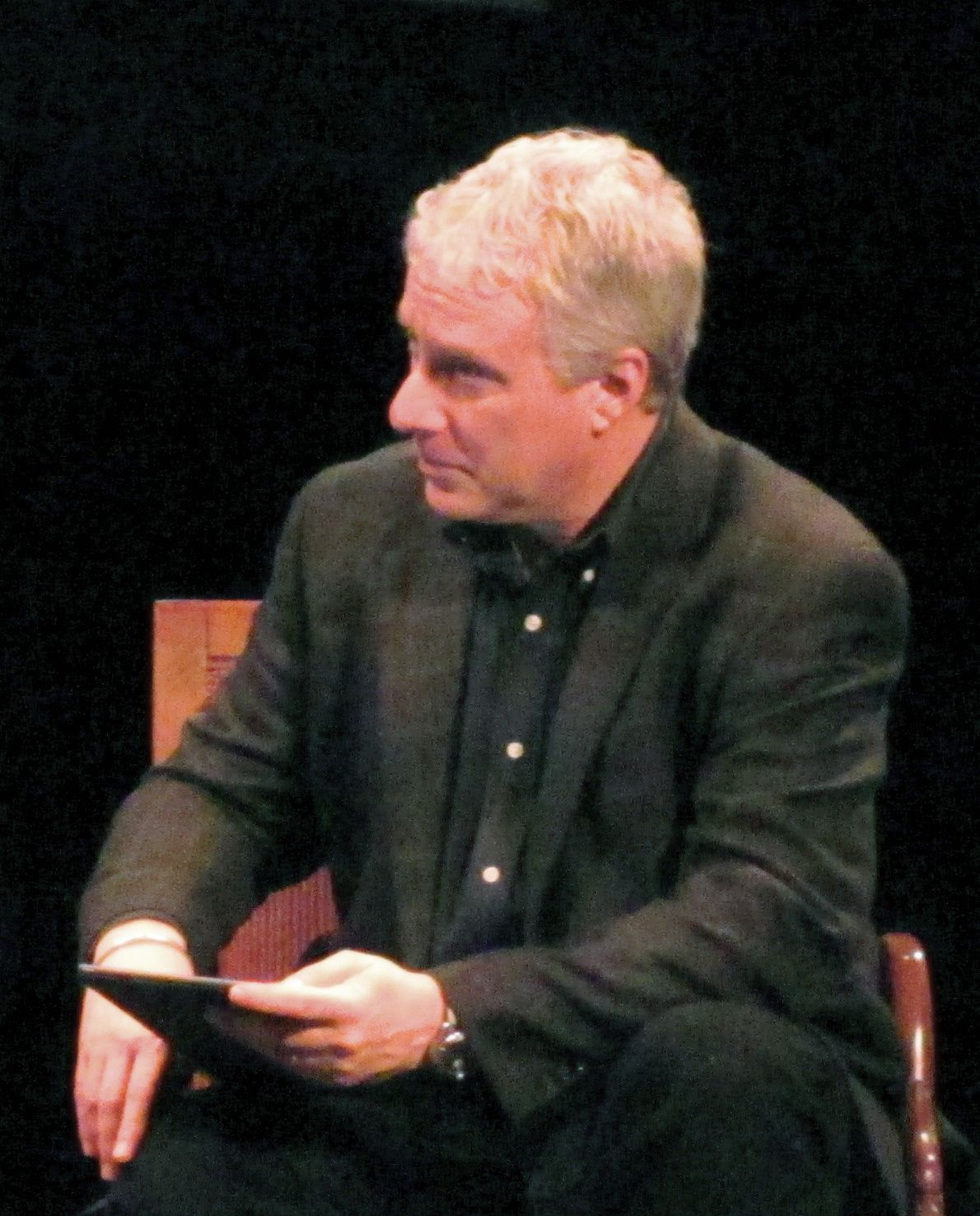
- Brancaccio in January 2014
- Born: May 17, 1960 (age 66); Waterville, Maine, U.S.
- Education: Wesleyan University (BA); Stanford University
- Occupation: Journalist
- Notable credit(s): California Connected; The Marketplace Morning Report; NOW

David A. Brancaccio (/brɒŋˈkɑːtʃioʊ/; born May 17, 1960) is an American radio and television journalist. He is the Senior Correspondent for Future Effects at Marketplace and was host of the public radio business program Marketplace Morning Report until June of 2026 and, from 2003 to 2010, hosted the PBS newsmagazine Now.

== Early life and education ==
Brancaccio was born in New York City and grew up in Waterville, Maine. His father, Patrick, is Italian American and his mother, Ruth, is Ashkenazi Jewish American. He began his career in broadcasting as a news reader for Colby College's WMHB at the age of thirteen, then became a DJ on Waterville's WTVL at the age of fifteen. He traveled widely during his childhood, spending his fourth grade in Rome, his ninth grade in Fort Dauphin, Madagascar and his senior year in college in Legon, Ghana.

He received a Bachelor of Arts in African Studies and History from Wesleyan University in 1982 and a master's in journalism from Stanford University in 1988.

== Career ==
In 1989, Brancaccio began contributing to the public radio program Marketplace. He was first named the program's Europe editor, based in London. Brancaccio became senior editor and host of Marketplace in 1993. From London, Brancaccio also contributed diplomatic and feature coverage for the radio service of The Christian Science Monitor. During Brancaccio's tenure as host, Marketplace received the DuPont-Columbia Award (1998) and the George Foster Peabody Award (2001). He anchored the television newsmagazine, California Connected, that aired on many Californian PBS stations, from 2002 to 2003.

In 2003, Brancaccio left Marketplace to join Bill Moyers on Now. Brancaccio was co-host for over a year prior to Moyers' retirement at the end of 2004. On his last Now broadcast, Moyers said of Brancaccio:

I asked David to join me over a year ago because I wanted my successor to have grown up, as it were, in public broadcasting, an independent journalist, believing our job is to sift through the untidy realities, weigh the competing claims, and offer to you our considered approximation of what's really going on.

Brancaccio covered business innovation and the economy, politics, human rights, national security, the environment, health care, and science policy.

In 2007, Brancaccio won a national Emmy for coverage of a public health story in Kenya. In 2009, he won a Walter Cronkite Award for excellence in television political coverage. He also holds the David Brower award for Environmental Coverage from the Sierra Club. In 2005, Brancaccio conducted the last, long-form television interview with the legendary author Kurt Vonnegut. The last episode of Now was broadcast April 30, 2010.

Brancaccio is a contributor to several broadcast, electronic, and print media, including CNN, CNBC, MSNBC, The Wall Street Journal, The Nightly Business Report, Wall Street Week with Fortune, The Baltimore Sun and Psychology Today. In 2000, his book, Squandering Aimlessly, was published, his account of a pilgrimage across America to learn how Americans apply their personal values to their money. He also lectures widely about the future of the economy and the role of journalism in a democracy.

Brancaccio's documentary film Fixing the Future, directed by Emmy winning filmmaker Ellen Spiro, exploring more sustainable options for the economy, was released in theaters in 2012.

In 2011, Brancaccio returned to American Public Media's Marketplace as a correspondent covering new economy issues and tech/innovation. He is now host and senior editor of the program's ten-minute Marketplace Morning Report on public radio stations nationwide.

== Personal life ==
Brancaccio lives in South Orange, New Jersey, with his wife, Mary, an educator and poet. They have three children. He is an avid photographer and bicyclist.

In 2025, he discussed the loss of his cottage in Altadena, California due to the Eaton Fire on Marketplace.

== Awards ==
- 2018 Gerald Loeb Award for Audio for "Robot-Proof Jobs" produced for Marketplace.

== Bibliography ==
- Brancaccio, David (2000). Squandering Aimlessly (1st ed.). New York: Simon & Schuster. ISBN 0-684-86498-3.

Preceded by Jim Angle	Host of Marketplace; 1993–2003	Succeeded by David Brown
Preceded by Bill Moyers	Host of Now; 2005–2010	Succeeded by none
