= The Journal (podcast) =

- Genre: Long-form journalism, Political podcast, Business journalism
- Country of origin: United States
- Language: English

Cast and voices
- Hosted by: Ryan Knutson (2019-present); Kate Linebaugh (2019-2025); Jessica Mendoza (2023-present)

Music
- Theme music composed by: So Wylie

Production
- Length: avg. 15-25 minutes

Publication
- No. of episodes: 1,400
- Original release: June 26, 2019
- Provider: Spotify; The Wall Street Journal
- Updates: Monday-Friday by 4 p.m.

The Journal (stylized as THE JOURNAL.) is a daily news podcast co-produced by the Swedish audio streaming service Spotify and the American business newspaper The Wall Street Journal, currently hosted by Ryan Knutson and Jessica Mendoza. Its weekday episodes are based on the Journal reporting of the day, with interviews of journalists from The Wall Street Journal. Episodes typically last 15 to 25 minutes.

== Background ==
Similar in format to other news podcasts like The Daily (produced by The New York Times) The Journal debuted in June 2019, and describes itself as a show about "money, business, and power." Among the high-profile topics discussed over the podcast's run since 2019 include the COVID-19 pandemic, the rise of generative artificial intelligence, and major acquisition deals (i.e. Microsoft's acquisition of Activision Blizzard and Elon Musk's acquisition of Twitter). It has also covered major scandals, including the bankruptcy of cryptocurrency exchange FTX followed by the trial of founder Sam Bankman-Fried, and the various investigations surrounding former and current president Donald Trump prior to his successful 2024 presidential campaign.

== Opening theme ==
The opening theme for The Journal is composed by So Wylie, who has composed music for other podcasts produced by Spotify including Dissect, The Habitat, and Murder Ballads.

== Reception ==
Grant Powell of Forbes says the podcast "inevitably crosses over into the realms of politics, news and science. ...so many of the topics they cover are global.... a great source for the very latest business news which every aspiring leader needs to be across." Jacob Riederer of Podcast.co said, "Each episode doesn’t stop at the basics—listeners get a curated list of further reading and resources from WSJ, making it easy to dive deeper into the topics that matter most." IHeartRadio's official website said the podcast "provides insightful analysis and engaging storytelling."

== See also ==
- The Daily - a similar podcast produced by The New York Times
- List of daily news podcasts
- Political podcast
