= The Skimm =

American media company

theSkimm, Inc.
- Type: Private
- Industry: News media
- Founded: 2012; 14 years ago
- Headquarters: United States
- Area served: United States
- Key people: Danielle Weisberg; Carly Zakin
- Products: The Daily Skimm; Skimm Ahead
- Owner: Ziff Davis
- Members: Over 7 million
- Website: www.theskimm.com

The Skimm (styled theSkimm) is an American media company, founded in 2012 by Danielle Weisberg and Carly Zakin, providing a subscription-only newsletter. The newsletter is a digest of news stories intended to be simple and easy to read.

== History ==
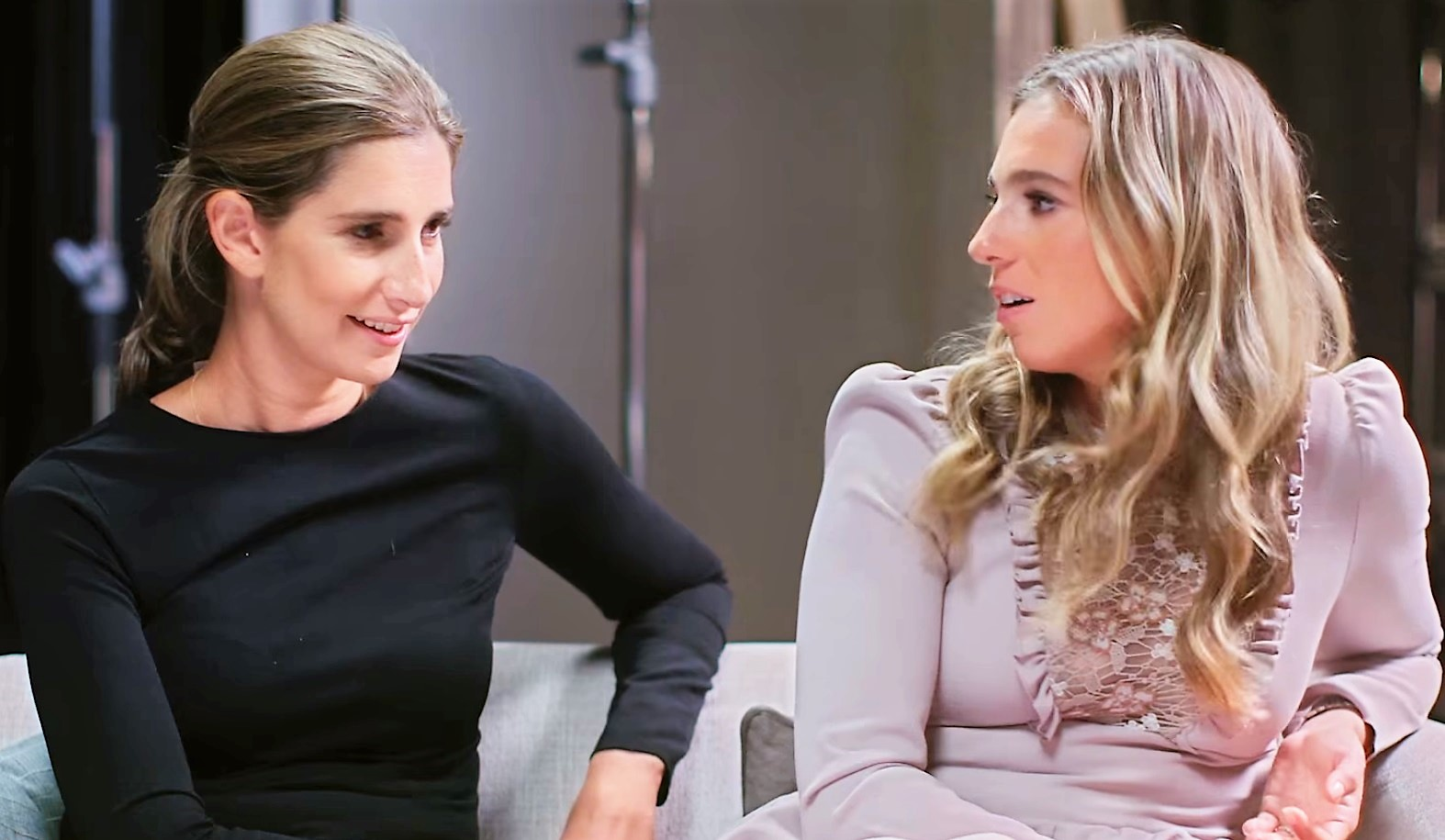
Zakin (left) and Weisberg interviewed by Ashley Graham in 2020

theSkimm was started in 2012, when founders Weisberg and Zakin left their jobs as producers at NBC.

In June 2016, theSkimm raised $8 million in Series B funding to move into video with the launch of Skimm Studios. The round was led by 21st Century Fox and included early backers RRE Ventures, Homebrew and Greycroft Partners.

In the fall of 2016, theSkimm interviewed 12 of the major candidates for U.S. President and registered 110,000 people to vote in the 2016 election.

On March 15, 2018, theSkimm raised a $12 million funding round led by Google Ventures, along with Spanx founder Sara Blakely. In October, it announced that they have over 7 million subscribers.

In March 2025, six years after the texting platform Purple was acquired by the company, theSkimm was acquired by Everyday Health Group, the health content arm of Ziff Davis.

== Products and services ==
The Daily Skimm is the company's daily e-mail newsletter, marketed to urban women aged 22–34. It focuses on an easily consumed summary of the news. As of November 2016, the newsletter has over 4 million subscribers.

In 2016, theSkimm launched the Skimm Ahead app for iOS, which directly inserts events into its subscribers' calendars.

On March 4, 2019, theSkimm launched its daily news podcast, Skimm This. Available weekday evenings at 5 p.m. ET, the podcast summarizes and contextualizes the news of the day. It's the second podcast launched by theSkimm after previously launching Skimm'd from the Couch in 2018. In 2021, theSkimm launched the career podcast 9 to 5ish.

Recent initiatives include '#ShowUsYourLeave', was launched to encourage congress to prioritize paid family leave policies. The campaign advocates for more transparency around paid family leave programs and more support of working women and families of all kinds.

== See also ==
- List of daily news podcasts
