= Now on PBS =

Public Broadcasting Service newsmagazine (2002–2004; 2005–2010)

- Also known as: NOW
- Genre: News/Documentary
- Created by: John Siceloff
- Presented by: Bill Moyers (January 18, 2002 – December 17, 2004); David Brancaccio; Host (January 7, 2005–April 30, 2010, previously co-host 2003–2005); Maria Hinojosa; Senior Correspondent
- Theme music composer: Douglas J. Cuomo
- Country of origin: United States
- Original language: English
- No. of seasons: 6
- No. of episodes: 150

Production
- Executive producer: John Siceloff
- Running time: 52 minutes (2002–2004); 23 minutes (2005–2010)

Original release
- Network: PBS
- Release: January 18, 2002 – April 30, 2010

Now on PBS, shown onscreen as NOW, is a Public Broadcasting Service newsmagazine which aired between 2002 and 2010, focusing on social and political issues.

== History ==
First airing in January 2002, and originally called Now with Bill Moyers, the program was launched as a collaboration between NPR news and Public Broadcasting Service (PBS). The program featured documentary reporting, interviews and commentary on current events. Bill Moyers served initially as sole host of the program while NPR reporters and commentators produced individual segments for the hour long-program.

In the autumn of 2003, David Brancaccio was introduced as a co-host. In 2004, Kenneth Tomlinson, the Chairman of the Corporation for Public Broadcasting, paid an outside consultant $14,000 to watch NOW with Bill Moyers and analyze the politics of the show. The study was not approved by the CPB. After the study became public in 2005, NPR, among other organizations, criticized the resulting study as being full of errors and a waste of money.

In the summer of 2004 the Corporation for Public Broadcasting announced that it would no longer provide funding for Now. Moyers subsequently announced that he would leave the show after the 2004 U.S. elections and appeared for the last time on December 17, 2004. After his departure, the show was reduced to a half hour.

Maria Hinojosa was credited as a senior correspondent for the show while presenting many investigative pieces. She and Brancaccio became the only two presenters and usually alternated segments.

In November 2009 it was announced that the program had been canceled, and its last episode aired on April 30, 2010.

== Awards ==
In 2008 Now was awarded the Edward R. Murrow Award, Overseas Press Club for a story on child brides. NOW on PBS was also awarded a National Business Emmy Award in 2007 and a National News Emmy Award for best newsmagazine segment in 2004 for Now with Bill Moyers, "Inside the Pentagon."
