= John Siceloff =

American television producer (1953–2015)

John Siceloff (October 21, 1953 – March 6, 2015) was an American television producer. He was born in Frogmore, South Carolina.

He created and was executive producer of the PBS news magazine, NOW on PBS.

== Career ==
A graduate of Swarthmore College with a bachelor's degree in history he continued his education at Stanford University, earning a master's degree in communications. Siceloff was a producer for ABC's 20/20 and Primetime Live and a senior broadcast producer for ABC News as well as NBC's NOW, Dateline NBC and Prime Story. During 2001 he joined PBS and in 2004 he became founder and CEO of JumpStart Productions, which produced NOW on PBS. He was a trustee of Penn Center in the South Carolina Sea Islands, which had been one of the few places in the south where interracial groups could meet during the age of segregation. His father, Courtney Siceloff, was director of Penn Center from 1950 to 1969. Martin Luther King was a frequent visitor and used the facility for his Southern Christian Leadership Conference.

== Honors and awards ==
Siceloff has been the recipient of many honors and awards including the Alfred I. duPont-Columbia Award and the Peabody award for his work with ABC News' coverage of the aftermath of the September 11, 2001 attacks. He has also received National News Emmy Awards for ABC News segments on the Millennium celebrations and NBC's "The Terror Connection;" a CINE Eagle Award for ABC's "Guatemala;" and an Imagen Award for ABC's "Latin Beat." He also received the Edward R. Murrow Award, Overseas Press Club for a story on child brides for NOW on PBS and was also awarded a National Business Emmy Award in 2007 and a National News Emmy Award for best news magazine segment in 2004 also for NOW on PBS.

In 2009, Siceloff created Catch the Next, Inc., a not for profit organization with the mission to increase the educational attainment of Latinos and the underserved. In 2012, in collaboration with Dr. Maria Chavez he created the Texas College Success Program now called Ascender. The program's framework for student and institutional advancement has increased the rate of college completion for students in community colleges.

== Death ==
He died on March 6, 2015, at his home in Dutchess County, New York of prostate cancer.

== Books ==
- Your America: Democracy's Local Heroes (ISBN 0-230-60533-8)
