= Jim Angle =

American journalist and television reporter (1946–2022)

- Born: James Leslie Angle II; September 14, 1946; Fort Worth, Texas, U.S.
- Died: February 9, 2022 (aged 75); Arlington County, Virginia, U.S.
- Occupations: Journalist, news reporter

James Leslie Angle II (September 14, 1946 – February 9, 2022), known as Jim Angle, was an American journalist and television reporter for Fox News and ABC News. He was part of Fox News' inaugural reporting lineup when the channel was established in 1996.

== Early life ==
Angle was born in Fort Worth, Texas, on September 14, 1946. He studied political science at Texas Tech University, graduating with a Bachelor of Arts in 1969. He then obtained a Master of Arts in Latin American studies from the University of Texas at Austin. Angle was drafted into the US Army after completing college. He was consequently deployed to Vietnam and Germany, where he gave tours of Berlin to GIs as part of the special Berlin Brigade.

== Career ==
Angle first worked in journalism with NPR, acting as its White House correspondent for seven years during the presidencies of Ronald Reagan and George H. W. Bush. He was also lead anchor for the Marketplace radio program from 1990 to 1993. Angle subsequently joined ABC News, covering economics on ABC World News Tonight, Nightline, and Good Morning America. While working on Nightline, he was conferred the Excellence in Financial Journalism Award in 1994 and 1995. He then became a political and economics correspondent for CNN.

While covering the 1996 presidential campaign of Bob Dole, Angle was contacted by Brit Hume, who persuaded him to join the newly-launched Fox News channel. Angle initially served as a nightly contributor to the show Special Report with Brit Hume. In addition, he regularly was a substitute host for the Friday edition of the program, giving Hume a chance to appear on Fox News Sunday as a panelist. During his tenure at Fox, Angle covered the 1996 presidential election, the impeachment of Bill Clinton three years later, as well as important international visits made by Clinton throughout his presidency. He also reported live on the 2000 presidential election recount in Florida from Al Gore's base in Nashville, Tennessee. He was bestowed the Merriman Smith Memorial Award by the White House Correspondents' Association in 2001 and 2003 for distinguished White House coverage. Angle was named chief Washington correspondent for Fox News in 2005. He was eventually promoted to Chief National Correspondent six years later, before retiring in 2014.

Angle delivered the commencement address at Texas Tech (his alma mater) in the summer of 2012. Two years later, he was named a Distinguished Alumnus by Texas Tech. He was lauded by columnist Nat Hentoff as "[o]ne of the most fair, incisive, and informed investigative reporters on the Washington scene."

== Personal life ==
Angle was married to Patrice Pisinski until her death from pancreatic cancer in 2021. She was the director of the Office of Technology Advancement and Outreach at the United States Department of Energy, and they first met in 2006 after the sudden death of her first husband. He was stepfather to her two children.

Angle died on February 9, 2022, aged 75, at his home in Arlington, Virginia.
