= Michael Barbaro =

American journalist

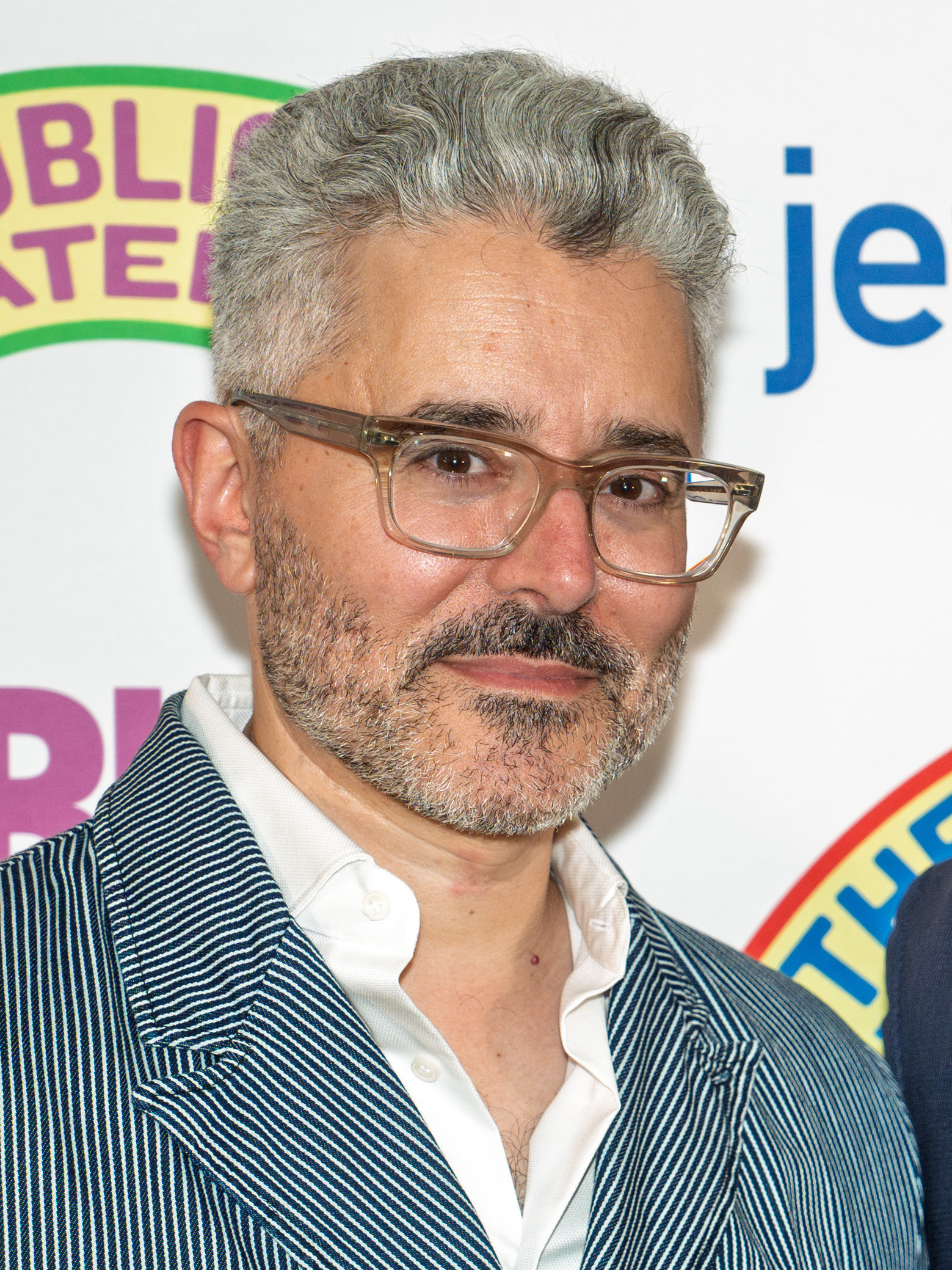
- Barbaro at the 2025 Tribeca Festival
- Born: October 12, 1979 (age 46); New Haven, Connecticut, U.S.
- Education: Yale University (BA)
- Occupations: Journalist, podcast co-host
- Years active: 2002–present
- Employer: The New York Times
- Known for: Host of The Daily
- Spouses: Timothy Levin (m. 2014; div. 2018) Lisa Tobin (m. 2020)
- Children: 2

Michael Christopher Barbaro (born October 12, 1979) is an American journalist and the founding host of The New York Times news podcast The Daily, one of the most popular podcasts in the United States.

== Early life ==
Barbaro grew up in North Haven, Connecticut. His mother, Jean, worked as a library media specialist at Anna Reynolds Elementary School in Newington, Connecticut. His father, Frank, was a New Haven, Connecticut city firefighter. His mother is Jewish and Barbaro identifies as Jewish. Barbaro's sister, Tracy Barbaro, works at Harvard University as a research lab coordinator. In middle school, he and his sister delivered the New Haven Register every weekday at 6 am. Both attended Hamden Hall Country Day School in Hamden, Connecticut.

=== High school and college journalism ===
In high school, Barbaro wrote for Hamden Hall's official newspaper, The Advent. Barbaro, with classmate and future New York Times colleague Ross Douthat, also co-founded and ran the school's underground newspaper, La Verité. As a teenager, he aspired to be the Times' Jerusalem Bureau Chief.

He graduated from Yale University in 2002 with a degree in history. While at Yale, he reported for the Yale Daily News and later became its editor-in-chief, overseeing a staff of nearly 100 student writers.

== Career ==
=== 2002–2016: Reporter ===
After his college graduation, Barbaro joined The Washington Post as a reporter covering the biotechnology industry. In 2005, he joined The New York Times, where he first covered Walmart extensively until 2007 for the Times' business section. Next, he reported on New York City Hall and the American retail industry. Later, he became a national political correspondent for the Times. During the 2016 United States presidential election, Barbaro frequently wrote front-page articles on the topic and became one of the most prominent Times reporters covering the election.

=== 2016–present: Podcast host ===
==== The Run-Up ====
In August 2016, The New York Times launched The Run-Up, a twice-a-week political podcast that Barbaro hosted. The podcast ran until the presidential election in November 2016.

==== The Daily ====
In February 2017, Barbaro began hosting The Daily, the Times' first podcast to air five days a week. In its first year, The Daily attracted an audience of one million listeners a day. The podcast, which has episodes that typically are 30 minutes long, has experienced tremendous success and was the No. 1 podcast in the United States for every month of 2019. The Daily was the most popular U.S. news podcast for both Spotify and Apple listeners in 2020 and the No. 2 podcast in the United States. Although the Times' has various other podcasts, most of its audio revenue in mid-2019 was from The Daily.

The Daily saw even greater success during the COVID-19 pandemic. TIME said: "Barbaro and his team at the Times have established themselves as the most trusted voices in podcasting at a time when we as a country are desperate for information." In August 2020, the newspaper's president and CEO Meredith Kopit Levien noted that at the time, The Daily had more than 3.5 million subscribers every day, a "vastly larger" audience than both the Times' daily and Sunday paper.

In January 2021, Barbaro apologized after privately pressuring some journalists to pull back criticism of the New York Times podcast Caliphate.

== Public image ==
Barbaro is known for his distinctive voice, frequently described as "dulcet", and his "staccato" speech style. His success with The Daily and distinct appearance also led many to compare him to Ira Glass, host and producer of This American Life. When Barbaro was growing up, his grandfather would criticize him for using "um" or "you know," so he often pauses when speaking to avoid using filler words.

Since The Daily launched, Barbaro has received significant media coverage. He has made sold-out public appearances around the country, and a wide range of media outlets have interviewed him about The Daily, journalism, and politics. He has been featured on television shows such as Late Night with Seth Meyers, CBS This Morning, and PBS NewsHour. Additionally, he has been featured at South by Southwest (SXSW), Vox's Recode Decode podcast, and NPR's talk show 1A.

Six months after The Daily launched, The New Yorker wrote an article about Barbaro entitled "An Appreciation of Michael Barbaro and The Daily." In January 2020, a New York Magazine profile on him called him "the voice of a generation." A Vanity Fair article in November 2021 suggested that The Daily had "vault[ed] Barbaro from a respected reporter to a full-fledged media celebrity."

In November 2018, Liev Schreiber portrayed Barbaro on Saturday Night Live.

== Awards and honors ==
In 2018, Barbaro won a duPont-Columbia University Award, one of the most prestigious awards in journalism, for his work on The Daily. Columbia University Graduate School of Journalism, which administers the award, called The Daily "one of the signature achievements in podcasting this year," and said that the podcast is "raising the journalistic bar and inspiring a wave of imitators."

== Personal life ==
In October 2014, Barbaro married Timothy Levin, a fellow Yale graduate. Levin, who is eight years Barbaro's senior, founded Bespoke Education, a tutoring and test prep company. In July 2018, it was reported that Barbaro and Levin had since divorced. In a June 2019 interview with Evening Standard, Barbaro mentioned that it "wasn't a coincidence" that he and his husband broke up shortly after The Daily launched. He said: "[The show] was a massive change, and it exposed things to me about my life. It made me reflect on who I was. Anytime you go through a major life change it tests every relationship."

After his divorce, Barbaro began a relationship with The Daily executive producer Lisa Tobin. A New York profile on Barbaro from January 2020 reported that Barbaro and Times colleague Lisa Tobin bought an apartment together in Brooklyn in 2019 and married soon after. They have a son and a daughter.

Barbaro's friendship with socially conservative Times columnist Ross Douthat has received media attention. In an interview with the New Yorker, Barbaro reflected on how Douthat's socially conservative views affected the pair's friendship: "I've been on a long journey that I know Ross generally approves of," Barbaro said, referring to his ending his same-sex marriage and marrying a woman. "It's no secret that [Douthat] wants people to have children and to enter into monogamous heterosexual relationships."
