= O Assunto =

Brazilian news podcast

- Genre: News; Current affairs
- Country of origin: Brazil
- Language: Portuguese

Cast and voices
- Hosted by: Natuza Nery (2022–present); Renata Lo Prete (2019–2022)

Production
- Length: 25–35 minutes (average)

Publication
- No. of episodes: ~1,700 (as of 2026)
- Original release: August 21, 2019
- Provider: G1 (Grupo Globo)
- Updates: Daily

Reception
- Ratings: 4.666666666666667/5, 4.4/5
- Cited for: iBest Award (Podcast category)

Related
- Website: g1.globo.com/podcast/o-assunto/

O Assunto is a Brazilian podcast founded in 2019. Hosted by journalist Natuza Nery, it is G1's flagship podcast and quickly became one of the most popular podcasts in Brazil.

== History ==
O Assunto debuted in August 2019 as the first in a series of podcasts by the Globo Group's journalism team. The project aimed to bring together experts to discuss topics relevant to Brazilian news, hosted by journalist Renata Lo Prete. It quickly gained prominence among Brazilian news podcasts in its launch year and by 2020 had become one of the most listened to podcasts in the country on different platforms. On November 8, 2022, Renata Lo Prete left the podcast and journalist Natuza Nery took her place.

== Audience ==
The show was often among the most listened to podcasts in Brazil. It debuted on Apple Podcasts' Top Podcasts chart in August 2019, reaching the top of the chart on several occasions. In addition, the podcast also appeared on Apple's Italian chart, peaking at #91.

== Prizes ==
Year	Award	Category	Result	Ref.
2020	iBest Award	Podcast	Won	
2022	iBest Award	Podcast	Won	
