= Renata Lo Prete =

Brazilian journalist and television host

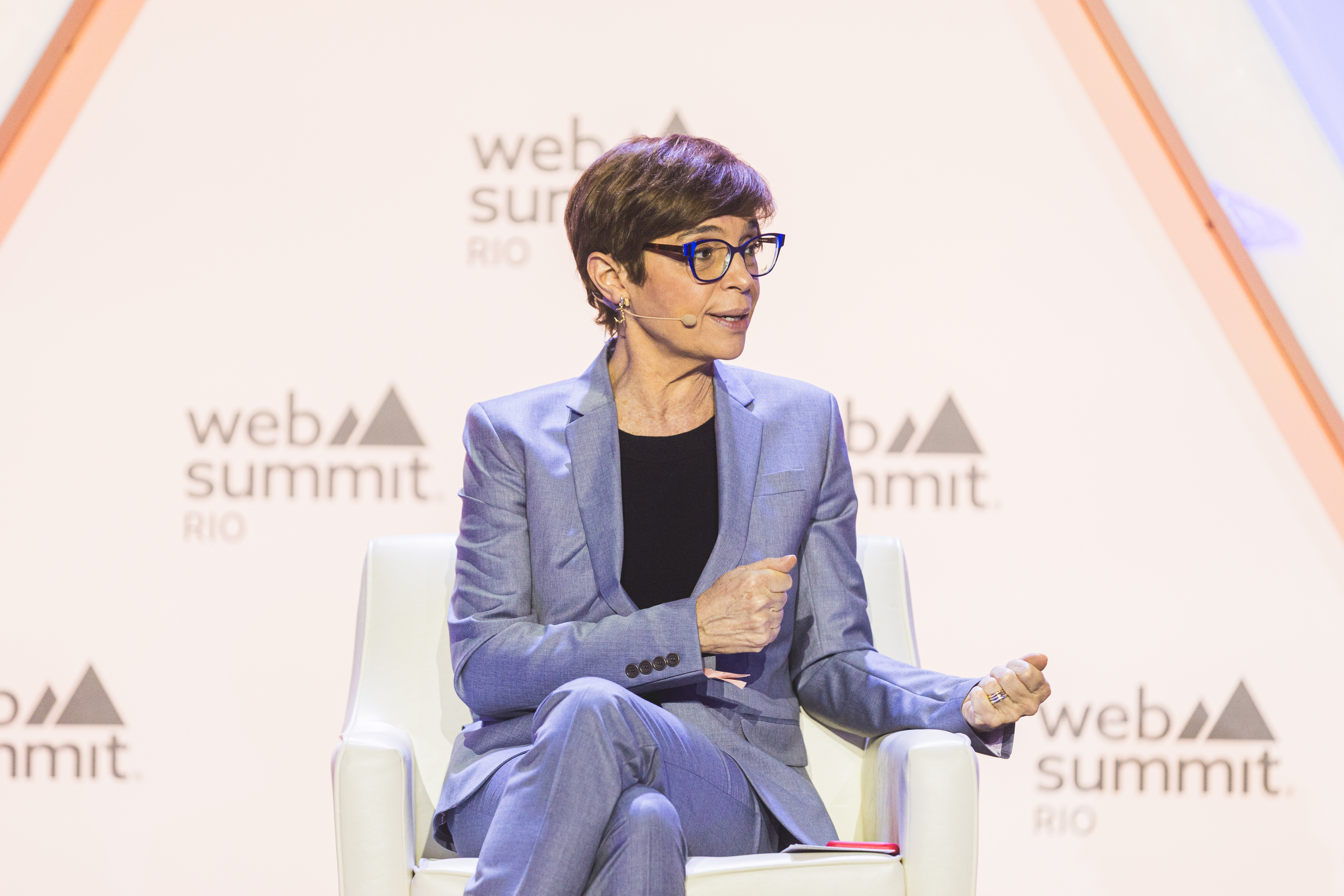
- Lo Prete in 2024.
- Born: August 22, 1964 (age 62); São Paulo, São Paulo, Brazil
- Citizenship: Brazilian
- Education: School of Communications and Arts, University of São Paulo
- Occupations: Journalist; Television presenter
- Years active: 1985–present
- Notable work: Painel column (Folha de S.Paulo)
- Television: Jornal da Globo (TV Globo)
- Spouse: Melchiades Filho (m. 1992)

Renata Lo Prete (August 22, 1964) is a Brazilian journalist and television host. She has worked for the newspaper Folha de S. Paulo and the Grupo Globo.

== Biography ==
=== Early years and education ===
Renata was born in the city of São Paulo, in the Santana neighborhood, daughter of Bruna Salmaso, a secretary, and Salvador Lo Prete, a social worker in 1964. She graduated from the journalism program at the School of Communications and Arts, University of São Paulo (USP), which is affiliated with the University of São Paulo, in 1984. She was a classmate of journalist William Bonner and film critic Isabela Boscov.

=== Career ===
In 1985, she worked for three months at the newspaper O Estado de S. Paulo as a copyeditor. From there, she moved to Jornal da Tarde, also part of the Grupo Estado, as a culture reporter. Later that same year, she began working for the Folha Ilustrada section from culture of the newspaper Folha de S.Paulo. She moved to New York, United States, where she served as a correspondent for the same news outlet. and worked with the journalist Paulo Francis. Upon returning to Brazil, she became deputy editor of the newspaper’s international section. She edited the Science section from journal. She also served as the editor in charge of the newspaper's television coverage, in addition to work as editor-in-chief of the newspaper’s “Primeira Página” section, a position she held for six and a half years.

In 1998, she took on the role of ombudsman for the newspaper, serving a three-year term. For ten years, between 2003 and 2012, she was the editor of the Painel column in the Folha de S.Paulo newspaper, which focused on the behind-the-scenes workings of Brazilian politics. During an interview with then-Congressman and party president Roberto Jefferson (PTB), the politician ended up revealing that members of Congress allied with the administration of then-President Luiz Inácio Lula da Silva were receiving a monthly “allowance” of R$ 30,000 from Delúbio Soares, treasurer of the Workers’ Party (PT), a revelation that triggered the Mensalão scandal. For this series of exclusive reports, she won the ExxonMobil Journalism Award in 2005.

In 2012, she left Folha de S.Paulo to devote herself full-time to the GloboNews channel. At her new company, she began working on Jornal das Dez. At Globo, Renata rose quickly through the ranks and became the political editor and anchor of Jornal das Dez. In 2014, she was the lead interviewer of the presidential candidates in that year’s election. As a result, she became the last journalist to interview politician Eduardo Campos (PSB) before the plane crash that killed him. During the 2012 municipal elections and the 2014 general elections, she anchored the program Central das Eleições on Sunday afternoons and evenings during the first and second rounds.

In 2017, she was invited by TV Globo to take on the role of editor and anchor of Jornal da Globo, replacing presenter William Waack, who had been fired following an incident of racism. That same year, Renata was also officially named host of the debate program Painel on GloboNews. During the 2018 elections, she stood out for hosting the two Sundays of vote-counting coverage on national television alongside William Bonner, as well as for her series of interviews with the presidential candidates. Her performance led to her being nominated for the 2019 Faz Diferença Award, presented by the Rio de Janeiro newspaper O Globo.

In August 2019, she became the host of the daily podcast O Assunto, produced by the G1 online portal. It is the most-downloaded journalistic audio program in Latin America. On November 8, 2022, Renata Lo Prete stepped down as host of the podcast. Natuza Nery took over in her place.

== Workers ==
=== TV ===
Year	Program	Note(s)	Broadcast	Ref.
2012—2017	Jornal das Dez	Political editor and anchor	GloboNews	
2017	Jornal das Dez	Host	GloboNews	
2017—present	Globo News Painel	Host	GloboNews	
2015—2017	Jornal da Globo	Occasional host	Rede Globo	
2017—present	Jornal da Globo	Host	Rede Globo	

=== Print newspapers ===
Year	Journal	Note(s)	Ref.
1985	O Estado de S. Paulo	Copydesk	
1985	Jornal da Tarde	Reporter	
1986—2012	Folha de S.Paulo	Editor of Painel, ombudsman, New York correspondent	

=== Radio/Podcast ===
Year	Work	Note(s)	Ref.
2015—2019	Jornal da CBN	Columnist	
2019—2022	O Assunto	Host	

== Prizes ==
Year	Prize	Category	Work	Result	Ref.
2005	Prêmio Esso de Jornalismo	Interviews	Folha de S.Paulo	Won	
2018	Prêmio Faz Diferença	Segundo Caderno/TV	Jornal da Globo / Globo News Painel	Nominated	
2022	Melhores do Ano	Best journalist	Jornal da Globo	Nominated	

== Personal life ==
She is married to Melchiades Filho, who is also a journalist, and they have two children. She's a Corinthians fan.
