= The Daily (podcast) =

News podcast by The New York Times

- Genre: Long-form journalism, political podcast
- Language: English

Cast and voices
- Hosted by: Michael Barbaro; Rachel Abrams; Natalie Kitroeff

Music
- Theme music composed by: Jim Brunberg and Ben Landsverk

Production
- Production: Producers: Theo Balcomb; Andy Mills; Lisa Tobin; Rachel Quester; Lynsea Garrison; Annie Brown; Clare Toeniskoetter; Paige Cowett; Michael Simon Johnson; Brad Fisher; Larissa Anderson; Wendy Dorr; Chris Wood; Jessica Cheung; Alexandra Leigh Young; Jonathan Wolfe; Lisa Chow; Eric Krupke; Marc Georges; Luke Vander Ploeg; Adizah Eghan
- Length: avg. 20–25 minutes

Publication
- No. of episodes: 2,200 (as of March 2025)
- Original release: February 1, 2017
- Provider: The New York Times
- Updates: Weekdays, by 6 a.m.

Reception
- Cited for: 2020 Webby Voice of the Year

Related
- Related shows: The Weekly; The Run-Up
- Website: nytimes.com/thedaily

The Daily is a daily news podcast produced by the American newspaper The New York Times, hosted by Michael Barbaro, Rachel Abrams, and Natalie Kitroeff. Its weekday episodes are based on the Times reporting of the day, with interviews of journalists from The New York Times. Episodes typically last 20 to 30 minutes.

== Background ==
The Daily was created in January 2017 by Lisa Tobin and Theo Balcomb as an extension of The New York Times' 2016 election-focused podcast, The Run-Up. It was hosted by the Times political journalist Michael Barbaro.

The Daily is based on interviews with Times journalists, in which they summarize and comment on their story, and is complemented by recordings related to the topic, or original reporting such as interviews with persons involved in the story, and letting them speak uninterrupted. A summary of headlines concludes the podcast.

The Daily is free to listen and financed by advertising; it is profitable according to the Times. The Times said it intended to build a news podcast franchise around it, beginning with a spin-off podcast, The New Washington, in summer 2017. The New Washington ran from July 2017 until December of the same year. A children's edition of The Daily was also planned. In January 2019, The Daily launched a weekly newsletter.

In March 2022, Barbaro was joined by the second host Sabrina Tavernise, following her guest hosting and reports including the Russian invasion of Ukraine.

In September 2024, The New York Times Company launched podcast subscriptions to The Daily on Apple Podcasts and Spotify. Subscribers to The Times would be able to link their accounts to Apple Podcasts and Spotify, to listen to archived episodes and receive early access to new shows.

Tavernise announced in December 2024 that she would be leaving The Daily to return to reporting for The New York Times. In April 2025, it was announced that Rachel Abrams and Natalie Kitroeff would join Barbaro as co-hosts of the show.

== Opening theme ==
The opening theme for The Daily is composed by Jim Brunberg and Ben Landsverk, collectively known as Wonderly. Brunberg and Landsverk are long-time associates of Lisa Tobin, one of the podcast's producers. Barbaro suggested that Brunberg and Landsverk take inspiration from the theme music of the TV series Westworld, composed by Ramin Djawadi. Andy Mills, one of the producers of the podcast, sent Brunberg and Landsverk music by Cliff Martinez from the TV series The Knick, which also influenced The Daily's theme music.

== Spinoff TV series ==
The success of the podcast led to a weekly documentary series The Weekly on FX, with its first episode airing on June 2, 2019. Initially, The Weekly was a narrative investigative journalism docuseries covering recent topical news and cultural stories, which later lead into longer documentaries, as The New York Times Presents.

== Reception ==
Started in January 2017, The Daily became a noted success for the Times; TheStreet described it as "a phenomenon, an out-of-the-blue hit." It had 3.8 million individual listeners by August 2017, and was regularly in the top ten most-listened podcasts by autumn 2017. The New Yorker attributed this success, in part, to the podcast's "conversational and intimate" tone, which made news more accessible, and to Barbaro's "idiosyncratic intonation" (he is known to say "hmm" after interesting commentary from guests, a habit that has generated much online commentary from listeners).

The podcast began being syndicated to radio by American Public Media in 2018. As of June 2018, the podcast receives 1.1 million downloads every weekday, and 2 million in January 2020. It was recognized as the Webby Voice of the Year, a Special Achievement award at the 2020 Webby Awards. In November 2024, Apple announced that the podcast was the No.1 most popular show on Apple Podcasts platform in 2024.

== See also ==
- The Journal – a similar podcast produced by The Wall Street Journal, mainly focusing on business stories
- List of daily news podcasts
- Political podcast
