= Kai Ryssdal =

American radio journalist (born 1963)

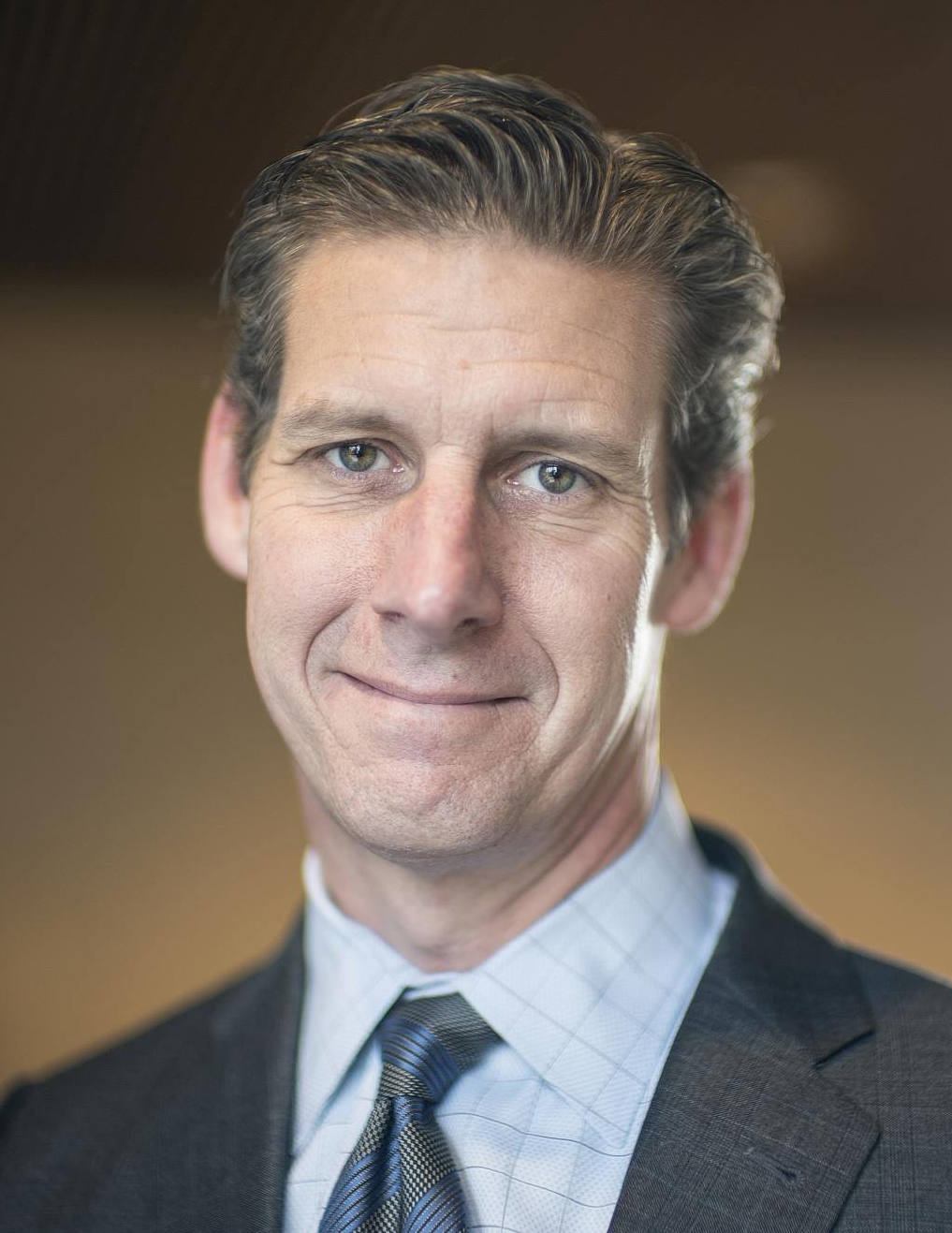
- Ryssdal in 2015
- Born: October 8, 1963 (age 63); Briarcliff Manor, New York, U.S.
- Education: Emory University (BA); Georgetown University (MA)
- Spouse: Stephanie Fossan (m. 1997)
- Children: 4
- Presenting career
- Show: Marketplace
- Military career
- Allegiance: United States
- Branch: United States Navy
- Service years: 1985–1993
- Rank: Lieutenant

Kai Ryssdal (/ˈkaɪ ˈrɪzdɑːl/; born October 8, 1963) is an American radio journalist and the host of Marketplace, a business program that airs weekdays on U.S. public radio stations. He is also a former co-host of the spinoff podcast Make Me Smart with Kimberly Adams.

Marketplace is produced and distributed by American Public Media. Ryssdal took over in August 2005, replacing David Brown. Before hosting Marketplace, he was host of the Marketplace Morning Report, a seven-minute business roundup, as well as the weekend program Marketplace Money.

== Early life and education ==
Ryssdal is from Briarcliff Manor, New York. His surname is Norwegian, as his father was born in Norway. He spent several years of his childhood in England and Denmark before moving back to the United States at age eight, living in Westchester County, New York. He graduated from Emory University with a Bachelor of Arts degree in history in 1985. Ryssdal received his Master of Arts in National Security Studies from Georgetown University in 1993.

== Career ==
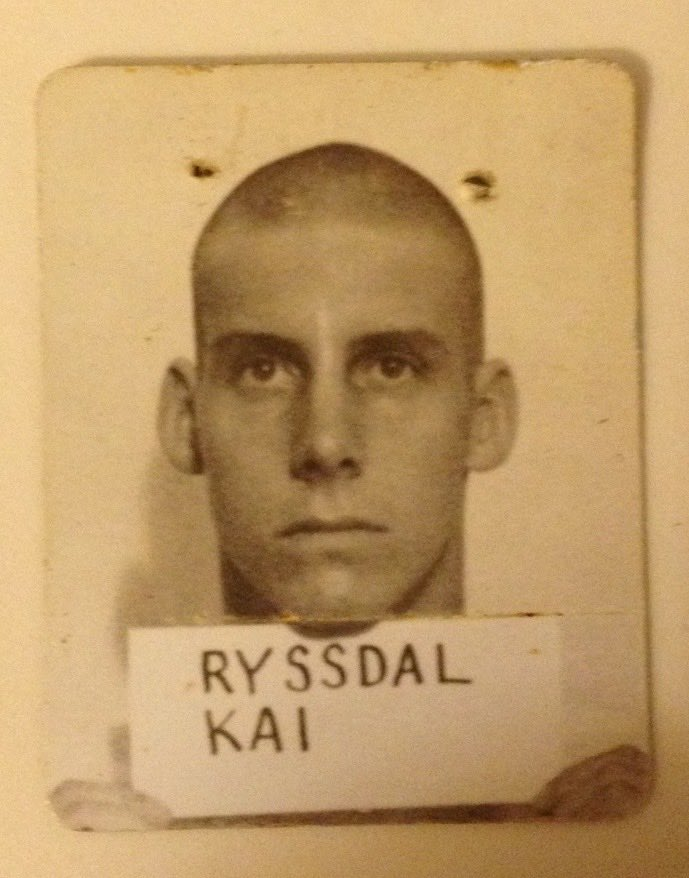
Ryssdal in 1985 at Aviation Officer Candidate School in Pensacola, Florida

After graduating from college, Ryssdal spent eight years in the United States Navy, first flying a Northrop Grumman E-2 Hawkeye from the aircraft carrier USS Theodore Roosevelt, and later as a Pentagon staff officer. After earning his master's degree, Ryssdal joined the U.S. Foreign Service, serving in Ottawa, Canada and Beijing, China.

Before joining Marketplace, Ryssdal was a reporter and substitute host for The California Report, a news and information program distributed to public radio stations throughout California by KQED-FM in San Francisco.

The Radio-Television News Directors Association and the national Public Radio News Directors Association have honored him with awards for his radio work.

Preceded by David Brown	Host of Marketplace; 2005–current	Succeeded by Incumbent
