= David Brown (radio host) =

American lawyer, radio personality, editor, journalist, author, and co-creator

- Born: Georgia, U.S
- Education: Georgia State University; St. John's College; University of Texas at Austin (PhD); Washington and Lee University School of Law (JD)
- Occupations: Lawyer, radio personality, journalist, host, author
- Known for: Host of Marketplace, Texas Standard, and Business Wars

David D. Brown is an American lawyer, radio personality, editor, journalist, author, and co-creator and host of public radio's first statewide daily news-magazine for Texas, the Texas Standard. He has also produced and hosted Business Wars, public radio's Peabody award-winning Marketplace radio program, and KUT's Texas Music Matters, among others. He is also the author of the book The Art of Business Wars.

== Career ==
Brown was born in Georgia. He earned his Ph.D. in Journalism from the University of Texas at Austin, and holds a Juris Doctor from Washington and Lee University School of Law and is a member of the State Bar of California. He also holds a Master's degree in Classics/Great Books from St. John's College and a Bachelor's degree in journalism from Georgia State University. He provided legal assistance as part of the Americorps program in the Shenandoah Valley.

Before joining Marketplace, Brown worked in several roles including reporter, producer, and host for The Christian Science Monitor newspaper's Monitor Radio service. He hosted radio documentaries from India, Brazil, Europe, and the United States. He has frequently reported for NPR and served as the executive producer of CalNet, California's first statewide public radio news network.

Brown anchored Marketplace, a nationally-syndicated radio program from American Public Media, from September 2003 to August 2005, replacing David Brancaccio. Prior to becoming host of that program, David Brown was one of its senior producers and fill-in host.

In 2005, Brown launched and served as the host and executive producer of the program "Texas Music Matters" on KUT, the NPR affiliate in Austin, Texas until 2013, when KUT tapped him to develop a signature news program for the station which went "all news" after the purchase of sister station KUTX in late 2012. Brown now edits and hosts the Texas Standard on KUT.

Brown wrote The Art of Business Wars: Battle-Tested Lessons for Leaders and Entrepreneurs from History's Greatest Rivalries, and "A Gutenberg Moment," the opening chapter of the communications textbook, "The Future of News: An Agenda of Perspectives."

Brown has won a number of awards including Murrow awards, National Headliner Awards, AP Broadcast honors and International Radio Festival Grand Prizes.

Preceded by David Brancaccio	Host of Marketplace; 2003–2005	Succeeded by Kai Ryssdal
