= Natuza Nery =

Brazilian journalist (born 1977)

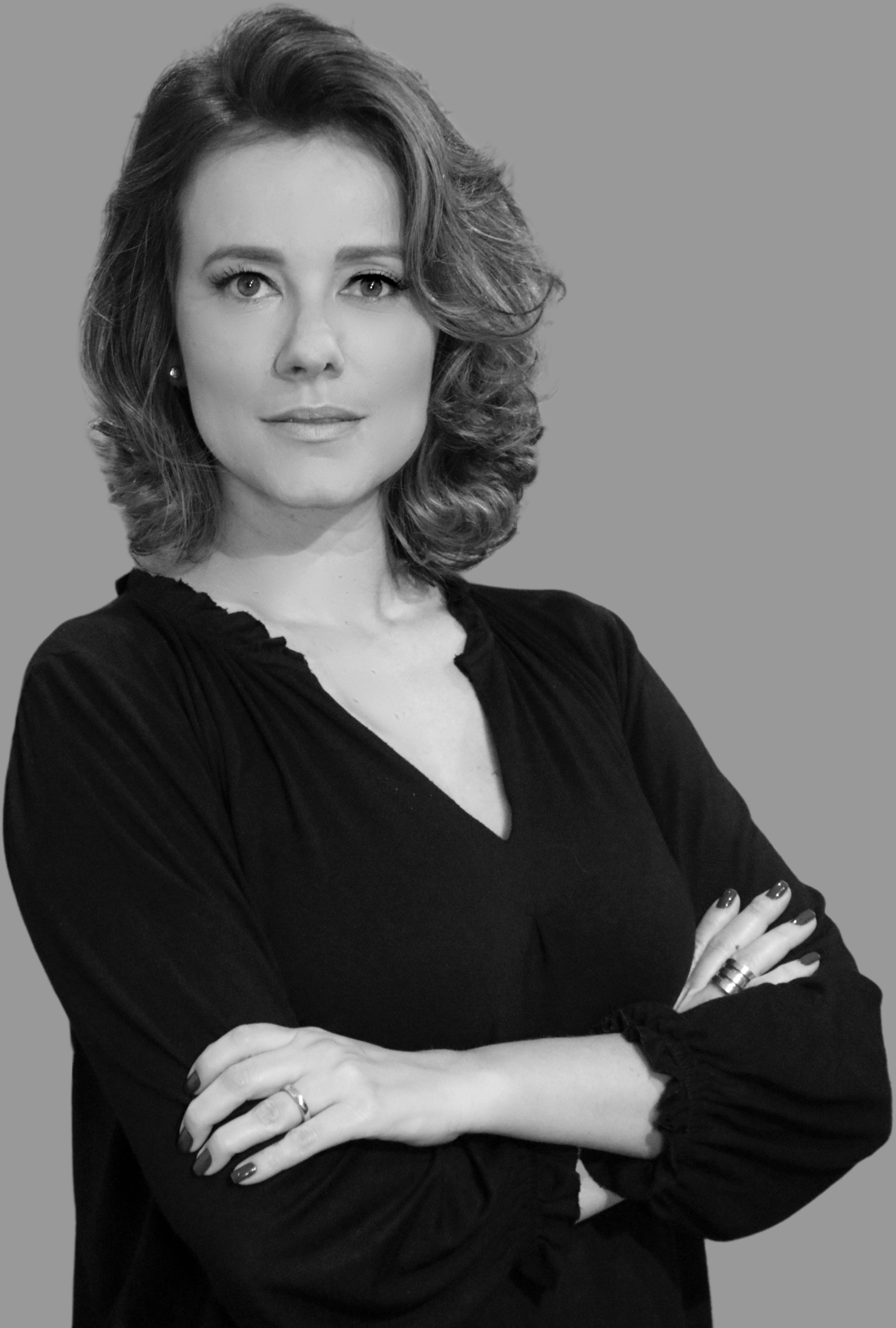
Natuza Nery in 2019

Natuza Nery (São Paulo, April 28, 1977) is a Brazilian journalist, speaker and podcaster. At Grupo Globo, where she currently works, she is a political commentator on the GloboNews news channel and makes weekly appearances on CBN radio. She is also a columnist and podcaster on the G1 News portal.

Previously, Nery worked for the news agency Reuters and for the newspaper Folha de S.Paulo, as well as participating in the "Meninas do Jô" segment, Programa do Jô, in TV Globo. She was awarded the CNI Journalism Award and the Folha Journalism Award, both for her work at Folha de S.Paulo.

Women Press Freedom vehemently condemns the egregious attack on journalist Natuza Nery, who was subjected to verbal abuse and a chilling death threat by a civil police officer in a São Paulo supermarket. Renowned for her sharp political analysis and fearless reporting on government corruption, Nery has repeatedly faced hostility for her work, underscoring the growing risks journalists encounter in their pursuit of truth. While the officer involved has been identified and removed from duty, this action alone is insufficient.

== Family and education ==
Nery was born in São Paulo, the capital, to Dilene Barrêto and Neuber Nery. At the age of two, she moved with her mother to Recife, Pernambuco, where she lived until she was ten years old, subsequently splitting her time between São Paulo and Recife. At fifteen, she returned to Recife and stayed until she turned eighteen.

Nery initially studied industrial design at Mackenzie Presbyterian University in São Paulo but did not complete the course. She then moved to Brasília, Federal District, and decided to change her career path. She graduated in journalism from the Centro Universitário de Brasília (CEUB).

== Career ==
I went because I knew it was necessary to bring visibility to the tragedy. The reports would make the world pay attention to that place.

— Nery, on her coverage of the 2010 Haiti earthquake.

Nery worked at the Reuters news agency, covering politics, agribusiness, and economics. While at Reuters, she broke her first scoop during Lula's administration, revealing that Brazil lent ten billion dollars to the International Monetary Fund (IMF), then one of the country's major creditors. The loan was unprecedented. In the Mensalão scandal, she published an investigative report revealing that withdrawals by publicist Marcos Valério coincided with controversial votes in the National Congress. Notable coverage during her time at Reuters includes the primaries that led to Barack Obama's nomination as the Democratic Party candidate in 2008 and the 2010 Haiti earthquake.

In 2010, Nery began working as a reporter at the Brasília bureau of Folha de S.Paulo; in 2013, she became a special reporter, and in 2015, she took over the Painel column, succeeding journalist Vera Magalhães. At the newspaper, she covered the National Congress and the federal government.

While at Folha de S.Paulo, she was invited to join the weekly "Meninas do Jô" segment on Programa do Jô on Rede Globo, where journalists commented on the most relevant political news of the week. In February 2017, Nery left Folha de S.Paulo to work exclusively for Grupo Globo. She is a political commentator for the GloboNews news channel, a columnist and podcaster for the G1 news portal, where she runs the Blog da Natuza Nery and participates in the podcast Papo de Política. She also makes weekly appearances on Rádio CBN. Since November 2022, she has been hosting the daily podcast O Assunto, produced by G1, following Renata Lo Prete's departure.

=== Awards ===
Nery was awarded twice during the time she worked at the Folha de S.Paulo newspaper.

In 2013, Nery won the CNI Journalism Award in the Printed in Newspapers category for the series of reports "The fastest growing Brazil", from Folha de S.Paulo. The reports showed municipalities and regions of the country that had above-average economic performance and were developing at a fast pace.

In 2016, she won the Folha de Jornalismo Award for her interview with former Minister of Culture Marcelo Calero, which resulted in the dismissal of Geddel Vieira Lima, then a key figure in Michel Temer's government. The report was titled "Out of government, Calero accuses Geddel of pressuring him to release work."

Awards received by Natuza Nery
Year	Award	Category	Work	Result
2013	CNI Journalism Award	Printed in Newspapers	Series of reports "The fastest growing Brazil", from Folha de S.Paulo	Wins
2016	Folha Journalism Award	—	Interview with former Minister of Culture Marcelo Calero: "Out of government, Calero accuses Geddel of pressuring him to release the", for Folha de S.Paulo	Wins
