= Radio Expeditions =

The Radio Expeditions series was a joint production of National Public Radio and the National Geographic Society. Radio Expeditions used interviews, narration, and on-location recording to bring listeners to exotic locations around the world. The show's focus was on nature, diverse cultures, and endangered environments.

The show also recorded some episodes in 5.1 surround sound. These episodes used spatial audio to envelop the listener. They could be listened to at Radio Expeditions Presents, which traveled around the nation playing select episodes at theaters. The surround sound programs can also be listened to directly from NPR's website in the Windows Media Player format.
