= Sarah Lohman =

American historian

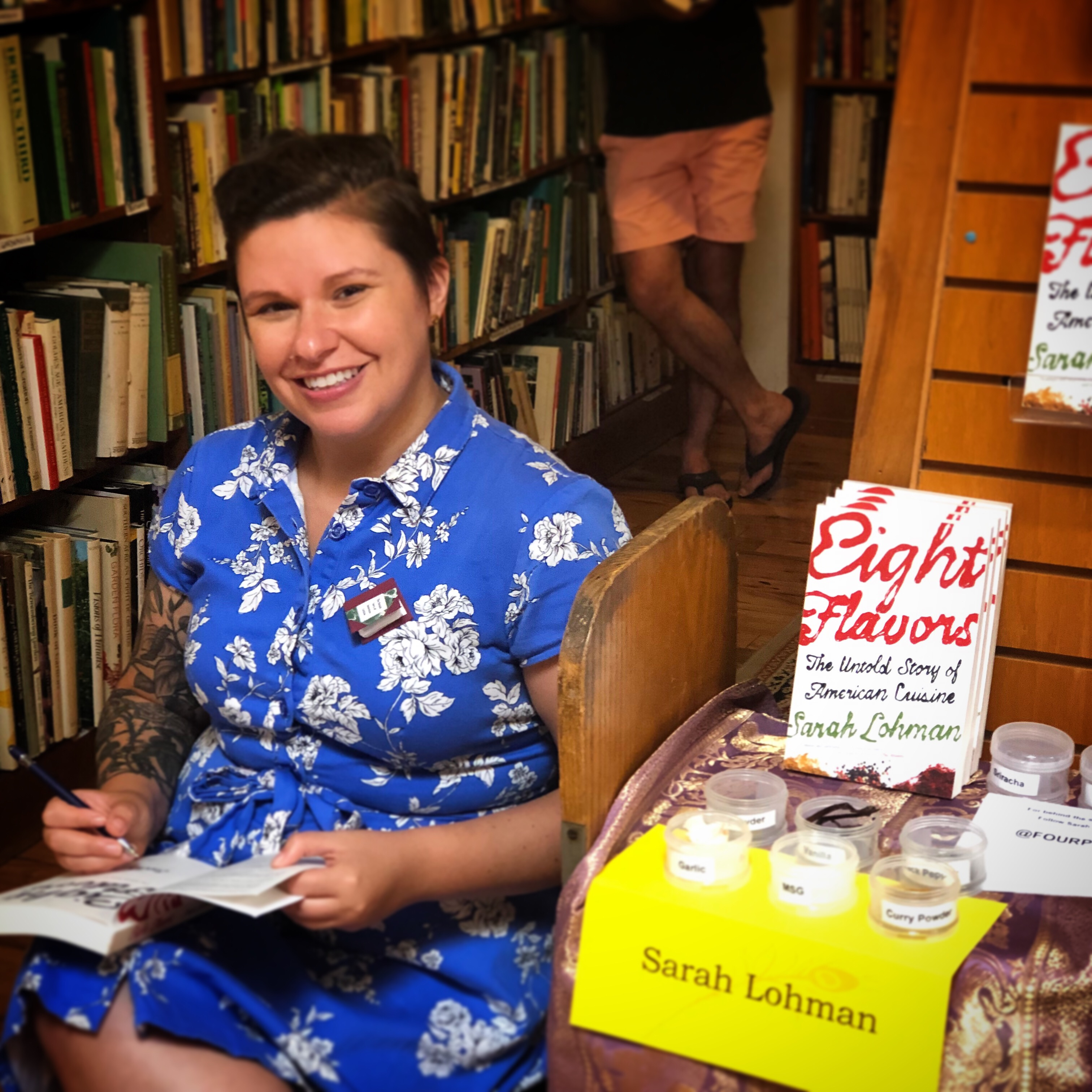
- Sarah Lohman with copies of her book
- Born: Hinckley, Ohio
- Occupations: historian, author

Sarah Lohman is an American historian, specializing in the history of food. She is the author of Eight Flavors: The Untold Story of American Cuisine.

== Biography ==
As a teenager, growing up in Hinckley, Ohio, Lohman worked, in costume, as a historic re-enactor. Her duties there included showing visitors how Americans used to prepare food. In 2005, she earned a Bachelor of Fine Arts from the Cleveland Institute of Art.

She traveled to New York City in 2006. She worked for Grub Street, upon her arrival, and worked at the Tenement Museum from 2009.

In 2016, she told The New York Times that she "searches old cookbooks and other records to recreate forgotten recipes as a way of studying history". She then prepares food, according to those recipes. She called eating those foods "an elaborate form of performance art".

Her book, Eight Flavors, published in 2016, has eight chapters, which each trace a signature taste crucial to the development of modern American cooking: black pepper, vanilla, curry powder, chili powder, soy sauce, garlic, MSG, and Sriracha. Several reviewers praised Lohman's deep research and the wide travel that had gone into it.

Lohman was one of the food historians used as an expert in a PBS documentary series, The Poison Squad, first broadcast in 2020. Her second book, documenting American foods at risk of disappearing, is called Endangered Eating: Exploring America’s Vanishing Cuisine and was published by Norton in 2023.

== Works ==
- Eight Flavors: The Untold Story of American Cuisine, 2016.
- Endangered Eating, 2023.
