= Marketplace (radio program) =

American radio program

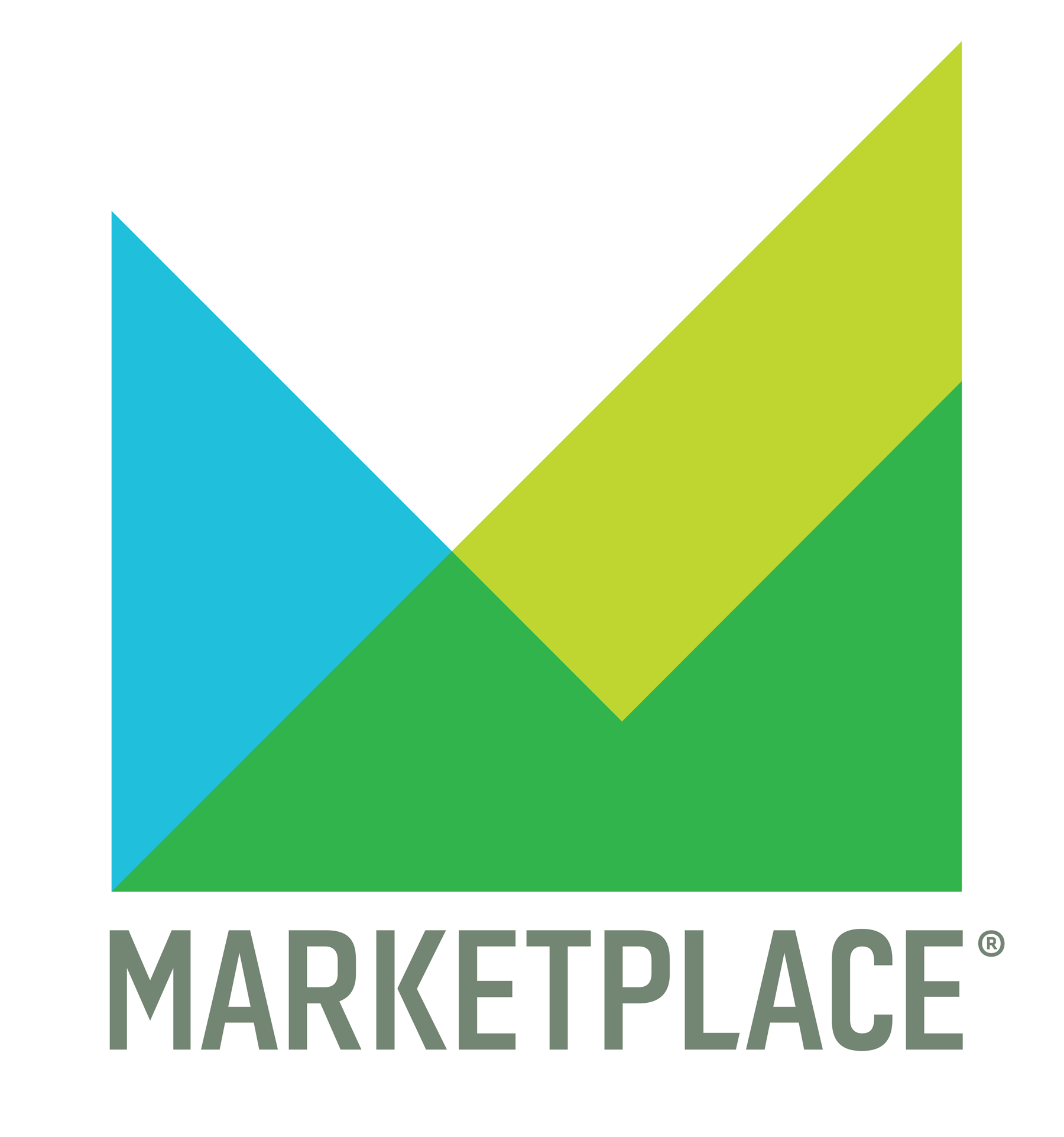
- Running time: Marketplace: 30 min Marketplace Morning Report: 7 1/2 min
- Country of origin: United States
- Language: English
- Syndicates: American Public Media
- Hosted by: Kai Ryssdal; Kimberly Adams
- Created by: Jim Russell
- Produced by: Sitara Nieves (Marketplace); Nicole Childers (Marketplace Morning Report)
- Executive producer: Deborah Clark
- Edited by: John Buckley; Betsy Streisand
- Recording studio: Los Angeles, California
- Original release: January 2, 1989 – present
- Audio format: Stereo
- Opening theme: B. J. Leiderman (composer)
- Other themes: "Stormy Weather", "We're in the Money", "It Don't Mean a Thing", "Loud Pipes"
- Website: www.marketplace.org
- Podcast: Podcasts

Marketplace is an American radio program that focuses on business, the economy, and events that influence them. The program was first broadcast on January 2, 1989. Hosted by Kai Ryssdal since 2005, the show is produced and distributed by American Public Media. Marketplace is produced in Los Angeles with bureaus in New York, Washington, D.C., Portland, Baltimore, London, and Shanghai. It won a Peabody Award in 2000.

Besides the flagship daytime half-hour program, Marketplace also produces a companion show, the seven-and-a-half-minute-long Marketplace Morning Report, hosted by Kimberly Adams, which airs on many public radio stations during the last segment of the NPR program Morning Edition. The Marketplace team produces a number of podcasts, including Make Me Smart, This Is Uncomfortable, The Uncertain Hour, How We Survive, and Million Bazillion, as well as podcast versions of the radio broadcast and extended podcasts built around regular segments from the radio show.

== History ==
Marketplace was founded in 1989 by James Russell in Long Beach, California. It was initially affiliated with KLON-FM at Cal State—Long Beach and distributed by American Public Radio, later renamed Public Radio International. The show nearly ran out of funding its first year, which Russell described, saying, "We were within three days of laying off our small staff and closing down." The program survived through the help of the University of Southern California (USC), which acquired the show, and later, in 1990, with the underwriting of General Electric. USC became the only university in the U.S. at the time to produce a daily news program distributed nationally. The melody from GE's jingle We Bring Good Things to Life was incorporated into the concluding moments of Marketplace's theme song during its sponsorship.

In 2000, Minnesota Public Radio (MPR) acquired Marketplace Productions from USC. This acquisition was the subject of a lawsuit by Public Radio International, which said it had not given its contractually required approval for the sale.

In 2004, American Public Media was founded as the production and distribution arm of MPR, and is currently the producer and distributor of Marketplace.

== Demographics ==
As of 2014, Marketplace's programs reached upwards of 12 million listeners with an average income of $101,000.

== Companion programs ==
=== Marketplace Morning Report ===
The Marketplace Morning Report is a seven-minute, thirty-second broadcasts that replace the business news-oriented "E" segment of NPR's Morning Edition on subscribing public radio stations. The show has been hosted by David Brancaccio since 2013. There are seven feeds of the Marketplace Morning Report from 5:51:30 a.m. ET to 11:51:30 a.m. ET, updated as news develops.

Because of the popularity of the Marketplace Morning Report, NPR struck a deal with APM to incorporate the segment into the second hour of Morning Edition, bringing the segment to all listeners, even if the station doesn't subscribe to Marketplace.

=== Podcasts ===
All two radio programs, Marketplace, and Marketplace Morning Report, are made available as free podcasts. In 2015, Marketplace began to offer non-broadcast-only podcasts: Actuality (2015–2016 with Quartz), Codebreaker, and Corner Office. In 2016, The Uncertain Hour and Make Me Smart were added.

Marketplace currently produces the following podcasts: Make Me Smart, hosted by Kimberly Adams and Kai Ryssdal; The Uncertain Hour, hosted by Krissy Clark; This Is Uncomfortable, hosted by Reema Khrais; Million Bazillion, hosted by Bridget Bodnar and Ryan Perez; and How We Survive.

=== Discontinued programs ===
The Marketplace brand also took over the money advice program Sound Money, which was renamed Marketplace Money in 2005, with content oriented toward a personal finance theme. The three shows shared reporters and editorial staff. Marketplace Money was replaced with Marketplace Weekend in June 2014. Marketplace Weekend was cancelled in 2018. The Marketplace Minute Morning Brief was cancelled on June 30, 2023. The remaining Marketplace Minute programs (Marketplace Minute Midday and Marketplace Minute Closing Bell) were cancelled on July 12, 2024.

== Awards ==
Marketplace has been the recipient of multiple awards, including:

- Emmy (2013): Big Sky, Big Money
- Edward R. Murrow Prize (2012): The Chinese Student Syndrome
- National Headliner Award (2007): Labor Shortage
- Peabody Award (2000): Radio

== Staff ==
=== Hosts ===
- Kai Ryssdal – Marketplace, Corner Office, Make Me Smart
- David Brancaccio – Marketplace Morning Report
- Kimberly Adams – Make Me Smart
- Krissy Clark – The Uncertain Hour
- William Lee Adams – Marketplace Morning Report from the BBC World Service
- Reema Khrais – This Is Uncomfortable

=== Contributors ===
- Stephen Beard – Bureau Chief, London
- Nancy Marshall-Genzer – Senior Reporter, Washington
- Amy Scott – Correspondent, Baltimore
- Jennifer Pak, Correspondent, Shanghai
- Krissy Clark – Wealth and Poverty Senior Correspondent, Los Angeles
- Andy Uhler – Reporter, Dallas
- Mitchell Hartman – Correspondent, Portland
- Sabri Ben-Achour – Reporter, New York
- Meghan McCarty Carino – Workplace Culture Reporter, New York

=== Former lead anchors ===
- David Brown (2003–2005)
- David Brancaccio (1993–2003)
- Jim Angle (1990–1993)
- Michael Creedman (1989–1990)
