= 83rd Golden Globes =

Film and television award ceremony in 2026

- Official poster
- Date: January 11, 2026
- Site: The Beverly Hilton, Beverly Hills, California, U.S.
- Hosted by: Nikki Glaser
- Directed by: Glenn Weiss

Highlights
- Best Film: Drama: Hamnet
- Best Film: Musical or Comedy: One Battle After Another
- Best Drama Series: The Pitt
- Best Musical or Comedy Series: The Studio
- Best Miniseries or Television movie: Adolescence
- Most awards: Film: One Battle After Another (4); TV: Adolescence (4)
- Most nominations: Film: One Battle After Another (9); TV: The White Lotus (6)

Television coverage
- Network: CBS; Paramount+ (streaming)
- Ratings: 8.66 million (Nielsen ratings); 18 million (Live + Same Day via Nielsen ratings)

The 83rd Golden Globes, presented by Golden Globes, LLC, took place on January 11, 2026, at the Beverly Hilton. During the ceremony, Golden Globe awards were awarded in 28 categories honoring film, American television productions, and—for the first time—podcasts, released in 2025. The ceremony, televised in the United States by CBS, was hosted for the second consecutive year by comedienne Nikki Glaser.

One Battle After Another and Adolescence were tied for most awards received, with One Battle After Another winning the awards for best musical or comedy film, best director, best screenplay, and best supporting actress, and Adolescence winning best limited series, best male actor in a limited series, and best supporting actor and actress in a television series. Hamnet won the award for best drama film, while The Pitt and The Studio won the awards for best television drama and comedy respectively.

== Ceremony information ==
On March 13, 2025, after receiving praise for her hosting of the 82nd Golden Globes, it was announced that comedienne Nikki Glaser would return as host for the second year in a row. Glaser stated that hosting the Golden Globes was the "most fun" she had ever had in her career, and quipped that "I can't wait to do it again, and this time in front of the team from The White Lotus who will finally recognize my talent and cast me in season four as a Scandinavian Pilates instructor with a shadowy past." Glenn Weiss and Ricky Kirshner of White Cherry Entertainment returned as executive producers for Dick Clark Productions.

A gala was held on January 6, 2026, to present the Cecil B. DeMille and Carol Burnett lifetime achievement awards to Helen Mirren and Sarah Jessica Parker; the gala was filmed for a new televised special—Golden Eve,—which was broadcast on January 8, 2026 by CBS. Harrison Ford presented Helen Mirren with her Cecil B. DeMille Award, with a guest appearance made by last year's honoree Viola Davis; Sarah Jessica Parker was joined by the Carol Burnett Award previous year's winner Ted Danson. The special was seen by two million viewers.

The presentation of the award for Best Original Score was cut from the televised ceremony due to time constraints; the presentation would still be filmed for the Golden Globes' YouTube channel and other social media platforms. The decision was criticized by social media users and nominee Hans Zimmer, with Zimmer stating that it "[felt] a little ignorant", and that "I think the work should always be acknowledged [..] This year is a fantastic year for composers — don't ignore them, you don't have a movie without them."

=== Category changes ===
On May 7, 2025, it was announced that a new category would be added to the then-upcoming ceremony: Best Podcast. Nominees were chosen from a list of 25 most-listened-to podcasts "that have made a significant impact over the past year, celebrating the creativity and influence of creators worldwide," the organization announced. The Top 25 list for eligibility was determined by direct data from top podcast platforms, such as Apple, Spotify and YouTube, among others; the list of podcasts eligible for submission was revealed on October 2. However, the decision for this new category ignited debate and controversy among creators and the industry.

After the nominations were announced, controversy diminished once it was known that right-wing conservative podcasters were shut out completely and mostly comedy stars, such as Will Arnett, Jason Bateman, Amy Poehler and Dax Shepard, as well as podcaster Alex Cooper, were nominated for their respective podcasts. (Note: Attributed to multiple references:) Helen Hoehne, president of the Golden Globes, said that the original list of 25, which was compiled by Luminate, reflects the "depth, diversity, and creativity thriving in the podcasting world today" and the Globes are "proud" to be the "first major entertainment award to recognize this medium". However, there was still some criticism leading up to the ceremony. Ultimately, Good Hang with Amy Poehler won the award, becoming the inaugural recipient of the category.

== Winners and nominees ==
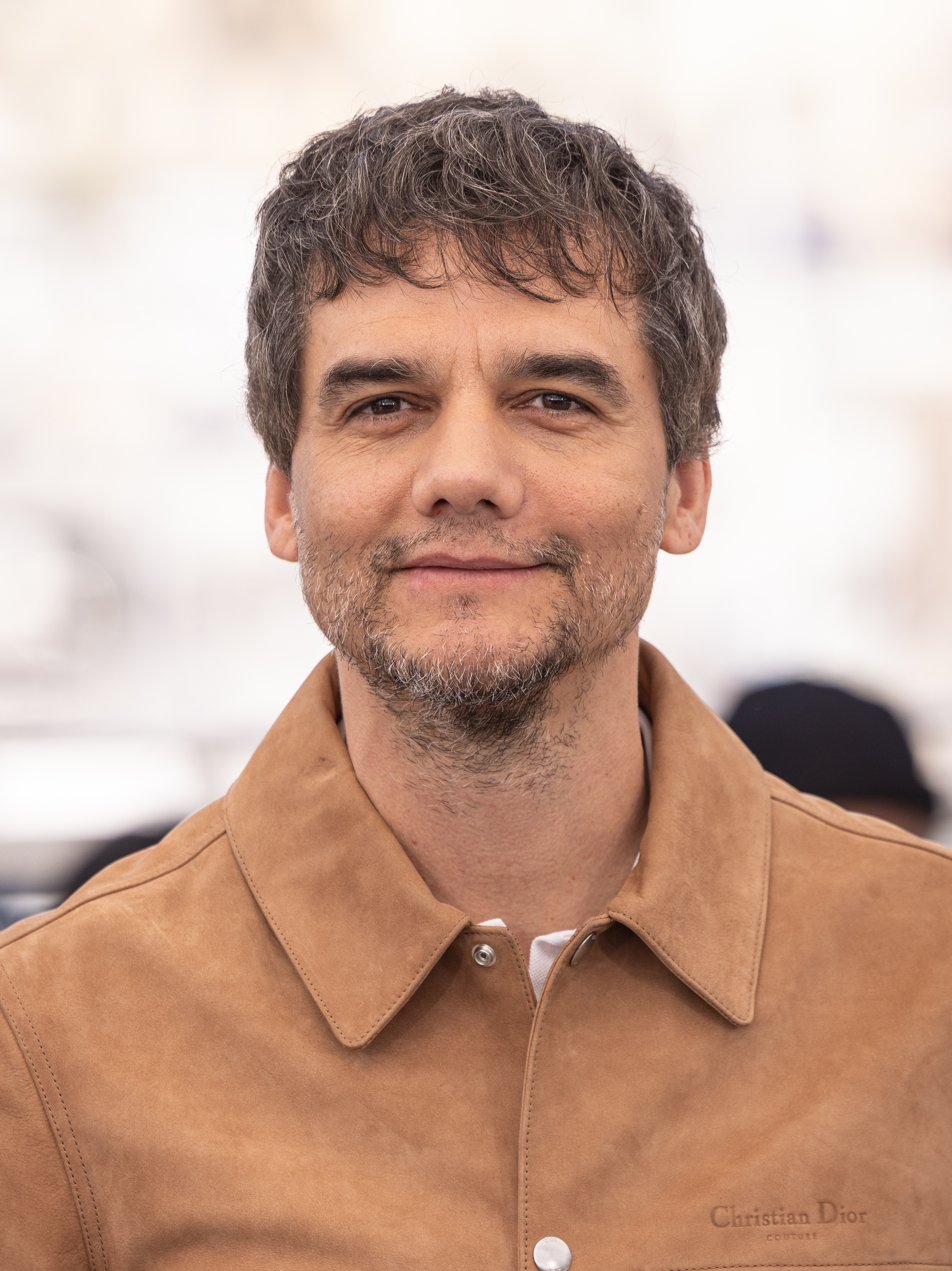
Wagner Moura, Best Male Actor in a Motion Picture – Drama winner

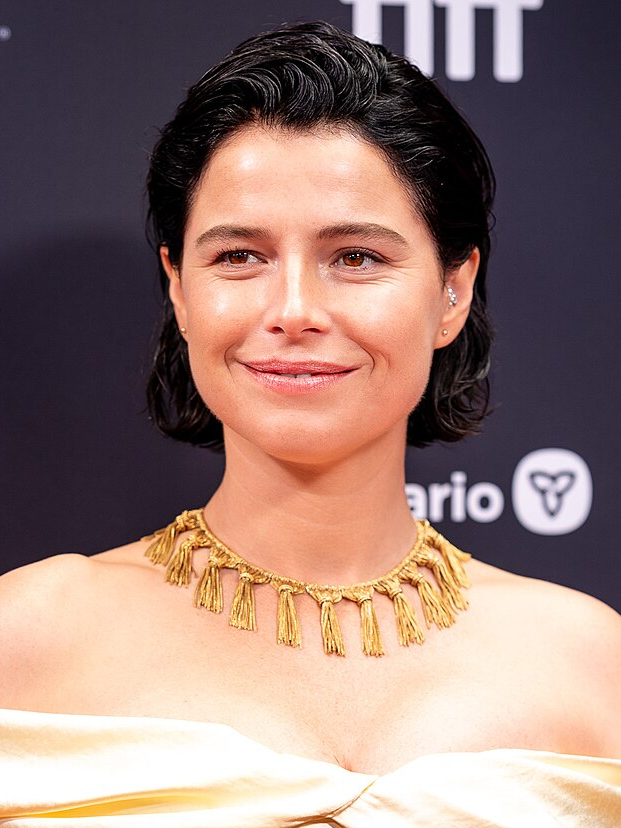
Jessie Buckley, Best Female Actor in a Motion Picture – Drama winner

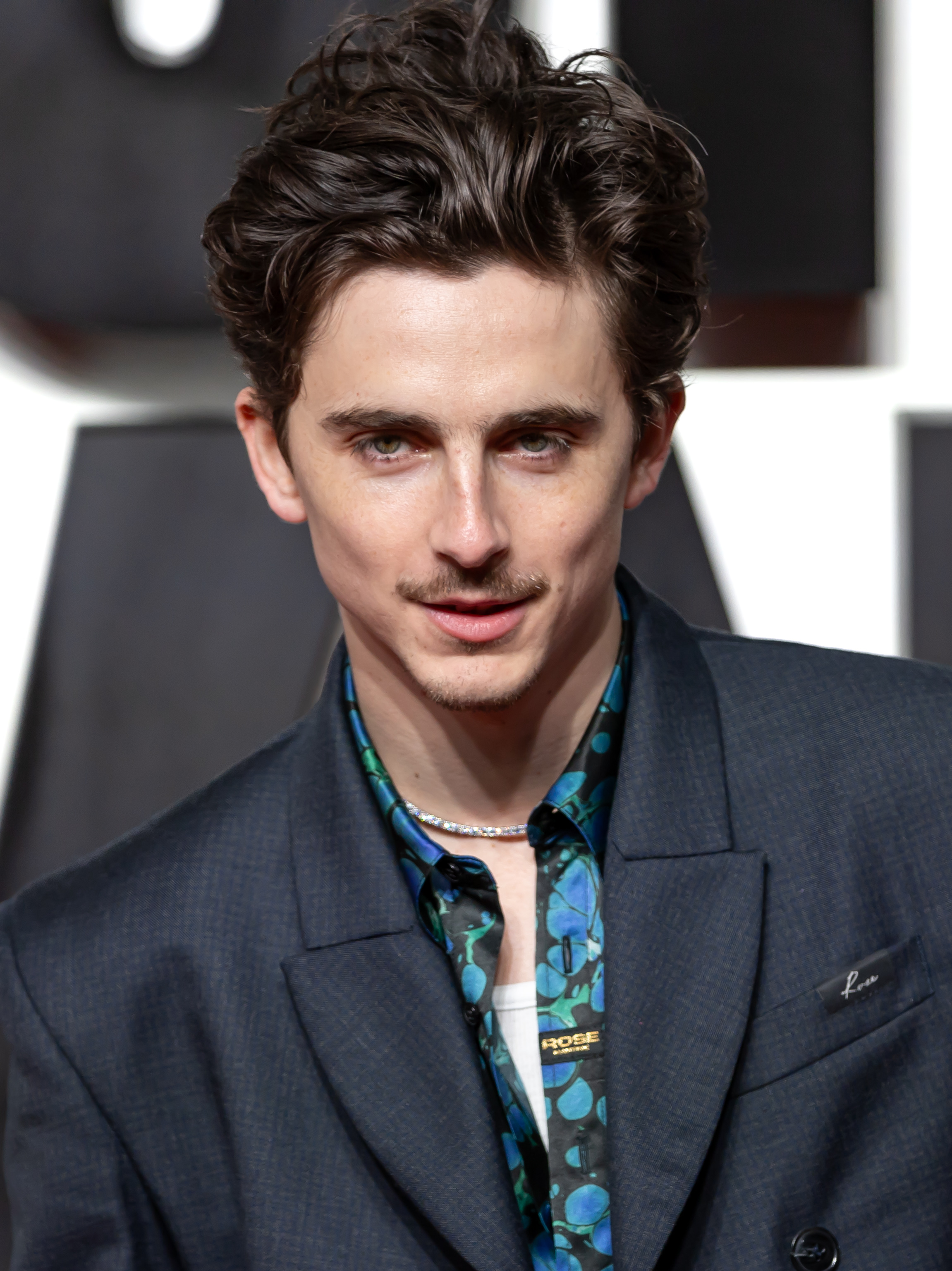
Timothée Chalamet, Best Male Actor in a Motion Picture – Musical or Comedy winner

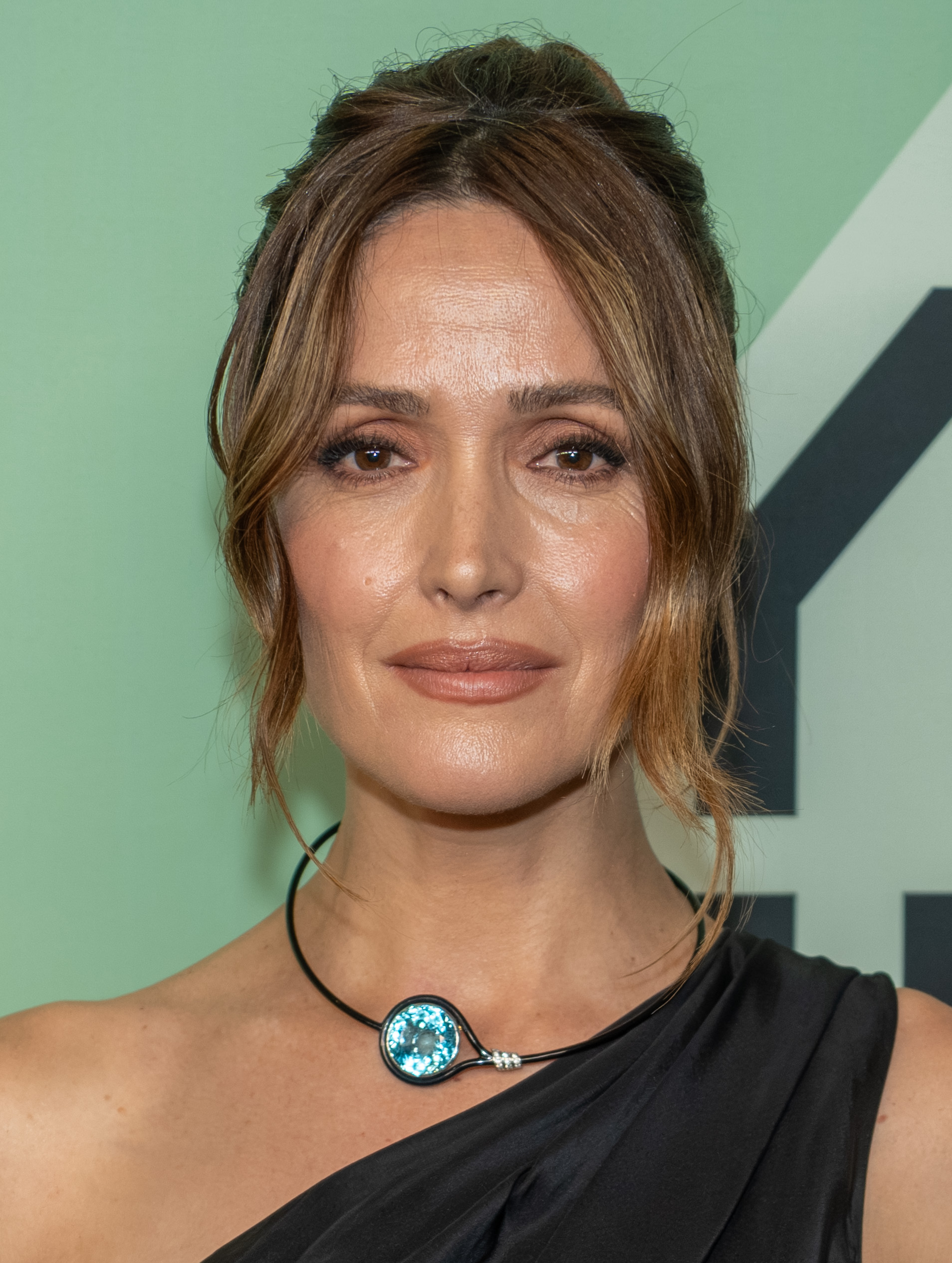
Rose Byrne, Best Female Actor in a Motion Picture – Musical or Comedy winner

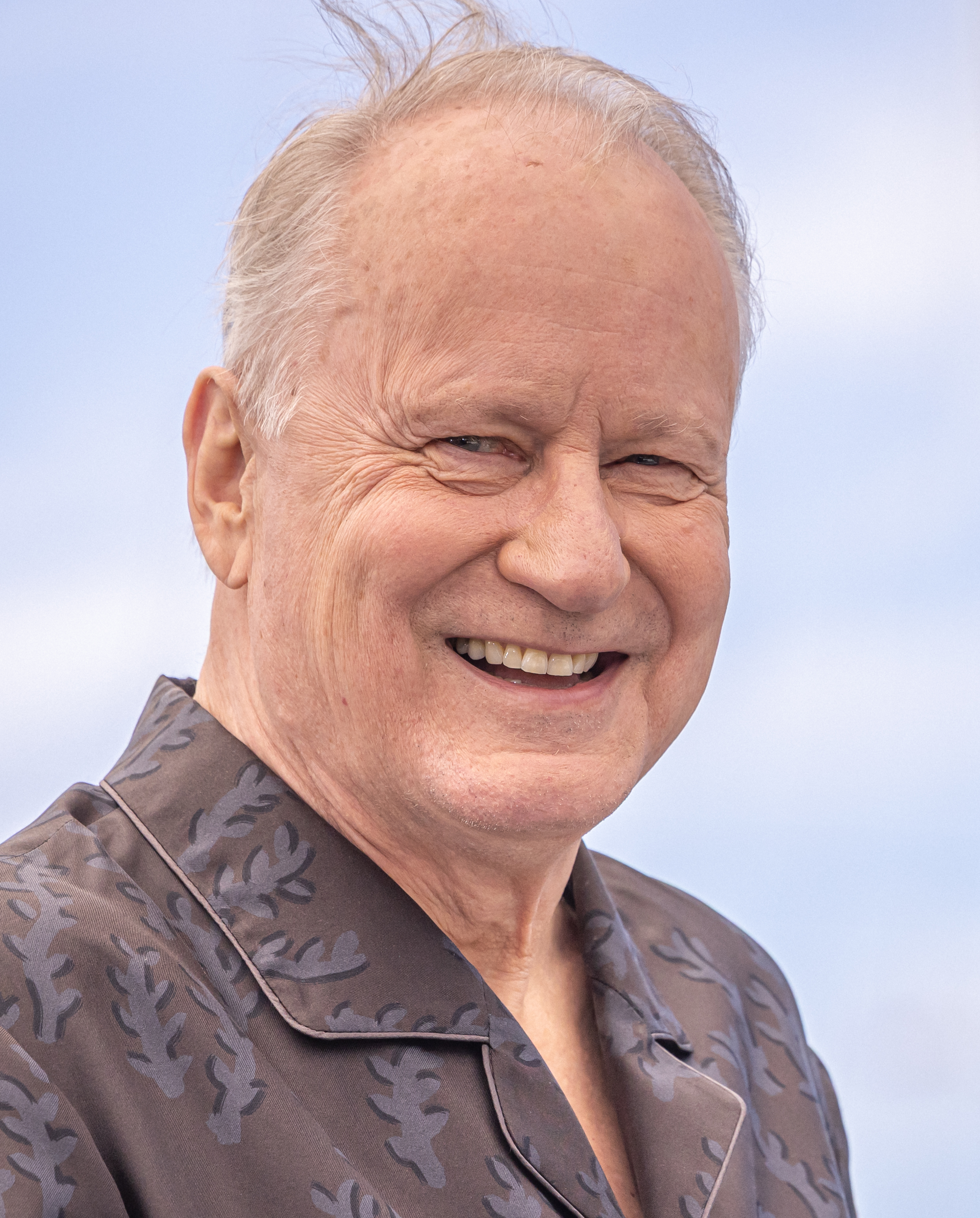
Stellan Skarsgård, Best Supporting Male Actor winner

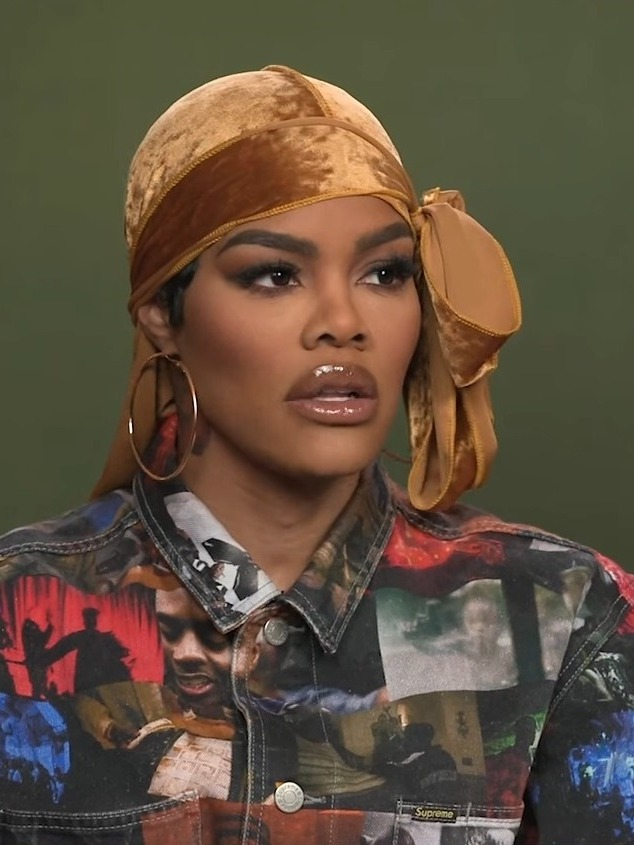
Teyana Taylor, Best Supporting Female Actor winner

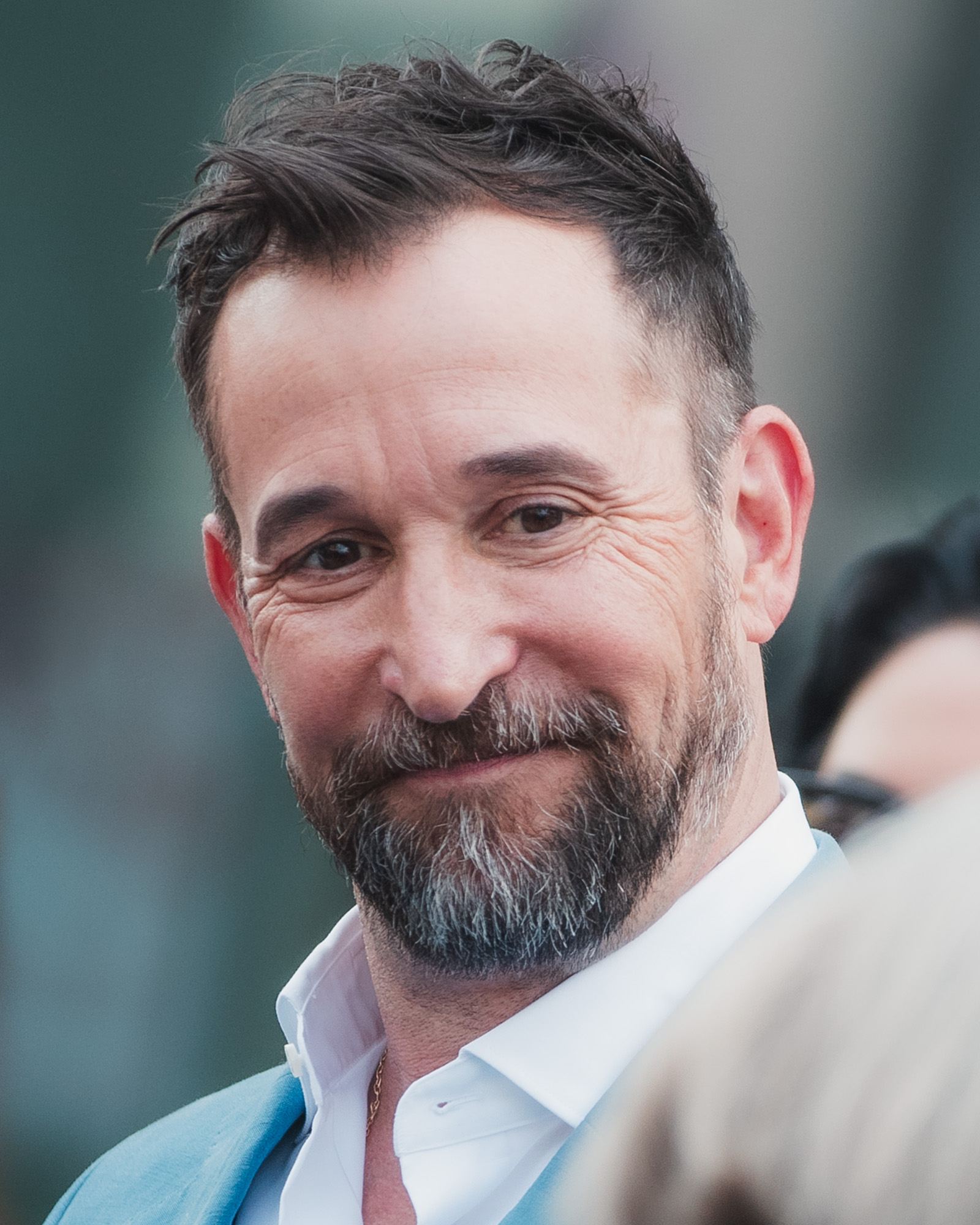
Noah Wyle, Best Male Actor in a Television Series – Drama winner

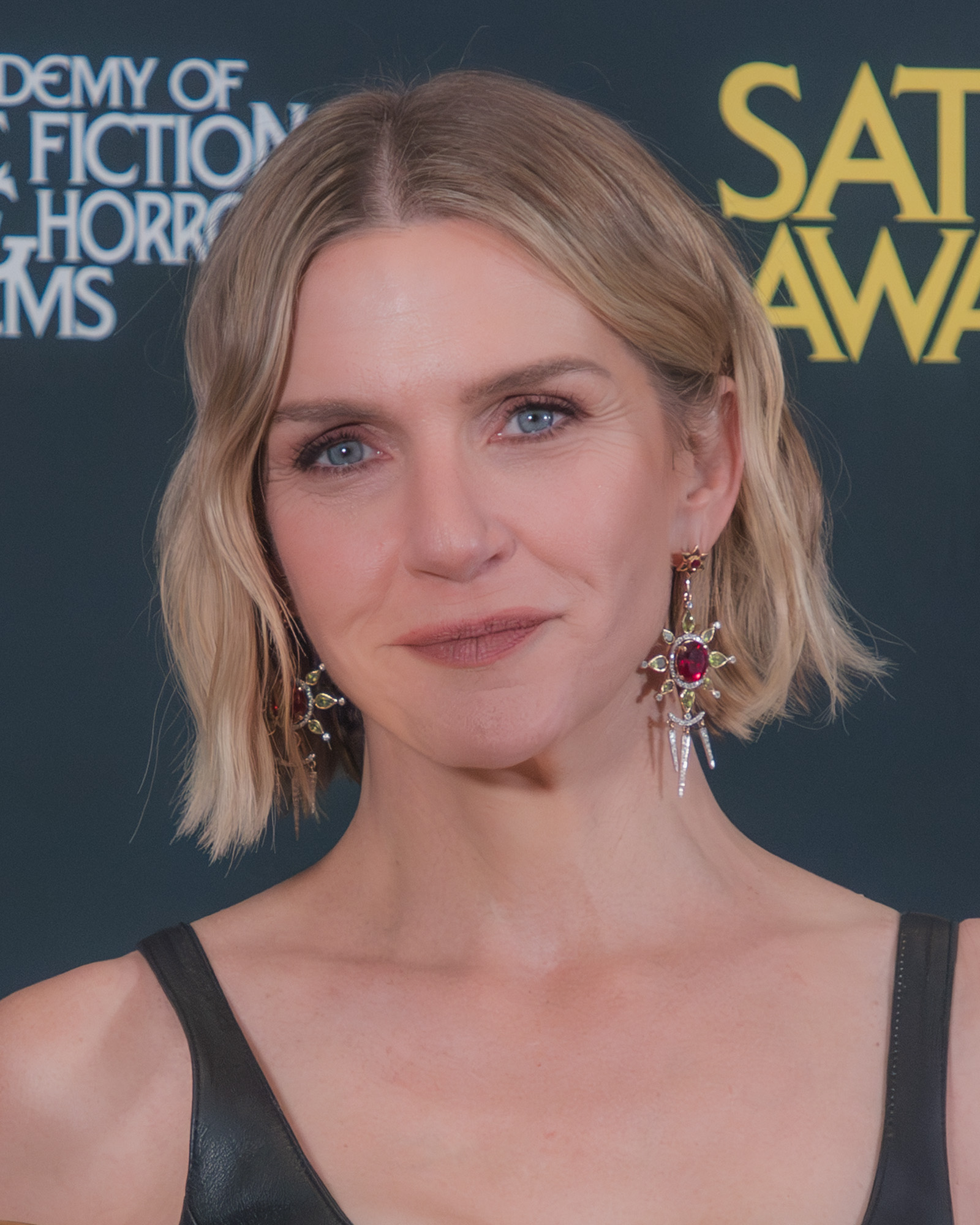
Rhea Seehorn, Best Female Actor in a Television Series – Drama winner

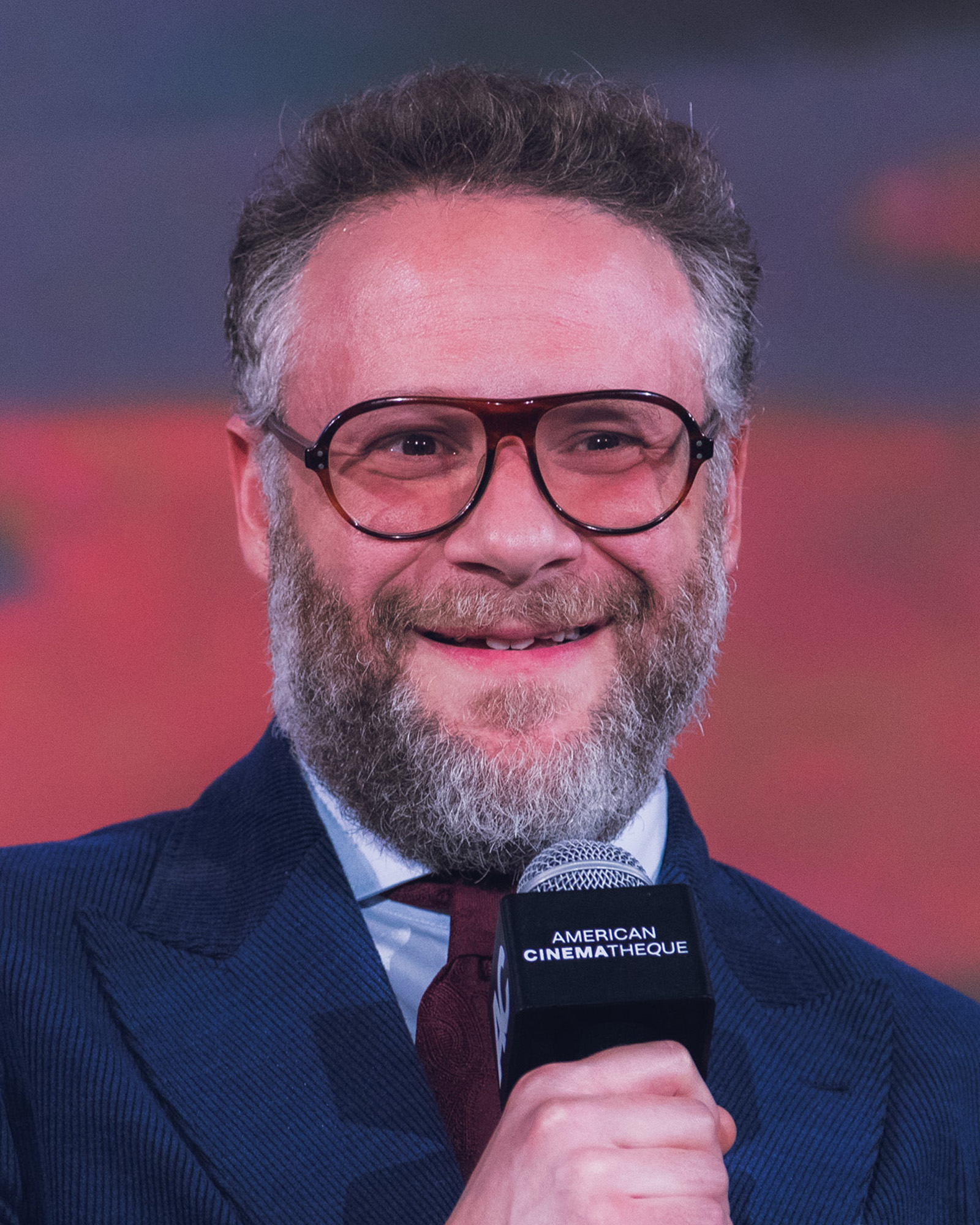
Seth Rogen, Best Male Actor in a Television Series – Musical or Comedy winner

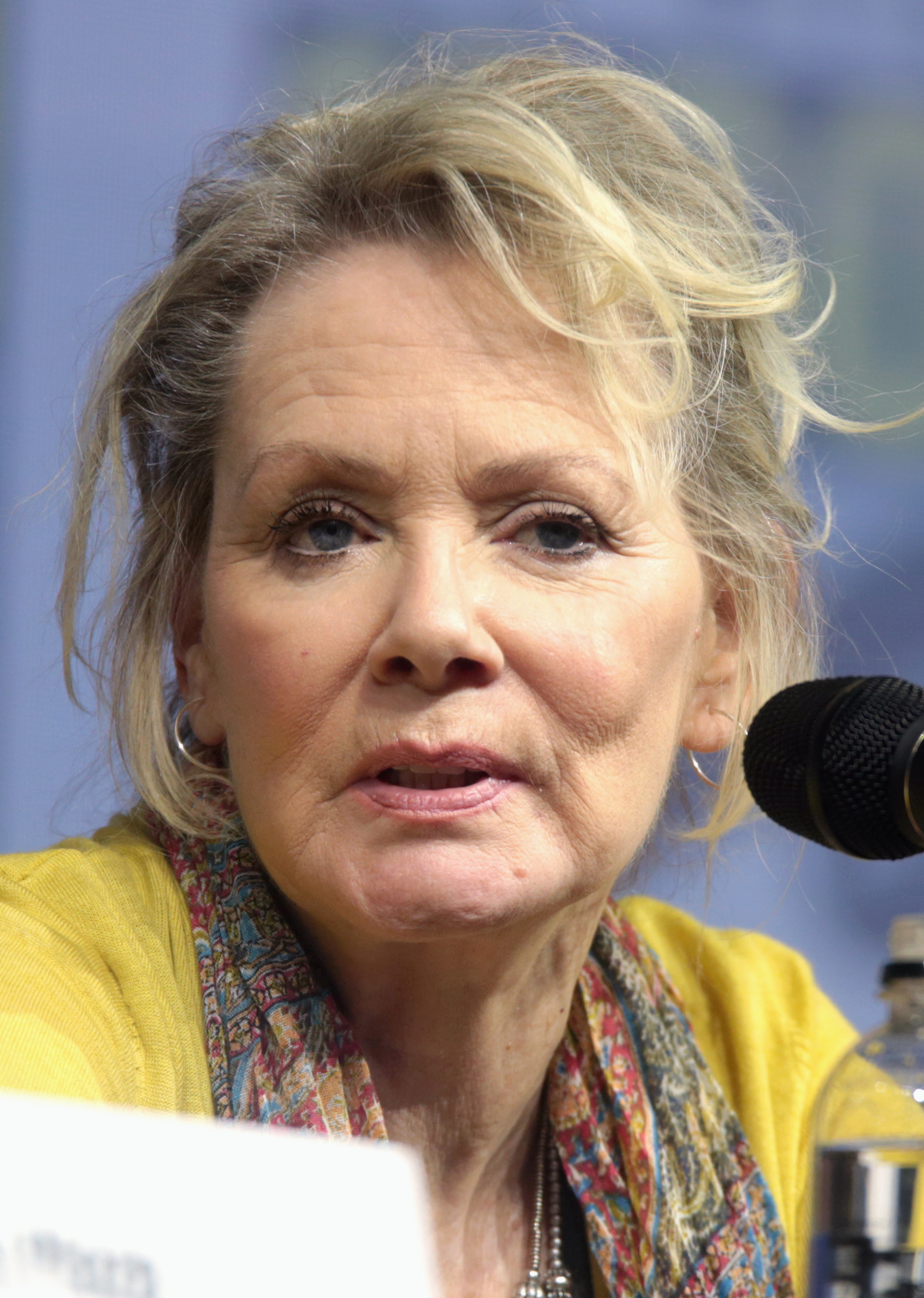
Jean Smart, Best Female Actor in a Television Series – Musical or Comedy winner

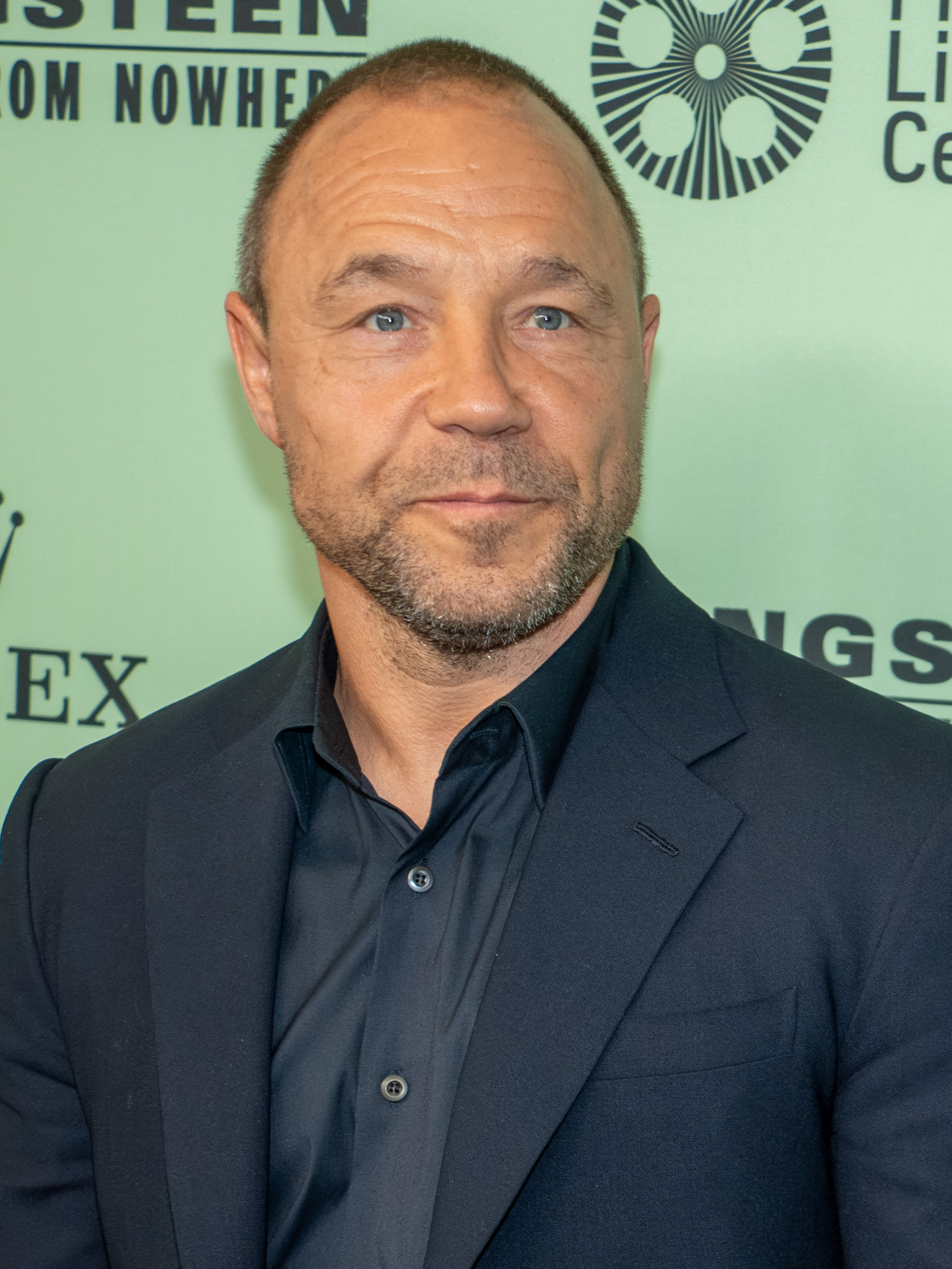
Stephen Graham, Best Male Actor in a Limited Series, Anthology Series, or Motion Picture Made for Television winner

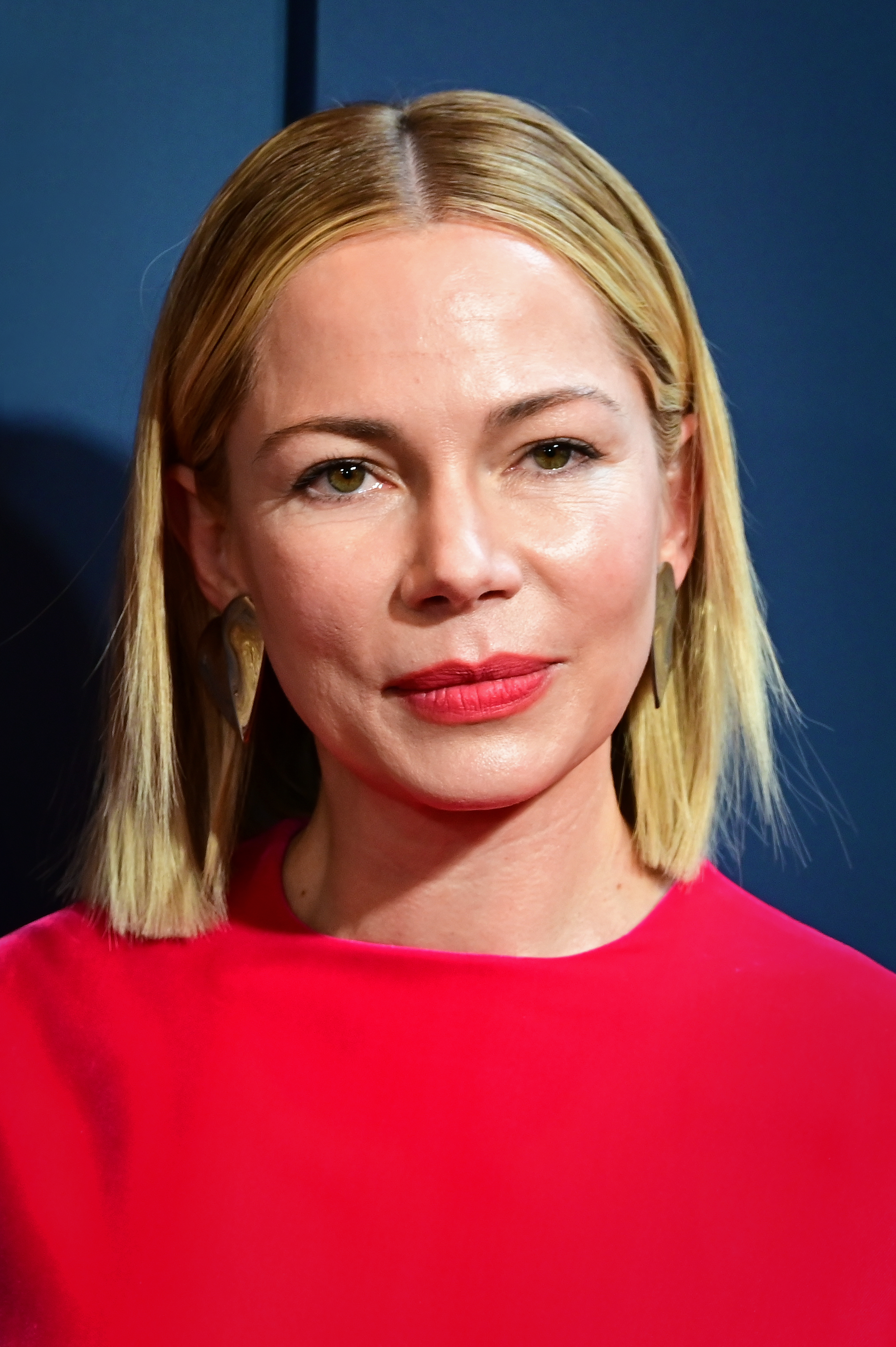
Michelle Williams, Best Female Actor in a Limited Series, Anthology Series, or Motion Picture Made for Television winner

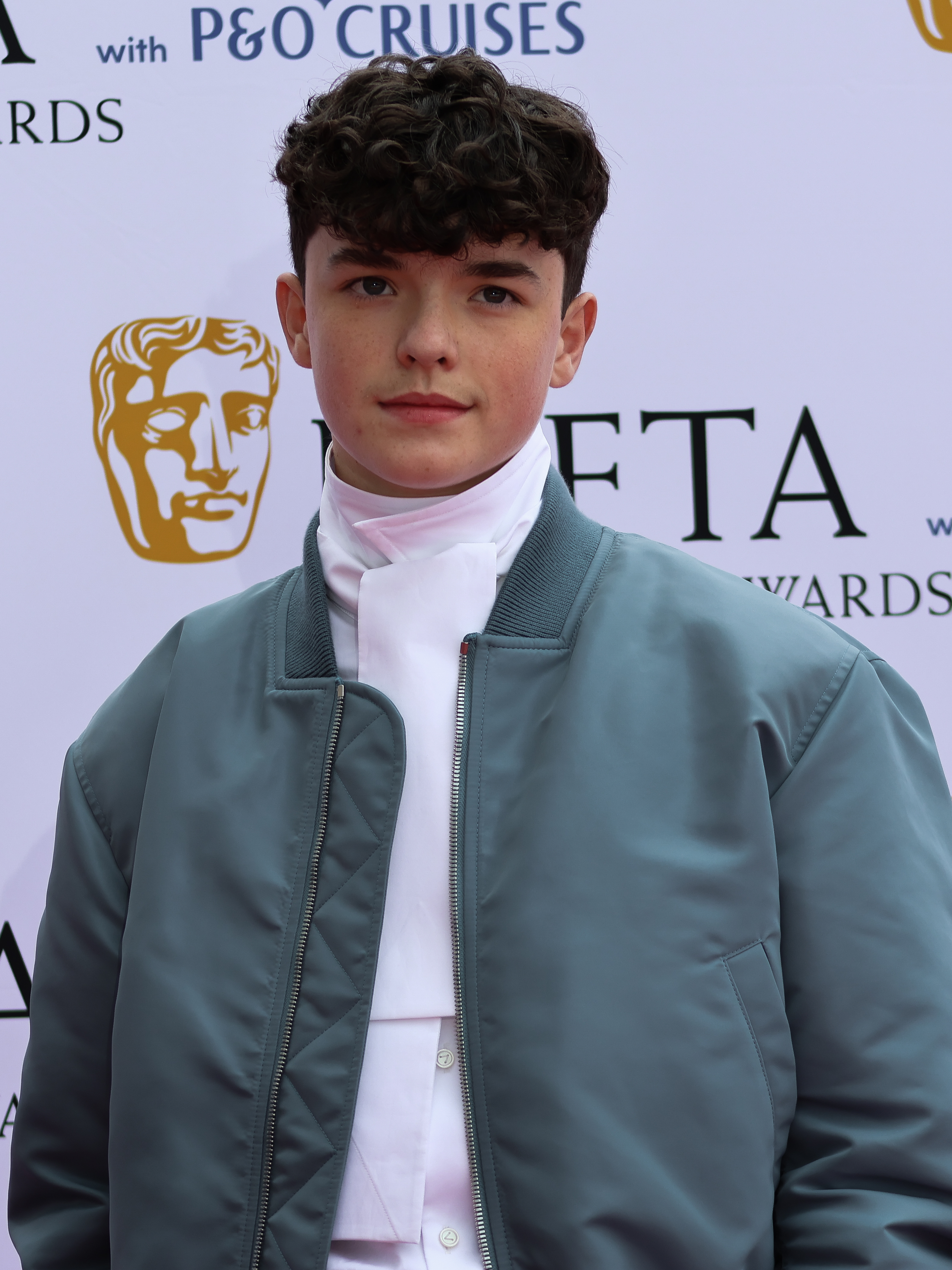
Owen Cooper, Best Supporting Male Actor in a Series, Limited Series, Anthology Series, or Motion Picture Made for Television winner

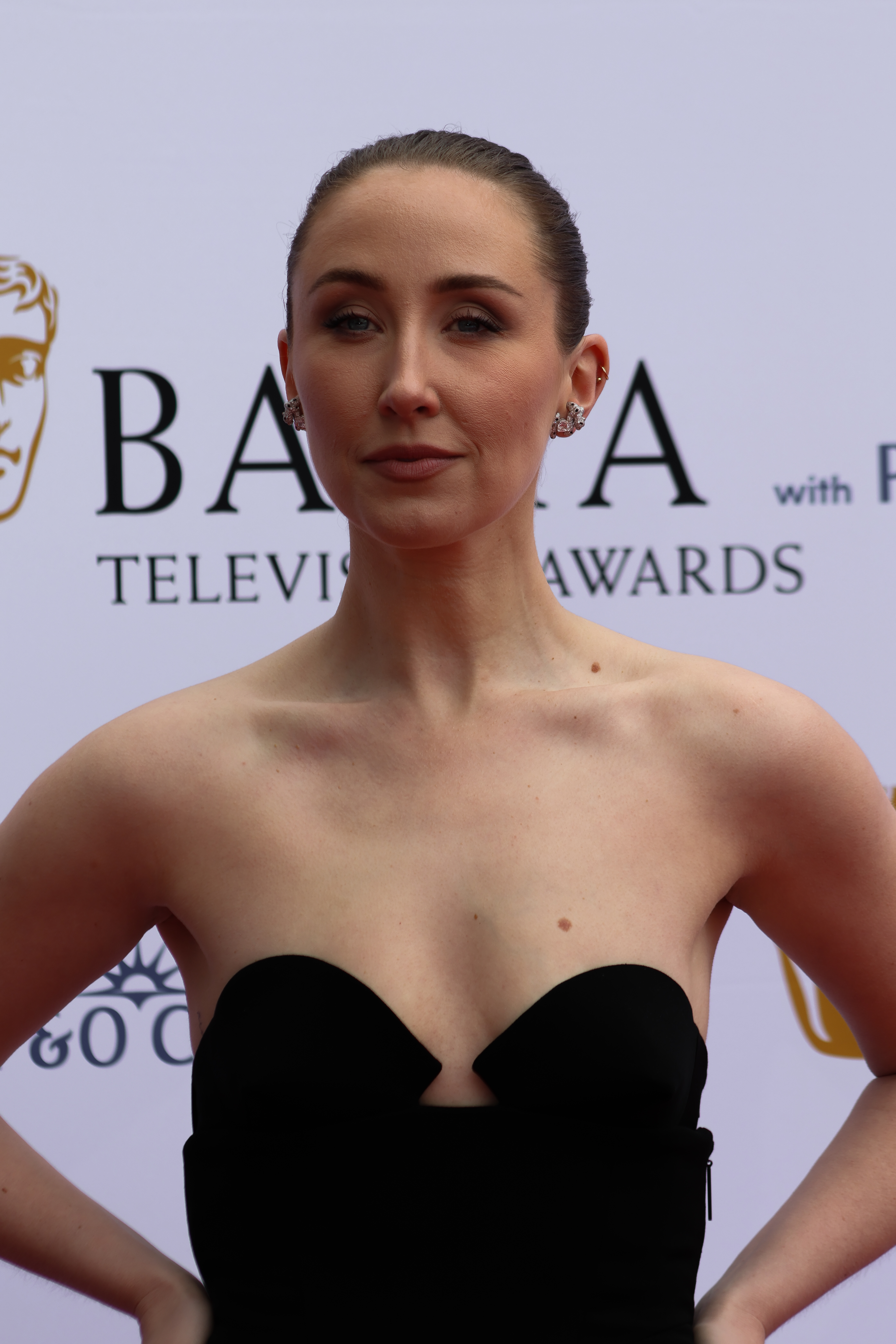
Erin Doherty, Best Supporting Female Actor in a Series, Limited Series, Anthology Series, or Motion Picture Made for Television winner

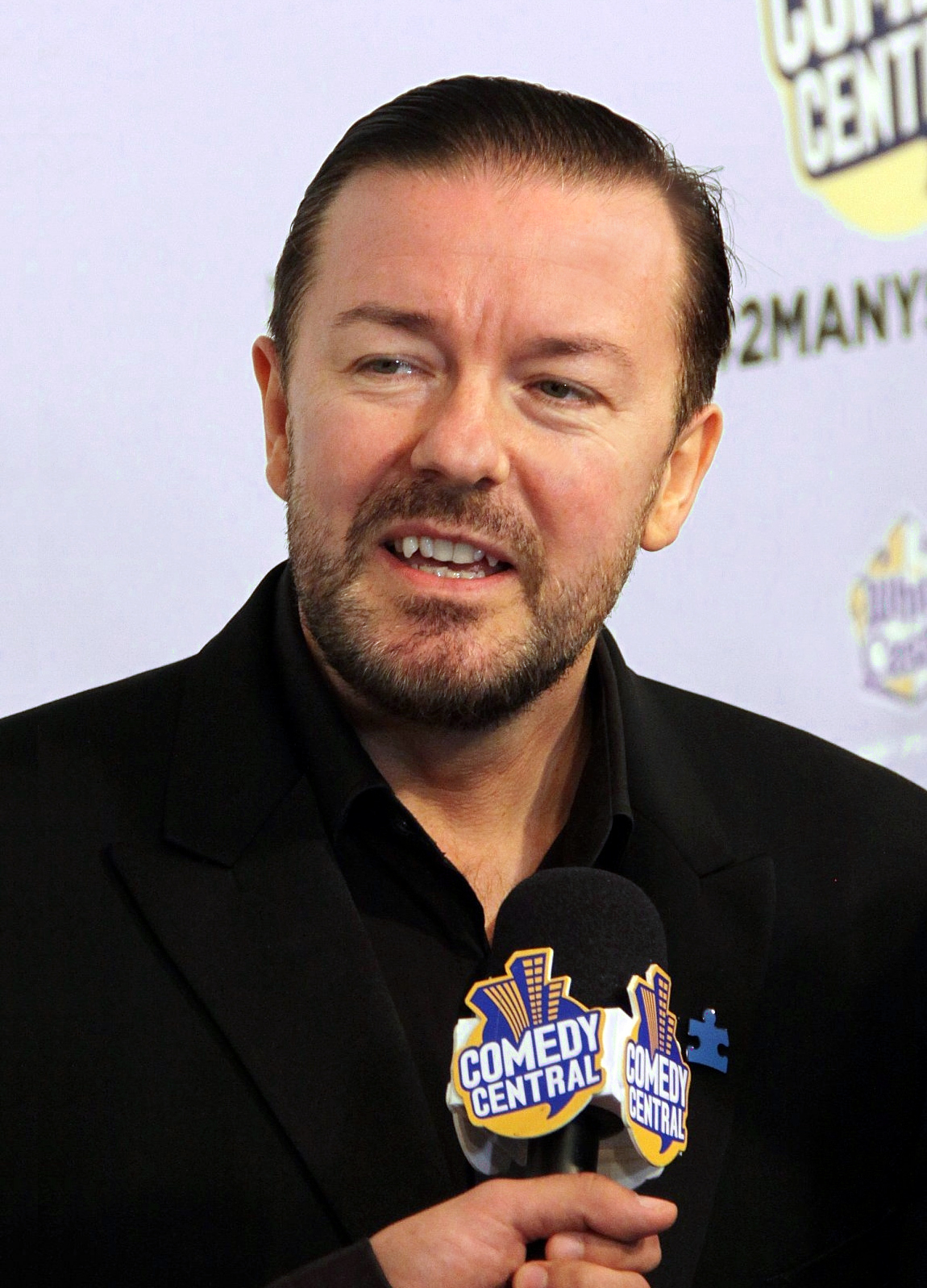
Ricky Gervais, Best Stand-Up Comedian on Television winner

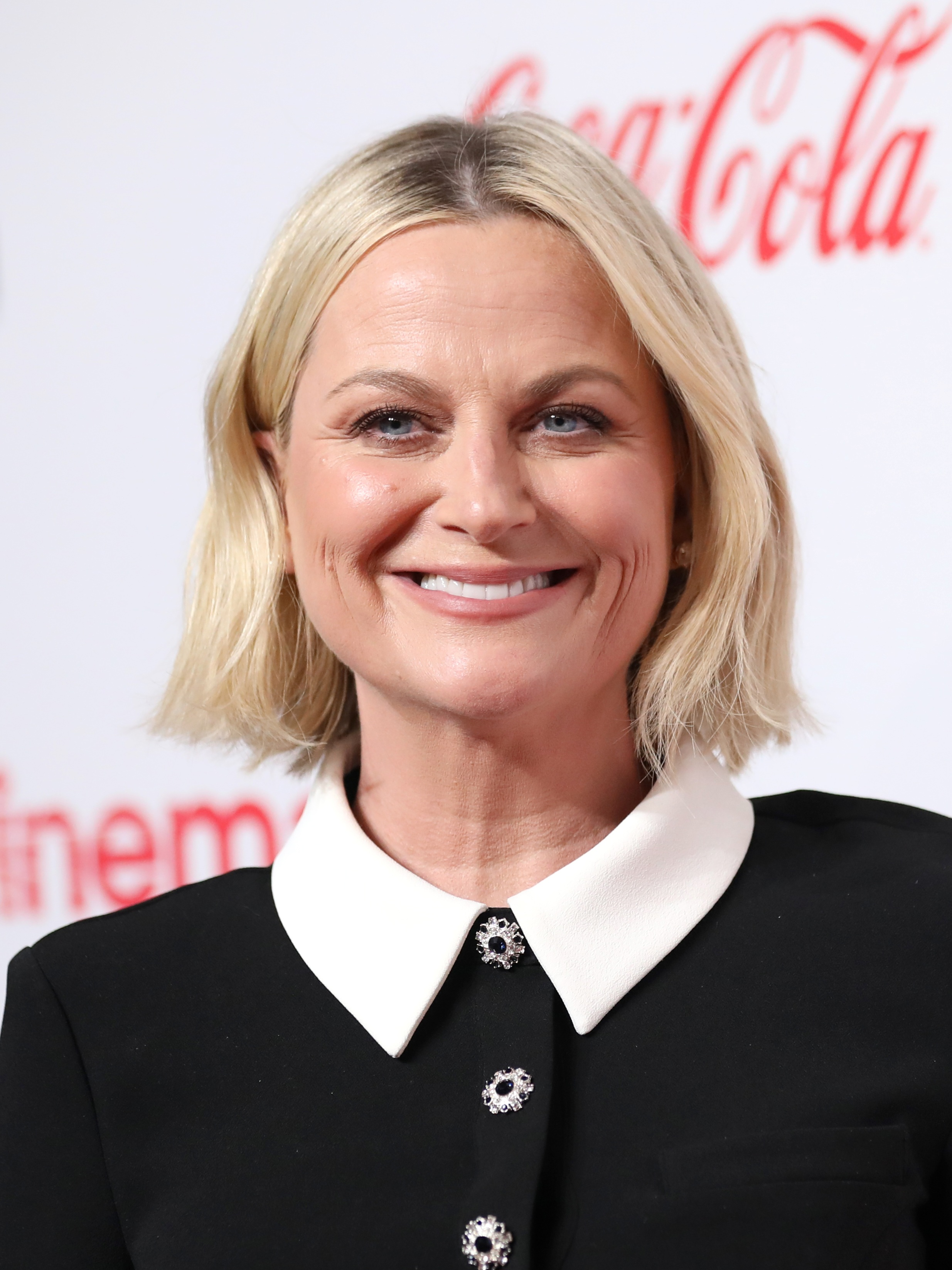
Amy Poehler, Best Podcast winner

The nominees for the 83rd Golden Globe Awards were announced on December 8, 2025 at The Beverly Hilton by actress Skye P. Marshall and actor Marlon Wayans. With a leading nine nominations, including five for acting, One Battle After Another became the sixth film of any genre to receive at least one acting bid across the four acting categories in the event's history. Sentimental Value received the second-most in film with eight nominations, followed by Sinners with seven. Additionally, The White Lotus led the television nominations with six, followed by Adolescence with five.

=== Film ===
Best Motion Picture – Drama: Hamnet; Frankenstein; It Was Just an Accident; The Secret Agent; Sentimental Value; Sinners	Best Motion Picture – Musical or Comedy: One Battle After Another; Blue Moon; Bugonia; Marty Supreme; No Other Choice; Nouvelle Vague
Best Motion Picture – Animated: KPop Demon Hunters; Arco; Demon Slayer: Kimetsu no Yaiba – The Movie: Infinity Castle; Elio; Little Amélie or the Character of Rain; Zootopia 2	Best Motion Picture – Non-English Language: The Secret Agent (Brazil); It Was Just an Accident (France); No Other Choice (South Korea); Sentimental Value (Norway); Sirāt (Spain); The Voice of Hind Rajab (Tunisia)
Best Male Actor in a Motion Picture – Drama: Wagner Moura – The Secret Agent as Marcelo Alves / Armando Solimões / Fernando Solimões; Joel Edgerton – Train Dreams as Robert Grainier; Oscar Isaac – Frankenstein as Victor Frankenstein; Dwayne Johnson – The Smashing Machine as Mark Kerr; Michael B. Jordan – Sinners as Elijah "Smoke" Moore / Elias "Stack" Moore; Jeremy Allen White – Springsteen: Deliver Me from Nowhere as Bruce Springsteen	Best Female Actor in a Motion Picture – Drama: Jessie Buckley – Hamnet as Agnes Shakespeare; Jennifer Lawrence – Die My Love as Grace; Renate Reinsve – Sentimental Value as Nora Borg; Julia Roberts – After the Hunt as Alma Imhoff; Tessa Thompson – Hedda as Hedda Gabler; Eva Victor – Sorry, Baby as Agnes
Best Male Actor in a Motion Picture – Musical or Comedy: Timothée Chalamet – Marty Supreme as Marty Mauser; George Clooney – Jay Kelly as Jay Kelly; Leonardo DiCaprio – One Battle After Another as Bob Ferguson; Ethan Hawke – Blue Moon as Lorenz Hart; Lee Byung-hun – No Other Choice as Yoo Man-su; Jesse Plemons – Bugonia as Teddy Gatz	Best Female Actor in a Motion Picture – Musical or Comedy: Rose Byrne – If I Had Legs I'd Kick You as Linda; Cynthia Erivo – Wicked: For Good as Elphaba Thropp; Kate Hudson – Song Sung Blue as Claire Sardina; Chase Infiniti – One Battle After Another as Willa Ferguson; Amanda Seyfried – The Testament of Ann Lee as Ann Lee; Emma Stone – Bugonia as Michelle Fuller
Best Supporting Male Actor in a Motion Picture: Stellan Skarsgård – Sentimental Value as Gustav Borg; Benicio del Toro – One Battle After Another as Sensei Sergio St. Carlos; Jacob Elordi – Frankenstein as The Creature; Paul Mescal – Hamnet as William Shakespeare; Sean Penn – One Battle After Another as Col. Steven J. Lockjaw; Adam Sandler – Jay Kelly as Ron Sukenick	Best Supporting Female Actor in a Motion Picture: Teyana Taylor – One Battle After Another as Perfidia Beverly Hills; Emily Blunt – The Smashing Machine as Dawn Staples; Elle Fanning – Sentimental Value as Rachel Kemp; Ariana Grande – Wicked: For Good as Galinda "Glinda" Upland; Inga Ibsdotter Lilleaas – Sentimental Value as Agnes Borg Pettersen; Amy Madigan – Weapons as Gladys
Best Director: Paul Thomas Anderson – One Battle After Another; Ryan Coogler – Sinners; Guillermo del Toro – Frankenstein; Jafar Panahi – It Was Just an Accident; Joachim Trier – Sentimental Value; Chloé Zhao – Hamnet	Best Screenplay: Paul Thomas Anderson – One Battle After Another; Ronald Bronstein and Josh Safdie – Marty Supreme; Ryan Coogler – Sinners; Jafar Panahi – It Was Just an Accident; Eskil Vogt and Joachim Trier – Sentimental Value; Chloé Zhao and Maggie O'Farrell – Hamnet
Best Original Score: Ludwig Göransson – Sinners; Alexandre Desplat – Frankenstein; Jonny Greenwood – One Battle After Another; Kangding Ray – Sirāt; Max Richter – Hamnet; Hans Zimmer – F1	Cinematic and Box Office Achievement: Sinners; Avatar: Fire and Ash; F1; KPop Demon Hunters; Mission: Impossible – The Final Reckoning; Weapons; Wicked: For Good; Zootopia 2
Best Original Song: "Golden" (Ejae, Mark Sonnenblick, Ido, 24, and Teddy) – KPop Demon Hunters; "Dream as One" (Miley Cyrus, Andrew Wyatt, Mark Ronson, and Simon Franglen) – Avatar: Fire and Ash; "The Girl in the Bubble" (Stephen Schwartz) – Wicked: For Good; "I Lied to You" (Raphael Saadiq and Ludwig Göransson) – Sinners; "No Place Like Home" (Stephen Schwartz) – Wicked: For Good; "Train Dreams" (Nick Cave and Bryce Dessner) – Train Dreams

==== Honorary award recipient ====
- Cecil B. DeMille Award: Helen Mirren

==== Films with multiple nominations ====
The following films received multiple nominations:

Nominations	Films	Category	Distributor(s)
9	One Battle After Another	M/C	Warner Bros. Pictures
8	Sentimental Value	Drama	Neon
7	Sinners	Drama	Warner Bros. Pictures
6	Hamnet	Drama	Focus Features
5	Frankenstein	Drama	Netflix
5	Wicked: For Good	M/C	Universal Pictures
4	It Was Just an Accident	Drama	Neon
3	Bugonia	M/C	Focus Features
3	KPop Demon Hunters	Animated	Netflix
3	Marty Supreme	M/C	A24
3	No Other Choice	M/C	Neon
3	The Secret Agent	Drama	Neon
2	Avatar: Fire and Ash	Drama	Walt Disney Studios Motion Pictures
2	Blue Moon	M/C	Sony Pictures Classics
2	F1	Drama	Apple Original Films
2	Jay Kelly	M/C	Netflix
2	Sirāt	Drama	Neon
2	The Smashing Machine	Drama	A24
2	Train Dreams	Drama	Netflix
2	Weapons	Drama	New Line Cinema / Warner Bros. Pictures
2	Zootopia 2	Animated	Walt Disney Studios Motion Pictures

==== Films with multiple wins ====
The following films received multiple wins:

Wins	Films	Category	Distributor
4	One Battle After Another	M/C	Warner Bros. Pictures
2	Hamnet	Drama	Focus Features
2	KPop Demon Hunters	Animated	Netflix
2	The Secret Agent	Drama	Neon
2	Sinners	Drama	Warner Bros. Pictures

=== Television ===
Best Television Series – Drama: The Pitt (HBO Max); The Diplomat (Netflix); Pluribus (Apple TV); Severance (Apple TV); Slow Horses (Apple TV); The White Lotus (HBO Max)	Best Television Series – Musical or Comedy: The Studio (Apple TV); Abbott Elementary (ABC); The Bear (FX on Hulu); Hacks (HBO Max); Nobody Wants This (Netflix); Only Murders in the Building (Hulu)
Best Limited Series, Anthology Series, or Motion Picture Made for Television: Adolescence (Netflix); All Her Fault (Peacock); The Beast in Me (Netflix); Black Mirror (Netflix); Dying for Sex (FX on Hulu); The Girlfriend (Prime Video)	Best Performance in Stand-Up Comedy on Television: Ricky Gervais – Ricky Gervais: Mortality (Netflix); Brett Goldstein – Brett Goldstein: The Second Best Night of Your Life (HBO Max); Kevin Hart – Kevin Hart: Acting My Age (Netflix); Bill Maher – Bill Maher: Is Anyone Else Seeing This? (HBO Max); Kumail Nanjiani – Kumail Nanjiani: Night Thoughts (Hulu); Sarah Silverman – Sarah Silverman: PostMortem (Netflix)
Best Male Actor in a Television Series – Drama: Noah Wyle – The Pitt as Dr. Michael "Robby" Robinavitch (HBO Max); Sterling K. Brown – Paradise as Xavier Collins (Hulu); Diego Luna – Andor as Cassian Andor (Disney+); Gary Oldman – Slow Horses as Jackson Lamb (Apple TV); Mark Ruffalo – Task as Tom Brandis (HBO Max); Adam Scott – Severance as Mark Scout / Mark S. (Apple TV)	Best Female Actor in a Television Series – Drama: Rhea Seehorn – Pluribus as Carol Sturka (Apple TV); Kathy Bates – Matlock as Madeline Kingston / Madeline "Matty" Matlock (CBS); Britt Lower – Severance as Helena Eagan / Helly R. (Apple TV); Helen Mirren – MobLand as Maeve Harrigan (Paramount+); Bella Ramsey – The Last of Us as Ellie (HBO Max); Keri Russell – The Diplomat as Katherine "Kate" Wyler (Netflix)
Best Male Actor in a Television Series – Musical or Comedy: Seth Rogen – The Studio as Matt Remick (Apple TV); Adam Brody – Nobody Wants This as Noah Roklov (Netflix); Steve Martin – Only Murders in the Building as Charles-Haden Savage (Hulu); Glen Powell – Chad Powers as Russ Holliday / Chad Powers (Hulu); Martin Short – Only Murders in the Building as Oliver Putnam (Hulu); Jeremy Allen White – The Bear as Carmen "Carmy" Berzatto (FX on Hulu)	Best Female Actor in a Television Series – Musical or Comedy: Jean Smart – Hacks as Deborah Vance (HBO Max); Kristen Bell – Nobody Wants This as Joanne Williams (Netflix); Ayo Edebiri – The Bear as Sydney Adamu (FX on Hulu); Selena Gomez – Only Murders in the Building as Mabel Mora (Hulu); Natasha Lyonne – Poker Face as Charlie Cale (Peacock); Jenna Ortega – Wednesday as Wednesday Addams (Netflix)
Best Male Actor in a Limited Series, Anthology Series, or Motion Picture Made for Television: Stephen Graham – Adolescence as Eddie Miller (Netflix); Jacob Elordi – The Narrow Road to the Deep North as Dorrigo Evans (Prime Video); Paul Giamatti – Black Mirror as Phillip Connarty (Netflix); Charlie Hunnam – Monster: The Ed Gein Story as Ed Gein (Netflix); Jude Law – Black Rabbit as Jake Friedkin (Netflix); Matthew Rhys – The Beast in Me as Nile Jarvis (Netflix)	Best Female Actor in a Limited Series, Anthology Series, or Motion Picture Made for Television: Michelle Williams – Dying for Sex as Molly Kochan (FX on Hulu); Claire Danes – The Beast in Me as Agatha "Aggie" Wiggs (Netflix); Rashida Jones – Black Mirror as Amanda Waters (Netflix); Amanda Seyfried – Long Bright River as Mickey Fitzpatrick (Peacock); Sarah Snook – All Her Fault as Marissa Irvine (Peacock); Robin Wright – The Girlfriend as Laura Sanderson (Prime Video)
Best Supporting Male Actor on Television: Owen Cooper – Adolescence as Jamie Miller (Netflix); Billy Crudup – The Morning Show as Cory Ellison (Apple TV); Walton Goggins – The White Lotus as Rick Hatchett (HBO Max); Jason Isaacs – The White Lotus as Timothy Ratliff (HBO Max); Tramell Tillman – Severance as Seth Milchick (Apple TV); Ashley Walters – Adolescence as DI Luke Bascombe (Netflix)	Best Supporting Female Actor on Television: Erin Doherty – Adolescence as Briony Ariston (Netflix); Carrie Coon – The White Lotus as Laurie Duffy (HBO Max); Hannah Einbinder – Hacks as Ava Daniels (HBO Max); Catherine O'Hara – The Studio as Patty Leigh (Apple TV); Parker Posey – The White Lotus as Victoria Ratliff (HBO Max); Aimee Lou Wood – The White Lotus as Chelsea (HBO Max)

==== Honorary award recipient ====
- Carol Burnett Award: Sarah Jessica Parker

==== Series with multiple nominations ====
The following television series received multiple nominations:

Nominations	Series	Category	Distributor
6	The White Lotus	Drama	HBO Max
5	Adolescence	LAMP	Netflix
4	Only Murders in the Building	M/C	Hulu
4	Severance	Drama	Apple TV
3	The Bear	M/C	FX on Hulu
3	The Beast in Me	LAMP	Netflix
3	Black Mirror	LAMP	Netflix
3	Hacks	M/C	HBO Max
3	Nobody Wants This	M/C	Netflix
3	The Studio	M/C	Apple TV
2	All Her Fault	LAMP	Peacock
2	The Diplomat	Drama	Netflix
2	Dying for Sex	LAMP	FX on Hulu
2	The Girlfriend	LAMP	Prime Video
2	The Pitt	Drama	HBO Max
2	Pluribus	Drama	Apple TV
2	Slow Horses	Drama	Apple TV

==== Series with multiple wins ====
The following series received multiple wins:

Wins	Series	Category	Distributor
4	Adolescence	LAMP	Netflix
2	The Pitt	Drama	HBO Max
2	The Studio	M/C	Apple TV

=== Podcasting ===
Best Podcast
- Good Hang with Amy Poehler – Amy Poehler (Spotify)
  - Armchair Expert with Dax Shepard – Dax Shepard (Wondery)
  - Call Her Daddy – Alex Cooper (SiriusXM)
  - The Mel Robbins Podcast – Mel Robbins (SiriusXM)
  - SmartLess – Jason Bateman, Will Arnett, and Sean Hayes (SiriusXM)
  - Up First – Leila Fadel, Steve Inskeep, Michel Martin, A Martínez, Scott Simon, and Ayesha Rascoe (NPR)

== Presenters ==
Name(s)	Role
Jennifer Garner; Amanda Seyfried	Presented the award for Best Supporting Female Actor – Motion Picture
Kevin Bacon; Kyra Sedgwick	Presented the award for Best Supporting Male Actor – Motion Picture
Lalisa Manobal; Priyanka Chopra Jonas	Presented the award for Best Male Actor in a Television Series – Drama
Sean Hayes; Will Arnett; Jason Bateman	Presented the award for Best Female Actor in a Television Series – Musical or Comedy
Luke Grimes; Justin Hartley	Presented the award for Best Supporting Male Actor – Series, Limited Series, Anthology Series, or Motion Picture Made for Television
Zoë Kravitz; Dave Franco	Presented the award for Best Male Actor in a Television Series – Musical or Comedy
Snoop Dogg	Presented the award for Best Podcast
Joe Keery; Charli XCX	Presented the award for Best Original Song and Best Original Score
Macaulay Culkin	Presented the award for Best Screenplay
Pamela Anderson; Miley Cyrus	Presented the award for Best Female Actor in a Motion Picture – Musical or Comedy
Jennifer Lopez	Presented the award for Best Male Actor in a Motion Picture – Musical or Comedy
Melissa McCarthy; Kathryn Hahn	Presented the awards for Best Male Actor – Limited Series, Anthology Series, or Motion Picture Made for Television and Best Female Actor – Limited Series, Anthology Series, or Motion Picture Made for Television
Kevin Hart	Presented the award for Cinematic and Box Office Achievement
Judd Apatow	Presented the award for Best Director
Mila Kunis; Keegan-Michael Key	Presented the award for Best Motion Picture – Animated
Orlando Bloom; Minnie Driver	Presented the award for Best Motion Picture – Non-English Language
Connor Storrie; Hudson Williams	Presented the award for Best Supporting Female Actor – Series, Limited Series, Anthology Series, or Motion Picture Made for Television
Wanda Sykes	Presented the award for Best Performance in Stand-Up Comedy on Television
Dakota Fanning; Queen Latifah	Presented the awards for Best Female Actor – Television Series Drama and Best Television Series – Drama
Ayo Edebiri; Hailee Steinfeld	Presented the award for Best Limited Series, Anthology Series, or Motion Picture Made for Television
Adam Scott; Marlon Wayans	Presented the award for Best Television Series – Musical or Comedy
Chris Pine; Ana de Armas	Presented the award for Best Female Actor in a Motion Picture – Drama
Diane Lane; Colman Domingo	Presented the award for Best Male Actor in a Motion Picture – Drama
Julia Roberts	Presented the award for Best Motion Picture – Musical or Comedy
George Clooney; Don Cheadle	Presented the award for Best Motion Picture – Drama
