= Golden Globe Award for Best Performance in Stand-Up Comedy on Television =

Award presented annually by the Golden Globe Foundation

- Awarded for: Excellence in Stand-Up Comedy
- Location: United States
- Presented by: Dick Clark Productions
- First award: 2023
- Most recent winner: Ricky Gervais, Ricky Gervais: Mortality (2025)
- Website: goldenglobes.com

The Golden Globe Award for Best Performance in Stand-Up Comedy on Television (a.k.a. Best Stand-Up Comedian on Television) is an award that was first presented in 2024, via the voting journalists of the Golden Globe Foundation (following the disbanding of the Hollywood Foreign Press Association in 2023).

Comedian Nikki Glaser, who hosted the 82nd Golden Globe Awards, was simultaneously nominated for this award at the same ceremony.

== Criteria ==
According to Dick Clark Productions, qualifications include performing a traditional stand-up comedy routine lasting 30 minutes or more (excluding guest appearances on scripted series). The comedic routine must air in the United States during the calendar year for eligibility; and must be released on any variety of cable, pay-per-view, or streaming services—but social media accounts do not qualify.

Eligibility is open to both individual comedians or an ensemble group as well. Finally, there will be a total of six nominees per year.

"The Golden Globes has a rich history of supporting and celebrating the work of comedians, and we’re thrilled to honor their brilliance," Golden Globes president Helen Hoehne stated, upon revealing new categories.

== Winners and nominees ==
=== 2020s ===
Year	Comedian	Title	Distributor
2023	Ricky Gervais	Ricky Gervais: Armageddon	Netflix
2023	Trevor Noah	Trevor Noah: Where Was I?	Netflix
2023	Chris Rock	Chris Rock: Selective Outrage	Netflix
2023	Amy Schumer	Amy Schumer: Emergency Contact	Netflix
2023	Sarah Silverman	Sarah Silverman: Someone You Love	HBO / Max
2023	Wanda Sykes	Wanda Sykes: I'm an Entertainer	Netflix
2024
2024	Ali Wong	Ali Wong: Single Lady	Netflix
2024	Jamie Foxx	Jamie Foxx: What Had Happened Was...	Netflix
2024	Nikki Glaser	Nikki Glaser: Someday You'll Die	HBO / Max
2024	Seth Meyers	Seth Meyers: Dad Man Walking	HBO / Max
2024	Adam Sandler	Adam Sandler: Love You	Netflix
2024	Ramy Youssef	Ramy Youssef: More Feelings	HBO / Max
2025	Ricky Gervais	Ricky Gervais: Mortality	Netflix
2025	Bill Maher	Bill Maher: Is Anyone Else Seeing This?	HBO
2025	Brett Goldstein	Brett Goldstein: The Second Best Night of Your Life	HBO
2025	Kevin Hart	Kevin Hart: Acting My Age	Netflix
2025	Kumail Nanjiani	Kumail Nanjiani: Night Thoughts	Hulu
2025	Sarah Silverman	Sarah Silverman: PostMortem	Netflix

== Multiple wins and nominations ==
=== Multiple Wins ===
Ricky Gervais: 2 wins

=== Multiple Nominations ===
Nominations	Comedian
2	Ricky Gervais
2	Sarah Silverman

== See also ==
- Golden Globe Award for Cinematic and Box Office Achievement – A cousin category introduced in the same year, albeit for films
- Grammy Award for Best Comedy Album
