= Golden Globe Award for Cinematic and Box Office Achievement =

Film award

- Location: United States
- Presented by: Golden Globe Foundation
- Currently held by: Sinners (2025)
- Website: Golden Globes

The Golden Globe Award for Cinematic and Box Office Achievement is a Golden Globe Award that was first awarded in 2024 by Golden Globe Foundation.

== Criteria ==
According to Dick Clark Productions, the new organizing body of the Golden Globes, the award recognizes “the year’s most acclaimed, highest-earning and/or most viewed films that have garnered extensive global audience support and attained cinematic excellence.”

To be eligible for nomination, a film must have grossed $150 million with at least $100 million grossed in the U.S., or have garnered “commensurate digital streaming viewership recognized by trusted industry sources.” Films released between November 22 and the end of the year may qualify based on projected box office performance or streaming views. From the eligible films, nominees and winners are voted for based on excellence.

The award is given to the individual producers accredited by the Producers Guild of America for the film.

== Winners and nominees ==
=== 2020s ===
Year	Film	Producer(s)	Distributor	Ref.
2023 (81st)	Barbie	David Heyman, Margot Robbie, Tom Ackerley, Robbie Brenner	Warner Bros. Pictures	
2023 (81st)	Guardians of the Galaxy Vol. 3	Kevin Feige	Walt Disney Studios	
2023 (81st)	John Wick: Chapter 4	Basil Iwanyk, Erica Lee, Chad Stahelski	Lionsgate Films	
2023 (81st)	Mission: Impossible – Dead Reckoning Part One	Tom Cruise, Christopher McQuarrie	Paramount Pictures	
2023 (81st)	Oppenheimer	Emma Thomas, Charles Roven, Christopher Nolan	Universal Pictures	
2023 (81st)	Spider-Man: Across the Spider-Verse	Avi Arad, Phil Lord, Christopher Miller, Amy Pascal, Christina Steinberg	Sony Pictures Releasing	
2023 (81st)	The Super Mario Bros. Movie	Christopher Meledandri	Universal Pictures	
2023 (81st)	Taylor Swift: The Eras Tour	Taylor Swift	AMC Theatres	
2024 (82nd)	Wicked	Marc Platt	Universal Pictures	
2024 (82nd)	Alien: Romulus	Ridley Scott, Michael Pruss, Walter Hill	20th Century Studios	
2024 (82nd)	Beetlejuice Beetlejuice	Tim Burton, Tommy Harper	Warner Bros. Pictures	
2024 (82nd)	Deadpool & Wolverine	Kevin Feige, Shawn Levy, Ryan Reynolds	Walt Disney Studios	
2024 (82nd)	Gladiator II	Lucy Fisher, Michael Pruss, Ridley Scott, Douglas WIck	Paramount Pictures	
2024 (82nd)	Inside Out 2	Mark Nielsen	Walt Disney Studios	
2024 (82nd)	Twisters	Frank Marshall	Universal Pictures	
2024 (82nd)	The Wild Robot	Jeff Hermann	Universal Pictures	
2025 (83rd)	Sinners	Zinzi Coogler, Ryan Coogler, Sev Ohanian	Warner Bros. Pictures	
2025 (83rd)	Avatar: Fire and Ash	James Cameron, Jon Landau (posthumous nomination)	Walt Disney Studios	
2025 (83rd)	F1	Joseph Kosinski, Jerry Bruckheimer, Brad Pitt, Dede Gardner, Jeremy Kleiner, Chad Oman	Apple Original Films	
2025 (83rd)	KPop Demon Hunters	Michelle Wong	Netflix	
2025 (83rd)	Mission: Impossible – The Final Reckoning	Tom Cruise, Christopher McQuarrie	Paramount Pictures	
2025 (83rd)	Weapons	Zach Cregger, Miri Yoon	Warner Bros. Pictures	
2025 (83rd)	Wicked: For Good	Marc Platt	Universal Pictures	
2025 (83rd)	Zootopia 2	Yvett Merino	Walt Disney Studios	

== Franchises with multiple nominations ==
- Wicked - 2 (one win)
- Mission: Impossible - 2
- Marvel Cinematic Universe - 2

== Producers with multiple nominations ==
- Marc Platt - 2 (one win)
- Tom Cruise - 2
- Kevin Feige - 2
- Christopher McQuarrie - 2
- Ridley Scott - 2

== See also ==
- Academy Award for Outstanding Achievement in Popular Film, a proposed award that was scrapped following backlash
- Golden Globe Award for Best Performance in Stand-Up Comedy on Television, a cousin category introduced simultaneously, albeit for television
