= Academy Award for Outstanding Achievement in Popular Film =

Award proposed in 2018 for the 91st Oscars

- Awarded for: Outstanding Achievement in Popular Film
- Country: United States
- Presented by: Academy of Motion Picture Arts and Sciences (AMPAS)
- Website: oscars.org

The Academy Award for Outstanding Achievement in Popular Film (or the Academy Award for Best Popular Film) was a proposed award to be presented annually by the Academy of Motion Picture Arts and Sciences (AMPAS). It was announced as a new category by the Academy on August 8, 2018.

The following month, AMPAS announced that the award would not be presented at the 91st Academy Awards as planned. It would be postponed to "examine and seek additional input regarding the new category".

== History ==
On August 8, 2018, the Academy announced a proposal to establish a new category reflecting outstanding achievements in "popular" film, being the first new category announced since Best Animated Feature Film in 2001. Although no details were provided, media outlets suggested that the category was intended primarily for blockbuster films with mainstream appeal. Films nominated for Outstanding Achievement in Popular Film would also be eligible for Best Picture.

The following month, the Academy announced that the award would not be presented at the 91st Academy Awards as planned. It would be postponed to "examine and seek additional input regarding the new category". In November 2018, Academy president John Bailey confirmed the award was created in direct response to the Oscars telecast's diminishing television ratings. He hoped it might still be instituted. "Even after a stake was driven through its heart," he said, "there's still interest." He drew a comparison to the separate Best Picture awards presented at the 1st Academy Awards, where Wings won Outstanding Picture and Sunrise won Unique and Artistic Picture.

== Reception ==
The announcement of a Popular Film category was met with backlash from journalists and Academy members alike. Many viewed it as a conspicuous attempt to pander to mainstream audiences, in the hopes of increasing annual ratings. The category was criticized for diminishing blockbuster films' chances at receiving a Best Picture nomination. The name of the category was further criticized, with "popular" suggesting that films nominated in other categories were unpopular or not of interest to mainstream audiences. Bob Chipman at Escapist Magazine said that the frontrunner for the inaugural prize would be Black Panther, a film with a predominantly African-American cast and, considering its prominence within African-American culture, would effectively receive a "separate but equal" Best Picture award.

By contrast, Gene Del Vecchio, author of Creating Blockbusters and who is on the faculty of the USC Marshall School of Business, has been a proponent of an Academy Award for Outstanding Achievement among Blockbusters for quite some time. His opinion appeared in an April 2014 Huffington Post article, then again in two 2018 articles for USA Today, one in March and one in August, and finally in a November 2019 column in The Hollywood Reporter. He said that a Best Blockbuster Film category marks a "return to the roots" of the Oscars. From the 1940s to the 1990s, the Best Picture Oscar went to a top-10 box office blockbuster nearly nine times out of ten. After 2010, the award for Best Picture would not be awarded to a top 10 box office film again until Oppenheimer at the 96th Academy Awards in 2024. The 2024 award was the first Best Picture win for a top 10 box office performer since the 76th Academy Awards in 2004, when the award was won by The Lord of the Rings: Return of the King.

== See also ==
- Golden Globe Award for Cinematic and Box Office Achievement
