= The White Lotus season 4 =

The White Lotus
- Season 4
- Starring: Ben Kingsley; Vincent Cassel; Laura Dern; Steve Coogan; Max Greenfield; Kumail Nanjiani; Heather Graham; Rosie Perez; Sandra Bernhard; Chris Messina; Alexander Ludwig; AJ Michalka; Max Minghella; Pekka Strang; Ari Graynor; Chloe Bennet

Release
- Original network: HBO

Season chronology
- ← Previous; Season 3

The upcoming fourth season of The White Lotus, an American black comedy drama anthology television series created by Mike White is set to premiere on HBO in the first half of 2027. The season is set and filmed on the French Riviera. The ensemble cast includes Ben Kingsley, Vincent Cassel, Laura Dern, Steve Coogan, Max Greenfield, Kumail Nanjiani, Heather Graham, Rosie Perez, Sandra Bernhard, Chris Messina, Alexander Ludwig, AJ Michalka, Max Minghella, Pekka Strang, Ari Graynor, Chloe Bennet, Dylan Ennis, Corentin Fila, Caleb Jonte Edwards, Frida Gustavsson, Charlie Hall, Jarrad Paul, Ben Schnetzer, Laura Smet, Nadia Tereszkiewicz, and Marissa Long. Helena Bonham Carter was originally cast but departed the production shortly after filming began in April 2026 and was replaced by Dern in a newly written role.

Following the pattern established by earlier installments, the season introduces a new ensemble of guests and staff at a fictional outpost of the White Lotus resort chain, this time against the backdrop of the Cannes Film Festival. The season was renewed by HBO in January 2025, before the third season had begun airing. Principal photography began in April 2026 and concluded that November.

== Cast and characters ==
- Chloe Bennet as Brynn
- Sandra Bernhard
- Vincent Cassel
- Steve Coogan
- Charlie Davis
- Laura Dern
- Caleb Jonte Edwards
- Dylan Ennis
- Corentin Fila
- Heather Graham
- Ari Graynor
- Max Greenfield as Mitchell
- Frida Gustavsson
- Charlie Hall as Zach
- Kamilla Karthigesu
- Ben Kingsley
- Marissa Long
- Alexander Ludwig
- Chris Messina
- AJ Michalka
- Max Minghella
- Kumail Nanjiani
- Jarrad Paul
- Rosie Perez
- Tobias Santelmann
- Ben Schnetzer
- Laura Smet
- Pekka Strang
- Nadia Tereszkiewicz

== Production and background ==
=== Development and settings ===
HBO renewed The White Lotus for a fourth season on January 22, 2025, ahead of the third season's premiere. According to reporting in Deadline Hollywood, the idea for a fourth outing was pitched by Mike White over dinner in Phuket, Thailand, during production of season three, to HBO chairman and chief executive Casey Bloys and drama-programming executive Francesca Orsi.

=== Filming ===
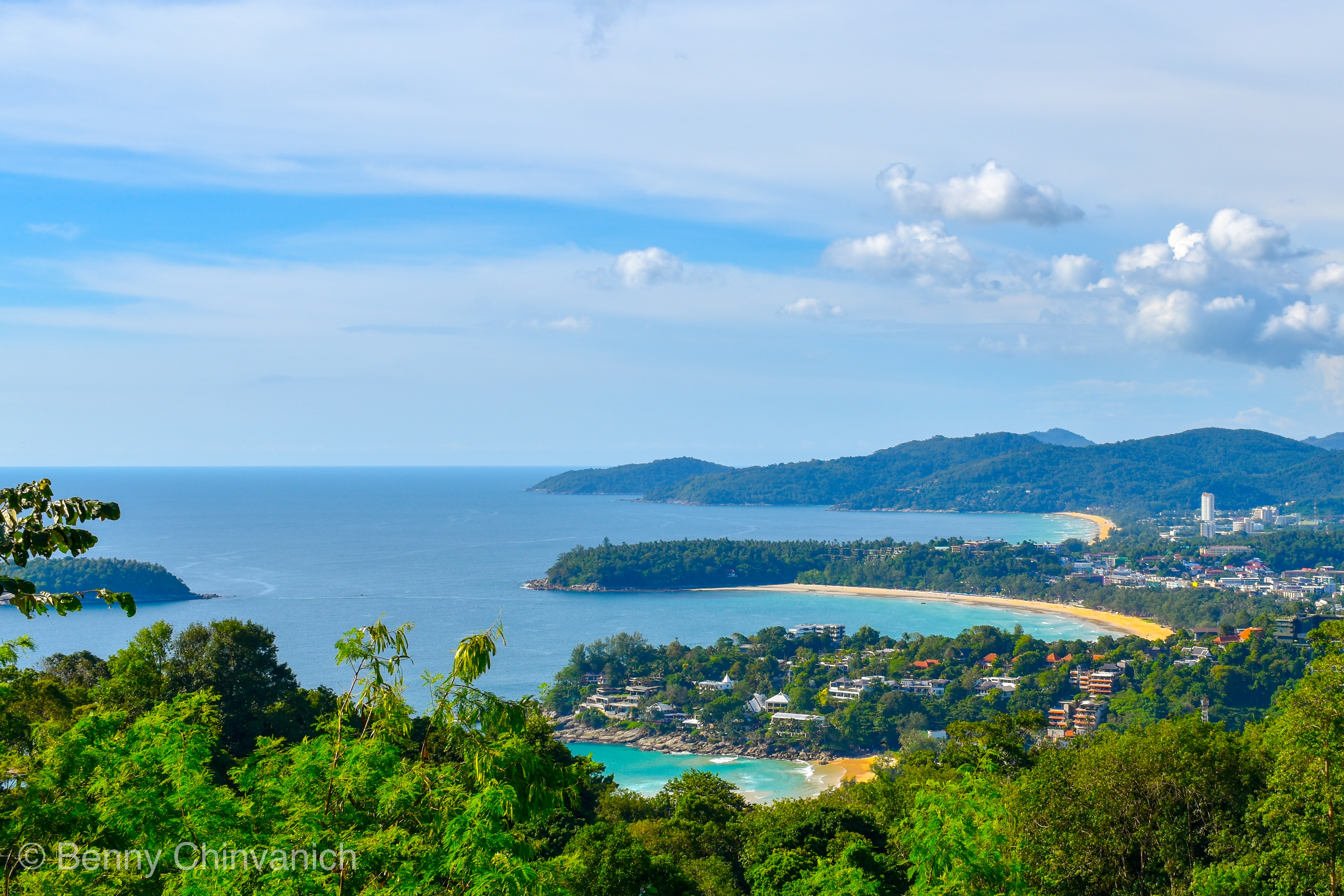
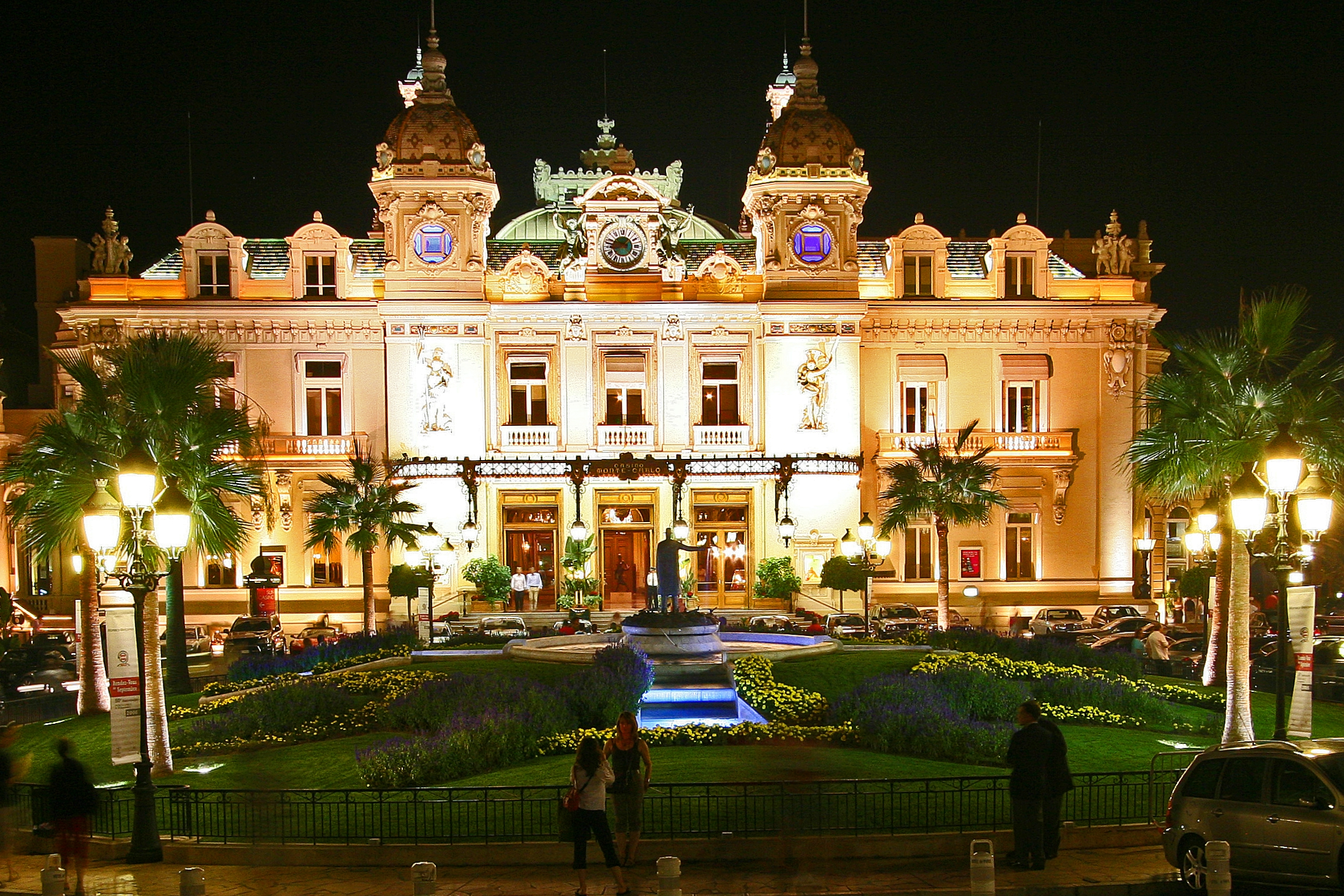
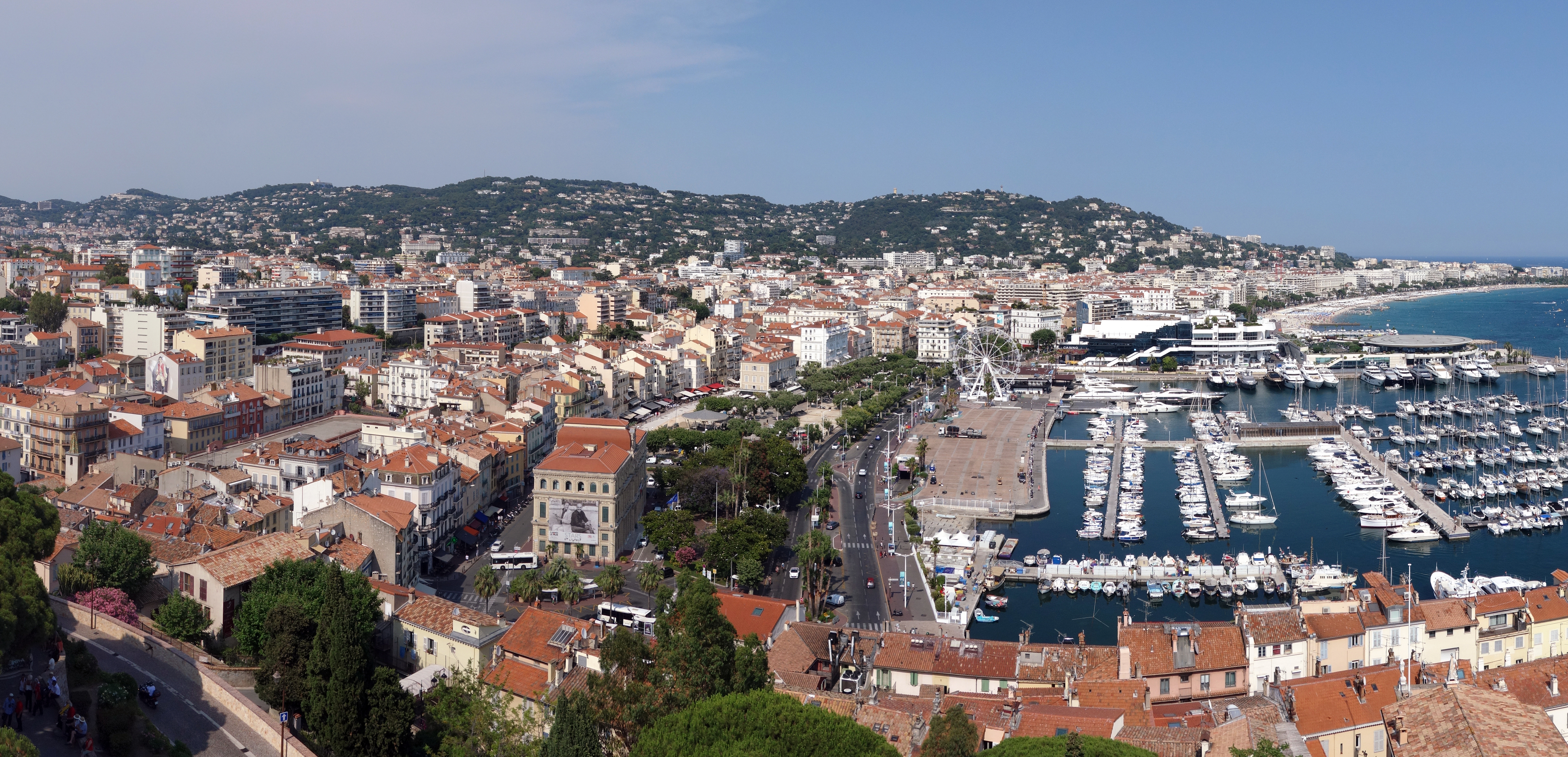
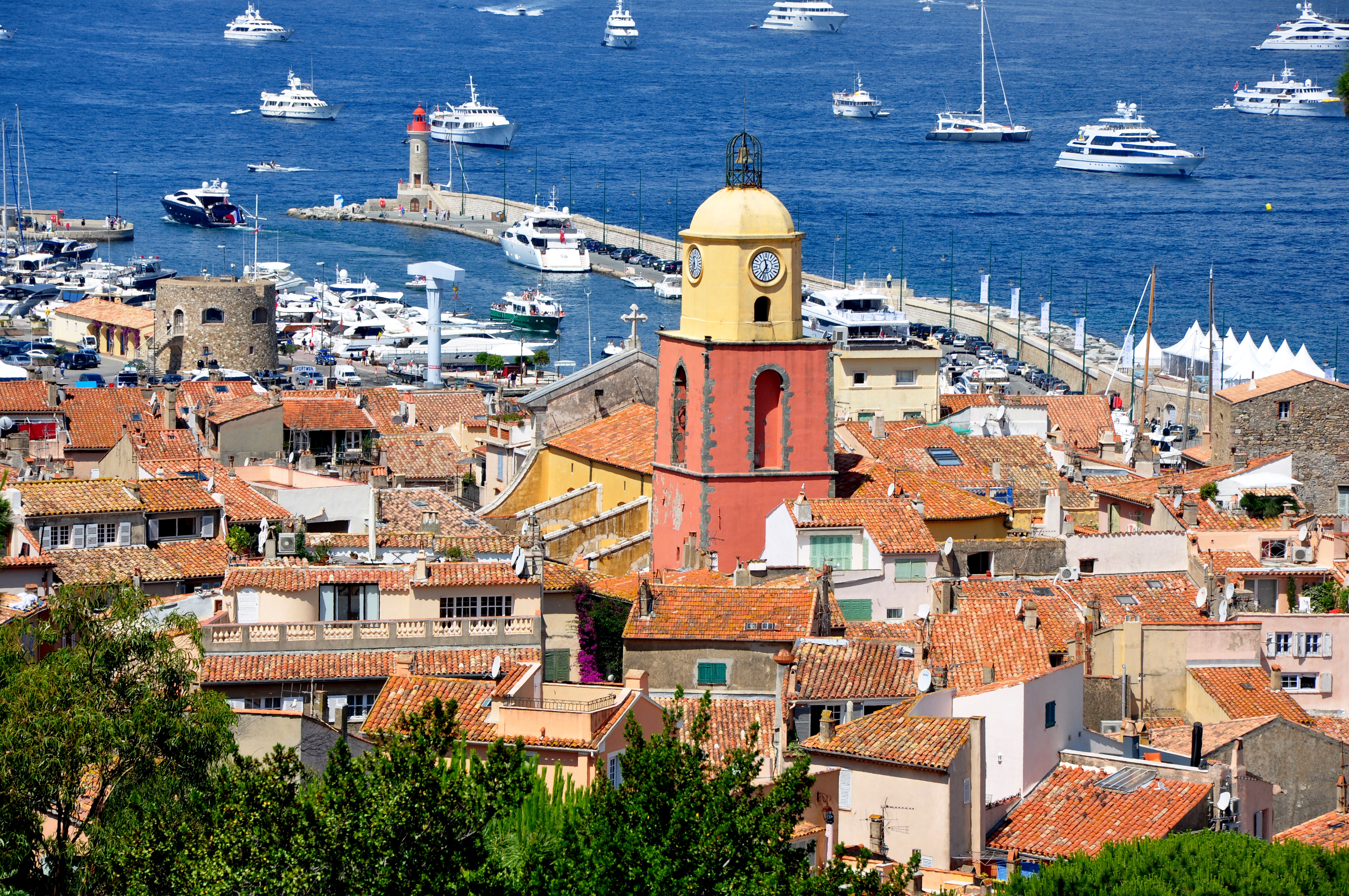
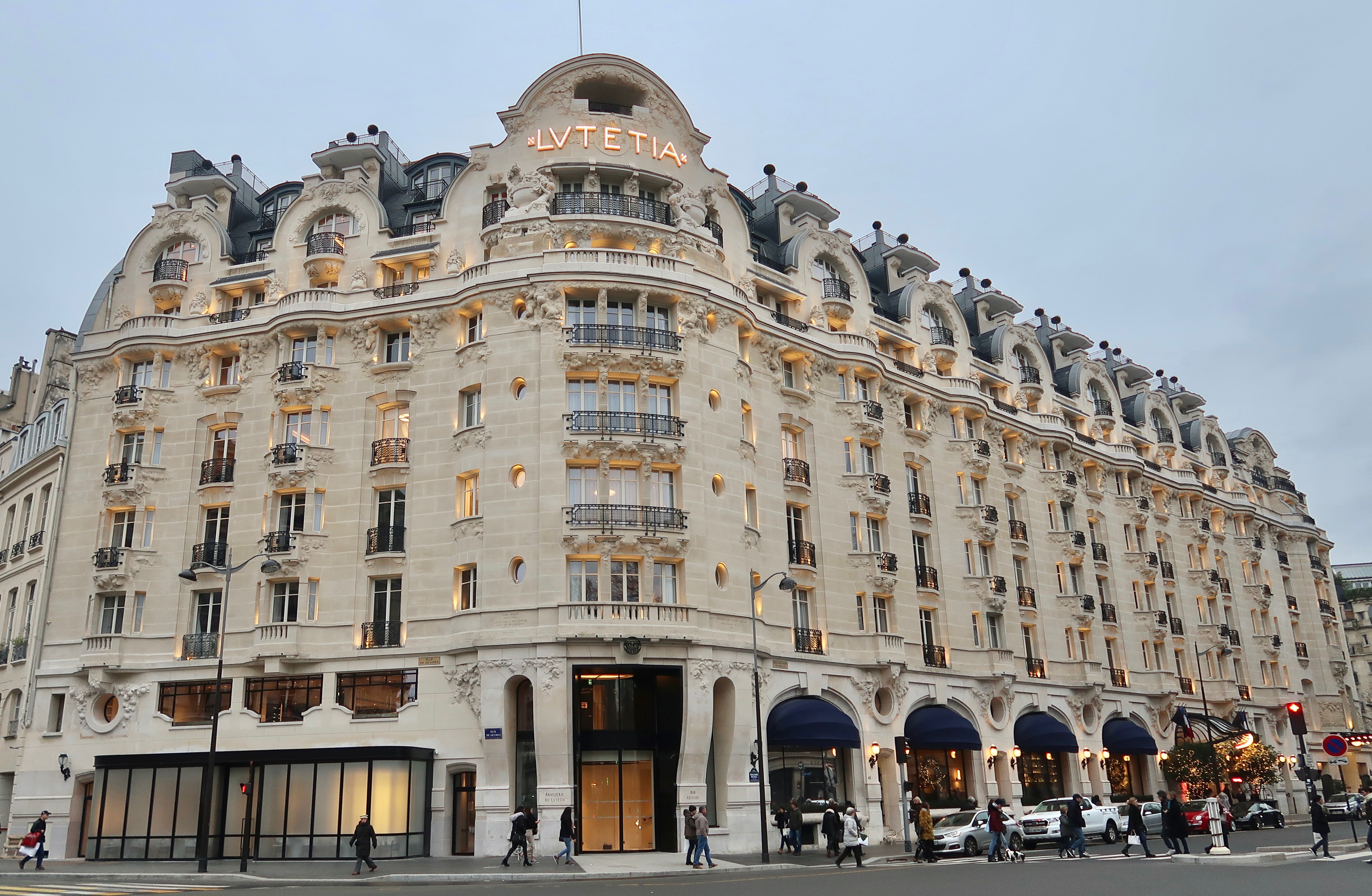
The fourth season was filmed in various locations on the French Riviera.

In November 2025, HBO confirmed that the season would be set in France, departing from the Hawaii, Sicily, and Thailand settings of the first three seasons. Production began in April 2026. This also marked a shift away from Four Seasons Hotels and Resorts, the hotel operator that had hosted every previous season; the season instead films primarily at two independently French Riviera properties.

As with previous seasons, HBO released only a limited plot synopsis, describing the season as following a new group of White Lotus hotel guests and employees over the course of a week. Season four is distinguished from earlier seasons by its explicit tie to a real-world event, the story is set during the Cannes Film Festival, and the production has said the festival's atmosphere of celebrity, publicity, and industry deal-making will factor into the season's satire.

The narrative spans multiple locations along the Côte d'Azur, including Cannes, Saint-Tropez, and Monaco, with additional scenes shot in Paris, though HBO has stated the story itself remains centered on the Riviera. Reporting from the travel-industry outlet Skift identified the two hotels standing in for the fictional resort: Hôtel Martinez, a Cannes property in Hyatt's Unbound Collection, was confirmed as the shooting location for the "White Lotus Cannes," while the Airelles-operated Château de la Messardière in Saint-Tropez was set to double as the "White Lotus du Cap". Additional filming reportedly took place at the Mandarin Oriental Lutetia in Paris. Trade press noted that the season marks the first time the series has not filmed primarily at a Four Seasons property.

In August 2026, production shifted for an extended interior shooting schedule over the summer of 2026, with sets being constructed at the studios of Bry-sur-Marne, located on the eastern edges of Paris, which had been used earlier for the Canal+ TV series Marie-Antoinette and for the Pathé period films The Count of Monte-Cristo and De Gaulle. Production then moved back to the Riviera for the last phase of production, with footage being shot from a yacht in Monaco and at the Nice airport. The production team also shot scenes at the Palais des Festivals.

=== Casting ===
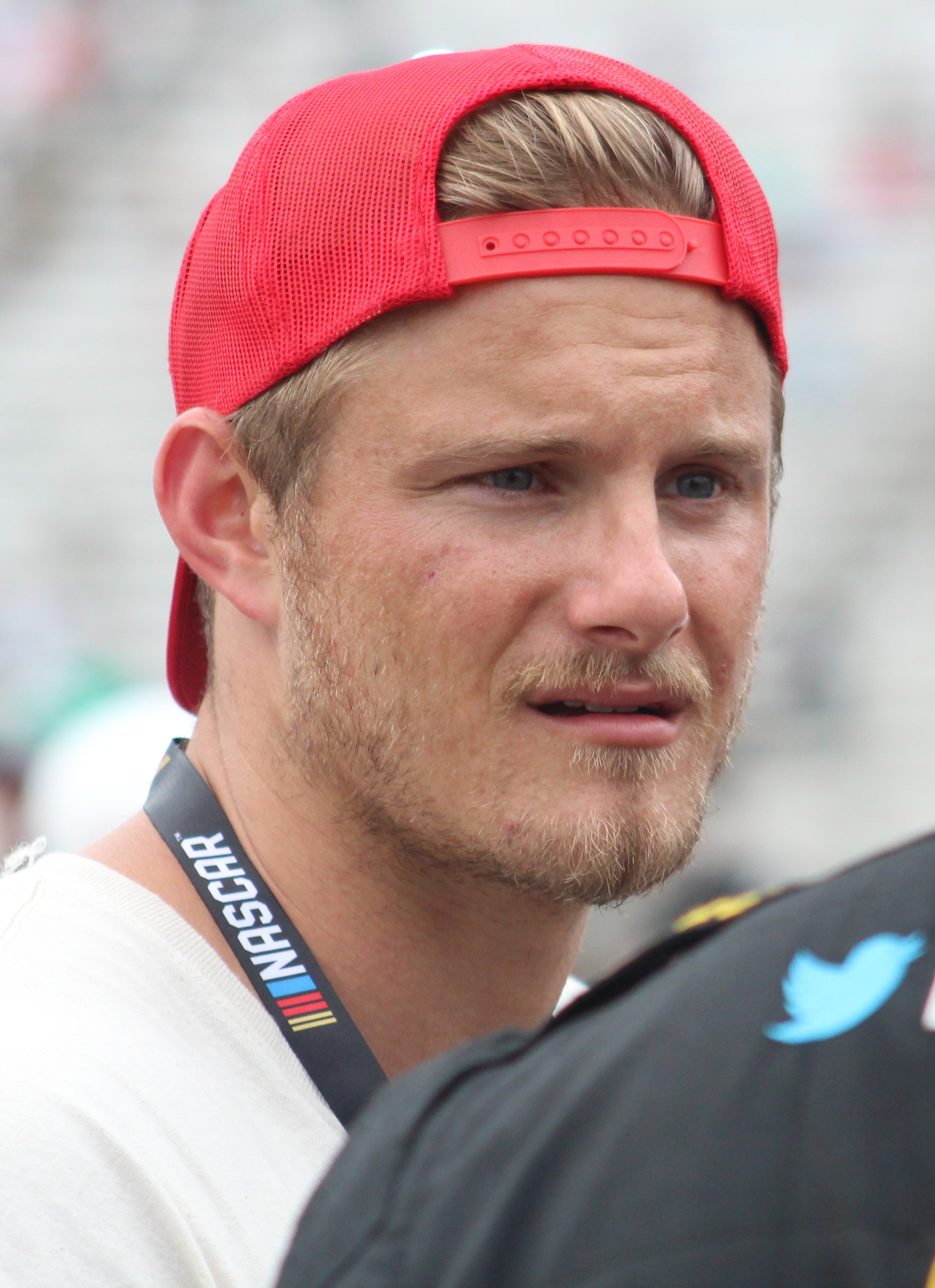
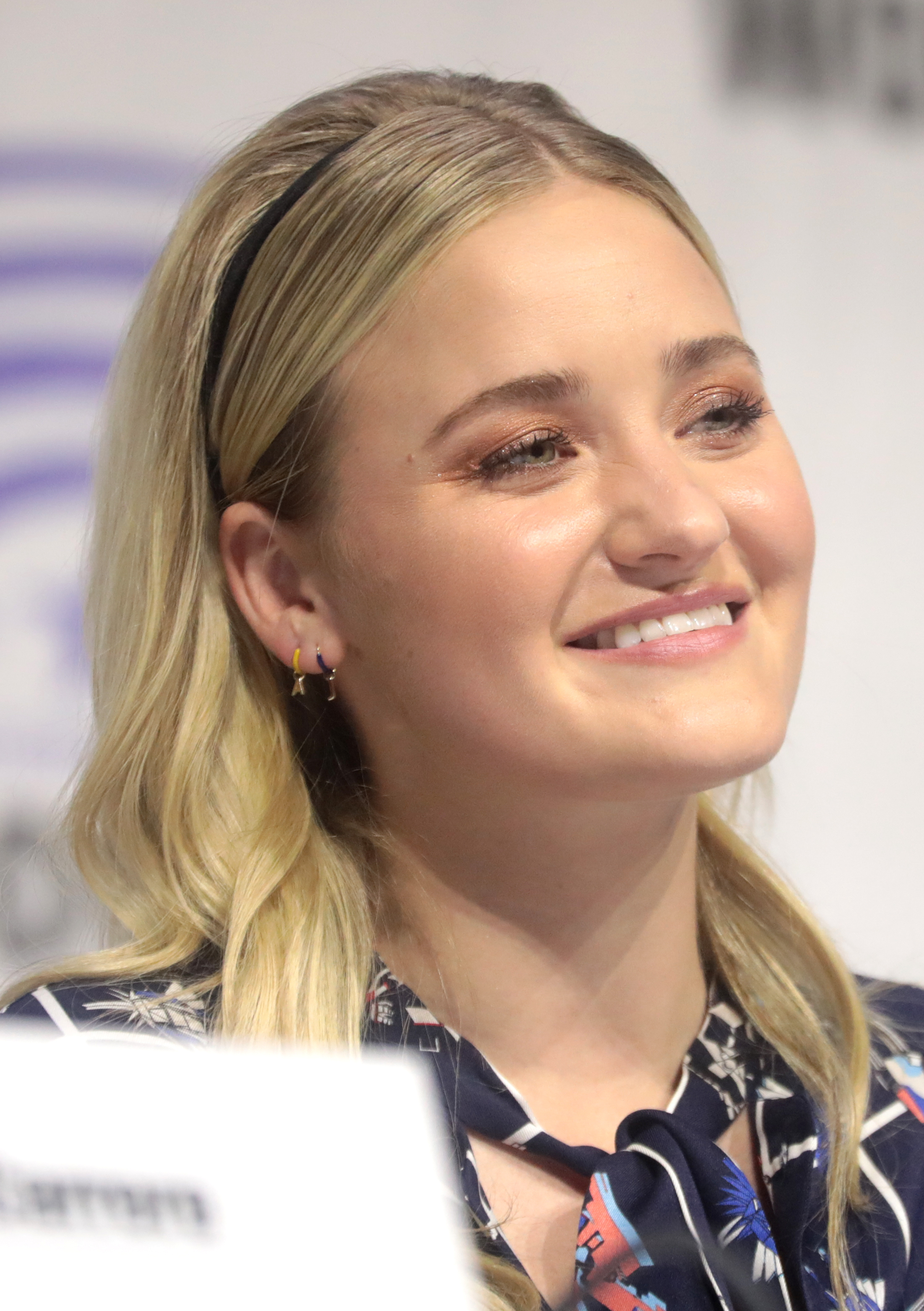
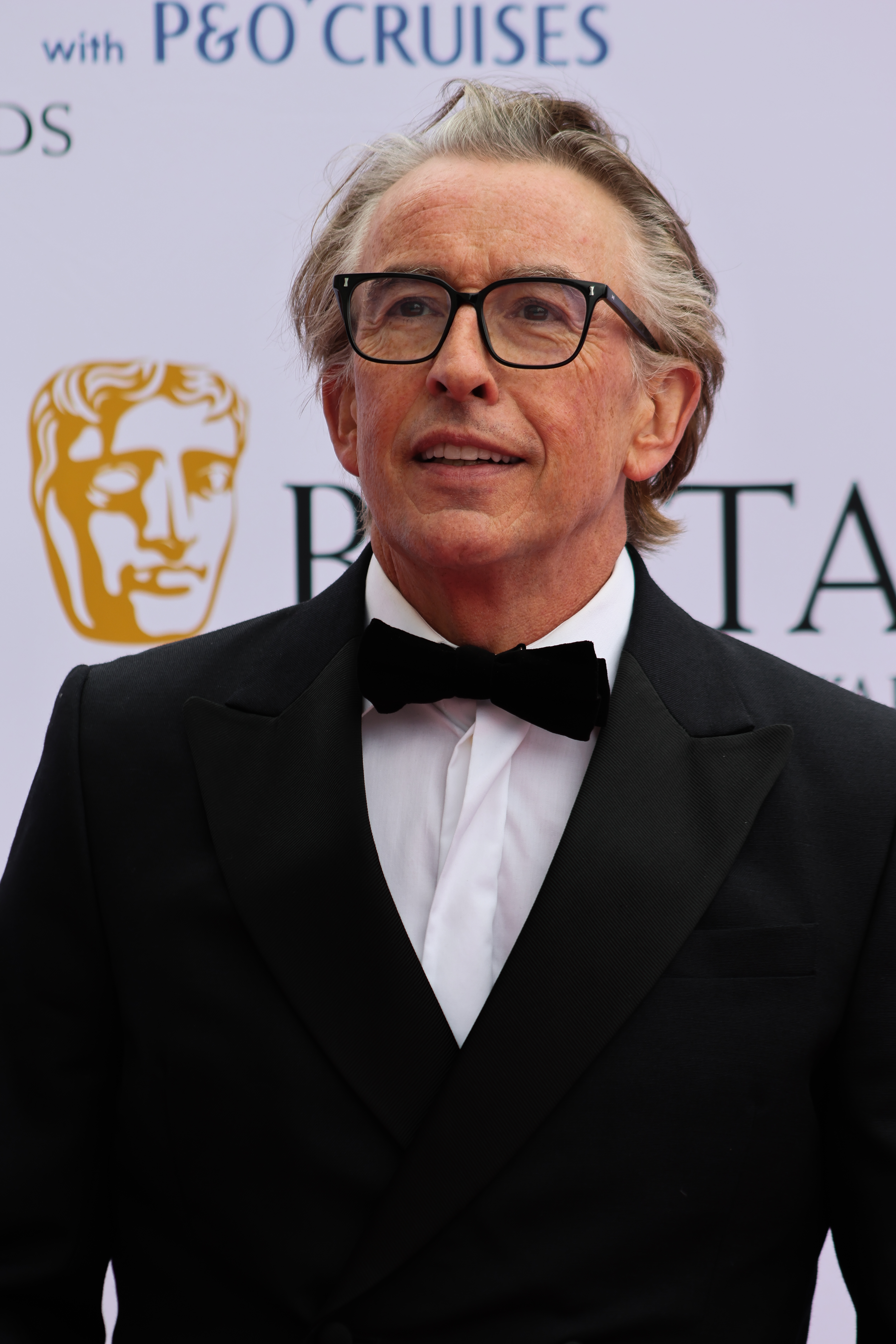
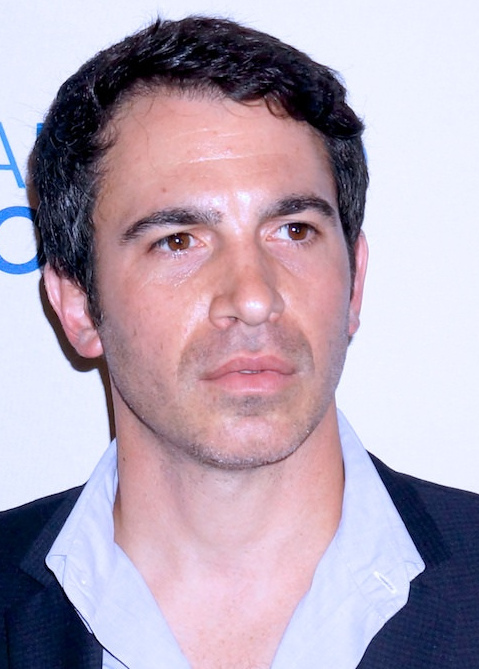
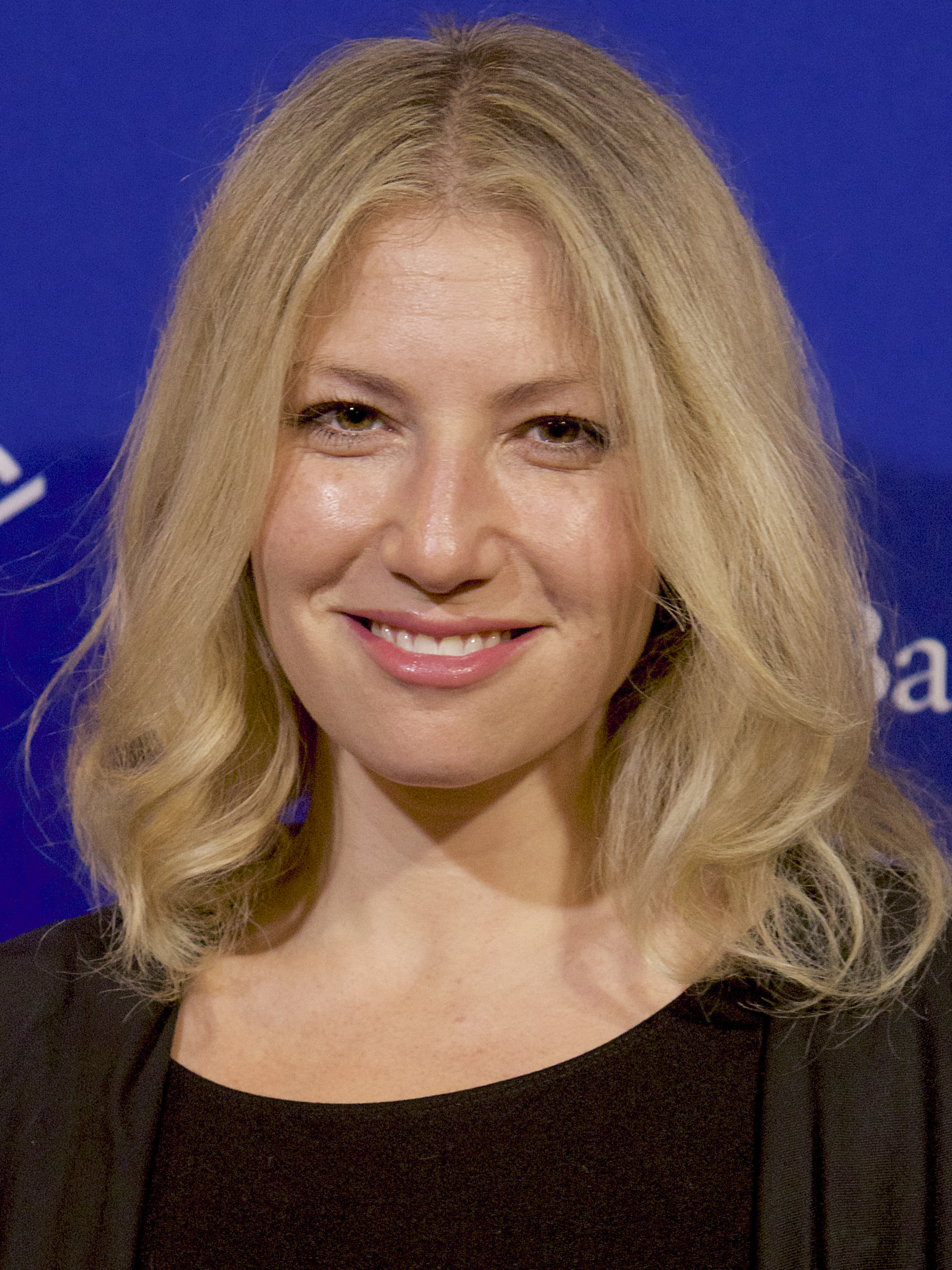
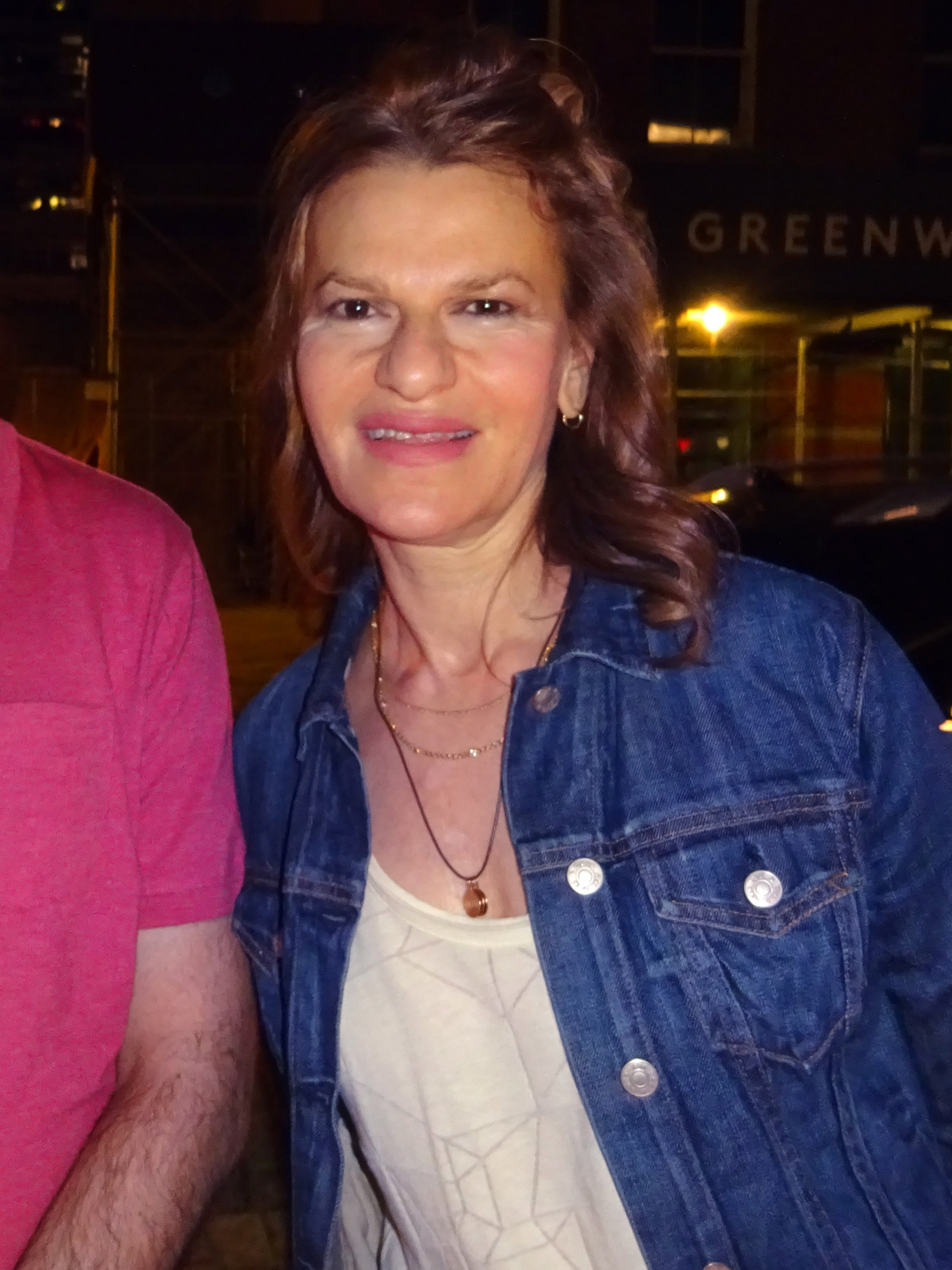
The fourth season features an ensemble cast including Alexander Ludwig, AJ Michalka, Steve Coogan, Chris Messina, Ari Graynor, and Sandra Bernhard.

HBO announced the season's cast in stages between December 2025 and May 2026, following the production's practice of paying all ensemble members the same rate and releasing casting news incrementally.

Confirmed cast members include Alexander Ludwig, AJ Michalka, Steve Coogan, Caleb Jonte Edwards, Chris Messina, Marissa Long, Sandra Bernhard, Ari Graynor, Dylan Ennis, Vincent Cassel, Corentin Fila, Nadia Tereszkiewicz, Max Greenfield, Kumail Nanjiani, Chloe Bennet, Charlie Hall, and Jarrad Paul (March 2026), Heather Graham, Rosie Perez, Ben Schnetzer, Tobias Santelmann, Frida Gustavsson, Laura Smet, Ben Kingsley, Max Minghella, and Pekka Strang, whose casting in May 2026 was described by HBO as the season's final major announcement.

Helena Bonham Carter had originally been cast in January 2026 to play a faded star seeking a career comeback but departed the production nine days after filming began in France in April 2026. According to Variety, the departure was attributed to a disagreement between Carter and White regarding the character's tone. In a statement, an HBO spokesperson said the character written for Carter "did not align once on set" and that the role would be rewritten and recast.

Shortly after filming began, Deadline Hollywood reported that White made the decision after concluding Carter's character was not working as conceived once filming was underway. Laura Dern joined the cast that same month to play a new role written specifically for her; Dern had previously provided an uncredited voice cameo in season two. Later in May 2026, during the live finale of the reality competition series Survivor's fiftieth season, White announced that two contestants from that season, Charlie Davis and Kamilla Karthigesu, would make appearances in season four.
