= Bill Maher: Is Anyone Else Seeing This? =

- Genre: Stand-up comedy
- Written by: Bill Maher
- Starring: Bill Maher
- Country of origin: United States
- Original language: English

Original release
- Network: HBO
- Release: 2025

Bill Maher: Is Anyone Else Seeing This? is a 2025 HBO stand-up comedy special starring Bill Maher.

== Critical reception ==
MSNBC said of Maher's performance "His bits seemed predictable and ranting. The jokes have a formulaic quality. The punchlines land on the same beat over and again."

Salon.com wrote "Maher's supposedly new-ish persona is that of an “old-school liberal” gunning for the left's “wokeness," which he's told The Wall Street Journal is "a gold mine for comedy.” And you know what? He's not wrong. Take it from someone who lives in one of the bluest and whitest cities in the country. On the daily, I encounter cars covered in more "Coexist," Phishy-lefty stickers than scales on a carp and assume their drivers are serving a level of crunchiness I am never in the mood to chew on. Left-wing quackery is a target-rich environment for jokes. Wouldn’t it be tremendous if Maher told some?"
