= Public broadcasting =

Electronic media outlets whose primary mission is public service

Public broadcasting (or public service broadcasting) is radio, television, and other electronic media whose primary mission is public service with a commitment to avoiding political and commercial influence. Public broadcasters receive funding from public financing, license fees, individual contributions and donations, commercial advertising and corporate underwriting.

A public service broadcaster should operate as a non-partisan entity, guided by a clear public interest mandate and avoid media bias or political bias. Public service broadcasters should be safeguarded from external interference—especially of a political or commercial nature—in matters related to governance, budgeting, and editorial decision-making, typically as a non-profit entity. The public service broadcasting model relies on an independent and transparent system of governance, encompassing key areas such as editorial policy, managerial appointments, and financial oversight.

Common media include AM, FM, and shortwave radio; television; and the Internet. Public broadcasting may be nationally or locally operated, depending on the country and the station. In some countries a single organization runs public broadcasting. Other countries have multiple public-broadcasting organizations operating regionally or in different languages. Historically, public broadcasting was once the dominant or only form of broadcasting in many countries (with the notable exceptions of the United States, Mexico, and Brazil).

== Definition ==
The primary mission of public broadcasting is that of public service, speaking to and engaging as a citizen. The British model is often referenced in definitions. The model embodies the following principles:

- Universal geographic accessibility
- Universal appeal
- Attention to minorities ("special provision for minorities")
- Contribution to national identity and sense of community
- Distance from vested interests
- Direct funding and universality of payment
- Encourage competition "in good programming rather than competition for numbers"
- Guidelines that liberate rather than restrict

While the application of certain principles may be straightforward, as in the case of accessibility, some of the principles may be poorly defined or difficult to implement. In the context of a shifting national identity, the role of public broadcasting may be unclear. Likewise, the subjective nature of good programming may raise the question of individual or public taste.

Within public broadcasting there are two different views regarding commercial activity. One is that public broadcasting is incompatible with commercial objectives. The other is that public broadcasting can and should compete in the marketplace with commercial broadcasters. This dichotomy is highlighted by the public service aspects of traditional commercial broadcasters. Public broadcasters in each jurisdiction may or may not be synonymous with government controlled broadcasters.

=== Cultural policy ===
Additionally, public broadcasting may facilitate the implementation of a cultural policy (an industrial policy and investment policy for culture). Examples include:

- In Australia, the Australian Broadcasting Corporation is legally required to 'encourage and promote the musical, dramatic and other performing arts in Australia' and 'broadcasting programmes that contribute to a sense of national identity' with specific emphasis on regional and rural Australia'. Furthermore, the Special Broadcasting Service (SBS) is intended to reflect the spirit and sense of multicultural richness and the unique international cultural values within Australian society.

== Etymology ==
Who exactly coined the term "public broadcasting" is disputed. Various sources credit Morris S. Novik, who served 20 years as station manager for New York City's WNYC, the Carnegie Commission on the Future of Public Broadcasting, and the Rocky Mountain Radio Council.

== Operating structures ==
When television started out in many countries in the 1960's, the reliance on analogue terrestrial television severely limited the number of possible TV channels in a geographical area, and many countries only had 1 or 2 channels until well into the 1980's. As such, there were heavy differences between countries' approaches during that time on how to operate those channels, including:

- 1 channel operated by 1 company (NRK in Norway; previously RTÉ in Republic of Ireland until 1978).
- 2 channels operated by 1 company (BBC; SVT in Sweden).
- Regional public broadcasters co-operating to create national channels (Das Erste in Germany).
- Regional public broadcasters with no national co-operations (VRT and RTBF in Belgium, which later also included BRT).
- 1 or 2 channels with timeslots allocated to various broadcaster companies (NPO in The Netherlands; previously Yle in Finland).
- Local public broadcasters co-operating to create national channels (PBS in the United States).

As digital satellite television and analogue (and later digital) cable television became broadly available in large parts of Europe and elsewhere in the 1980's, which both opened up more channel frequencies for existing public broadcasters and made foreign-based commercial channels like Sky Television available even in countries that didn't allow them at the time, the public broadcasters' operating structures became less strict, though many of their core structures remain in for instance Germany and The Netherlands as of 2025.

== Economics ==
Public broadcasters may receive their funding from an obligatory television licence fee, individual contributions, government funding or commercial sources. Public broadcasters do not rely on advertising to the same degree as commercial broadcasters, or at all; this allows public broadcasters to transmit programmes that are not commercially viable to the mass market, such as public affairs shows, radio and television documentaries, and educational programmes.

One of the principles of public broadcasting is to provide coverage of interests for which there are missing or small markets. Public broadcasting attempts to supply topics of social benefit that are otherwise not provided by commercial broadcasters. Typically, such underprovision is argued to exist when the benefits to viewers are relatively high in comparison to the benefits to advertisers from contacting viewers. This frequently is the case in undeveloped countries that normally have low benefits to advertising.

An alternative funding model proposed by Michael Slaby is to give every citizen credits they can use to pay qualified media sources for civic information and reporting. In the early 2020s, many of the public international broadcasters that court audiences abroad have seen their budgets shrink, with the exception of Deutsche Welle, while state media outlets from authoritarian countries like Russia, China, and Iran have been increasing their budgets since the early 2000s.

== Select examples ==
=== Brazil ===
In Brazil, the two main national broadcasters are Empresa Brasil de Comunicação (EBC) and the Fundação Padre Anchieta (FPA). EBC was created in 2007 to manage the Brazilian federal government's radio and television stations. EBC owns broadcast the television channel TV Brasil (launched in 2007, being the merger of TVE Brasil, launched in Rio de Janeiro in 1975, and TV Nacional, launched in Brasilia in 1960), the radio stations Rádio Nacional and Rádio MEC, broadcast to Brasilia, Rio de Janeiro, São Paulo, Belo Horizonte, Recife, and Tabatinga, Rádio Nacional da Amazônia, a shortwave radio station based in Brasília with programming aimed to the population of the Amazon region, and Agência Brasil, a news agency. Starting in 2021, EBC expanded the coverage of its radio stations through the new FM extended band to the metropolitan areas of São Paulo, Belo Horizonte and Recife, important Brazilian regions which did not have EBC radio stations.

Fundação Padre Anchieta is a non-profit foundation created by the government of the state of São Paulo in 1967 and includes a national educational public television network (TV Cultura, launched in 1969 in São Paulo, which is available in all Brazilian states through its 135 affiliates), two radio stations (Rádio Cultura FM and Rádio Cultura Brasil, both broadcasting to Greater São Paulo), two educational TV channels aimed at distance education (TV Educação and Univesp TV, which is available on free-to-air digital TV in São Paulo and nationally by cable and satellite), and the children's TV channel TV Rá-Tim-Bum, available nationally on pay TV.

Many Brazilian states also have regional and statewide public radio and television stations. One example is Minas Gerais, which has the EMC (Empresa Mineira de Comunicação), a public corporation created in 2016 modelled on EBC, formed by Rede Minas, a statewide television network and the two stations of Rádio Inconfidência, which operates in AM, FM and shortwave; in the state of Pará, the state-funded foundation FUNTELPA (Fundação Paraense de Radiodifusão) operates the public educational state-wide television network Rede Cultura do Pará (which covers the entire state of Pará, reaching many cities of Brazilian Amazon) and Rádio Cultura, a public radio station which broadcasts in FM for Belém. The state of Espírito Santo has the RTV-ES (Rádio e Televisão Espírito Santo), with its television channel TVE-ES (TV Educativa do Espírito Santo) and an AM radio station (Rádio Espírito Santo), and in Rio Grande do Sul, the state-wide public television channel TVE-RS (TV Educativa do Rio Grande do Sul) and the public radio station FM Cultura (which broadcasts for Porto Alegre metropolitan area) are the two public broadcasters in the state. Regional public television channels in Brazil often broadcast part of TV Brasil or TV Cultura programming among with some hours of local programming.

Since the government of Michel Temer, EBC has received several criticism from some politicians for having an alleged political bias. The president of Brazil from 2019 to 2022, Jair Bolsonaro, said in his campaign for the presidential election in 2018 that the public broadcaster is allegedly a "job hanger" (public company existing only for the purpose of securing positions for political allies) and has proposed to privatize or extinguish the public company. On April 9, 2021, the president inserted the public company into the National Privatization Program, with the intention of carrying out studies about the possibility of privatization of the public broadcaster. Some states often had problems with their public broadcasting services. In São Paulo, FPA had sometimes dealt with budget cuts, labor disputes and strikes. In Rio Grande do Sul, TVE-RS and FM Cultura were managed by the Piratini Foundation, a non-profit state foundation. However, due to the public debt crisis in the state, in 2018, the Piratini Foundation had its activities closed, and TVE-RS and FM Cultura started to be managed by the Secretariat of Communication of the state government. Brazil also has many campus radio and community radio stations and several educational local TV channels (many of them belonging to public and private universities).

=== Canada ===
In Canada, the main public broadcaster is the national Canadian Broadcasting Corporation (CBC; French: Société Radio-Canada), a crown corporation – which originated as a radio network in November 1936. It is the successor to the Canadian Radio Broadcasting Commission (CRBC), which was established by the administration of Prime Minister R.B. Bennett in 1932, modeled on recommendations made in 1929 by the Royal Commission on Radio Broadcasting and stemming from lobbying efforts by the Canadian Radio League. The Canadian Broadcasting Corporation took over operation of the CRBC's nine radio stations (which were largely concentrated in major cities across Canada, including Toronto, Vancouver, Montreal, and Ottawa). The CBC eventually expanded to television in September 1952 with the sign-on of CBFT in Montreal; CBFT was the first television station in Canada to initiate full-time broadcasts, which initially served as a primary affiliate of the French language Télévision de Radio-Canada and a secondary affiliate of the English language CBC Television service.

CBC operates two national television networks (CBC Television and Ici Radio-Canada Télé), four radio networks (CBC Radio One, CBC Radio 2, Ici Radio-Canada Première, and Ici Musique) and several cable television channels including two 24-hour news channels (CBC News Network and Ici RDI) in both of Canada's official languages – English and French – and the French-language channels Ici Explora and Ici ARTV, dedicated to science and culture respectively. CBC's national television operations and some radio operations are funded partly by advertisements, in addition to the subsidy provided by the federal government. The cable channels are commercial entities owned and operated by the CBC and do not receive any direct public funds, however, they do benefit from synergies with resources from the other CBC operations. The CBC has frequently dealt with budget cuts and labour disputes, often resulting in a debate about whether the service has the resources necessary to properly fulfill its mandate.

As of 2017, all of CBC Television's terrestrial stations are owned and operated by the CBC directly. The number of privately owned CBC Television affiliates has gradually declined in recent years, as the network has moved its programming to stations opened by the corporation or has purchased certain affiliates from private broadcasting groups; budgetary issues led the CBC to choose not to launch new rebroadcast transmitters in markets where the network disaffiliated from a private station after 2006; the network dropped its remaining private affiliates in 2016, when CJDC-TV—Dawson Creek and CFTK-TV—Terrace, British Columbia defected from CBC Television that February and Lloydminster-based CKSA-DT disaffiliated in August of that year (to become affiliates of CTV Two and Global, respectively). The CBC's decision to disaffiliate from these and other privately owned stations, as well as the corporation decommissioning its network of rebroadcasters following Canada's transition to digital television in August 2011 have significantly reduced the terrestrial coverage of both CBC Television and Ici Radio-Canada Télé; the Canadian Radio-television and Telecommunications Commission (CRTC) does require cable, satellite and IPTV providers to carry CBC and Radio-Canada stations as part of their basic tier, regardless of terrestrial availability in an individual market. Of the three major French-language television networks in Canada, Ici Radio-Canada Télé is the only one that maintains terrestrial owned-and-operated stations and affiliates in all ten Canadian provinces, although it maintains only one station (Moncton, New Brunswick-based CBAFT-DT) that serves the four provinces comprising Atlantic Canada.

In recent years, the CBC has also expanded into new media ventures including the online radio service CBC Radio 3, music streaming service CBC Music, and the launch of online news services, such as CBC Hamilton, in some markets which are not directly served by their own CBC television or radio stations. In addition, several provinces operate public broadcasters; these are not CBC subentities, but distinct networks in their own right. Most of the provincial services maintain an educational programming format, differing from the primarily entertainment-based CBC/Radio-Canada operations, but more closely formatted to (and carrying many of the same programs as) the U.S.-based Public Broadcasting Service (PBS), which itself is available terrestrially and – under a CRTC rule that requires Canadian cable, satellite and IPTV providers to carry affiliates of the four major U.S. commercial networks (ABC, NBC, CBS and Fox) and a PBS member station – through pay television providers in Canada via member stations located near the U.S.–Canada border. These educational public broadcasters include the English-language TVOntario (TVO) and the French-language TFO in Ontario, Télé-Québec in Quebec, and Knowledge Network in British Columbia. TVO and Télé-Québec operate through conventional transmitters and cable, while TFO and Knowledge Network are cable-only channels. Beyond these and other provincial services, Canada does not have a national public educational network.

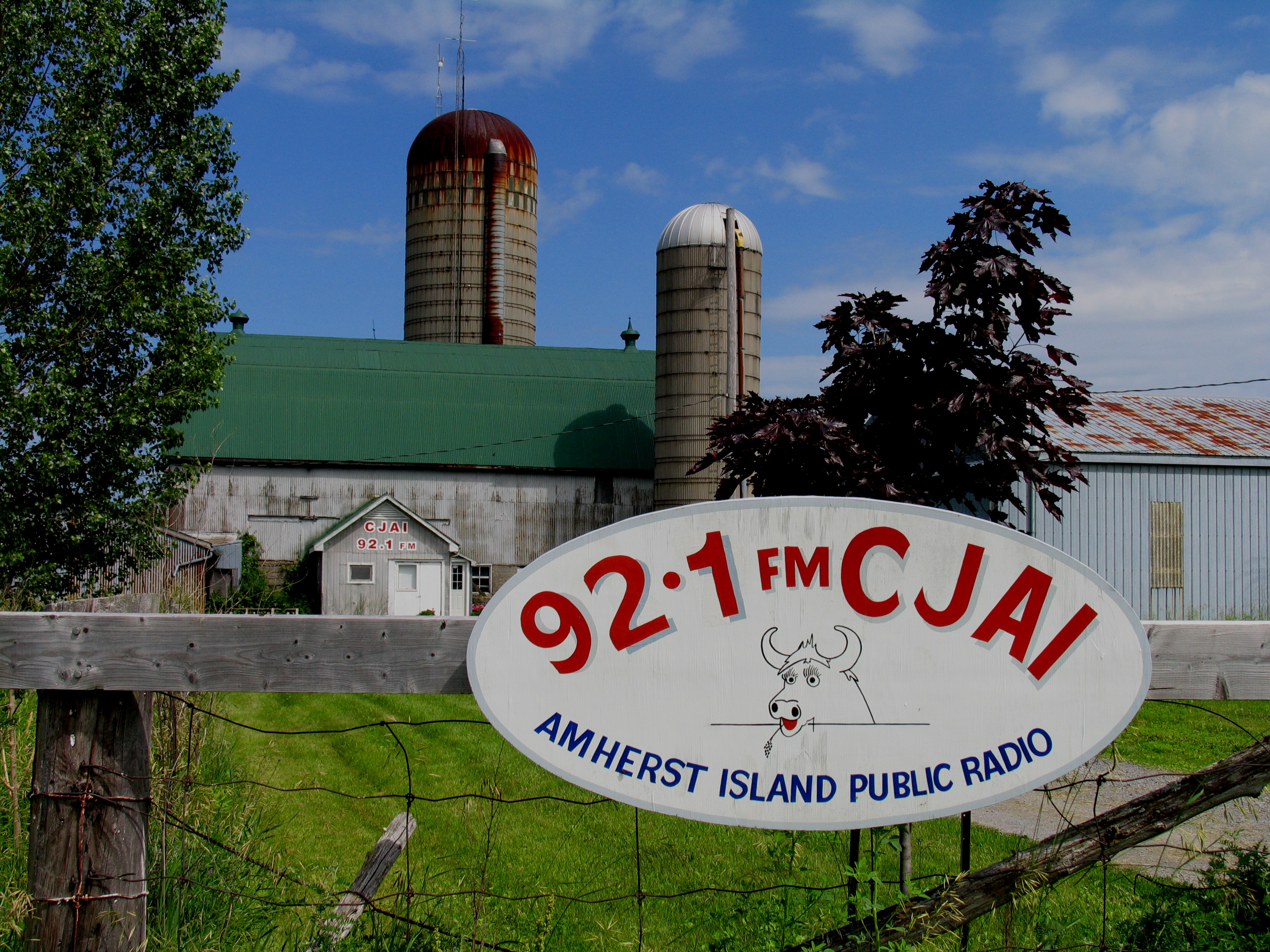
Amherst Island public radio

Canada is also home to a number of former public broadcasting entities that have gone private. CTV2 Alberta, which was licensed as an educational television station in Alberta until 2017, was once owned by the Alberta government as the public broadcaster Access. In 1993, the provincial government agreed to cease to direct funding of Access after the 1994 fiscal year; the channel was sold to CHUM Limited in 1995, which initially acquired the channel through a majority-owned subsidiary, Learning and Skills Television of Alberta Limited (LSTA). As CTV2 Alberta was previously licensed as an educational station, the service previously broadcast educational and children's programming during the daytime hours and entertainment programming in the evenings; it would abandon the educational format altogether in 2017 in favor of carrying the full CTV2 schedule. The service discontinued its broadcast transmitters in Calgary and Edmonton in August 2011, due to the expense of transitioning the two stations to digital, and the fact that the service had mandatory carriage on television providers serving Alberta regardless of whether it ran over-the-air transmitters. The service has since operated as part of Bell Media's CTV2 chain of stations.

Public radio station CKUA in Alberta was also formerly operated by Access, before being sold to the non-profit CKUA Radio Foundation which continues to operate it as a community-funded radio network. CJRT-FM in Toronto also operated as a public government-owned radio station for many years; while no longer funded by the provincial government, it still solicits most of its budget from listener and corporate donations and is permitted to air only a very small amount of commercial advertising.

Citytv Saskatchewan originated as the Saskatchewan Communications Network, a cable-only educational and cultural public broadcaster owned by the government of Saskatchewan. SCN was sold to Bluepoint Investment Corporation in 2010, and like CTV Two Alberta did when it became privatized, incorporated a limited schedule of entertainment programming during the late afternoon and nighttime hours, while retaining educational and children's programs during the morning until mid-afternoon to fulfill its licensing conditions; Bluepoint later sold the channel to Rogers Media in 2012, expanding a relationship it began with SCN in January of that year, when Rogers began supplying entertainment programming to the channel through an affiliation agreement with its English-language broadcast network, Citytv. One television station, CFTU in Montreal, operates as an educational station owned by CANAL (French: Corporation pour l'Avancement de Nouvelles Applications des Langages Ltée, lit. 'Corporation for the Advancement of New Language Applications Ltd.'), a private not-for-profit consortium of educational institutions in the province of Quebec.

Some local community stations also operate non-commercially with funding from corporate and individual donors. In addition, cable companies are required to produce a local community channel in each licensed market. Such channels have traditionally aired community talk shows, city council meetings and other locally oriented programming, although it is becoming increasingly common for them to adopt the format and branding of a local news channel. Canada also has a large number of campus radio and community radio stations.

=== United States ===
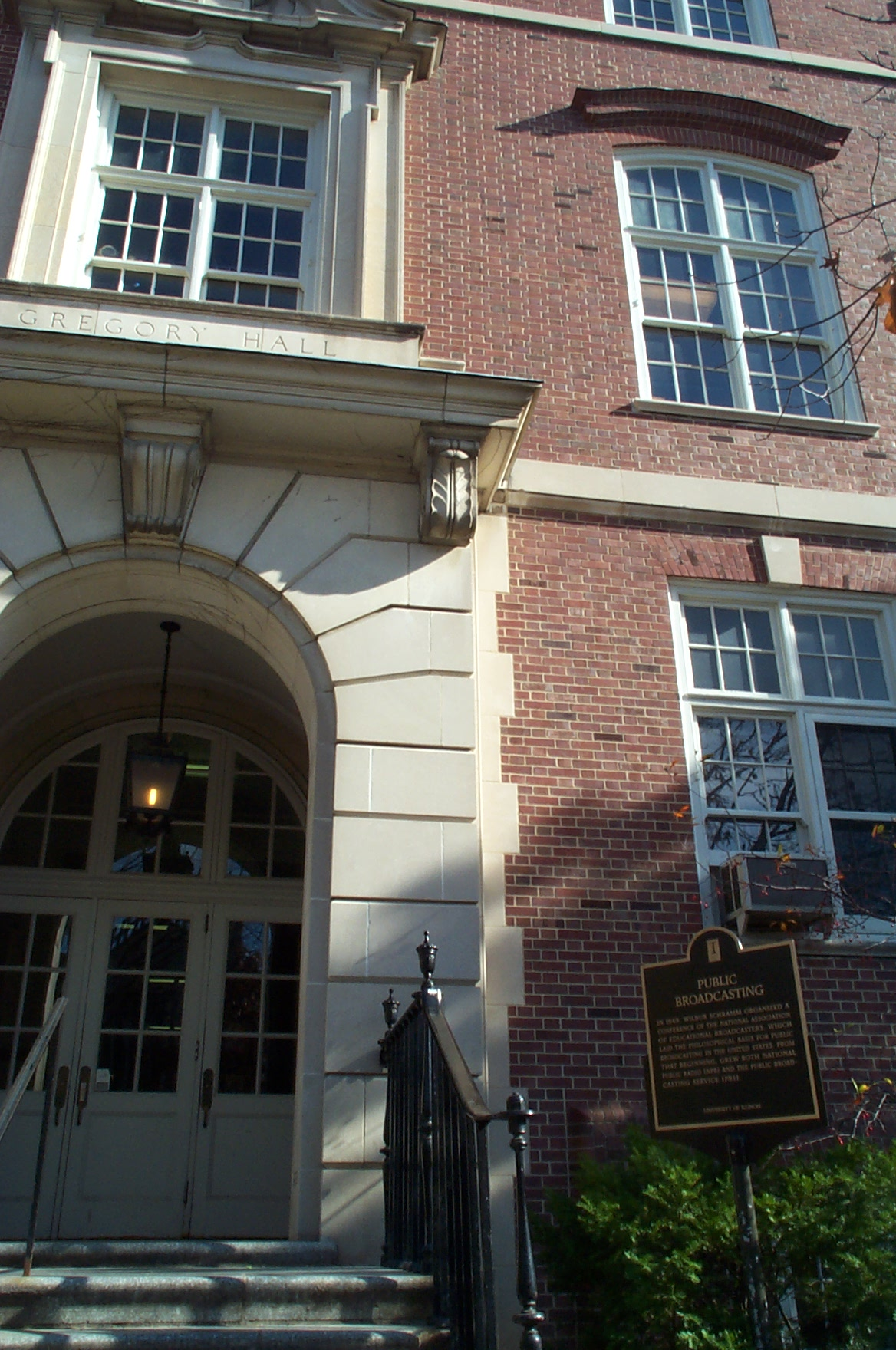
The Gregory Hall on the campus of University of Illinois at Urbana–Champaign hosted an important meeting of the National Association of Educational Broadcasters in the 1940s, that spawned both PBS and NPR.

In the United States, public broadcasters may receive some funding from both federal and state sources, but generally most of their financial support comes from underwriting by foundations and businesses (ranging from small shops to corporations), along with audience contributions via pledge drives. Many are owned or overseen by not-for-profit corporations, university boards or other local license holders.

==== History ====
Early public stations were operated by state colleges and universities and were often run as part of the schools' cooperative extension services. Stations in this era were internally funded, and did not rely on listener contributions to operate, some accepted advertising. Networks such as Iowa Public Radio, South Dakota Public Radio, and Wisconsin Public Radio began under this structure. The concept of a "non-commercial, educational" station per se did not show up in U.S. law until 1941, when the FM band was authorized to begin normal broadcasting. Houston's KUHT was the nation's first public television station founded by Dr. John W. Meaney, and signed on the air on May 25, 1953, from the campus of the University of Houston. In rural areas, it was not uncommon for colleges to operate commercial stations instead (e.g., the University of Missouri's KOMU, an NBC-affiliated television station in Columbia). The FCC had reserved almost 250 broadcast frequencies for use as educational television stations in 1953, though by 1960, only 44 stations allocated for educational use had begun operations.

The passage of the Public Broadcasting Act of 1967 precipitated the development of the current public broadcasting system in the U.S. The legislation established the Corporation for Public Broadcasting (CPB), a private entity that is charged with facilitating programming diversity among public broadcasters, the development and expansion of non-commercial broadcasting, and providing funding to local stations to help them create programs; the CPB receives funding earmarked by the federal government as well as through public and private donations.

Public television and radio in the U.S. have, from the late 1960s onward, dealt with severe criticism from conservative politicians and think tanks (such as The Heritage Foundation), which allege that its programming has a leftist bias and there have been successful attempts to reduce – though not eliminate – funding for public television stations by some state legislatures.

In May 2025, President Donald Trump signed Executive Order 14290, which directed the CPB to halt funding to NPR and PBS due to the "bias" in their reporting. This was followed by the passage and signing of the Rescissions Act of 2025, which clawed back $1.1 billion in funding for the CPB. Because of this, the organization announced that it would begin the process of shutting down at the end of the fiscal year on September 30, 2025, laying off the majority of its staff, with a skeleton crew remaining until the following January in order to distribute the remainder of its funding.

==== Radio ====
The first public radio network in the United States was founded in 1949 in Berkeley, California, as station KPFA, which became and remains the flagship station for a national network called Pacifica Radio. From the beginning, the network has refused corporate funding of any kind, and has relied mainly on listener support. KPFA gave away free FM radios to build a listener base and to encourage listeners to "subscribe" (support the station directly with donations). It is the world's oldest listener-supported radio network. Since the creation of the Corporation for Public Broadcasting, Pacifica has sometimes received CPB support. Pacifica runs other stations in Los Angeles, New York City, Washington, D.C., and Houston, as well as repeater stations and a large network of affiliates.

A national public radio network, National Public Radio (NPR), was created in February 1970, following the passage of the Public Broadcasting Act of 1967. This network replaced the Ford Foundation–backed National Educational Radio Network. Some independent local public radio stations buy their programming from distributors such as NPR; Public Radio International (PRI); American Public Media (APM); the Public Radio Exchange (PRX); and Pacifica Radio, most often distributed through the Public Radio Satellite System. Cultural Native American and Mexican American music and programming are also featured regionally. NPR is colloquially though inaccurately conflated with public radio as a whole, when in fact "public radio" includes many organizations.

==== Television ====
In the United States, the Public Broadcasting Service (PBS) serves as the nation's main public television provider. When it launched in October 1970, PBS assumed many of the functions of its predecessor, National Educational Television (NET). NET was shut down by the Ford Foundation and the Corporation for Public Broadcasting after the network refused to stop airing documentaries on varying social issues that had alienated many of the network's affiliates. PBS would later acquire Educational Television Stations, an organization founded by the National Association of Educational Broadcasters (NAEB), in 1973.

=== Middle East ===
==== Israel ====
In Israel, the Israeli Broadcasting Authority was the country's main public broadcasting service until 2017, when it was replaced by Kan (Hebrew for "here"), the Israeli Public Broadcasting Corporation. In Arabic, the IPBC is known by the name Makan (Arabic for "place"). Kan has inherited the two main public TV channels in Israel:

- Kan 11, previously Channel 1 – main TV channel
- Makan 33, previously Channel 33 – Arabic language TV channel

Kan also includes the following 8 public radio stations, taken from IBA:

- Kan Tarbut, previously Reshet Alef (Network A) – podcasts and talk programs related to culture
- Kan Bet, previously Reshet Bet (Network B) – news and current affairs
- Kan Gimel, previously Reshet Gimel (Network C) – Israeli music
- Radio Makan, previously Reshet Dalet (Network D) – Arabic language station
- Kan Reka, previously Reka, Reshet Klitat Aliyah (Aliyah integration network) – multilingual, mostly Russian language station
- Kan 88, previously 88FM – Alternative music
- Kan Kol Hamusica, previously Kol Hamusica ("The Sound of Music") – classical music, jazz
- Kan Moreshet, previously Reshet Moreshet – Jewish-related news and programming
- VoisFarsi – Persian language station, internet only, closed in 2020

In addition, the ministry of education owned the Israeli Educational Television, known as Hinuchit, the first Israeli television channel. It was created by the Rothschild fund to aid the ministry's work in teaching children from kindergarten to high school and to promote the television's use in Israel at a time the government considered the device a "cultural decadence". It is funded and operated by the ministry, and since the 1980s it has widened its orientation to adults as well as children. In August 2018, the Educational Television was shut down and replaced by Kan Educational.

=== Europe ===
In most countries in Europe, public broadcasters are funded through a mix of advertising and public finance, either through a license fee or directly from the government.

==== Austria ====
ORF (Österreichischer Rundfunk) is the public broadcaster in Austria. Despite the fact that private broadcasting companies were allowed in Austria in the late 1990s, ORF is still the key player in the field. It has three nationwide radio channels (Ö1, Ö3, FM4), nine regional ones (one for each Bundesland). Its TV portfolio includes two general interest channels (ORF 1 and ORF 2), one cultural-instructional channel (ORF III), one Eurovision-wide version of ORF 2 and a sports channel (ORF Sport +). ORF also takes part in the German-language satellite TV network 3sat.

==== Belgium ====
Belgium has three networks, one for each linguistic community:

- VRT, Dutch
- RTBF, French
- BRF, German

Originally named INR – Institut national belge de radiodiffusion – the state-owned broadcasting organization was established by law on 18 June 1930. Television broadcasting from Brussels began in 1953, with two hours of programming each day. In 1960 the INR was subsumed into RTB (French: Radio-Télévision Belge) and BRT (Dutch: Belgische Radio en Televisieomroep). On 1 October 1945, INR-NIR began to broadcast some programmes in German. In 1961 RTB-BRT began a German-language radio channel, broadcasting from Liège.

In 1977, following Belgian federalization and the establishment of separate language communities, the French-language section of RTB-BRT became RTBF (French: Radio-Télévision Belge de la Communauté française), German-language section became BRF (German: Belgischer Rundfunk) and Dutch-language stays BRT. BRT was renamed in 1991 to BRTN (Dutch: Belgische Radio- en Televisieomroep Nederlandstalige Uitzendingen) and again in 1998 to VRT (Dutch: Vlaamse Radio – en Televisieomroeporganisatie).

==== Bulgaria ====
There are two public media in Bulgaria – the Bulgarian National Television (BNT) and the Bulgarian National Radio (BNR). Bulgarian National Television was founded in 1959 and the Bulgarian National Radio was founded in 1935. BNT broadcasts 4 national programs (BNT 1, BNT 2, BNT 3, BNT 4 – broadcasts internationally). The BNR broadcasts 2 national programs (Horizont and Hristo Botev Program), 9 regional programs and Internet Radio Binar.

==== Croatia ====
Croatian Radiotelevision (Croatian: Hrvatska radiotelevizija, HRT) is a Croatian public broadcasting company. It operates several radio and television channels, over a domestic transmitter network as well as satellite. As of 2002, 70% of HRT's funding comes from broadcast user fees with each house in Croatia required to pay 79 HRK, kuna, per month for a single television (radio device, computer or smartphone), with the remainder being made up from advertising.

==== Czech Republic ====
Czech Television (Czech: Česká televize) and Czech Radio (Czech: Český rozhlas) are public broadcasters formed in 1992 to take over the Czech operations of the state-ran Czechoslovak Television and Czechoslovak Radio, respectively. Until the dissolution of Czechoslovakia in 1993, both broadcasters coexisted with their federal Czechoslovak counterparts, after which they also took over the channels previously occupied by the common federal broadcasting. Czech Television broadcasts from three studios in Prague, Brno, and Ostrava and operates several TV channels: ČT1, ČT2, ČT24, ČT Sport, ČT :D, and ČT art. Czech television is funded through a monthly fee of 135 CZK which every household that owns a TV or a radio has to pay. Since October 2011 advertising on Czech TV is restricted to ČT 2 and ČT sport.

Czech Radio broadcasts four nationwide stations Radiožurnál, Dvojka, Vltava, and Plus, several regional and topical digital stations. It also provides an international service Radio Prague International, which broadcasts abroad in six languages. Czech Radio is funded through a monthly fee of 45 CZK. Current general manager of Czech Television is Jan Souček, who was elected for a six-year term by the Czech Television Council (Czech: Rada České televize). Souček has courted controversy in his tenure given his attack on free media and his attacks on employees of Czech Television. Souček compared himself to Milada Horáková after strong criticism of his managerial skills from Czech Television Council. Souček later commented that it was silly from him. In an interview on 5. 9. 2023‌ Souček, as the incoming director general, stated: "I am constantly asking for money. A press conference of the Ministry of Culture has been announced for Tuesday, where the ministerial commission should reveal how it envisions the reform of financing public service media. According to my information, our call will be heard for the most part." During his tenure, Souček constantly asks for more money from the public fees, however it seems that he is not able to use money economically while blacking out financial documents to hide it from the public.

==== Denmark ====
DR is the national public service broadcaster. The organisation was founded in 1925, on principles similar to those of the BBC in the United Kingdom. DR runs six nationwide television channels and eight radio channels. Financing comes primarily from a yearly licence fee, that everyone who owns either a television set, a computer or other devices that can access the internet, has to pay. A part of collected fees is also used to finance the network of regional public service stations operating under the brand of TV 2. TV 2 itself, however, is a commercial government-owned television funded by subscriptions and advertising, with particular public service duties such as allowing regional stations to air their newscasts within specific timeslots of the main TV 2 channel.

==== Faroe Islands ====
Kringvarp Føroya is the organisation in Faroe Islands with public service obligations. Formed in 1957 as a radio broadcaster Útvarp Føroya. Merged with Sjónvarp Føroya TV station on 1 January 2007 to form Kringvarp Føroya. Funded by licence fees.

==== Estonia ====
Estonian Public Broadcasting (ERR) organises the public radio and television stations of Estonia. Eesti Televisioon (ETV), the public television station, made its first broadcast in 1955, and together with its sister channel ETV2 has about 20% audience share.

==== Finland ====
Yle – The Finnish Broadcasting Company, (pronounced /yle/) or Yleisradio (in Finnish) and Rundradion (in Swedish) is Finland's national public service media company. Founded in 1926, it is a public limited company majority owned by the Finnish state, employing around 2,800 people. Yle is funded by a special Yle tax. Yle has four television channels, three television channel slots, six nationwide radio channels and three radio services. Yle TV1 is the most viewed TV channel in Finland and Yle Radio Suomi the most popular radio channel. Yle was the first of the Nordic public broadcasters to implement the Eurovision's portability regulation on its online media service Yle Areena. Yle Areena is the most used streaming service in Finland, beating even Netflix that is the most popular streaming service everywhere else. Yle focuses highly on developing its digital services. In 2016 a Reuters Institute study of European public service companies show that Yle and BBC are the public service pioneers in digital development and performing the best while introducing innovative digital services in their news operations, developing mobile services and promoting the development of new digital approaches. Yle's Voitto robot based on machine learning is the first personal news assistant in the world to give recommendations directly on the lock screen in the Yle NewsWatch application.

==== France ====
In 1949 Radiodiffusion-Télévision Française (RTF – French television and radio broadcasting) was created to take over from the earlier Radiodiffusion française responsibility for the operation of the country's three public radio networks and the introduction of a public television service. RFO and a fourth radio network was added in 1954 and a second television channel in 1963.

RTF was transformed into the Office de radiodiffusion télévision française (ORTF), a more independent structure, in 1964. ORTF oversaw the introduction of a third television channel in 1972, two years before the dissolution of the structure in 1974. At that time a network of local and regional channels was created, nationally grouped under the France 3 channel, and between this date and 2000, each national channel had its own direction structure, while being in France Télévision group. In 1984, the European channel TV5Monde is created. The first channel (TF1) was sold to the private sector in 1987. (At the time, the channel with the largest audience was the other public channel Antenne 2).

In 1986 La Sept, another European channel, was created, before being eaten by the French/German public channel Arte in 1991, originally broadcast on cable and satellite. In 1992, the fall of the private channel La Cinq freed the frequencies that it had used, witch has been affected to Arte each day from 19.00 to 3. In 1994 a new public channel, La cinquième was created and used the remaining time on the same frequencies. La cinquième and ARTE subsequently shared the same channels with the exception of satellite, cable, and internet channels where both could be broadcast all day long. As 31 March 2005 broadcast permitted to give plain channel to La cinquième, Arte, France Ô, and France 4. Moreover, Gulli, a channel dedicated to kids, was partially owned by France Télévision between 2005 and 2014.

==== Germany ====
After World War II, when regional broadcasters had been merged into one national network by the Nazis to create a powerful means of propaganda, the Allies insisted on a de-centralised, independent structure for German public broadcasting and created regional public broadcasting agencies that, by and large, still exist today.

Map of ARD-members

- NDR (Lower Saxony, Hamburg, Schleswig-Holstein and Mecklenburg-Vorpommern), split from former NWDR
- RBB (Berlin and Brandenburg), merged from SFB and ORB
- SWR (Baden-Württemberg and Rhineland-Palatinate), merged from SDR and SWF
- MDR (Saxony, Saxony-Anhalt and Thuringia), established in 1991
- WDR (North Rhine-Westphalia), split from former NWDR
- BR (Bavaria)
- hr (Hesse)
- SR (Saarland)
- RB (Bremen)

In addition to these nine regional radio and TV broadcasters, which cooperate within ARD, a second national television service – actually called Second German Television (German: Zweites Deutsches Fernsehen, ZDF) – was later created in 1961 and a national radio service with two networks (Deutschlandradio) emerged from the remains of Cold War propaganda stations in 1994. All services are mainly financed through licence fees paid by every household and are governed by councils of representatives of the "societally relevant groups". Public TV and radio stations spend about 60% of the ≈10bn € spent altogether for broadcasting in Germany per year, making it the most well funded public broadcasting system in the world.

The Hans-Bredow-Institut, or Hans-Bredow-Institute for Media Research at the University of Hamburg (HBI) is an independent non-profit foundation with the mission on media research on public communication, particularly for radio and television broadcasting (including public service media providers) and other electronic media, in an interdisciplinary fashion. In Germany foreign public broadcasters also exist. These are AFN for US-military staff in Germany, BFBS for British military staff, Voice of Russia, RFE and Radio Liberty. Eventually, Arte is a French/German cultural TV channel operated jointly by France Télévisions, ZDF, and ARD. It is a binational channel broadcast in both countries.

==== Greece ====
ERT's logo

Hellenic Broadcasting Corporation (Greek: Ελληνική Ραδιοφωνία Τηλεόραση ή ERT) is the state-owned public broadcaster in Greece. It broadcasts five television channels: ERT1, ERT2, ERT3 (located in Thessaloniki city), ERT SPORTS HD are the terrestrial broadcast channels, as well as ERT WORLD, a satellite channel focused to the Greek diaspora. ERT is broadcasting also five national (ERA 1, ERA 2, ERA 3, Kosmos, ERA Sport), and 21 local radio stations (two of them located in Thessaloniki, the second major city of Greece). All national television and radio stations are broadcast through ERT digital multiplexes across the country and through satellite, via the two digital platforms (NOVA and Cosmote). ERT also operates a web-TV service with a live transmission of all the terrestrial and satellite channels as well as 4 independent OTT channels (ERT PLAY 1, 2, 3 and 4) that carries mostly sport events and older archived shows.

ERT operates 8 television studios in three buildings in Athens: five of them in the headquarters called "Radiomegaro" ("Ραδιομέγαρο" that means "radio palace") located in Agia Paraskevi area, two of them in Katehaki str. facility and one small one in the center of Athens near the Parliament, in the Mourouzi str. facility. In Thessaloniki, ERT operates two television studios in the L. Stratou avenue and another three studios in smaller cities (Heraclion, Patras and Corfu) that can be used only for television correspondences. ERT operates several radio studios in "Radiomegaro", in Thessaloniki (located at Aggelaki str., besides International Exhibition facility) and in 19 Greek cities, as well as a national news web site.

==== Iceland ====
Ríkisútvarpið (RÚV) ("The Icelandic National Broadcasting Service") is Iceland's national public-service broadcasting organisation. RÚV began radio broadcasting in 1930 and its first television transmissions were made in 1966. In both cases coverage quickly reached nearly every household in Iceland. RÚV is funded by a television licence fee collected from every income taxpayer, as well as advertising revenue. RÚV has been a full active member of the European Broadcasting Union since 1956. RÚV – which by the terms of its charter is obliged to "promote the Icelandic language, Icelandic history, and Iceland's cultural heritage" and "honour basic democratic rules, human rights, and the freedom of speech and opinion" – carries a substantial amount of arts, media, and current affairs programming, in addition to which it also supplies general entertainment in the form of feature films and such internationally popular television drama series as Lost and Desperate Housewives. RÚV's lineup also includes sports coverage, documentaries, domestically produced entertainment shows, and children's programming.

==== Ireland ====
In Ireland there are two state owned public service broadcasters, RTÉ and TG4. RTÉ was established in 1960 with the merger of Raidió Éireann (1926) and Teilifís Éireann (1960). TG4 was formed as a subsidiary of RTÉ in 1996 as Teilifís na Gaeilge (TnaG), it was renamed TG4 in 1999, and was made independent of RTÉ in 2007. Both Irish public service broadcasters receive part of the licence fee, with RTÉ taking the lion's share of the funding. Advertising makes up 50% of RTÉ's income and just 6% of TG4's income. 7% of the licence fee is provided to the Broadcasting Authority of Ireland since 2006. Up to 2006 the licence fee was given entirely to RTÉ. RTÉ offers a range of free to air services on television; RTÉ One, RTÉ2, RTÉjr, and RTÉ News Now. On radio; RTÉ Radio 1, RTÉ 2FM, RTÉ Lyric FM, and RTÉ Raidió na Gaeltachta, as well as a number of channels on DAB.

The Sound and Vision Fund is operated by the Broadcasting Authority of Ireland, this fund receives 7% of the licence fee. The fund is used to assist broadcasters to commission public service broadcast programming. It is open to all independent producers provided they the backing of a free-to-air or community broadcaster, such as Virgin Media, Today FM, BBC Northern Ireland, RTÉ, Channel 4, UTV, etc. Pay TV broadcaster Setanta Sports have also received funding for programming through the Fund provided they make that programming available on a free-to-view basis. TG4 is an independent Irish language public service broadcaster that is funded by government subsidy, part of the licence fee, and through advertising revenue. Virgin Media is the only independent broadcaster that has public service commitments.

==== Lithuania ====
Lithuanian National Radio and Television (LRT) is the national broadcaster of Lithuania. It was founded in 1926 as radio broadcaster, and opened a television broadcasting subdivision in 1957. LRT broadcasts three radio stations (LRT Radijas, LRT Klasika, and LRT Opus), and three TV channels (LRT televizija, LRT Plius, and LRT Lituanica).

==== Montenegro ====
RTCG (Radio Television of Montenegro) is the public broadcaster in Montenegro and maintains editorial independence from its government.

==== Netherlands ====
The Netherlands uses a rather unusual system of public broadcasting. Public-broadcasting associations are allocated money and time to broadcast their programmes on the publicly owned television and radio channels, collectively known under the NPO name. The time and money is allocated in proportion to their membership numbers. The system is intended to reflect the diversity of all the groups composing the nation and maintains editorial independence from the government.

==== Nordic countries ====
National public broadcasters in Nordic countries were modeled after the BBC and established a decade later: Radioordningen (now DR) in Denmark, Kringkastingselskapet (now NRK) in Norway, and Radiotjänst (now Sveriges Radio and Sveriges Television) in Sweden (all in 1925). In 1926 Yleisradio, (Swedish: Rundradion) now Yle was founded in Finland. Ríkisútvarpið (RÚV) is the official public broadcast service in Iceland. Four of the five are funded from television licence fees costing (in 2007) around €230 (US$300) per household per year. Since 2020, NRK has been funded directly through the national budget, replacing television licence fees.

==== Poland ====
Polskie Radio was seen to be the last remaining form of public broadcasting as Telewizja Polska (TVP) has been seen as state media during the PiS government by various press freedom organisations due its strong bias in favour of the ruling party, with Reporters Without Borders calling it a government mouthpiece. Polskie Radio operates four nationwide radio channels (which are also available via the broadcaster's website). There are also 17 public radio stations broadcasting in particular regions. Polish Radio (and TVP) are funded from several sources: state funding, advertising, obligatory tax on all TV and radio receivers, and money from authors/copyright associations. The public broadcaster offers a mix of commercial shows and programmes they are, by law, required to broadcast (i.e., non-commercial, niche programmes; programmes for children; programmes promoting different points of view and diversity; programmes for different religious and national groups; live coverage of the parliament's session on its dedicated channel: TVP Parlament; etc.). It has to be politically neutral, although in the past there have been cases of political pressure on TVP and Polskie Radio from the governing party. Recently, a new law has been passed by the ruling Law & Justice party, that in public perception allowed the party to take a much larger control over the media that has been possible before. The party states this law to be the first step to a complete public media overdo. Many worry no such improvements are actually coming and that these recent laws are only another step in taking control over the whole country by the Law & Justice party. There is an ongoing debate in Poland about the semi-commercial nature of TVP and PR. Many people fear that making them into totally non-commercial broadcasters would result in the licence fee payable by households being increased, and fewer people being interested in programmes they offer; others say that TVP in particular is too profit-driven and should concentrate on programming that benefits the society.

==== Serbia ====
Radio Television of Serbia (RTS) is the national public broadcaster in Serbia that does not have editorial independence from its government. It operates a total of five television channels (RTS1, RTS2, RTS Digital, RTS HD and RTS SAT) and five radio stations (Radio Belgrade 1, Radio Belgrade 2, Radio Belgrade 3, Radio Belgrade 202, and Stereorama). RTS is primarily funded through public television licence fees bundled with electricity bills paid monthly, as well as advertising.

==== Spain ====
In Spain, being a highly decentralized country, two public broadcasting systems coexist: a national state-owned broadcasting corporation, Radiotelevisión Española (RTVE), that does not have editorial independence from the state, and many autonomic broadcasting corporations, owned by their respective autonomous community, which only broadcast within its own territory and many of which do have editorial independence. Moreover, most autonomous communities have their own public broadcaster, almost all of these are members of FORTA, and they usually tend to reproduce the model set up by RTVE. In the Autonomous Communities that have their own official language besides (Castilian) Spanish, those channels may broadcast in that co-official language. For example, this occurs in Catalonia, where CCMA's Catalunya Ràdio stations and Televisió de Catalunya channels broadcast in Catalan. In the Valencian Community, CVMC has a radio station and a television channel, both branded as À Punt and broadcast mainly in Valencian. In the Basque Country, EITB's Eusko Irratia stations and Euskal Telebista (ETB) channels broadcast in either Basque or Spanish. In Galicia, CRTVG's Radio Galega stations and Televisión de Galicia (TVG) channels broadcast in Galician. All the autonomous community networks are funded by a mixture of public subsidies and private advertising.

==== Sweden ====
The logo of SVT

The logo of Sveriges Radio

Sweden has three public service broadcasters, namely Sveriges Television (SVT), Sveriges Utbildningsradio (UR), and Sveriges Radio (SR), having previously had government monopoly. SVT is the national public television broadcaster with 4 channels (SVT 1, SVT 2, SVT Barn, and SVT 24). The aim is to make programmes for everybody. For example, Sweden has the historic Sami minority and SVT make programmes in their language for them to watch. There are also a Finnish minority in Sweden, thus SVT show news in Finnish on SVT Uutiset. SR is the radio equivalent of SVT, with channels P1, P2, P3, P4, P5, and the Finnish channel SR Sisuradio.

==== Ukraine ====
The logo of Suspilne

Public Broadcasting Company of Ukraine (Suspilne) is the national public broadcaster in Ukraine. It operates two national TV channels: Pershyi and Suspilne Kultura, along with 24 regional channels. Suspilne broadcasts on 3 national and 1 international radio channels: Ukrainian Radio, Radio Promin, Radio Kultura and Radio Ukraine International. The regional branches have their broadcasting slots in the broadcast schedule of the Ukrainian Radio.

==== United Kingdom ====
The United Kingdom has a strong tradition of public service broadcasting. In addition to the BBC, established in 1922, there is also Channel 4, a publicly owned, commercially funded public service broadcaster, and S4C, a Welsh-language broadcaster in Wales. Furthermore, the two commercial broadcasters ITV and Channel 5 also have significant public service obligations imposed as part of their licence to broadcast. In the UK there are also small community broadcasters. There are now 228 stations with FM broadcast licences (licensed by Ofcom). Community radio stations typically cover a small geographical area with a coverage radius of up to 5 kilometres (3.1 mi) and run on a nonprofit basis. They can cater for whole communities or for different areas of interest – such as a particular ethnic group, age group or interest group. Community radio stations reflect a diverse mix of cultures and interests. There are stations catering to urban or experimental music, while others are aimed at younger people, religious communities or the armed forces and their families.

=== Oceania ===
==== Australia ====
In Australia, the Australian Broadcasting Corporation (ABC) is owned by the Australian Government and is 100% taxpayer funded. The multicultural Special Broadcasting Service (SBS), another public broadcaster, now accepts limited sponsorship and advertising. In addition, there is a large Australian community radio sector, funded in part by federal grants via the Community Broadcasting Foundation, but largely sustained via subscriptions, donations and business sponsorship. As of February 2020, there are 450+ fully licensed community radio stations and a number of community television stations (most operating as Channel 31 despite being unrelated across different states). They are organised similarly to PBS and NPR stations in the United States, and take on the role that public access television stations have in the US.

==== New Zealand ====
In New Zealand all broadcasters are given a small slice of public broadcasting responsibility, because of the state-funded agency NZ On Air. This is because of NZ On Air's requirement for public-service programmes across all channels and stations, instead of being put into one single network. The former public broadcaster BCNZ (formerly NZBC – New Zealand Broadcasting Corporation) was broken up into separate state-owned corporations, Television New Zealand (TVNZ) and Radio New Zealand (RNZ). While RNZ remains commercial-free, TVNZ is commercially funded through advertising. TVNZ continues to be a public broadcaster; however like CBC Television in Canada it is essentially a fully commercial network in continuous ratings battles with other stations, which continues to be a controversial issue within New Zealand. With the shutdown of TVNZ 7, the only fully non-commercial public-service network in New Zealand is Radio New Zealand. Aside from television, New Zealand has a rich public radio culture, Radio New Zealand being the main provider, with a varied network (Radio New Zealand National) and a classical musical network (Radio New Zealand Concert). RNZ also provides the Pacific with its Radio New Zealand International. Aside from RNZ almost all of New Zealand's 16 regions has an "access radio" network. All these networks are commercial-free. In late January 2020, the Labour-led coalition government announced that they were planning to merge TVNZ and Radio New Zealand to create a new public broadcasting service. In response, the opposition National Party announced that it would oppose any plans to merge RNZ and TVNZ.

== See also ==
- List of public broadcasters by country
- Community broadcasting
- Editorial independence
- Independent media
- International broadcasting
- Nonprofit journalism
- Press freedom
- Public service journalism

== General and cited references ==
- Banerjee, Indrajit; Seneviratne, Kalinga, eds. (2006). Public service broadcasting in the age of globalization. Asian Media Information and Communication Centre. ISBN 981-4136-01-8.
- Raboy, Marc (1995). Public broadcasting for the 21st century. Acamedia research monographs. Vol. 17. Indiana University Press. ISBN 1-86020-006-0.
- Linke, Benjamin (2016), Public Financing of Public Service Broadcasting and its Qualification as State Aid, Peter Lang, ISBN 978-3-631-66568-8
- Price, Monroe Edwin; Raboy, Marc (2003). Public service broadcasting in transition: a documentary reader (PDF). Kluwer Law International. ISBN 90-411-2212-5. Archived from the original (PDF) on 2012-01-17.
