= Public broadcasting in the United States =

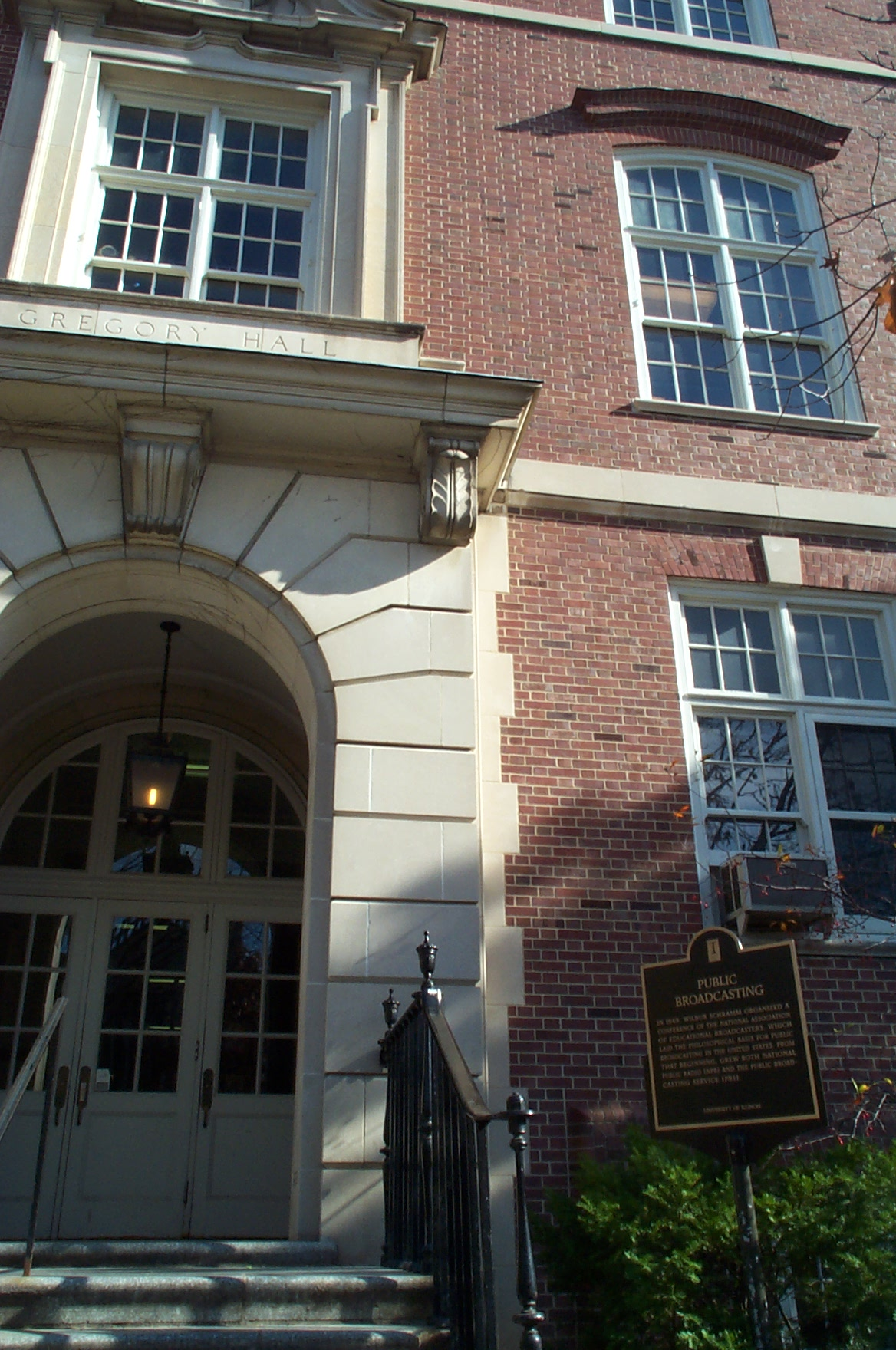
The Gregory Hall on the campus of University of Illinois at Urbana–Champaign hosted an important meeting of the National Association of Educational Broadcasters in the 1940s, that spawned both PBS and NPR.

In the United States, other than a few direct services, public broadcasting is almost entirely decentralized and is not operated by the government, but receives some government support. In July 2025, Congress approved a spending bill that terminated all federal funding for public broadcasting, including PBS and NPR.

== Background ==
The U.S. public broadcasting system differs from such systems in other countries, in that the principal public television and radio broadcasters – the Public Broadcasting Service (PBS) and National Public Radio (NPR), respectively – operate as separate entities. Some of the funding comes from community support to hundreds of public radio and public television stations, each of which is an individual entity licensed to one of several different non-profit organizations, municipal or state governments, or universities. Sources of funding also include on-air and online pledge drives and the sale of underwriting "spots" (typically running 15–30 seconds) to sponsors.

Individual stations and programs rely on highly varied proportions of funding. Program-by-program funding creates the potential for conflict-of-interest situations, which must be weighed program by program under standards such as the guidelines established by PBS. Donations are widely dispersed to stations and producers, giving the system a resilience and broad base of support but diffusing authority and impeding decisive change and priority-setting.

U.S. federal government support for public radio and television was filtered through the Corporation for Public Broadcasting (CPB), which operated as a separate organization. The CPB is shutting down following a new law of the U.S. government in July 2025 which halted all funding to the CPB.

Public radio and television stations often produce their own programs as well as purchase additional programming from national producers and program distributors such as NPR, PBS, American Public Television (APT), American Public Media (APM), and Public Radio Exchange (PRX).

Public television and radio in the U.S. has, from late 1960s onward, has dealt with severe criticism from some conservative politicians and think-tanks (such as The Heritage Foundation), which allege that its programming has a liberal bias. Mostly due to this belief, some conservatives (including Presidents Richard Nixon, Ronald Reagan, George W. Bush and Donald Trump, and former Speaker of the House Newt Gingrich) have made various efforts to privatize or cut funding the Corporation for Public Broadcasting through federal budget legislation. Support for continuing CPB funding by liberals, independents and some conservatives in Congress has led to many of these efforts failing at the federal level; although there have been successful attempts to reduce—though not eliminate—funding for public television stations by some state legislatures.

Arts advocates and media observers opposed to defunding the CPB argue that PBS provides educational and arts programming that have limited availability on American television, even as the advents of cable television and online streaming have led to the development of similar content, including to viewers in rural areas where educational funding is even lower than that of urbanized areas and do not have access to arts education. Previous estimates by the Corporation for Public Broadcasting have illustrated that removing federal funding to the CPB would severely hamstring rural PBS, NPR and independent public broadcasting stations, and may result in the gradual collapse of the public broadcasting system. Comprehensive studies by the Government Accountability Office and other organizations have concluded that private financing would not be universally available to public television and radio stations in less densely populated areas to sufficiently replace taxpayer funding that makes up 40% to 50% of the annual budgets of some stations, and ensure universal access to public broadcasting services.

== History ==
=== Early history ===
Early public stations were operated by state colleges and universities, and were often run as part of the schools' cooperative extension services. Stations in this era were internally funded, and did not rely on listener contributions to operate; some accepted advertising. Networks such as Iowa Public Radio, South Dakota Public Radio, and Wisconsin Public Radio began under this structure.

The Association of College and University Broadcasting Stations formed in 1925; in 1934, it was renamed the National Association of Educational Broadcasters. Over time, commercial broadcasting began to dominate the available frequency space.

The concept of a "non-commercial, educational" station per se did not show up in U.S. law until 1941, when the FM band was authorized to begin normal broadcasting (before 1941, it was experimental). The Federal Communications Commission (FCC), with lobbying from the NAEB, reserved the lower 5 frequencies of the band – between 42.1 and 42.9 MHz – for such stations; when the FM band moved in 1945 to 88-106 MHz (later expanded to 108 MHz), the frequencies from 88.1 to 91.9 MHz were set aside for non-commercial educational stations, though they are not limited to those frequencies (for example, WFIU in Bloomington, Indiana has its FM frequency at 103.7 MHz).

The W. K. Kellogg Foundation funded the formation of the "(NAEB) Tape Network" in 1951, and the Ford Foundation funded the National Educational Radio Network starting in 1961.

Houston's KUHT was the nation's first public television station, and signed on the air on May 25, 1953, from the campus of the University of Houston. This phenomenon continued in other large cities in the 1950s; in rural areas, it was not uncommon for colleges to operate commercial stations instead (e.g., the University of Missouri's KOMU, an NBC-affiliated television station in Columbia). The FCC had reserved almost 250 broadcast frequencies for use as educational television stations in 1953, though by 1960, only 44 stations allocated for educational use had begun operations.

The Ford Foundation funded the Educational Television and Radio Center in 1951, later renamed National Educational Television.

=== Public Broadcasting Act of 1967 ===
The passage of the Public Broadcasting Act of 1967 – which was signed by President Lyndon B. Johnson, and was modeled in part after a 1965 study on educational television by the Carnegie Corporation of New York – precipitated the development of the current public broadcasting system in the U.S. The legislation established the Corporation for Public Broadcasting (CPB), a private entity that is charged with facilitating programming diversity among public broadcasters, the development and expansion of non-commercial broadcasting, and providing funding to local stations to help them create programs; the CPB receives funding earmarked by the federal government as well as through public and private donations. While the intention of the act was to develop public television and radio, a revision of the bill had removed all mention of radio from the original text; Michigan Senator Robert Griffin suggested changing the name of what was to be called the Public Television Act, and last-minute changes were subsequently made to the bill (with references incorporating radio into the bill being re-added with Scotch Tape) before the law was passed by Congress and signed by Johnson.

=== Cancellation of funding by Donald Trump ===
As of July 17, 2025, Congress under the direction of president Donald Trump cancelled all federal funding for public broadcasting. Meanwhile, a national poll of likely voters released in July found 53% trusted public media in the United States, compared to 35% for the media in general.

On January 5, 2026, the Corporation for Public Broadcasting, which funded NPR and PBS, as well as many local TV and radio stations, announced that its board had voted to dissolve the organization after legislators removed $500 million worth of funding from the company.

== Radio ==
The first public radio network in the United States was founded in 1949 in Berkeley, California, as station KPFA, which became and remains the flagship station for a national network called Pacifica Radio. From the beginning, the network has refused corporate funding of any kind, and has relied mainly on listener support. KPFA gave away free FM radios to build a listener base and to encourage listeners to "subscribe" (support the station directly with donations). It is the world's oldest listener-supported radio network. Since the creation of the Corporation for Public Broadcasting, Pacifica has sometimes received CPB support. Pacifica runs other stations in Los Angeles, New York City, Washington, D.C. and Houston, as well as repeater stations and a large network of affiliates.

A public radio network, National Public Radio (NPR), was created in February 1970, as byproduct of the passage of the Public Broadcasting Act of 1967. This network – which replaced the Ford Foundation-backed National Educational Radio Network – is colloquially though inaccurately conflated with public radio as a whole, when in fact "public radio" includes many organizations. Some independent local public radio stations buy their programming from distributors such as NPR; Public Radio International (PRI); American Public Media (APM); Public Radio Exchange (PRX); and Pacifica Radio, most often distributed through the Public Radio Satellite System (PRSS). Around these distributed programs, stations fill in varying amounts of local and other programming. A number of public stations are completely independent of these programming services, producing all or most of their content themselves. Public radio stations in the United States tend to broadcast a mixture of news and talk programs along with music and arts/cultural programming. Some of the larger operations split off these formats into separate stations or networks. Music stations are probably best known for playing classical music, although other formats are offered, including the time-honored "eclectic" music format that is rather freeform in nature common among college radio stations. Jazz is another traditional, but declining, public radio programming staple. Cultural Native American and Mexican American music and programming are also featured regionally.

The U.S. government operates some limited direct broadcasting services, but all are either highly specialized (and, since the dawn of the millennium, automated) information services (WWV/WWVH time service, NOAA Weather Radio) or targeted at foreign audiences like Voice of America. From 1948 to 2013, foreign-targeted broadcasts, many of which were intended as propaganda, were barred from U.S. audiences because of the Smith–Mundt Act, a restriction that has since been lifted. While NOAA Weather Radio has individual terrestrial repeaters across the United States (albeit on a special band reserved for such broadcasts), WWV, VOA and others operate from single shortwave facilities; none of these services can be heard on the AM or FM bands most common on U.S. radio. In early 2016, KIOF-LP (97.9 FM) in Las Vegas, Nevada began airing VOA News hourly, and is the only known public radio station in the United States to broadcast the VOA news service since the Smith–Mundt Act restrictions were lifted.

Local stations derive some of the funding for their operations through regular pledge drives seeking individual and corporate donations, and corporate underwriting. Some stations also derive a portion of their funding from federal, state and local governments and government-funded colleges and universities, in addition to receiving free use of the public radio spectrum. The local stations then contract with program distributors and also provide some programming themselves. NPR produces its own programming (PBS, by contrast, does not create its own content, which is instead produced by select member stations and independent program distributors). NPR also receives some direct funding from private donors, foundations, and from the Corporation for Public Broadcasting.

== Television ==
In the United States, the Public Broadcasting Service (PBS) serves as the nation's main public television provider. When it launched in October 1970, PBS assumed many of the functions of its predecessor, National Educational Television (NET). NET was shut down by the Ford Foundation and the Corporation for Public Broadcasting after the network refused to stop airing documentaries on varying social issues that had received critical acclaim for their hard-hitting focus, but alienated many of the network's affiliates. NET's constant need for additional funding led the Ford Foundation to begin withdrawing its financial support of the network in 1966, shouldering much of the responsibility for providing revenue for NET onto its affiliated stations, prior to the foundation of the CPB, which intended to create its own public television service. PBS' incorporation coincided with the merger of NET's New York City station, Newark, New Jersey-licensed WNDT (which became WNET), into National Educational Television, the impetus of which was to continue receiving funding by Ford and the CPB. PBS also took over the rights to certain programs that originated on NET prior to its disestablishment (such as Mister Rogers' Neighborhood, Washington Week in Review and Sesame Street, the latter two of which continue to air on PBS to this day). PBS would later acquire Educational Television Stations, an organization founded by the National Association of Educational Broadcasters (NAEB), in 1973.

PBS and American Public Television (formerly Eastern Educational Television Network) distribute television programs to a nationwide system of independently owned and operated television stations (some having the term "PBS" in their branding) supported largely by state and federal governments as well as viewer support (including from pledge drives that many public television outlets carry for two- to three-week periods at least twice per year, at dates that vary depending on the station or regional network), with commercial underwriters donating to specific programs and receiving a short thanks for their contributions. Such underwriting may only issue declarative statements (including slogans) and may not include "calls to action" (i.e., the station cannot give out prices, comparative statements, or anything that would persuade the listener to patronize the sponsor). The majority of public television stations are owned by educational institutions and independent entities (including colleges and universities, municipal education boards, and nonprofit organizations); however, some statewide public television networks are operated as state government agencies, and some standalone public television stations serving an individual market are run by a municipal government or a related agency within it. Unlike National Public Radio, however, PBS largely does not produce any of the programs it broadcasts nor has an in-house news division; all PBS programs are produced by individual member stations and outside production firms for distribution to its member stations through the network feed.

With the exception of a few secondary or tertiary stations in certain major and mid-sized cities that rely entirely on syndicated content from American Public Television and other distributors, the vast majority of public television stations in the U.S. are member outlets of PBS. Of the 354 PBS members currently operating as of 2017 (which account for 97% of the 365 public television stations in the U.S.), roughly half belong to one of 40 state or regional networks, which carry programming fed by a parent station to a network of satellite transmitters throughout the entirety or a sub-region of an individual state; this model is also used by some public radio station groups (mainly those co-owned with a PBS member network). In a deviation from the affiliation model that began to emerge in commercial broadcast television in the late 1950s, in which a single station holds the exclusive local rights to a network's programming schedule, PBS maintains memberships with more than one non-commercial educational station in select markets (such as Los Angeles and Chicago, which both have three PBS member stations); in these conflict markets, PBS members which participate in the service's Program Differentiation Plan (PDP) are allocated a percentage of PBS-distributed programming for their weekly schedule – the highest total of which is usually allocated to the market's "primary" PBS station – often resulting certain programs airing on the PDP outlets on a delayed basis, unless the primary or an additional member station holds market exclusivity over a particular program.

As with commercial network affiliates, PBS member stations are given the latitude to schedule programs supplied by PBS for national broadcast in time slots of their choosing, particularly in the case of its prime time lineup, or preempt them outright. PBS stations typically broadcast children's programming supplied by the service and through independent distributors like American Public Television during the morning and afternoon hours, and on many though not all stations, on weekend mornings; most public independent stations also carry children's programming, though, they may not as broadly encompass those stations' daytime schedules as is common with PBS member outlets. Many member stations have also aired distance education and other instructional television programs for use in public and private schools and adult education courses (since the 2000s, many public television stations have relegated these programs to digital subchannels that the station may maintain or exclusively via the Internet). PBS also provides a base prime time programming schedule, featuring a mix of documentaries, arts and how-to programming, and scripted dramas. Acquired programming distributed directly to public television stations – such as imported series, documentaries and theatrically released feature films, political and current affairs shows, and home improvement, gardening and cooking programs – fill the remainder of the station's broadcast day. PBS and public independent stations also produce programs of local interest, including local newscasts and/or newsmagazines, public affairs shows, documentaries, and in some areas, gavel-to-gavel coverage of state legislative proceedings.

With the advent of digital television, additional public television networks – most of which have direct or indirect association with PBS – have also launched, to provide additional cultural, entertainment and instructional programming. PBS operates three such networks: PBS Kids, a network featuring children's programs aired on the main PBS feed's daytime schedule; PBS HD Channel, a dedicated feed consisting of high-definition content; and the PBS Satellite Service, a full-time alternate feed of programming selected from the main PBS service, which is also carried on some member stations as an overnight programming feed. Independent services include Create, an American Public Television-operated network featuring how-to, home and garden, cooking and travel programs; MHz Worldview, a network owned by MHz Networks, which carries international dramatic series (particularly crime drama), news programs and documentaries; and World Channel, a joint venture of American Public Television, WNET, the WGBH Educational Foundation and the National Educational Telecommunications Association that broadcasts science, nature, news, public affairs and documentary programs.

Most communities also have public-access television channels on local cable television systems, which are generally paid for by cable television franchise fees and sometimes supported in part through citizen donations.

== See also ==
- Current (newspaper)
- American Archive of Public Broadcasting
