= Carnegie Commission on Educational Television =

The Carnegie Commission on Educational Television was established in 1965 by the Carnegie Corporation of New York in the United States. This commission was created to research the role noncommercial educational television played on society in America. The 15 member commission attempted to carry out this goal by; distinguishing between commercial television, entertainment for large mass audiences: instructional television, in-class educational material, and public television. Public television was considered anything else that largely helped public affairs and was not supported by advertising.

== Early history ==
The commission first gained momentum at the First National Conference on Long-Range Financing of Educational Television Stations in December 1964. Although not created until 1965, the commission was first incepted at this conference.

== Public Television: A Program for Action ==
On January 26, 1967, the commission published its most famous and influential report on broadcast history, Public Television: A Program for Action. The reports main rhetoric was persuading America’s institutions (and proposing new institutions) to enhance educational television. Among the final recommendations in the report were; that a Corporation for Public Television be created to receive and disburse funds from the government and other sources, that it support at least two national and many local production agencies, that it seek ways to encourage interconnection of stations, and that sufficient funds, not subject to the annual appropriation process, be provided through a 2-5% tax on television receivers. The recommendations of the report were stated with 12 actions to be carried out by Congress and the Commission itself, although some of these actions were vague as to whom the primary target was.

=== Sections ===
The following actions were used by the Commission to persuade U.S. political institutions to enhance educational television, authorize the Corporation for Public Broadcasting and provide said organization with funds, and sponsor further research and studies to improve and advocate educational television. These actions also included steps that the proposed Corporation for Public Broadcasting should carry out to reach their goals.

1. “We recommend concerted efforts at the federal, state, and local levels to improve the facilities and to provide for the adequate support of the individual educational television stations and to increase their number.”
2. “We recommend that Congress act promptly to authorize and to establish a federally chartered, nonprofit, nongovernmental corporation, to be known as the "Corporation for Public Television." The Corporation should be empowered to receive and disburse governmental and private funds in order to extend and improve Public Television programming. The Commission considers the creation of the Corporation fundamental to its proposal and would be most reluctant to recommend the other parts of its plan unless the corporate entity is brought into being.”
3. “We recommend that the Corporation support at least two national production centers, and that it be free to contract with independent producers to prepare Public Television programs for educational television stations.”
4. “We recommend that the Corporation support, by appropriate grants and contracts, the production of Public Television programs by local stations for more-than-local use.”
5. “We recommend that the Corporation on appropriate occasions help support local programming by local stations.”
6. “We recommend that the Corporation provide the educational television system as expeditiously as possible with facilities for live interconnection by conventional means, and that it be enabled to benefit from advances in technology as domestic communications satellites are brought into being. The Commission further recommends that Congress act to permit the granting of preferential rates for educational television for the use of interconnection facilities, or to permit their free use, to the extent that this may not be possible under existing law.”
7. “We recommend that the Corporation encourage and support research and development leading to the improvement of programming and program production.”
8. “We recommend that the Corporation support technical experimentation designed to improve the present television technology.”
9. “We recommend that the Corporation undertake to provide means by which technical, artistic, and specialized personnel may be recruited and trained.”
10. “We recommend that Congress provide the federal funds required by the Corporation through a manufacturer's excise tax on television sets (beginning at 2 percent and rising to a ceiling of 5 percent). The revenues should be made available to the Corporation through a trust fund.”
11. “We recommend new legislation to enable the Department of Health, Education, and Welfare to provide adequate facilities for stations now in existence, to assist in increasing the number of stations to achieve nationwide coverage, to help support the basic operations of all stations, and to enlarge the support of instructional television programming.”
12. “We recommend that federal, state, local, and private educational agencies sponsor extensive and innovative studies intended to develop better insights into the use of television in formal and informal education."

=== Reception ===
Public Television: A Program for Action sold 50,000 copies in just a few days and received wide attention. The report also led to rapid and drastic actions. President Johnson mentioned public television in his 1967 State of the Union address, and shortly afterwards proposed legislation that was similar to the proposals in the report. In November 1967, the Public Broadcasting Act of 1967 became law and created the Corporation for Public Broadcasting (CPB).
