= Morris S. Novik =

American radio pioneer

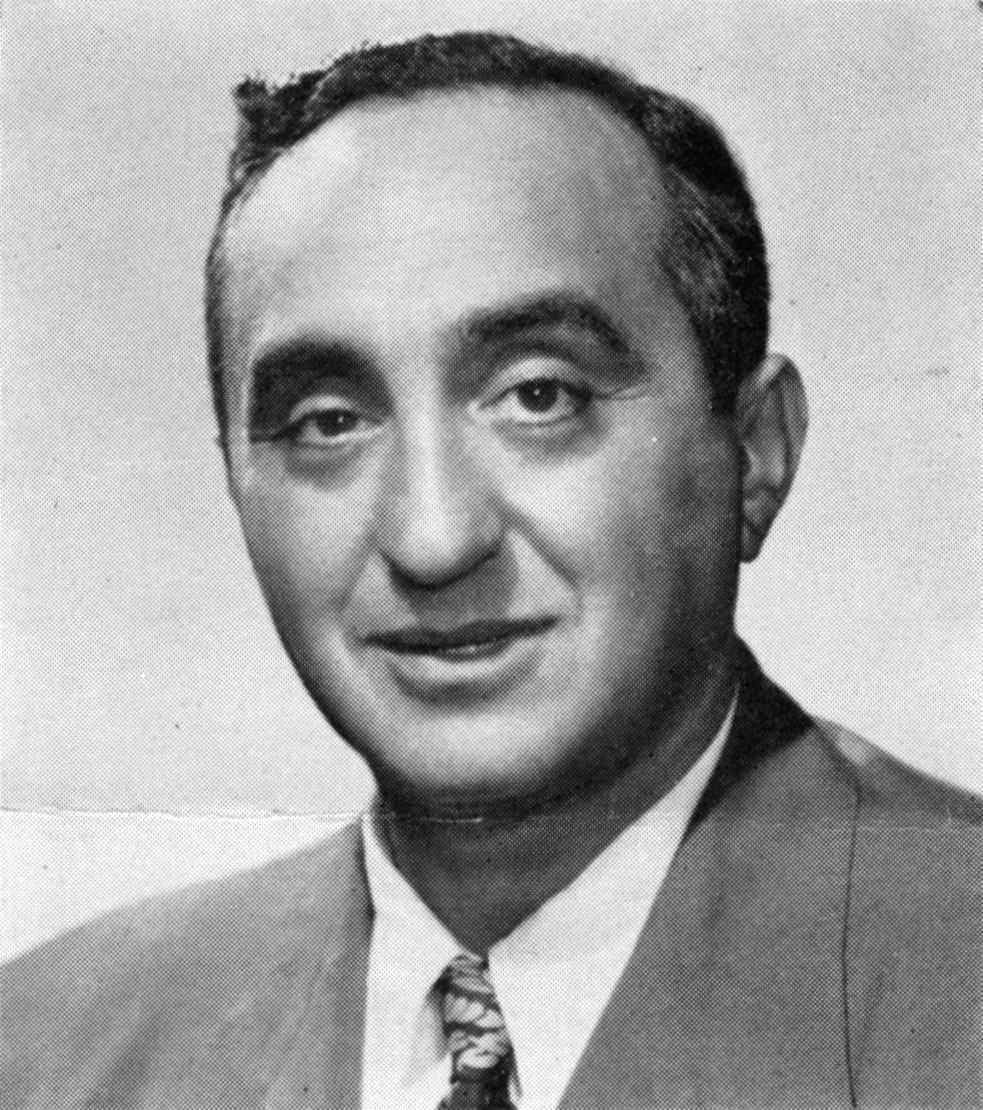
- Novik c. 1955

Director of the Municipal Broadcasting System
- In office February 9, 1938 – December 31, 1945
- Appointed by: Fiorello La Guardia

Personal details
- Born: Morris S. Novikov; November 15, 1903 Nevel, Vitebsk Governorate, Russian Empire
- Died: November 10, 1996 (aged 92) New York City, U.S.
- Party: Socialist (before 1936); American Labor (1936–1944); Liberal (after 1944); Democratic (after 1944)
- Other political affiliations: Social Democratic Federation (after 1936)
- Spouse: Manya Davidson (m. 1931; died 1993)
- Occupation: Activist, journalist, radio manager

Morris S. Novik (born Novikov; November 15, 1903 – November 10, 1996) was a Russian-born Jewish American early pioneer in radio who is credited with coining the phrase "public broadcasting". He was one of the first people to understand the potential that radio had for public service and education, especially with regard to the emerging labor movement throughout the U.S. in the early part of the 20th century.

== Biography ==
Morris S. Novikov was born to a Jewish family in Nevel, then a part of the Pale of Settlement in the Russian Empire, on November 15, 1903. They immigrated to New York City's Lower East Side in 1913, and, as a teenager, became active in socialist politics. In 1918, he worked for anti-war activist Scott Nearing, who was opposing the Republican Fiorello La Guardia for Congress. In a 1989 interview with The New Yorker, Novik said that this was when he first saw the future mayor, for whom he would work 20 years later as station manager of WNYC.

During the 1920s Novik chaired the local chapter of the Young People's Socialist League, ran unsuccessfully for New York State Assembly, and worked to bring socialist education to public schools. He also worked for The Daily Record, a labor oriented newspaper focused on the clothing industry. Still advocating for a socialist, labor oriented agenda, he joined the staff of the International Ladies' Garment Workers’ Union as the director of the Unity House, the union's summer resort that provided culture and education for its members. There, he created the Discussion Guild, arranging lectures and debates among some of the most notable thinkers of the day, including Clarence Darrow, Bertrand Russell, Will Durant, John Dewey and many others.

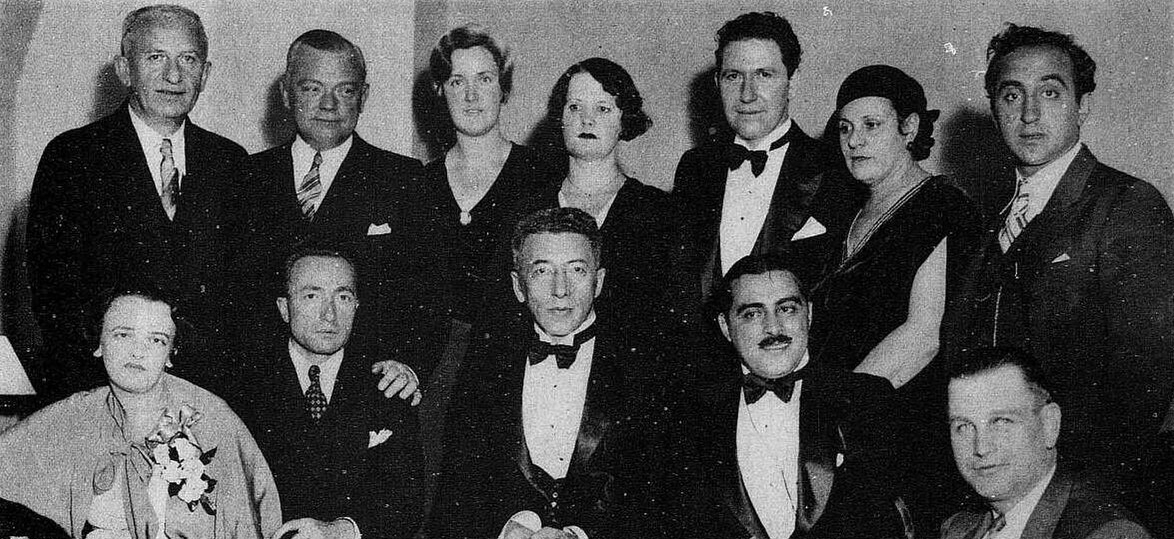
Novik (standing, far right) amongst the WEVD staff and Management Committee, 1932

Even though these events were often held in large venues such as Carnegie Hall, Novik understood that they were limited in their exposure, and that the new medium of radio could bring the latest thinking on the labor movement to households throughout the country. In 1932, Novik joined the staff of the relatively new radio station WEVD, named for the most notable socialist of the day, Eugene V. Debs, who had died five years earlier. As associate manager and program director, he founded the University of the Air, featuring broadcast lectures, discussions and debates focusing primarily on a socialist thinking and organized labor. Following the split of the Old Guard faction of the Socialist Party in 1936, Novik followed them into the Social Democratic Federation and later the American Labor Party.

In 1938 Mayor Fiorello La Guardia recruited Novik to head up WNYC, the municipal broadcasting station in New York City. There, he is said to have coined the term ‘public broadcasting.’ He not only continued using radio for public education and discussion, but was also responsible for broadcasting more live music than any other radio station in the country, including, among many other ground-breaking programs, The American Music Festival. During the war, Novik also assisted La Guardia in the creation of weekly underground broadcasts to the people in Italy. Novik served as director of WNYC until the end of La Guardia's final term, on December 31, 1945.

During the 1940s Novik helped found the National Association of Educational Broadcasters (NAEB), and served as its first executive secretary from 1941 to 1948. In the 1950s, he received the National Award and Citation of Merit from the NAEB.

In 1950 Novik bought WLIB, located in the center of Harlem in New York, and developed programming geared especially to the black population in the city. He kept the station until 1955, when he sold it to his brother, Harry Novik, who maintained that mission until 1971, when he sold the station, and it became the first Black-owned station in New York City.

After World War II, President Harry S. Truman appointed Novik to an advisory commission assisting European countries in their efforts to establish new communications media. In 1962, he was appointed by President John F. Kennedy to the U.S. Advisory Committee on Information, and was re-appointed later by President Lyndon B. Johnson. Novik also maintained his close ties to the Labor movement, serving as communications consultant to the American Federation of Labor and later to the AFL-CIO. He was also affiliated with the Liberal Party of New York.

In 1956 together with his wife, he survived the sinking of the Italian Liner Andrea Doria. One of the last passengers to leave the sinking ship, he assisted the crew in the evacuation efforts, and was later honored by the Italian government.

In the 1960s and for the rest of his career, Novik advocated for more public service broadcasting by radio stations. Testifying frequently before Congress, and in many speeches and articles, he urged lawmakers and the FCC to adhere to the standards set by the Communications Act of 1934, setting forth the public service function of radio, and lamented the brief coverage that most radio and TV stations were providing on the vital issues of the day.

Novik died in New York City on November 10, 1996.

== Sources ==
- Novik and LaGuardia, in Talk of the Town, The New Yorker, August 28, 1989, pp. 24–26.
- M.S. Novik: Radio’s Conscience by Richard J. Mayer. NAEB Journal, March–April 1966, pp 8–13
- Broadcasting:Vital for the Great Society, by Morris S. Novik, Speech before the 35th Institute for Education by Radio-Television, Columbus, Ohio, June 2–3, 1965.
