= Chalmers Marquis =

American public television and radio advocate (1926–2018)

Chalmers "Chuck" Marquis (November 12, 1926 - March 24, 2018) was an American public television and radio advocate. He was best known for his work in Washington D.C. where he was the Vice President of National Affairs at the National Association of Educational Broadcasters (NAEB), and later at PBS. He helped pass the Public Broadcasting Act of 1967 and lobbied for funding for Sesame Street. Hailed as "Public Television's voice on Capitol Hill," Chalmers was awarded the Ralph Lowell Award for his contributions to public broadcasting in 1992.

== Early life ==
Chalmers H. Marquis, Jr. was born in Bloomington, Illinois on November 12, 1926, to Chalmers H. Marquis, Sr. and Elsie Marquis. In 1932, after a fire destroyed the family bookstore in downtown Bloomington, the family moved to Chicago, Illinois. There, he graduated from Hyde Park High School. In high school, he was active in music, theatricals, and journalism. In 12th grade, Chalmers and several friends created a successful nightclub routine and were recruited by the William Morris Agency to go on a national tour.

He graduated from high school a semester early, in Jan. 1944, and spent a semester studying electronics at Illinois Institute of Technology, before enlisting in the U.S. Navy in summer 1944. Marquis served in the U.S. Navy through 1946 as an electrician's mate on LSM 484 in the Pacific. After his service, he earned degrees at the University of Chicago in 1948 and the University of Illinois Urbana-Champaign in 1950 in journalism and broadcasting.

Marquis married Carolyn Gavron in Chicago in 1951 and had two sons, Bruce and Brian.

== Career ==
In 1950, at age 23, Chalmers began working at Chicago's fledgling commercial TV stations, WGN and WBBM. Seeing television as a medium that could not just entertain but also educate, in 1955 he joined Chicago’s newly formed educational television station, WTTW. From 1955 to 1964, Chalmers rose from producer/director to director of programming. During his tenure, the station became the largest public broadcaster in the United States. During that time, he also taught courses in television at Chicago's Columbia College and organized Chicago Area School Television (CAST), which broadcast educational programs into school classrooms.

In 1965, Marquis moved to Washington, D.C. and worked for the National Association of Educational Broadcasters (NAEB), first as Director of the Educational Television Service (ETS) then as vice president of the NAEB. While there, he helped establish the Educational Television Stations Program Service (later the Public Television Library), which supplied programs to public television stations. He also pressed Congressional lawmakers to support legislation that eventually became the Public Broadcasting Act of 1967. Marquis later went to work at PBS, becoming the VP of national affairs in 1970. As public television’s chief Congressional liaison, he helped secure federal support for such landmark children’s programming as Sesame Street and 1-2-3 Contact.

When public TV leaders decided to create a separate organization to represent stations in Washington, Marquis moved on to the National Association of Public Television Stations. The policy organization was later renamed America's Association of Public Television, Inc., also known as APTS. He served as Congressional liaison for NAPTS and Children’s Television Workshop, where he was able to represent the emerging medium’s interests and expand educational television to school classrooms across the country.

== Later life ==
Marquis retired in 1991 and was honored with the Ralph Lowell Award for his contributions to public television. He remained active, lecturing at universities and working with the U.S. State Department to help Saudi Arabia establish an educational television network. His work in public broadcasting was commemorated in the book “Televisionaries,” and his papers now reside at the University of Maryland library

A long-time Washington D.C. area resident, Marquis lived on Lake Barcroft in Falls Church, Virginia for over 50 years, enjoying swimming and boating and volunteering for numerous organizations in the Washington area. Also a musician, Marquis played multiple instruments and marched in the Northern Virginia Firefighters Emerald Society Pipe Band for two decades before a stroke in 1994 ended his playing.
