= Current (newspaper) =

American trade journal that covers public broadcasting in the United States

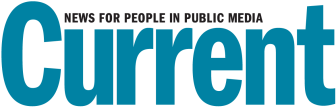
- Owner: American University School of Communication
- Founder: National Association of Educational Broadcasters
- Founded: 1980; 46 years ago
- Language: English
- City: Washington, D.C.
- Country: United States
- ISSN: 0739-991X
- Website: www.current.org

Current started as an American trade journal that covers public broadcasting in the United States. It was described by the Public Broadcasting Service (PBS) in 2003 as "The most widely read periodical in the field". It was formerly published by Current LLC and is currently published by the American University School of Communication, where it covers all nonprofit media. The newspaper, founded in 1980, was one of the last creations of the National Association of Educational Broadcasters, an association of noncommercial broadcasters dating back to 1925, whose members were leaders in founding PBS and National Public Radio. After the bankrupted NAEB closed in 1981, Current resumed publication in 1982 as an independent journalistic service of the public television station WNET. WNET.org sold Current to American University School of Communication in 2010. In 2014, Julia Drizin became the executive director.
