= Executive Order 14290 =

2025 executive order in the United States

- Ending Taxpayer Subsidization of Biased Media
- Front page of Executive Order 14290
- Type: Executive order
- Number: 14290
- President: Donald Trump
- Signed: May 1, 2025

Federal Register details
- Federal Register document number: 2025-08133
- Publication date: May 1, 2025
- Document citation: 90 FR 19415

Summary
- This executive order directs the Corporation of Public Broadcasting (CPB) to cease all funding for National Public Radio (NPR) and Public Broadcasting Service (PBS).

Executive Order 14290, titled "Ending Taxpayer Subsidization of Biased Media", is an executive order signed by U.S. president Donald Trump on May 1, 2025 to end federal funding for NPR (a radio network) and PBS (a television network) by the Corporation for Public Broadcasting (CPB) and by federal agencies, alleging biased news coverage in violation of the Public Broadcasting Act of 1967 (PBA) and that public funding for news programming was "not only outdated and unnecessary but corrosive to the appearance of journalistic independence" in the current U.S. media market.

CPB, PBS, and NPR executives issued press releases arguing that the executive order was unlawful under the PBA and that the organizations would explore how to continue providing programming while challenging the order. On May 27, NPR and three public radio stations sued the Trump administration for ending their federal funding under the executive order, citing it as a violation of the First Amendment. On May 30, PBS sued the Trump administration for ending their federal funding under the executive order.

Before the executive order was issued, the CPB filed a lawsuit against the Trump administration on April 28 after Trump attempted to fire three of the five members of the CPB's board of directors, while the CPB also filed a lawsuit against the Federal Emergency Management Agency (FEMA) in March 2025 for halting their funding under the Next Generation Warning System Grant Program within the Integrated Public Alert and Warning System.

FEMA released the funds on April 24. On June 8, District of Columbia U.S. District Court Judge Randolph Moss ruled against a preliminary injunction requested by the CPB in its lawsuit against the attempted director removals since the CPB changed its by-laws afterward under the District of Columbia Nonprofit Corporation Act to prevent any authority, including the President of the United States, from removing a director without a two-thirds vote of the other directors, which allowed for the directors to keep their positions. On July 15, the Trump administration filed a separate lawsuit to remove the same CPB directors.

On March 31, 2026, Judge Moss ruled for the plaintiffs, blocking the order on First Amendment grounds. In his ruling, Moss wrote, "It is difficult to conceive of clearer evidence that a government action is targeted at viewpoints that the president does not like and seeks to squelch."

== Legality ==
Although the CPB is required under the PBA to facilitate the development of public broadcasting in the United States with "strict adherence to objectivity and balance in all programs or series of programs of a controversial nature", the U.S. Court of Appeals for the District of Columbia Circuit held in 1975 that the "objectivity and balance" requirement under the law was an aspirational obligation rather than a legally enforceable standard, and the D.C. Circuit suggested that if it were a legally enforceable standard, it would be more restrictive than the fairness doctrine of the Federal Communications Commission (FCC) and raise "substantial constitutional questions" if it was analogously enforced. In 1978, the D.C. Circuit reiterated these concerns in a case that struck down an FCC regulation for noncommercial broadcasters, stating that an enforceable "objectivity and balance" standard "would raise serious constitutional questions, particularly in light of the Supreme Court's cautious approval of the more limited fairness doctrine in Red Lion Broadcasting Co. v. FCC." While the FCC fairness doctrine established a requirement for broadcasters to present programming that covered controversial issues of public importance with the opportunity for the presentation of contrasting viewpoints, the FCC gave broadcasters wide discretion to determine how to comply with the regulation.

Despite the Supreme Court's decision in Red Lion Broadcasting, the FCC repealed the doctrine in 1987 after studying the evolution of mass communications case law, the advancement of broadcast technology, and the doctrine's application in practice since its promulgation in 1949, and ultimately concluded in a 1985 report that the doctrine was chilling speech and probably violated the First Amendment under intermediate scrutiny. Referencing the D.C. Circuit Court decisions and the FCC's decision to repeal the fairness doctrine, a 1994 Yale Law & Policy Review (YLPR) article argued that if the fairness doctrine violated the First Amendment, then a legally enforceable "objectivity and balance" requirement under the PBA does as well a fortiori since they both impose content-based restrictions on speech that would not satisfy strict scrutiny due to overbreadth and vagueness, and that a legally enforceable "objectivity and balance" requirement for CPB funding would qualify as an "unconstitutional condition" under Rust v. Sullivan (1991) since it would infringe on the free speech rights of grant recipients outside of a government-funded program.

A 1994 Federal Communications Law Journal (FCLJ) article made similar arguments about the constitutionality of a legally enforceable "objectivity and balance" requirement. However, the Congressional Research Service (CRS) noted in a 2024 report that the Supreme Court stated in Rust v. Sullivan that even if government programs require speech to operate, the government may "selectively fund a program to encourage certain activities it believes to be in the public interest, without at the same time funding an alternative program" and held that the government can implement content-based restrictions within its own programs. At the same time, the CRS noted that the Supreme Court also held in Legal Services Corp. v. Velazquez (2001) and USAID v. AOSI I (2013) that the government is not permitted to create conditions for funding that leverage control of private speech outside of government-sponsored programs, and that the general principle of the unconstitutional conditions doctrine was established in Perry v. Sindermann (1972), where the Supreme Court stated that the government "may not deny a benefit to a person on a basis that infringes his constitutionally protected interests—especially, his interest in freedom of speech."

In reports issued in 2017 and 2025, the CRS noted that the CPB was congressionally incorporated as a private nonprofit corporation under the PBA, while PBS and NPR were privately incorporated as nonprofit corporations in turn by the CPB in 1969 and 1970 respectively. However, the CRS also noted in a separate 2017 report that the Supreme Court held in Lebron v. National Railroad Passenger Corp. (1995) and Department of Transportation v. Association of American Railroads (2015) that a declaration by Congress that a corporation is a governmental or private entity is not dispositive when determining that status in judicial review. Citing the CPB as a point of comparison, the Lebron decision also held that a corporation is a governmental entity if it was created by law to further governmental objectives and if the government retains the authority to appoint a majority of its board of directors. Referencing Lebron, a 2007 University of Pennsylvania Law Review (UPLR) article argued that despite the congressional declaration in the PBA that the CPB is a private corporation, federal courts could still hold that the CPB is a governmental entity since it was created under the PBA and the government appoints all of its directors.

Conversely, the YLPR article noted that the D.C. Circuit Court held in 1977 that the CPB is not a federal agency, that the Supreme Court denied a writ of certiorari in the case, and that the D.C. District Court held in 1979 that the CPB is not a state actor. However, the CRS noted that the Supreme Court did not use the "symbiotic relationship" test for state action established in Jackson v. Metropolitan Edison Co. (1974) in either the Lebron decision or the American Railroads decision. The CRS also noted that determining a corporation's status as a governmental or private entity was a threshold question before courts make determinations about congressional delegations of authority to such entities and Due Process Clause challenges to actions of the entity. The CRS suggested that whether an entity and its directors exercise sovereign authority may be a factor in determining whether an entity is governmental or private since the Supreme Court held in Buckley v. Valeo (1976) that officers of the United States under the Appointments Clause "exercis[e] significant authority pursuant to the laws of the United States."

Nonetheless, the CRS also noted that case law on whether a corporation is a governmental or private entity is undeveloped and fact-dependent, and that courts have generally examined entities in a holistic manner rather than on specific challenged actions of the entities. Although the Supreme Court articulated a five-part test in the American Railroads decision in determining that Amtrak was a governmental entity, the CRS noted that the Court did not articulate the relative importance of the factors considered in the case and provided little guidance on how the test may apply to corporations other than Amtrak. Additionally, the CRS noted in a subsequent report that what alone constitutes "significant authority" in Buckley v. Valeo was not clarified in Lucia v. Securities and Exchange Commission (2018). The YLPR and FCLJ articles argued that a 1992 amendment to the PBA converted the "objectivity and balance" aspirational obligation into a legally enforceable standard, and the CPB in turn into a regulator of public broadcasting programming—despite the amendment giving the CPB wide discretion of how to meet the statutory mandate and members of Congress stating explicitly in congressional debate that the amendment delegated no new regulatory authorities to the CPB.

Relatedly, the CRS noted that while the Supreme Court struck down a congressional delegation of regulatory authority to private entities in Carter v. Carter Coal Co. (1936), the Court upheld limited regulatory delegations in Currin v. Wallace (1939) and Sunshine Anthracite Coal Co. v. Adkins (1940) where the private entities did not impose or enforce binding legal requirements and primarily acted in an administrative or advisory role that was still subject to government oversight. Conversely, the CRS noted that the D.C. Circuit Court's decision on remand in American Railroads that the Due Process Clause is violated where a corporation is "a self-interested entity with regulatory authority over its competitors" was based on its conclusion that the Supreme Court's decision in Carter Coal owed to the delegation of coercive regulatory authority to a for-profit corporation. Also, referencing the Supreme Court's decision in United States v. Southwestern Cable Co. (1968), the CRS noted in separate reports that the FCC is the federal entity that is delegated regulatory oversight over broadcasting in the United States under the Communications Act of 1934.

While the YLPR article noted that the CPB is required to file annual reports to Congress and that its financial records are subject to auditing by the Government Accountability Office (GAO), it also noted that the PBA prohibits "any department, agency, officer, or employee of the United States to exercise any direction, supervision, or control... over the [CPB] or any of its grantees or contractors" and that the D.C. Circuit held in its 1975 decision that this prohibition extended to the FCC. In striking down Section 399 of the PBA that prohibited editorializing by noncommercial broadcasters, the Supreme Court concluded in FCC v. League of Women Voters (1984) that the CPB was organized under the PBA to minimize political interference with the entity such that it "would be as insulated from federal interference as… wholly private stations." With respect to First Amendment scrutiny, the Court stated in League of Women Voters that "although the Government's interest in ensuring balanced coverage of public issues is plainly both important and substantial, we have… made clear that broadcasters are engaged in a vital and independent form of communicative activity."

The Court previously had held in CBS, Inc. v. Democratic National Committee (1973) that commercial broadcasters were not required under the First Amendment, the Communications Act, or the FCC fairness doctrine to accept paid editorial advertisements. Likewise, in rejecting a First Amendment challenge by a third-party candidate to be included in an electoral debate on public television, the Supreme Court held in Arkansas Educational Television Commission v. Forbes (1998) that the debate was a nonpublic forum after noting how the AETC had been organized under a state law to also be insulated from political interference, and that while the debate was a form of programming, the structure of the organization holding the debate made it a nonpublic forum. Citing the League of Women Voters and Forbes decisions, the 2007 UPLR article argued that the Court effectively declined to consider public broadcasters to be governmental entities in the cases, and as such, that the CPB should not be considered a governmental entity for First Amendment purposes.

The CRS and the YLPR article also noted that the PBA prohibits the CPB from owning or operating stations, while PBS and NPR were incorporated as station-owned membership organizations, and PBS and NPR member stations are owned and operated by colleges and universities, public school districts, other private non-profit corporations, or state government agencies. Members of the CPB board of directors serve staggered six-year terms, may only serve up to two consecutively, and the PBA provides no specific guidance for director removals other than for absenteeism. While no more than five of the nine CPB director positions may be filled with persons affiliated with a single political party or be an employee of the United States, no other political test or qualification may be applied for director nominations or appointments. In 1975, Congress established the three-year funding authorization and two-year advance appropriation for the CPB by statute, and the U.S. Treasury Department created a trust for the CPB during the Carter administration to allow funds to flow directly to the CPB.

After administrative costs and system support programs, the entire federal appropriation to the CPB is used to provide grants to qualifying public broadcasting stations and program producers. Conversely, PBS and NPR receive only a small fraction of their total revenue from the CPB directly, with 16% and 1% respectively of their total revenue coming directly from all federal sources in total and the majority coming from member stations, distribution revenue and services, corporate underwriting and institutional support, and individual contributions. A 2011 FCC report noted that less than one-fourth of funds disbursed through grants by the CPB to public broadcasters were used for programming while the overwhelming majority was used for support of station infrastructure. The YLPR and FCLJ articles noted that the PBA prohibits the CPB from producing, scheduling, or distributing programming. Along with a 2007 GAO report about public television specifically, the CRS noted that while NPR is authorized to produce programming for its member stations, programming included in the PBS National Programming Service (NPS) is not produced by PBS itself but by its member stations, external production companies, and independent producers, and PBS and NPR member stations retain ultimate editorial control over which programming from the NPS and NPR they wish to broadcast.

== See also ==
- List of executive orders in the second presidency of Donald Trump
- Rescissions Act of 2025
