= National Educational Radio Network =

Philanthropy-funded audio program distributor in the US, forerunner to NPR

The National Educational Radio Network (NERN) was a means of distributing radio programs in the United States between 1961 and 1970. With funding from the Ford Foundation (who also funded the National Educational Television and Radio Center (who later spun off its radio assets)), the network began broadcasting on six radio stations on April 3, 1961.

A forerunner was formed in 1925 as the Association of College and University Broadcasting Stations, then renamed the National Association of Educational Broadcasters in 1934. In 1951 a grant from the W. K. Kellogg Foundation enabled the network to become the "(NAEB) Tape Network", based at the University of Illinois.

NAEB Tape Network became part of the National Educational Radio Network in 1963. As a result of the Public Broadcasting Act of 1967 NERN became part of National Public Radio in 1970.

Prior to the passage of the Public Broadcasting Act of 1967, the NERN had commissioned a study by Herman W. Land to assess the history of and future possibilities for educational radio. The publication and circulation of this study helped to jumpstart lobbying to include radio in the act, which was ultimately successful.
