= Educational Television Stations =

Educational Television Stations was a division of the National Association of Educational Broadcasters (NAEB), created at the association's 1963 convention in the United States. The new division had the following responsibilities:

- Activation and development of new educational television stations.
- Representation of stations before government and private agencies.
- Compilation of data regarding fund-raising activities.
- Facilitating personnel training and placement programs.
- Holding regional and national conferences
- Establishment of an educational television (ETV) program library service – formed the Educational Television Stations Program Service in 1965

Educational Television Stations merged with the newly reorganized Public Broadcasting Service (PBS) in 1973.

== See also ==
- America's Public Television Stations: A similar group founded in 1979
