= Corporation for Public Broadcasting =

American non-profit corporation (1967–2026)

- Final logo used from 2000 to 2026
- Type: Private, non-profit
- Industry: Television; Radio; Film
- Founded: November 7, 1967; 58 years ago
- Founder: Lyndon B. Johnson
- Defunct: January 5, 2026; 9 months ago
- Fate: Dissolved
- Headquarters: Washington, D.C., U.S.
- Area served: United States
- Key people: Patricia Harrison (president & CEO)
- Revenue: 582,013,746 United States dollar (2023)
- Total assets: 330,483,332 United States dollar (2023)
- Website: cpb.org at the Wayback Machine (archived November 27, 2001)

The Corporation for Public Broadcasting (CPB; stylized in all lowercase as cpb) was an American non-profit corporation created under the Public Broadcasting Act of 1967 to promote and help support public broadcasting in the United States. The corporation's mission was to ensure universal access to non-commercial, high-quality educational, cultural, and other content and telecommunications services.

The CPB received annual funding from Congress from 1967 to 2025. By law, more than 70 percent of its annual funding was directly allocated to locally owned public radio and television stations (more than 1,500 as of 2025), including PBS and NPR stations. In particular, CPB funding was a key part of small and rural public media station budgets.

Following the Trump administration's elimination and reallocation of federal funding for the organization, the CPB announced on August 1, 2025, that it would cease operations sometime in January 2026. Most of its staff departed following the end of the fiscal year on September 30, 2025; a small team remained until January to "focus on compliance, fiscal distributions, and resolution of long-term financial obligations." On January 5, 2026, the CPB board of directors voted to dissolve the corporation entirely.

== Funding and operations ==
The CPB's annual budget was composed almost entirely of an annual appropriation from Congress plus interest on those funds. Under the establishing law, no more than 5% of the appropriation would be used for administrative expenses. CPB allocated the funds to content development, community services, and other local station and system needs.

For fiscal year 2025, its operating budget included US$535 million of federal appropriation and $10 million in interest revenue. Its budgeted expenses were as follows:

- $267.83 million for direct grants to local public television stations;
- $96.78 million for television programming grants;
- $83.33 million for direct grants to local public radio stations;
- $28.63 million for the Radio National Program Production and Acquisition
- $9.58 million for the Radio Program Fund
- $32.10 million for system support
- $26.75 million for administration

Public broadcasting stations from the CPB were funded by a combination of private donations from listeners and viewers, foundations and corporations, as well as government sources from 1967 to 2025. Funding for public television in 2013 came in roughly equal parts from government (at all levels) and the private sector.

Stations that received CPB funds were required to meet certain standards, including open meetings, open financial records, a community advisory board, equal employment opportunity, and public lists of donors and political activities.

A 2007 Government Accountability Office (GAO) report and 2025 Congressional Research Service (CRS) report both found that public broadcasting stations in smaller and rural media markets had a greater dependence on federal funding. In 2023, rural stations received 45% of the CPB appropriation, while CPB grants accounted for at least 25% of station revenue for at least half of rural stations and more than 50% of revenue for some stations. A 2011 FCC report noted that less than one-fourth of funds disbursed through grants by the CPB to public broadcasters were used for programming while the overwhelming majority was used for support of station infrastructure.

After administrative costs and system support programs, the 2025 CRS report noted that the entire federal appropriation to the CPB was used to provide grants to qualifying public broadcasting stations and program producers. The Public Broadcasting Act prohibits the CPB from owning or operating stations, and from producing, scheduling, or distributing programming. As PBS and NPR were incorporated as station-owned membership organizations, PBS and NPR received only a small fraction of their total revenue from the CPB directly, with 16% and 1% respectively of their total revenue coming directly from all federal sources in total and the majority coming from member stations, distribution revenue and services, corporate underwriting and institutional support, and individual contributions. PBS and NPR member stations are owned and operated by colleges and universities, public school districts, other private non-profit corporations, or state government agencies. Along with the 2007 GAO report about public television specifically, the 2025 CRS report noted that while NPR was authorized to produce programming for its member stations, programming included in the PBS National Programming Service (NPS) was not produced by PBS itself but by its member stations, external production companies, and independent producers, and PBS and NPR member stations retain ultimate editorial control over which programming from the NPS and NPR they wish to broadcast.

Public television stations participate in the Emergency Alert System (which includes Amber alerts) and the pilot program for the Digital Emergency Alert System. The CPB was the sole eligible recipient of funding through the Next Generation Warning System Grant Program within the Integrated Public Alert and Warning System.

During the second Trump administration, federal funding for the CPB was eliminated with the passage of the Rescissions Act of 2025, and the corporation shut down operations by January 2026.

== History ==
=== Establishment ===
The Corporation for Public Broadcasting was created on November 7, 1967, when President Lyndon B. Johnson signed the Public Broadcasting Act of 1967 (PBA). The new organization initially collaborated with the National Educational Television network (NET), which would later be replaced by the Public Broadcasting Service (PBS). Ward Chamberlin Jr. was the first operating officer. On March 27, 1968, it was registered as a nonprofit corporation in the District of Columbia. In 1969, the CPB talked to private groups to start PBS, an entity intended by the CPB to circumvent controversies engendered by certain NET public affairs programs that aired in the late 1960s and which faced criticism from politically conservative public figures, potentially threatening the future viability of PBS, CPB and their collaboration. President Nixon was well known for his dislike of PBS and CPB, and wanted to kill congressional funding for them.

On February 26, 1970, the CPB formed National Public Radio (NPR), a network of public-radio stations that began operating the following year. Unlike PBS, NPR produces and distributes programming. In 1971, CPB and Ford Foundation formed a news-organizing production company, National Public Affairs Center for Television (NPACT) (originally National Public Affairs Broadcast Center), which supplies news programming for national distribution, with studios and productions based out of WETA-TV in Washington DC. In 1972, NPACT was merged into the DC station WETA-TV.

Launch Logo (1967)

First Logo (1967)
combination of C, P, and B

6th, 7th and 8th logo
used from 1983 to 2001.

Bolded version of the final logo,
used from 2001 to 2026.

Gray-blue version of the Bolded version of the final logo, used from 2001 to 2026.

=== History 1974–2002 ===
In 1974, another collaboration between public television stations, the Corporation for Public Broadcasting and the Ford Foundation began supplying the National Station Program Cooperative used to fund television programming for PBS. After two years, governance arrangements changed again, with public television stations taking most control and CPB and Ford holding reduced stakes and cash (called unrestricted general program grants).

In 1977, public television stations took full control of the Station Program Cooperative, allowing it to fund programs fully. This left CPB used to fund programs for PBS, for smaller amounts. In 1979, the Corporation for Public Broadcasting decided to restructure itself, forming two units, the Management Services Division, and The Program Fund, used to fund programs for PBS.

In 1990, it was restructured, allowing CPB to handle funding for most of their program supply to PBS in a major capacity again, for the 1991-1992 television season.

In 2002, the No Child Left Behind Act changed the focus of the Ready to Learn grants which formed one part of CPB funding, requiring grant recipients to emphasize early education and literacy. This indirectly caused the popular children's program Reading Rainbow to cease production, since it focused on specific books rather than teaching phonics skills.

=== Public interest programming ===
Under the Public Broadcasting Act, the congressional declaration of policy stated that it was in the public interest for the CPB to facilitate the development of educational, cultural, and other programming not provided by commercial broadcasters, as well as programming for audiences that were unserved or underserved by commercial broadcasters. The House and Senate reports that accompanied the PBA as a bill suggested that such programming was not provided by commercial broadcasters due to market failure, and that by providing seed funding through federal grants administered by the CPB, public broadcasters would contribute to a better-informed citizenry through high-quality national and local programming.

Under the Radio Act of 1927 and the Communications Act of 1934, Congress had established that broadcast licensees did not own the radio frequency assigned to them, and that the radio spectrum as a whole belonged to the public; and, as such, broadcasters could be and were required to serve the public interest in order to receive a license. In 1929, the Federal Radio Commission issued a regulatory ruling that held that broadcasters were expected to provide a balanced program schedule, which schedule would include programming for "education and instruction, important public events, discussions of public questions … and news".

In 1939, the Federal Communications Commission (FCC) required all radio stations to locate their main offices and studios in the community they were licensed to serve. In 1946, the FCC issued its Public Service Responsibility of Broadcast Licensees report that recommended that stations produce programming of local interest and to determine such programming through a community ascertainment process.

In 1949, the FCC promulgated the fairness doctrine which required broadcasters to present programming that covered controversial issues of public importance with the opportunity for contrasting viewpoints to be aired. In 1960, the FCC issued a policy statement that listed 14 categories of programming considered necessary for a station to be operating in the public interest, including: educational programs; public affairs programs; and news programs. However, out of more than 100,000 broadcast license renewal applications from 1934 through 2011, the FCC only rejected four renewal applications in total for failure to meet the public interest programming obligations — it last did so in 1980, and had done so only once before the PBA was passed. Also, a 1979 General Accounting Office (GAO) report estimated that even though the FCC only took preliminary action on 2 to 3 percent of the approximately 5,000 fairness doctrine complaints it received annually (with a total of only 15 to 20 complaints per year resulting in any adverse findings for licensees), many broadcasters would avoid presenting controversial public issues altogether in order to avoid sanctions or risk losing their licenses.

In 2011, the FCC issued a report that concluded that growth in the number of media outlets in the United States from satellite radio and television, cable television, and the internet, had not offset reductions in local news reporting with public interest, civics, or investigative journalism coverage caused by the decline of newspapers and local news in radio broadcasting. While local television stations were broadcasting a greater total number of news hours and had become some of the largest providers of local news online, most coverage was of crime and courthouses, accidents and disasters, and human interest topics — while at the same time the depth and quantity of public interest, civics, and investigative journalism coverage declined, and broadcast and internet news media remained heavily reliant on reporting about the latter topics from the declining number of newspapers through fair use exemptions in copyright law. However, even though total advertising spending in the United States had substantially shifted to television and cable from newspapers by the 1990s, the 2011 FCC report noted that local television stations were also seeing declining newsroom staffing alongside newspapers, with some stations outsourcing, reducing, or ending their local news programming. This was seen even more frequently in smaller media markets.

Also, the total number of local cable news channels nationally was not growing (and possibly declining in some regions) since most channels were only attempting to break-even rather than be profitable (and thus, by reducing net profit margins, they caused something of a drag on the balance sheets of their owner corporations). Most cable operators did not invest in local cable news channels and had no plans to do so.

Conversely, the 2011 FCC report noted that two-fifths of public radio listening hours was for news, 185 NPR member stations used an all-news format (with another 480 featuring news as part of mixed programming format), and the number of NPR member stations featuring local news had increased to 681 in 2009. One-third of all NPR programming was locally produced while less than 15% of the news and public affairs programming on commercial news/talk radio was local programming. A 2017 Congressional Research Service (CRS) report noted that 90 percent of public radio stations provided local newscasts and about half carried local news on weekends. While the 2011 FCC report noted that the news and public affairs programming of public television was mostly national programming, PBS programming was noted to provide greater in-depth coverage and journalistic documentaries than commercial television.

The 2011 FCC report also noted that NPR had 17 international bureaus and a greater number of foreign correspondents than NBC, CBS, Fox News, or MSNBC. As well, children's programming on cable television was dominated by entertainment programming while educational programming for children remained chiefly provided by public television. When surveyed by the GAO in reports released in 2004 and 2007, majorities of public television licensees expressed the view that they did not at the time produce enough local programming to serve the needs of their communities due to a lack of funds — and, consequently, that cutting the CPB appropriation would lead to a reduction in local programming.

In light of various changes in consumer preferences and market dynamics in the news industry, a 2023 GAO report suggested along with the 2011 FCC report that local public interest journalism was at risk of market failure due to having the non-excludable and non-rivalrous features of a public good that generates positive externalities and is vulnerable to free riding. Along with other policy proposals, the 2023 GAO report suggested increasing the federal CPB appropriation to address the market failure.

=== Digital broadcasting initiative ===
On May 31, 2002, the CPB, through special appropriation funding, helped public television stations making the transition to digital broadcasting; this was complete by 2009.

=== Objectivity and balance concerns in the 2000s ===
The Public Broadcasting Act of 1967 required the CPB to operate with a "strict adherence to objectivity and balance in all programs or series of programs of a controversial nature". It also required it to regularly review national programming for objectivity and balance, and to report on "its efforts to address concerns about objectivity and balance". In 2004 and 2005, people from PBS and NPR complained that the CPB was starting to push a conservative agenda. Board members replied that they were merely seeking balance.

In 2005, Kenneth Tomlinson, then chair of the CPB board, and himself a Republican, unilaterally commissioned a conservative consultant, hired without the knowledge of the CPB board, to conduct a study of alleged bias in NPR and PBS shows including The Tavis Smiley Show and The Diane Rehm Show, NOW with Bill Moyers, and Tucker Carlson: Unfiltered. CBP declined to release the report, but according to documents obtained by PBS, the consultant graded the shows and their various guests both on their political ideology and "whether they explicitly supported policies of the Bush White House." On November 3, 2005, Tomlinson resigned from the board, prompted by a report of his tenure by the CPB Inspector General, Kenneth Konz, requested by Democrats in the U.S. House of Representatives. The report stated:

We found evidence that the Corporation for Public Broadcasting (CPB) former Chairman violated statutory provisions and the Director's Code of Ethics by dealing directly with one of the creators of a new public affairs program during negotiations with the Public Broadcasting Service (PBS) and the CPB over creating the show. Our review also found evidence that suggests "political tests" were a major criteria [sic] used by the former Chairman in recruiting a President/Chief Executive Officer (CEO) for CPB, which violated statutory prohibitions against such practices.

=== Attempts to eliminate from 2011 to 2023 ===
In 2011, Paul Ryan's The Path to Prosperity budget passed in the House of Representatives, which would have eliminated the CPB. After Senate reconciliation, CPB funding was restored, although a 49-year-old grant program for public television, the Public Telecommunications Facilities Program, was eliminated, and a one-time recession payment to CPB was not renewed.

In 2017, the first Trump administration again attempted to eliminate the CPB. In 2019 and again in 2020, Trump attempted to cut CPB funding by more than 90%. Neither of these threats survived Congressional review.

In July 2023, the appropriations bill for FY 2024 included no money for CPB when it passed out of the US House Appropriations Subcommittee on Labor, Health and Human Services, Education, and Related Agencies. However, the corresponding bill considered by the Senate Appropriations Committee planned to continue funding for the CPB, though at 7 percent less than what President Biden requested.

=== Second Trump administration ===
==== Executive Order 14290 ====
Executive Order 14290, titled "Ending Taxpayer Subsidization of Biased Media", is an executive order signed by U.S. president Donald Trump on May 1, 2025 to end federal funding for NPR (a radio network) and PBS (a television network) by the Corporation for Public Broadcasting (CPB) and by federal agencies, alleging biased news coverage in violation of the Public Broadcasting Act of 1967 (PBA) and that public funding for news programming was "not only outdated and unnecessary but corrosive to the appearance of journalistic independence" in the current U.S. media market.

CPB, PBS, and NPR executives issued press releases arguing that the executive order was unlawful under the PBA and that the organizations would explore how to continue providing programming while challenging the order. On May 27, NPR and three public radio stations sued the Trump administration for ending their federal funding under the executive order, citing it as a violation of the First Amendment. On May 30, PBS sued the Trump administration for ending their federal funding under the executive order.

Before the executive order was issued, the CPB filed a lawsuit against the Trump administration on April 28 after Trump attempted to fire three of the five members of the CPB's board of directors, while the CPB also filed a lawsuit against the Federal Emergency Management Agency (FEMA) in March 2025 for halting their funding under the Next Generation Warning System Grant Program within the Integrated Public Alert and Warning System.

FEMA released the funds on April 24. On June 8, District of Columbia U.S. District Court Judge Randolph Moss ruled against a preliminary injunction requested by the CPB in its lawsuit against the attempted director removals since the CPB changed its by-laws afterward under the District of Columbia Nonprofit Corporation Act to prevent any authority, including the President of the United States, from removing a director without a two-thirds vote of the other directors, which allowed for the directors to keep their positions. On July 15, the Trump administration filed a separate lawsuit to remove the same CPB directors.

On March 31, 2026, Judge Moss ruled for the plaintiffs, blocking the order on First Amendment grounds. In his ruling, Moss wrote, "It is difficult to conceive of clearer evidence that a government action is targeted at viewpoints that the president does not like and seeks to squelch."

==== Rescissions Act of 2025 and subsequent disestablishment ====
On June 3, President Trump filed a request for a rescission bill that included the congressional appropriation for the CPB. The next day, Office of Management and Budget Director Russell Vought testified before the House Appropriations Subcommittee on Financial Services and General Government on the rescission request and the administration's 2026 fiscal year budget request. Before the rescission request, on March 26, PBS CEO Paula Kerger, NPR CEO Katherine Maher, and Alaska Public Media CEO Ed Ulman testified before the House Oversight Subcommittee on Delivering on Government Efficiency about CPB funding, the journalistic standards and alleged bias of the organizations, and public broadcasting's educational programming and participation in emergency alert systems in rural areas. On June 6, House Majority Leader Steve Scalise introduced a rescission bill in the House of Representatives, which included the appropriations for CPB.

The House passed the bill on June 12 along party lines by a vote of 214 to 212. On June 25, Vought testified before the Senate Appropriations Committee on the rescission bill. The Senate received the House bill on July 10 and it was referred to the Appropriations and Budget Committees. On July 15, the Senate passed motions to discharge the House bill from the Appropriations and Budget Committees and to proceed to debate with Vice President JD Vance casting tie-breaking votes on each motion. In the morning of July 17, the Senate passed the bill by a vote of 51 to 48 and with an amendment, requiring the bill to be transmitted back to the House for a second vote. The House approved the amended bill after midnight on July 18 by a vote of 216 to 213. President Trump signed the bill into law on July 24.

Critics of the rescission bill, such as Nevada U.S. Representative Mark Amodei and New York U.S. Representative Dan Goldman, noted that the CPB appropriation amounted to less than 0.01% (1/10,000) of the U.S. federal budget. Polls conducted by YouGov from 2022 through 2025 showed PBS and NPR to be among the most trusted media institutions in the United States and that trust in both was growing, while five surveys conducted by YouGov and the Pew Research Center from February through July 2025 found consistent majorities or pluralities of Americans supported continuing federal funding for PBS and NPR. Previously, in every year from 2004 through 2021, surveys of Americans had shown PBS to have been consistently ranked as the most trusted institution in comparison to commercial broadcast and cable television, newspapers, and streaming services. In January 2021, Americans valued tax dollars spent on PBS behind only military defense and oversight of food and drug safety.

After the passage of the rescission bill, the CPB announced on August 1, 2025, that it would lay off the majority of its staff by the end of the fiscal year on September 30, with only a skeleton crew staying on board until January 2026 to distribute any remaining funds and royalties. On January 5, 2026, the board of the CPB announced that it had voted to dissolve instead of remaining in a defunded state and potentially be “vulnerable to future political manipulation or misuse”.

== Board composition ==
The CPB was governed by a nominally nine-member board of directors selected by the president of the United States and confirmed by the Senate; they served six-year terms, and were allowed to continue serving until the end of the calendar year that their term ends or until their successor was seated on the board. Under the terms of the Public Broadcasting Act of 1967, the president could not appoint persons of the same political party to more than five of the nine CPB board seats. The final board had only three members.

The board of directors governed the CPB, set policy, and established programming priorities. The board appointed the president and chief executive officer, who then named the other corporate officers.

=== Board members ===
The CPB board as of April 10, 2025 was:

Position	Name	Party	Appointed by (year of confirmation)	Took office	Term expired
Chair	Ruby Calvert	Republican	Donald Trump (2018), Joe Biden (2022)	May 24, 2018	Upon CPB's shutdown
Member	Elizabeth Sembler	Republican	George W. Bush (2008), Barack Obama (2014), Joe Biden (2022)	October 2, 2008	Upon CPB's shutdown
Member	Diane Kaplan	Democratic	Joe Biden (2022)	December 20, 2022	Upon CPB's shutdown
Member	Laura Ross		Joe Biden (2022)		July 2025
Member	Tom Rothman		Joe Biden (2022)	2022	July 2025
Member	Vacant				
Member	Vacant				
Member	Vacant				
Member	Vacant				

== See also ==
- American Public Television
- Public Radio Exchange
- American Public Media
