= Rescissions Act of 2025 =

U.S. federal law

- Long title: To rescind certain budget authority proposed to be rescinded in special messages transmitted to the Congress by the President on June 3, 2025, in accordance with section 1012(a) of the Congressional Budget and Impoundment Control Act of 1974.
- Enacted by: the 119th United States Congress

Citations
- Public law: Pub. L. 119–28 (text) (PDF)
- Statutes at Large: 139 Stat. 467

Legislative history
- Introduced in the House as H.R. 4 by Steve Scalise (R–LA) on June 6, 2025; Passed the House on June 12, 2025 (214–212); Passed the Senate on July 17, 2025 (51–48) with amendment; House agreed to Senate amendment on July 18, 2025 (216–213); Signed into law by President Donald Trump on July 24, 2025

The Rescissions Act of 2025 is a law passed by the 119th United States Congress. It rescinds $7.9 billion in funding from international assistance programs and $1.1 billion in funding from the Corporation for Public Broadcasting (CPB). After failing to advance budget measures to eliminate federal funding for public broadcasting during the first Trump administration, amid increased Trump's conflict with the media since his second term, President Trump requested a rescission bill to eliminate federal funding for the CPB, which passed in both chambers of the Republican-controlled Congress largely along party lines in July 2025.

Despite opposition from moderate Republicans, the act passed the Republican-led House on June 12, 2025. An amended version passed the Republican-led Senate on July 17, 2025, and was agreed to in the House on the next day. President Trump signed the bill into law on July 24, 2025.

== Overview ==
A rescission bill rescinds funding that was previously passed in an appropriations bill. As is procedure, President Trump submitted the bill to Congress. Pursuant to the Impoundment Control Act of 1974, rescission bills cannot be fillibustered in the Senate. The original House version of the bill included $9.4 billion in funding cuts. Specifically, $8.3 billion was to be cut from international assistance programs, mostly from the United States Agency for International Development. The President's Emergency Plan for AIDS Relief (PEPFAR) was also set to see funding cuts. Additionally, $1.1 billion was to be cut from the Corporation for Public Broadcasting. The Corporation for Public Broadcasting provided funding for local noncommercial broadcasters, many of whom aired programming from National Public Radio (NPR) and the Public Broadcasting Service (PBS).

The Senate amended the bill to remove $400 million in cuts to PEPFAR, place exemptions on funding cuts for programs that treat and prevent major diseases (HIV/AIDS, malaria, and tuberculosis) and programs that support nutrition or maternal and child health, protect foreign aid for Jordan and Egypt, protect foreign aid for a fund that works to counter influence from China, and exempt funding cuts for programs that pay U.S. farmers to produce food that is distributed in poor countries.

== Votes ==
=== First passage in the House ===
The bill passed the House on June 12, 2025 in a 214–212 vote. All present Republicans except Mark Amodei of Nevada, Brian Fitzpatrick of Pennsylvania, Nicole Malliotakis of New York, and Mike Turner of Ohio, all moderate Republicans, voted for the bill. Two other moderate Republicans, Nick LaLota of New York and Don Bacon of Nebraska, initially voted no but changed their votes. Bacon said he changed his vote after receiving assurances from House Republican leadership that PBS would be fully funded for the 2026 U.S. federal budget and that global aid cuts would not affect funding for the President's Emergency Plan for AIDS Relief. All present Democrats voted against the bill. Two Republicans and four Democrats did not vote. If all absent members had voted with the majority of their party, the bill would have failed.

=== Passage in the Senate ===
In the early morning of July 17, 2025, the Senate passed an amended version of the act in a 51–48 vote. Moderate Republicans Susan Collins of Maine and Lisa Murkowski of Alaska voted against the bill with all present Democrats. Democratic Senator Tina Smith of Minnesota missed the vote after being hospitalized.

=== Second passage in the House ===
The House had to vote to pass the amended act by July 18, or the bill would have become invalid. Just after midnight on July 18, the House passed the act through a procedural rule, which also teed up an unrelated vote on U.S. Department of Defense funding. Moderate Republicans Brian Fitzpatrick of Pennsylvania and Mike Turner of Ohio joined all present Democrats in voting against the rule.

== Impact ==
On August 1, 2025, the CPB announced it would shut down in January 2026. Public media advocates argued that it would result in the closure of some stations and hamper access to emergency alerts in rural communities; the CPB's defunding and resulting closure would result in some public television and radio stations imposing staffing and programming cuts (with some electing to drop PBS and/or NPR programming altogether).

Widespread station closures did not occur. Donor surges and philanthropic efforts (including the Public Media Bridge Fund) helped stabilize many stations. System-wide impacts included roughly 550 layoffs, programming reductions at numerous stations, some stations dropping or reducing national programming, and ongoing vulnerability for rural outlets that had depended most heavily on federal support.

== See also ==
- Executive Order 14290
