= National Association of Educational Broadcasters =

American student organization

The National Association of Educational Broadcasters (NAEB) was a US organization of broadcasters with aims to share or coordinate educational programmes. It was founded as the Association of college and University Broadcasting Stations (ACUBS) in 1925 as a result of Fourth National Radio Conference, held by the U.S. Department of Commerce.

It was primarily a "program idea exchange" with 25 members that occasionally attempted to rebroadcast programs shared between them. The original constitution for the organization read:

"Believing that radio is in its very nature one of the most important factors in our national and international welfare, we, the representatives of the institutions of higher learning, engaged in educational broadcasting, do associate ourselves together to promote, by mutual cooperation and united effort, the dissemination of knowledge to the end that both the technical and educational feature of broadcasting may be extended to all."

ACUBS held its first annual conference July 1 and 2, 1930 in Columbus, Ohio joining with the Institution of Education by Radio.

In September 1934, the organization rewrote its constitution, and changed its name from the Association of College University Broadcasting Stations (ACUBS) to the "National Association of Educational Broadcasters."

In 1938, NAEB persuaded the Federal Communications Commission to reserve five radio channels for educational broadcasting.

In 1945, the FCC reserved five of the 40 channels in new high-frequency band for Non-commercial educational stations. There were initially planned to be AM services; however, they eventually manifested as FM ones.

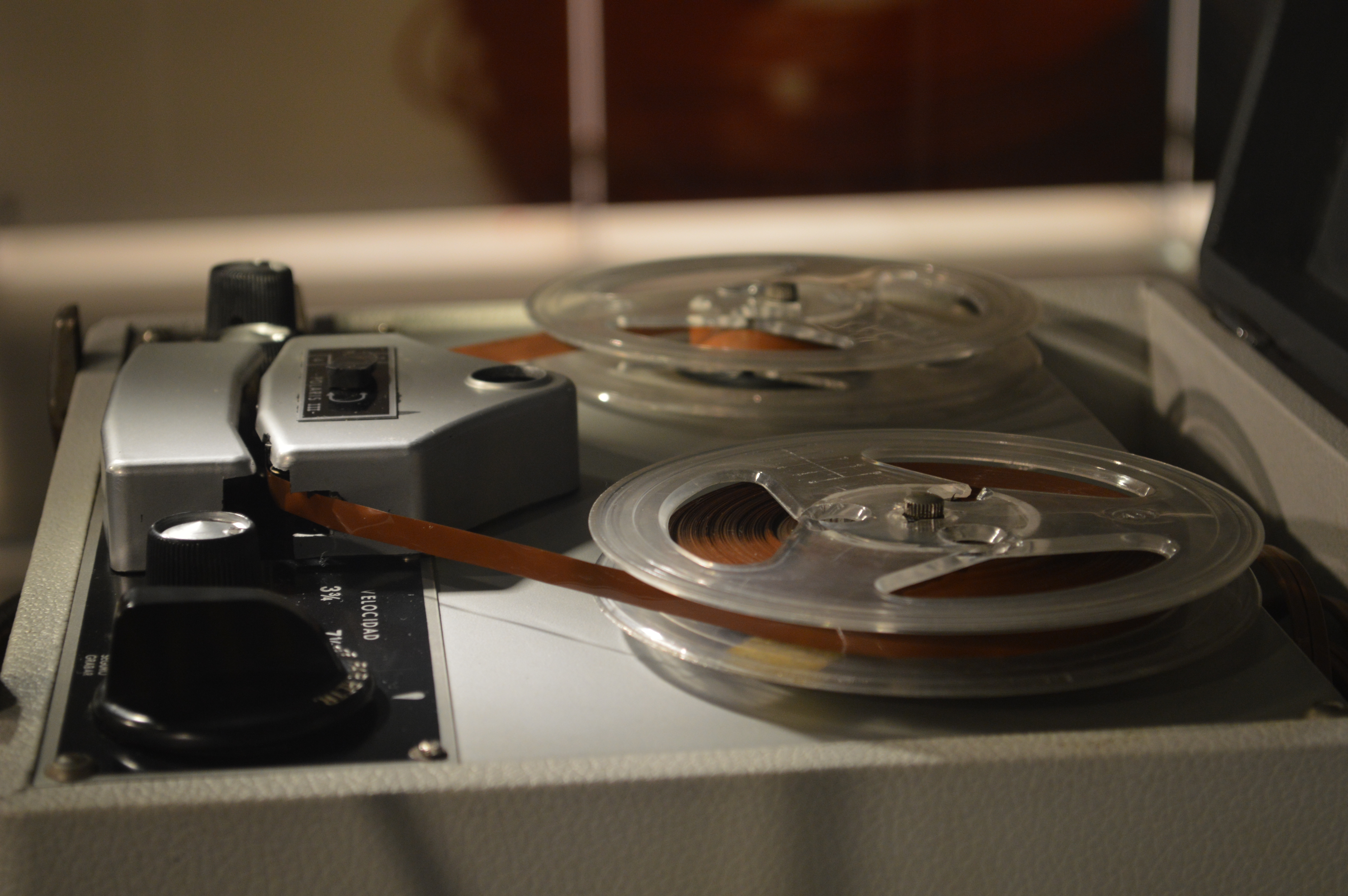
1960's reel-to-reel magnetic tape player

NAEB's station members began an ad hoc tape exchange network in the fall of 1949. The director of New York City's municipal station WNYC (AM), Seymour N. Siegel, made five copies of a local newspaper's public forum discussions which were shared east-to-west by NAEB stations across the country, eventually reaching 22 of NAEB's member stations.

- By February 1950 the NAEB was offering taped recordings of documentary series, health discussions, U.S. Army Band concerts, BBC dramas, etc.
- In January 1951 the headquarters for tape production and distribution moved to the University of Illinois, maintained by its Division of Communications.
- In January 1952 the "NAEB Tape Network Brochure" was published for its then 80+ radio station members, listing available series, program run times and acquisition procedures.
- In 1960, NAEB's tape processing facility moved to Washington, D.C.
- NAEB's historical tape archive spans 1952-1973 and consists of 5,063 audiotape reels. Its program inventory transitioned to National Public Radio (NPR) in 1975, then to the University of Maryland Libraries in October 1990.

NAEB merged with the Association of Education by Radio-Television in 1956. It was reorganized in 1963 with two new divisions, Educational Television Stations and National Educational Radio. These divisions lasted until 1973, when they were diminished. Their roles were taken over by Public Broadcasting Service (PBS) and Association of Public Radio Stations (APRS) respectively. The APRS became the "Washington lobby and public relations arm of CPB-qualified radio stations." The APRS merged with National Public Radio (NPR) in 1977, which allowed NPR to provide "leadership of a full-fledged membership organization providing member stations with training, program promotion and management, and representing the interests of public radio stations before Congress, the FCC and other regulatory organizations." Before this merger, NPR was "largely a production and distribution center", so the merger was influential in making NPR what it is today.

Until it folded in 1981, NAEB was public broadcasting's primary voice, forum and program distributor.

== See also ==
- American Archive of Public Broadcasting
- National Educational Radio Network
- National Public Radio
- Chalmers Marquis, a former Vice President of the NAEB and broadcasting advocate
- Burton Paulu, a former President of the NAEB and manager of radio station KUOM
