= Broadcasting in the United States =

Broadcasting in the United States began with experiments with Wireless transmission during the 19th century, with varying degrees of success. These transmissions were initially by radio hobbyists fascinated with the technology. Once techniques were perfected, radio became a necessity for military and commercial users alike. Eventually, broadcasting would come to have a major impact throughout the country. Growth divided television broadcasting into several genres, such as fiction, news, sports, and reality television. Cable television provided more channels, especially for entertainment. By the late 20th century radio (sound) broadcasting had similarly divided, with stations specializing in a particular musical genre, or news or sports.

== History ==
=== Beginnings ===
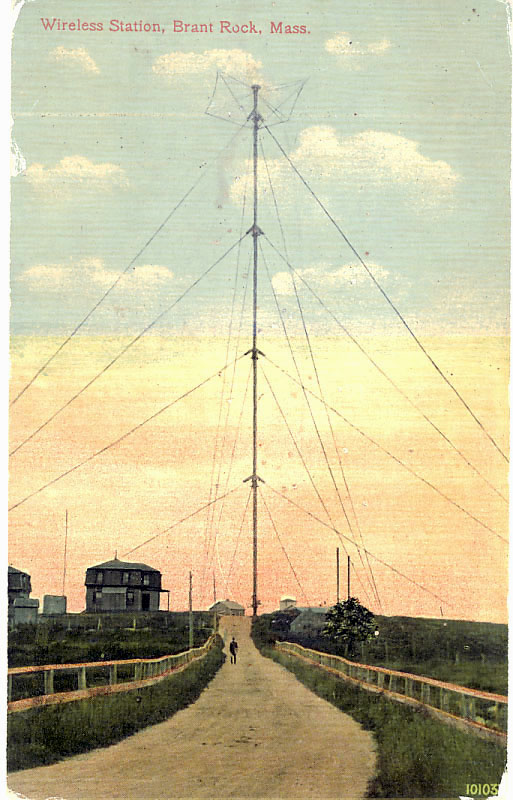
Circa 1910 Penny postcard depicting Fessenden's radio tower at Brant Rock, Massachusetts

In 1901 Reginald Aubrey Fessenden made a significant step toward the possibility of broadcasting when he succeeded in superimposing a human voice onto a continuous Hertzian wave. Success in this experiment created a need for more advanced equipment, including an alternating-current generator large enough to produce the necessary power to carry his transmissions. Fessenden received the backing of T.H. Given and Hay Walker Jr. who contributed money to purchase a powerful generator from General Electric. He had it installed at Brant Rock, MA, and at 9pm local time on December 24, 1906, he began a broadcast that could be heard by several United Fruit Company ships at sea. After an introduction, the program consisted of the following:

- a recording of Handel's "Largo" on an Ediphone
- Fessenden's own live violin performance of "O Holy Night," singing the last verse as he played
- a recitation of seasonal passages from the Bible, by what was planned to be Fessenden's wife Helen and his secretary Miss Bent; when the women suffered from mike fright, Fessenden read the passages

The broadcast with Christmas greetings and a request for listeners to write him and report on the broadcast wherever they were. Fessenden received letters from many of his listeners who heard him from as far away as the West Indies.

Many individuals continued to experiment with their own methods of broadcasting. For example, Charles Herrold of San Jose, California sent out broadcasts as early as April 1909 from his Herrold School electronics institute in downtown San Jose, using the identification San Jose Calling, and then a variety of different call signs as the United States Department of Commerce began to regulate radio. His station was first called FN, then SJN (probably illegally). By 1912, the government began requiring radio operators to obtain licenses to send out signals. Herrold received licenses for 6XF and 6XE (a mobile transmitter) in 1916. He was on the air daily for nearly a decade when World War I interrupted operations.

The involvement of the United States in World War I would bring about changes that would take broadcasting out of the hobbyist's workshop and on to a grand stage. The United States Navy would use broadcasting to relay messages between ships, airplanes, and shore stations throughout the war. The result of the Navy's demand for broadcasting was the mass production of radio equipment with simplified construction and operation requirements so they could be readily used by the common man. Receivers like the Westinghouse SCR-70 were a single, self-contained unit that required minimal technical ability. Following the war, these units were so plentiful and reasonably priced that virtually every American could own one. This wide availability led to the realization of a market which included everyone.

=== Commercial development ===
The formation of broadcasting corporations was necessary to produce the capital needed to reach a large audience which would serve as a broad consumer base. Many experimenters created their own corporations including Fessenden's “National Electric Signaling Company.” Most of these corporations however, did not survive for very long with the exception of the "Marconi Wireless Telegraph Company of America (American Marconi).” This company would eventually give way to the Radio Corporation of America (RCA) on November 10, 1919, when American Marconi sold off all of its assets.

To compete with RCA (which was a subsidiary of General Electric), Westinghouse Broadcasting entered the market, hoping for sale of its radio sets and publicity. On October 27, 1920, the Department of Commerce granted Westinghouse a permit to broadcast in Pittsburgh, PA under the call letters KDKA. They began the first commercial broadcasts in the United States on November 2, 1920, to report the results of that year's presidential election. They used a hand-wound phonograph to play music over the air to fill time between returns.

KDKA would prove to be a very successful broadcasting station as a result of superior Westinghouse equipment that was developed from the company's acquisition of the Armstrong-Pupin patents. Rather than compete with Westinghouse, General Electric (GE), RCA, and AT&T formed an alliance with the company on June 30, 1921. Combining the patents owned by all four companies, they would work to improve the broadcasting process and increase the quality of receivers.

While Westinghouse, GE, and RCA were primarily focused on the indirect profits of broadcasting which would result from producing and selling radio receivers to the general public, AT&T focused on finding a way of making direct profit from broadcasts themselves. They created the concept of “toll broadcasting” which allowed anyone to use a licensed AT&T radio station to broadcast any message of their choosing. Customers would be charged a fee based on when they wanted to purchase time (certain times during the day were more valuable) and how long they wished to be on the air. It was from this concept that the idea of selling blocks of time to advertisers to fund broadcasts was born. The first such “radio toll station” was WBAY (later consolidated with WEAF) in New York City and it went into operation on July 25, 1922.

Westinghouse, GE, RCA, and AT&T had all become quite successful, so much so that the federal government became interested in their dominance of the broadcasting world. Various members of Congress were worried about the concentration of power these companies had, especially because it concerned the flow of information. On March 3, 1923, the Federal Trade Commission (FTC) was asked by Congress to open an investigation into the radio industry to find out if violations of anti-trust laws were being committed.

Upon completion of its study entitled: Report of the Federal Trade Commission on the Radio Industry', the FTC filed a formal complaint with Congress that Westinghouse, GE, RCA, and AT&T had "combined and conspired for the purpose of, and with the effect of, restraining competition and creating a monopoly in the manufacture, purchase and sale in interstate commerce of radio devices...and in domestic and transoceanic communication and broadcasting." Congressional hearings on the matter would begin in May 1924.

Meanwhile, disputes between Westinghouse, GE, RCA, and AT&T would lead to a significant shift in power in the broadcasting industry. Westinghouse, GE, and RCA would force AT&T out of broadcasting altogether and form the National Broadcasting Company (NBC). RCA would own 50% of NBC while GE and Westinghouse would own 30% and 20% respectively.

=== Developing networks ===
The National Broadcasting Company began regular broadcasting in 1926, with telephone links between New York and other Eastern cities. NBC became the dominant radio network, splitting into Red and Blue networks.

Despite the power shift, AT&T maintained the ability to share patents with Westinghouse, GE, and RCA. This led to the Justice Department filing an anti-trust suit against all four companies in May 1930. To avoid trial, AT&T withdrew from the patent alliance in 1931 and the remaining three companies developed their own divorcement plan which left RCA as the sole owner of NBC.

A Federal Communications Commission decision in 1939 required NBC to divest itself of its Blue Network. That decision was sustained by the Supreme Court in a 1943 decision, National Broadcasting Co. v. United States, which established the framework that the "scarcity" of radio-frequency meant that broadcasting was subject to greater regulation than other media. This Blue Network became the American Broadcasting Company (ABC). Around 1946, ABC, NBC, and CBS began regular television broadcasts. Another TV network, the DuMont Television Network, was founded earlier, but was disbanded in 1956.

=== 1950s and 1960s ===
Television began to replace radio as the chief source of revenue for broadcasting networks. Although many radio programs continued through this decade, including Gunsmoke and The Guiding Light, by 1960 networks had ceased producing entertainment programs.

As radio stopped producing formal fifteen-minute to hourly programs, a new format developed. "Top 40" was based on a continuous rotation of short pop songs presented by a "disc jockey." Famous disc jockeys in the era included Alan Freed, Dick Clark, Don Imus and Wolfman Jack. Top 40 playlists were theoretically based on record sales; however, record companies began to bribe disc jockeys to play selected artists, in what was called payola.

In the 1950s, American television networks introduced broadcasts in color. (The Federal Communications Commission approved the world's first monochrome-compatible color television standard in December 1953. The first network colorcast followed on January 1, 1954, with NBC transmitting the annual Tournament of Roses Parade in Pasadena, Calif. to over 20 stations across the country.) An educational television network, National Educational Television (NET), predecessor to PBS, was founded.

== See also ==
- Cable Communications Policy Act of 1984
- Cable radio
- Cable television
- Cable Television Consumer Protection and Competition Act of 1992
- Commercial broadcasting
- Communications Act of 1934
- Digital radio
- Digital television
- FCC v. Pacifica Foundation (1978)
- Internet radio
- Narrowcasting
- Podcast
- Public-access television
- Public Broadcasting Act of 1967
- Public broadcasting in the United States
- Radio in the United States
- Radio Act of 1912
- Radio Act of 1927
- Reno v. American Civil Liberties Union (1997)
- Satellite radio
- Satellite television
- Telecommunications Act of 1996
- Television in the United States
- Webcast
