= Ghana Community Radio Network =

Ghana Community Radio Network (GCRN)
- Industry: News media
- Founded: Accra
- Headquarters: Ghana
- Number of locations: Ghana
- Area served: Ghana
- Products: News media
- Website: gcrna.org.gh

The Ghana Community Radio Network (GCRN) is an association of Community Radio stations in Ghana broadcasting in local languages across rural communities nationally. GCRN was established in 1999 as a community radio service which offers a third model of radio broadcasting in addition to commercial and public broadcasting. Thereby association's aim is: "GCRN aims to enhance the use and build the capacity of community radio to enable marginalized communities and groups to generate and share their knowledge and experience, to participate in discourse and decision-making at every level, to develop the richness of their culture, and to strengthen their communities as part of the national and global family."

Ghana Community Radio Network (GCRN) provides a mechanism for enabling individuals, groups, and communities to tell their own stories, to share experiences and, in a media-rich world, to become creators and contributors of media, as a nonprofit organisation.

== History ==
GCRN since its inception has its primary aim of localising mass communication within Ghana audience as it is believed broadcasting in local languages are being overlooked by commercial or mass-media broadcaster. The association advocates that a reorientation of programming and organization would improve drastically Radio’s contribution to education and development.

According to DEVEX, "the association has 19 members on-air. They serve communities in 8 out of the 10 Regions of Ghana. Between them, they broadcast in 16 indigenous languages, including many that would otherwise leave their communities un-voiced." In addition, GCRN counts 12 Community Radio initiatives. These are initiatives that are awaiting their frequencies. Once they get on-air, the remaining two Regions would have at least one Community Radio station."

In 2005, Prof. Alex Quarmyne, the Executive Director of Radio Ada in Accra, said: "There are only six community radio stations in Ghana – Radio Ada; Radio Peace in Winneba; Radio Progress in Wa; Royals FM in Wenchi; Dormaa FM in Dormaa Ahenkro and Radio Afram Plains in Donkokrom, which has just began operations." Radio Gurune is also part of the community radio network in Ghana.

Ghana Community Radio Network is supported by the World Bank (WB) in Ghana and UNESCO for its education and Media training of young people.

== See also ==
- International Freedom of Expression Exchange
- World Association of Community Radio Broadcasters (AMARC)
- CRAOL (Community Radio Forum of Ireland – Irish Sector Body)
- Community Media Association (UK Sector Body)
- Prometheus Radio Project
- Bangladesh NGOs Network for Radio and Communication (Bangladesh Sector Body)
- List of Community Radio Stations in the United States
- National Federation of Community Broadcasters (US association)
