= Association of Austrian Community Broadcasters =

Peak body for community broadcasters

- Verband Freier Rundfunk Österreich
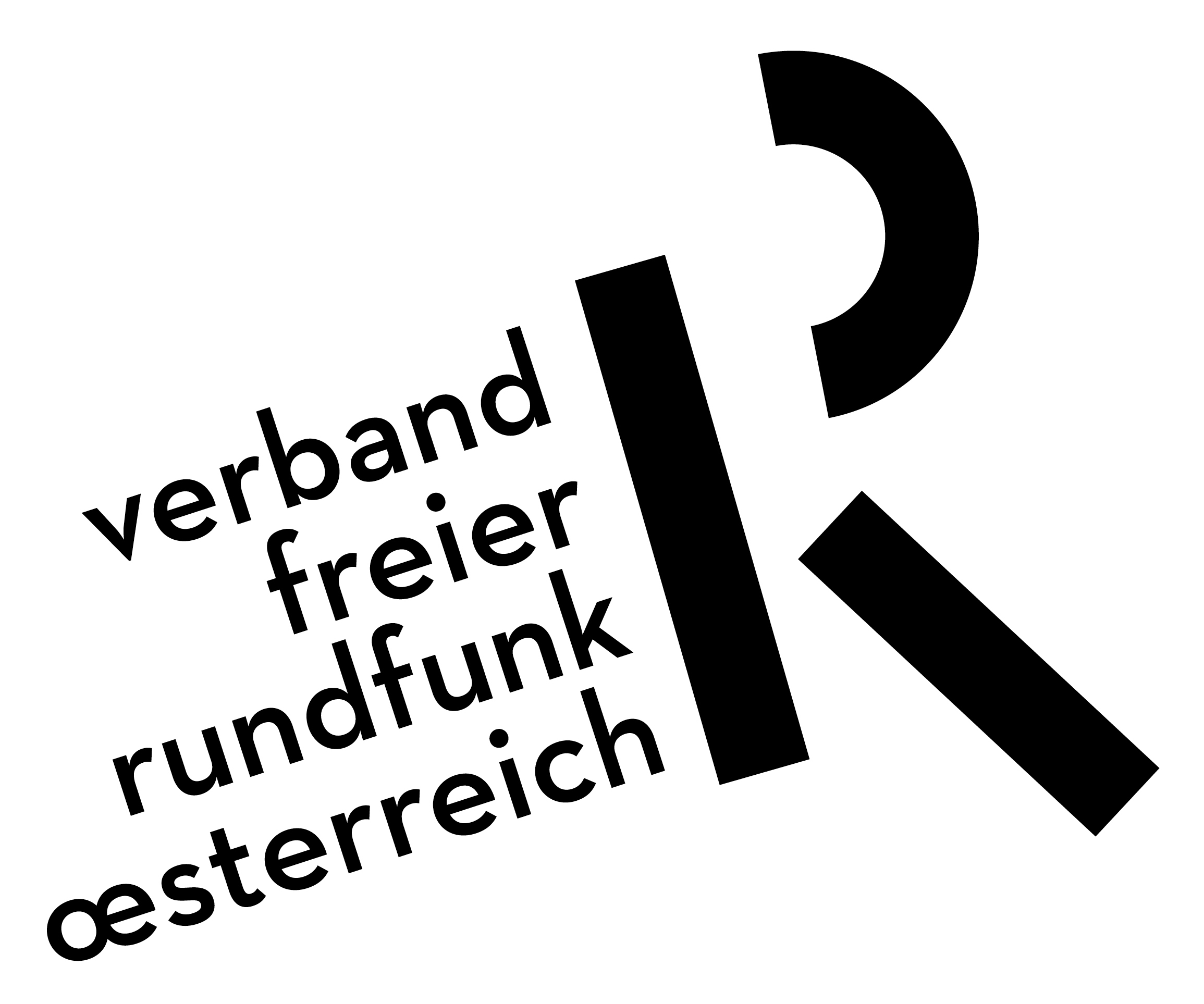
- Logo 2020, Association of Austrian Community Broadcasters
- Formation: March 13, 1993; 33 years ago
- Founded at: Vienna, Austria
- Type: Nonprofit, NGO
- Legal status: Association
- Purpose: Lobby organisation
- Location: Vienna, Austria
- Coordinates: 48.2029169°N 16.3455775°E
- Members: 16 full members, 1 associate member
- CEO: Helga Schwarzwald
- Key people: Board: Christian Jungwirth (Chair), Charlotte Trippolt (Deputy Chair), Alf Altendorf (Treasurer), Michaela Kramesch (Secretary), Hilde Unterberger (Deputy Secretary), Angelika Hödl (Deputy Treasurer)
- Main organ: Board
- Staff: 2
- Website: www.freier-rundfunk.at
- Formerly called: Alliance of Community Radio Austria

The Association of Austrian Community Broadcasters (former name: Alliance of Community Radio Austria) is the alliance and lobbying group of the Austrian community radio and television stations. The association was founded in 1993 and has 16 members.

== Members ==
Full members are:

- Radio Agora (Klagenfurt)
- B138 (Kirchdorf an der Krems)
- Campus & City Radio 94.4 (Sankt Pölten)
- Radio Freequenns (Ennstal)
- Freirad 105.9 (Innsbruck)
- Radio Freistadt (Freistadt)
- Radio FRO (Linz)
- Radio Salzkammergut (FRS; Bad Ischl)
- Radio Ypsilon (Hollabrunn)
- Radio Helsinki (Graz)
- Radio Orange (Vienna)
- Radio Proton (Dornbirn)
- Radiofabrik (Salzburg)
- Radio OP (Oberpullendorf)
- Okto (Vienna)
- FS1 (Salzburg)

Associate members are:

- Aufdraht (Langenlois) (Project radio)

== See also ==
- Alliance of Community Television Austria
- CRAOL (Ireland)
- Community Media Association (UK)
- Alliance for Community Media (US)
- World Association of Community Radio Broadcasters (Worldwide)
