= Local-access television =

Local-access television may refer to:

- Public, educational, and government access, cable television narrowcasting and specialty channels
  - Public-access television, narrowcast, non-commercial mass media where the general public can create content
  - Educational television, the use of television programs in the field of distance education
  - Government-access television, specialty television channel created by government entities
  - Leased access, FCC-mandated airtime for use by independent cable programmers

== See also ==
- List of public-access TV stations in the United States
