= FS1 (Austrian TV channel) =

Community television station in Salzburg

Coordinates: 47.803873°N 13.045840°E

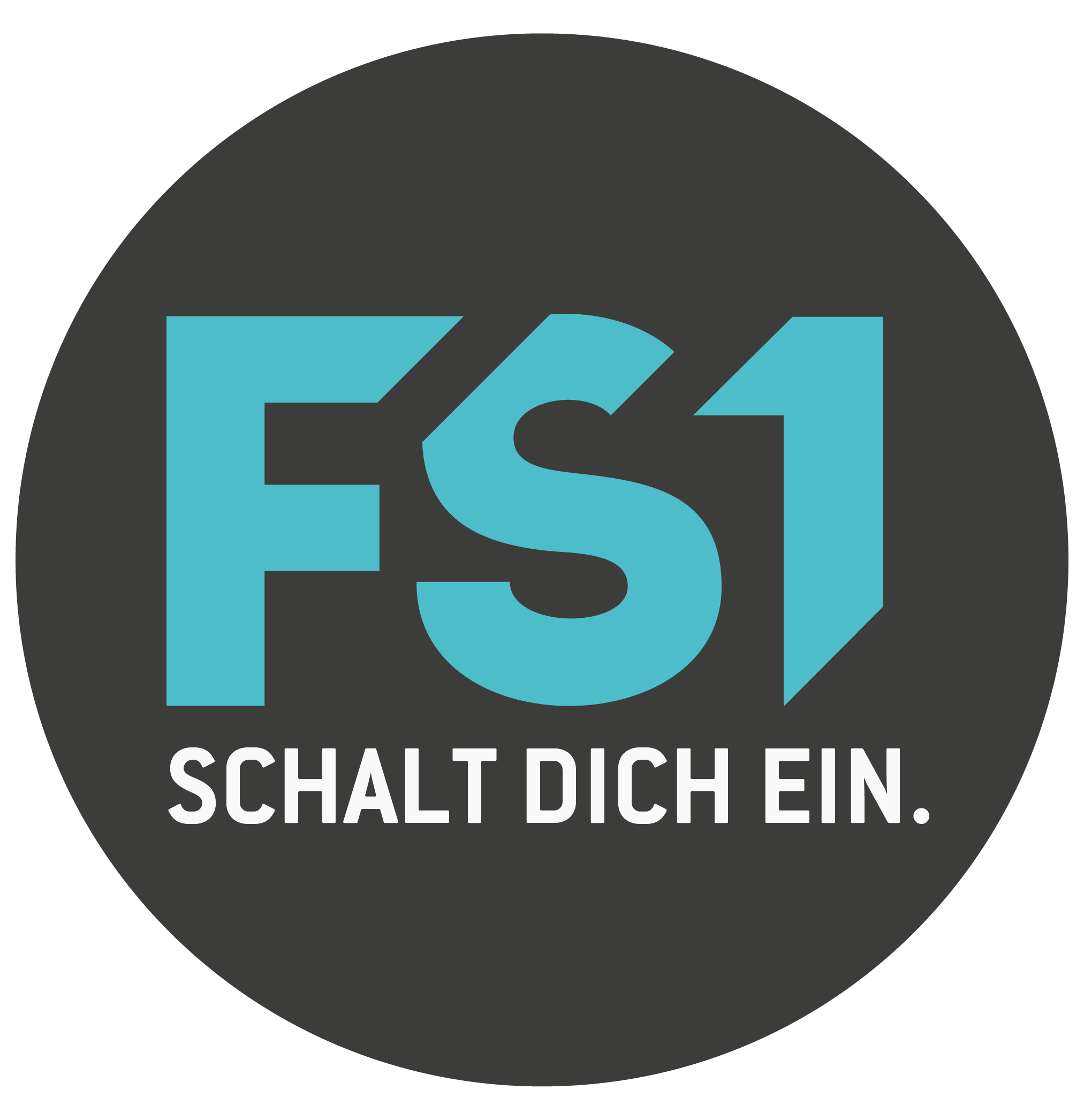
- Country: Austria
- Broadcast area: Salzburg (state) over Cable, Austria over IPTV
- Affiliates: Radiofabrik
- Headquarters: Salzburg

Programming
- Language(s): German, English
- Picture format: 720p

Ownership
- Owner: Community TV Salzburg Ltd. (Association of Program Makers 24%, Radiofabrik 24%, IMB 24%. Dachverband 24%, Individuals 4%)
- Key people: Alf Altendorf (CFO), Sophie Huber-Lachner (CEO)

History
- Launched: 16 February 2012
- Founder: Alf Altendorf, Markus Weisheitinger

Links
- Webcast: FS1
- Website: https://fs1.tv

FS1 (or FS1 - Community TV Salzburg) is a non-commercial community television channel in Salzburg (Austria). Next to the Community TV okto in Vienna and dorf in Linz, it is the third non-commercial broadcaster with a 24-hour full (as opposed to specialized) program in Austria.

Since the launch on 16 February 2012, the channel has been broadcasting via DVB-C in many areas of the state of Salzburg. Over IPTV, the station is available nationwide.

== History ==
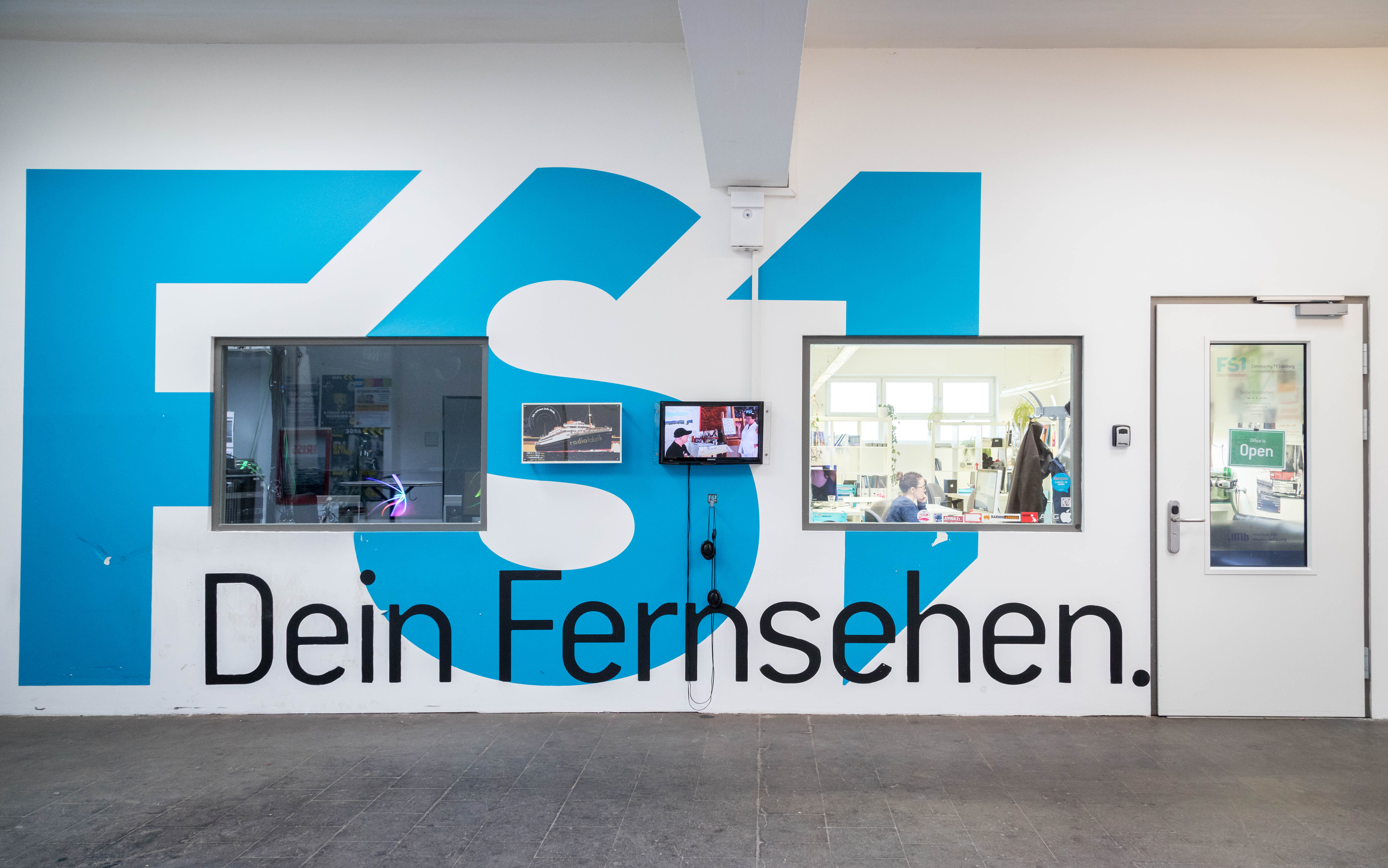
FS1 office & studio at the cultural site of Kunstquartier (2018)

The original idea and an impulse to create FS1 was given by the Salzburg free radio station Radiofabrik. The project was introduced to the public in 2009 and designed on the legal basis of the Non-Commercial Radio and Television Broadcasting Funding Initiative (NKRF) of the Austrian Republic, created in 2010. This initiative provided a financial opportunity for creating a community television broadcaster in Austria. The Institute of Media Education (Institut für Medienbildung, IMB) was the first organisation to support the project, joined by the Salzburg umbrella organization of cultural sites and individuals (Dachverband Salzburger Kulturstätten, DSK). The community of Salzburg was positive about the idea.

Alf Altendorf (formerly working for TIV, engaged in the establishment of Okto, Radiofabrik commercial director) and Markus Weisheitinger-Herrmann (employee of the former IMB) founded FS1. They remain its managing directors until now. The DSK managing director Thomas Randisek supported the new TV station as an volunteering activist. A sponsoring association was registered in 2010.

The city and state of Salzburg delayed the requested funds, explaining the delay, inter alia, with previous bankruptcies of several commercial television channels such as Salzburg TV, Jedermann TV, and Salzburg Plus.

This situation provoked many disputes about media policy. In mid-2011, the grants previously provided by the Austrian regulatory institution of radio and television broadcasting (Rundfunk und Telekom Regulierungs-GmbH, RTR) were returned due to the lack of local funding and the associated financial risks. The Culture Committee of the City of Salzburg confirmed the partial funding at the end of 2011. Because of the conflicts, the youth organizations akzente and Spektrum withdrew from the sponsoring association.

At the end of 2011, a consortium of Radiofabrik, DSK and IMB decided to implement the FS1 project in 2012, in spite of the resistance of local authorities.

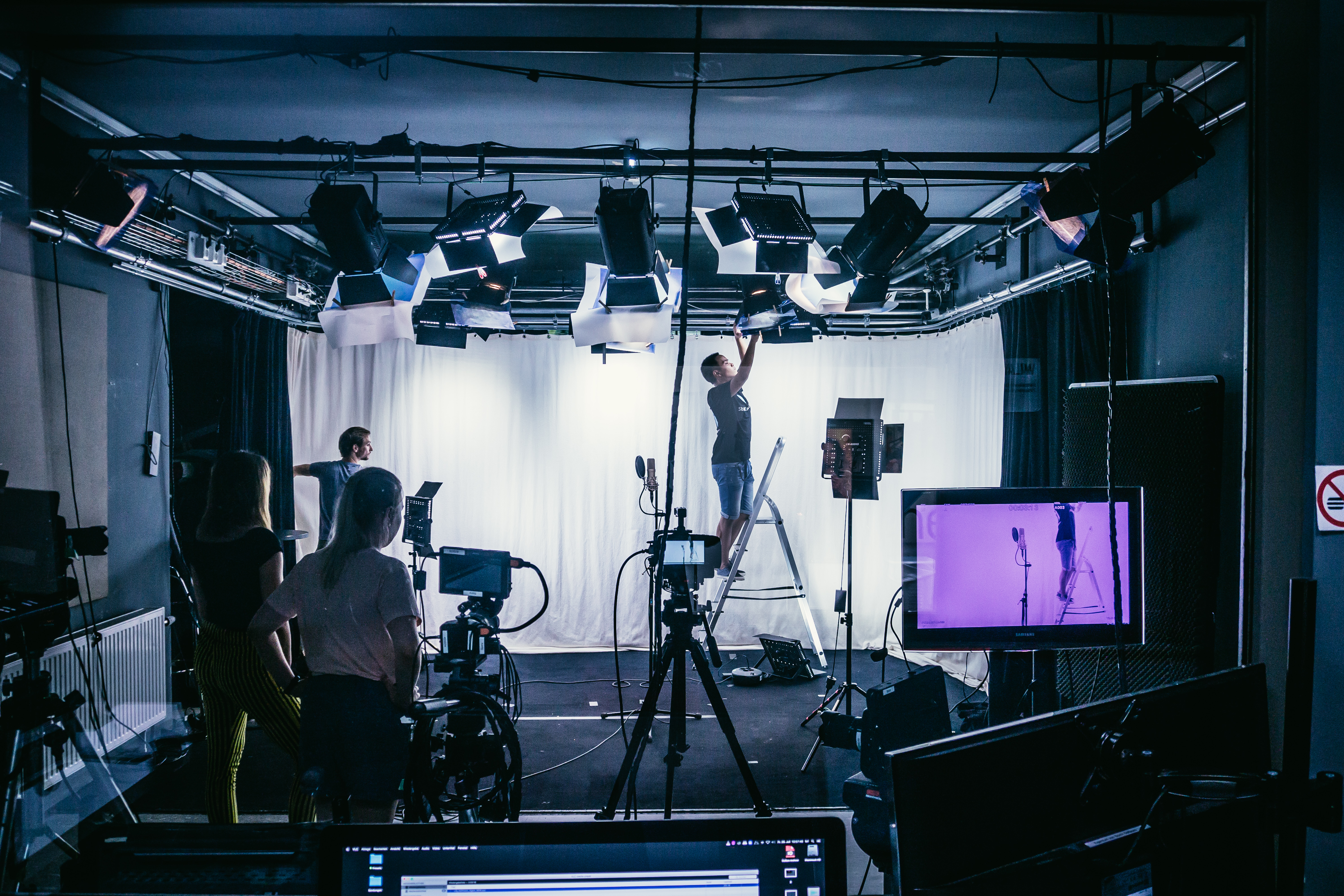
FS1 studio (2019)

On 16 February 2012, the FS1 TV station went on air in the cable network of Salzburg AG.

The State of Salzburg has also been involved as a sponsor since April 2012.

In May 2012, the sponsoring association of FS1 was converted into a non-profit organization. Radiofabrik, IMB, DSK, the producers' association, and the founders of the project became its shareholders.

The new studio was designed from scratch and opened in Bergstrasse in June 2012.

The broadcaster's infrastructures have been managed by the subsidiary "FS1 Infrastructure GesmbH" since December 2013.

Since 2014, FS1 has been organizing the Civilmedia conference together with Radiofabrik.

FS1 has been broadcasting in HD since the end of 2016 and can also be received on A1.TV's network.

== Projects ==
FS1 develops projects for networking, media education, and the film industry.

- Civilmedia, conference, in cooperation with Radiofabrik since 2014
- Medienwerkstatt Salzburg, media education platform, in cooperation with Radiofabrik, DasKino and others (since 2019)
- filmedition: online Salzburg, presentation of Salzburg local films, in cooperation with the city and state of Salzburg (since 2012)

=== Juvinale ===
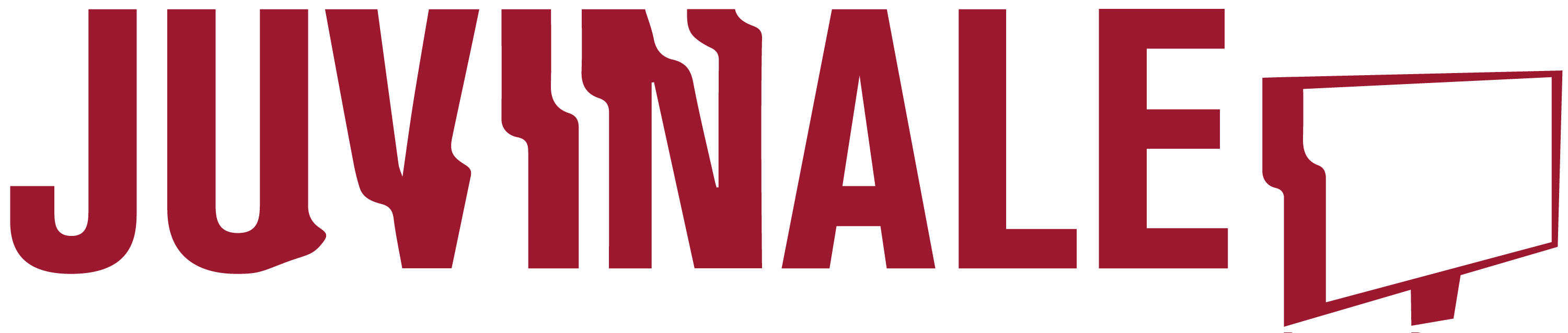
Juvinale festival logo (2017)

Since the Diagonale festival moved to Graz in 1998, there has been no regular film festival in Salzburg. The international youth film festival Juvinale focuses on young filmmaking and has been held biennially since 2017. Partners of the festival are the city and state of Salzburg as well as the local Economic Chamber.

== Program ==
The media authority KommAustria classifies the broadcaster within the guideline framework of the Non-Commercial Broadcasting Fund as Community TV. The funding is provided under condition of compliance with the guidelines of the NKRF and the program creation and coordination in the sense of the commitment to the Charter for Community Television in Austria of the Alliance Community Television Austria (Verband Community Fernsehen Österreich, VCFÖ).

The program is ad-free. The shows are produced by the Salzburg locals and civil society organizations on a voluntary basis. The program is focused on the spheres of art and culture, music scene, youth, social affairs and education. All content is coordinated and then broadcast via the station. The FS1 producers receive special training for TV content creation on the workshops and courses of the FS1 Academy.

The TV channel rebroadcasts the US news program Democracy Now!.

== Organization ==
Owner and editor of FS1 is a non-profit limited company. Shareholders are the association of the program creators, Salzburg's community radio Radiofabrik, the Institute for Media Education (IMB), the umbrella organization of cultural sites and individuals. Through participation of the producers in the ownership structure of FS1, the station can be considered as the first democratic television in Austria. In September 2018, the IMB sold its shares to the cultural center ARGEkultur Salzburg and Lebenshilfe, the organization training and supporting people with intellectual disabilities.

=== Finances ===
The organization is financed by government grants and self-generated income.

== Broadcast area and reception ==
FS1 has been receivable since February 2012 via DVB-C in the cable network of Salzburg AG in the state of Salzburg, Schladming, and Ausseerland. The station also runs a live stream of the program as a simulcast.

Since January 2017, FS1 has been broadcast on A1 Kabel TV's (A1 Telekom Austria) IPTV network.

== Partnerships ==
FS1 is member of the umbrella organization of Salzburg's cultural sites (DSK), the Association of Austrian Community Broadcasters, the Alliance of Community Television Austria (VCFÖ), and the Community Media Forum Europe.
