= Alliance for Community Media =

PEG cable lobbying organization

The Alliance for Community Media (ACM), is an educational, advocacy and lobbying organization in the United States which represents Public, educational, and government access (PEG) cable TV organizations and community media centers throughout the country.

The ACM was founded in 1976 as the National Federation of Local Cable Programmers (NFLCP), with the stated mission to “protect and increase freedom of expression, diversity of ideas and community communication through electronic media”. The mission statement has evolved over the years to “Promoting civic engagement through community media”. The ACM works to protect the interests of community media centers and those who use PEG facilities and equipment to promote localism and diversity in programming through cable television and the Internet. They have offices in Washington, DC, with three employees and roughly $600,000 annual revenue.

== History ==
The predecessor to the ACM, the NFLCP, was formed in 1976 by a group of media activists based in the Alternate Media Center (AMC), a New York University (NYU)-based organization created by American documentary filmmaker George C. Stoney and Red Burns to encourage citizens to tell their own stories through video production. The NFLCP held its first national convention and Hometown USA video awards in 1978 in Madison, Wisconsin, at which time a board was established to lead the non-profit organization. The NFLCP persuaded industry and government regulatory agencies to dedicate a portion of the new cable broadcast spectrum to public-access television, a requirement that was codified in federal communications law in 1984. Part of the agreement was to set aside bandwidth and funding for TV channels dedicated to public, educational, and governmental access programming (PEG).

The 1970s and 1980s were the heyday of access television, with hundreds of TV operations springing up in communities around the country. The ACM grew in response to the unique needs of this group of professionals, many of whom ran small operations that required them to multitask as program producer, manager, technical support, and more. The ACM facilitated training, networking, and resources to support this specialized role.

In 1992 the organization was renamed “Alliance for Community Media” so as to recognize the scope to be more than “just cable”. In the following decades new forms of media delivery became incorporated into the average PEG operation and by extension, into the agenda of the ACM's educational programs.

== Organization ==
The ACM is a professional membership and advocacy organization. Originally established as a single non-profit entity, the ACM shifted its membership and lobbying activities in 2011 to a 501(c)6 organization, while maintaining 501(c)3 status for the newly named Foundation for the Alliance for Community Media – to manage educational and charitable endeavors such as the Hometown Awards and the Emerging Leaders Institute.

To help in the coordination of national activities, the Alliance for Community Media divides the U.S. into regions, most of which are governed by regional boards and represented on the national ACM board. As of 2023, the active ACM regions are:

- ACM NorthEast Region (New York, Vermont, New Hampshire, Maine, Massachusetts, Connecticut, Rhode Island)
- ACM West Region (Arizona, California, Colorado, Hawaii, New Mexico and Nevada)
- ACM Central States Region (Kentucky, Indiana, Michigan, Ohio)
- ACM Northwest Region (Alaska, Alberta, British Columbia, Idaho, Montana, Oregon, Utah, Washington, and Wyoming)
- ACM MidWest Region (Illinois, Iowa, Kansas, Minnesota, Missouri, Nebraska, North Dakota, South Dakota, Wisconsin)

Historically the ACM also had Southeast, Southwest and Mid-Atlantic Regions, but these dissolved for lack of activity. In 2022 – February 15 – the Jersey Access Group (JAG, headquartered in Metuchen, New Jersey) announced they had just joined ACM. Southern PEG operations were severely curtailed as a result of new cable regulations in those states in the early 21st century.

In a re-organization of ACM affiliation rules in 2013, former ACM Chapters were given greater independence and invited to continue to participate in the ACM through Affiliate membership, which was created to give like-minded groups such as Mass Access a path to collaboration with the ACM on issues of mutual interest.

Within the ACM, the Caucus of Inclusion, Equity and Engagement takes responsibility for research and recommendations on collaborating with communities that are underserved by mainstream media.

== Advocacy ==
From its founding, the ACM has been primarily focused on the needs of Public, Educational, and Governmental (PEG) access stations and the regulatory environment fostering their existence. The NFLCP and George Stoney's cohort were instrumental in getting a legal basis for the public interest requirement written into the Cable Communications Policy Act of 1984. In 1996 the ACM was a petitioner in a U.S. Supreme Court decision involving the potential censorship of material that an operator "reasonably believes ... depicts sexual ... activities or organs in a patently offensive manner." In 2013 ACM published a summary of the implications for their members of the 2010 Southern New York district court decision in Viacom International Inc. v. YouTube, Inc..

The ACM has taken up a number of causes on behalf of the PEG community, including:

- Protection of funding sources at the national, state and local levels
- Defending the PEG industry against efforts to reduce its effectiveness
- Promoting training and best practices within the PEG community
- Helping community media centers prepare for future technologies

The ACM staff, with assistance from ACM's Policy Working Group helps the PEG community identify potential threats and solutions to the policy discussions that would affect their ability to operate.

The ACM also works to raise awareness among policymakers of the importance of local media literacy and access.

== Activities ==
ACM members have the opportunity to learn and network at the ACM national conference every year, as well as ACM regional conferences. These conferences typically include a tradeshow, educational seminars, and a video contest. At the national level, the Hometown Awards began in the early days of the NFLCP, and typically attracts hundreds of entries, including locally produced shows, public service announcements, sporting events, and community highlights.

In addition, the ACM publishes a newsletter about developments in the community media field. Originally entitled “Community Television Review” the newsletter was later renamed “Community Media Review”, and eventually moved to an online emailed format.

The ACM conducts educational programs for its members, including training webinars, policy conference calls, calls to action, and a mentorship program.

National Conferences
Year	Location	Dates	Theme
2024	San Jose, CA	6/25-27	
2023	Brooklyn, NY	6/27-29	B Transformed for Good
2022	Chicago, IL	6/28-30	Sweet Home
2021	virtual	6/29-7/1	Sharing & Building Resilience
2020	canceled		
2019	Portland, OR	7/10-12	New Paths
2018	Baltimore, MD	7/11-13	Be More
2017	Minneapolis, MN	7/12-14	Rivers To Cross
2016	Boston, MA	8/18-20	Our Town
2015	Pasadena, CA	8/12-14	ReDiscover Community Media
2014	Philadelphia, PA	8/6-8	State & Main [joint conference with NAMAC]
2013	San Francisco, CA	5/29-31	Transformation
2012	Chicago, IL	7/31-8/2	Collaborate
2011	Tucson, AZ	7/27-30	Innovate
2010	Pittsburgh, PA	7/7-10	Meeting Community Media Challenges
2009	Portland, OR	7/15-18	Community Media at the Crossroads
2008	Washington, DC	7/9-12	gO/sz
2007	Minneapolis, MN	7/25-28	Navigating the Currents of Change in Community Media
2006	Boston, MA	7/5-8	Connecting Communities
2005	Monterey, CA	7/6-9	Waves of Change
2004	Tampa, FL	7/7-10	Channels for Change
2003	Tacoma, WA	7/9-12	Connecting Media, Cultures & Communities
2002	Houston, TX	7/10-13	Celebrate Diversity
2001	Washington, DC	7/11-14	Building Community Through Media
2000	Tucson, AZ	7/12-15	
1999	Cincinnati, OH	7/7-10	Building Bridges To Each Other In The Next Century
1998	Portland, OR	7/8-11	Community Media: From Vision to Action
1997	Milwaukee, WI	7/9-12	
1996	Arlington, VA	7/17-20	We the People: Building Community Through Media
1995	Boston, MA	7/5-8	Community Media: Thriving in the Technology Revolution
1994	Honolulu, HI	7/20-23	Protect the Voice, Perpetuate the Vision
1993	Atlanta, GA	7/21-25	Cultural Diversity: Weaving Common Threads
1992	St. Paul, MN	7/15-19	Telling Our Stories: One Drum, Many Drummers
1991	Portland, OR	7/24-28	Voices of Democracy: Celebrating the First Amendment
1990	Washington, DC	7/25-29	Advocate
1989	Dallas, TX	7/13-15	The Video Frontier
1988	Tampa, FL	7/14-16	Channels for Change
1987	Chicago, IL	7/16-18	
1986	San Francisco, CA	7/10-12	
1985	Boston, MA	7/11-13	
1984	Denver, CO	7/19-21	
1983	Portland, OR		
1982	St. Paul, MN	7/8-11	
1981	Atlanta, GA	7/9-12	
1980	East Lansing, MI	6/25-29	
1979	Austin, TX		
1978	Madison, WI	7/6-9	

== See also ==
- Public, educational, and government access
- Public-access television
- Community Media Association (UK)
- World Association of Community Radio Broadcasters (Worldwide)
- Alliance Community Radio Austria (Austria)
- Alliance Community Television Austria (Austria)
