= Alliance of Community Television Austria =

The Alliance of Community Television Austria (German: Verband Community Fernsehen Österreich or VCFÖ) is the alliance and lobbying group of non-commercial community television stations in Austria. The VCFÖ was established in 2010 as an association and has three members. The acceptance of the "Charta Community Television Austria" is mandatory for the membership.

The VCFÖ is affiliated to the Alliance Community Radio Austria, the Community Media Forum Europe and the World Association of Community Radio Broadcasters.

== Members ==
Full members are:

- dorf (Linz)
- FS1 (Salzburg)
- Okto (Vienna)

== See also ==
- Alliance for Community Media (United States)
- Community Media Association (UK)
