= Erik Hugh Davis =

American broadcaster

- Born: December 1, 1970 (age 55); Orange, California, U.S.
- Citizenship: American
- Education: San Diego State University
- Occupation: Broadcast media executive
- Years active: 1995 - present

Erik Hugh Davis (born December 1, 1970) is an American media professional and broadcast executive. He has served as the executive director of the nonprofit community access television organization TV Santa Barbara (TVSB) since 2017. He was also El Presidente of Santa Barbara's Old Spanish Days Fiesta in 2020.

== Early life and education ==
Davis was born in Orange, California, and raised in the Santa Barbara area. He attended Foothill Elementary School, La Colina Junior High School, and San Marcos High School. In 1989, he moved to San Diego to attend San Diego State University, where he earned a degree in broadcast journalism and political science.

== Career ==
Davis began his broadcasting career in 1995 as a news writer and environmental reporter for KUSI-TV in San Diego. He later returned to Santa Barbara to work at the Pacifica Graduate Institute, serving as director of institutional advancement, marketing, and public relations from 2003 until 2017.

He took over as executive director of TV Santa Barbara in November 2017. The station operates community access channels 17 and 71 in the Santa Barbara area. During his tenure, TVSB hosted the West Region conference of the Alliance for Community Media in 2023. The station also won four Telly Awards in 2021, including a Gold Telly for its Make Goleta Count! census campaign produced alongside the city of Goleta, California.

Davis has hosted various local programming, including the cultural series 805 Inspires!, and has been a frequent broadcaster for the Santa Barbara Summer Solstice Parade. He was chosen as the Summer Solstice Celebration King in 2023.

== Community involvement ==
Davis has held multiple leadership positions with Old Spanish Days Fiesta. He served as external relations division chief, second vice president, and first vice president before being named El Presidente for the 2020 festival season. He continues to serve on the organization's board as a past president director.

From 2014 to 2018, he was the vice president of the Pearl Chase Society, a local historic preservation group.
