= Cable television franchise fee =

Government fee for private services

In the United States cable television industry, a cable television franchise fee is an annual fee charged by a local government to a private cable television company as compensation for using public property it owns as right-of-way for its cable. In the US, cable television services are provided by private for-profit companies, cable television providers, which sign a franchise agreement with cities and counties to provide cable television to its residents. The franchise fee is set during initial negotiation of the franchise agreement, usually by a process in which the government requests bids from cable providers to serve their community. This fee can be renegotiated when the franchise agreement comes up for renewal, usually at intervals of 10 to 12 years. Although it is paid to a government, it is not a tax.

Franchise fees are governed under Section 622 of the Cable Communications Act of 1984. Section 622, states that municipalities are entitled to a maximum of 5% of gross revenues derived from the operation of the cable system for the provision of cable services such as Public, educational, and government access (PEG) TV channels.

== Controversy ==
Section 542(f) of the Communications Act says "A cable operator may designate that portion of a subscriber's bill attributable to the franchise fee as a separate item on the bill." Most cable providers choose to list this item on customer's bills, so every customer will see it each time they pay their bill. This fee has become a source of contention and controversy, since how franchise fees are characterized and billed can have a profound effect on public attitudes toward cable television.

Local governments generally would prefer this item not be listed on the bill. Since the fee is paid to the government, when it is broken down on a per-customer basis on the bill it appears to be a tax on the customer, possibly igniting antipathy against government officials. If it just appeared on accounting statements as a lump sum payment by the cable provider, it would be perceived by the public more as a fee-for-service, which is how governments tend to regard it. However, the Communications Act provides the transparency of the franchise fee so that customers of the cable company understand the fee imposed by the government upon the cable company.

Cable providers, in contrast, see the fee as a cost of doing business which they are passing along to the customer. By listing on their bill the portion attributable to the fee, customers may feel that government is responsible for that portion, not the cable provider. Also, since customers will notice any increase in the fee, and may interpret it as a "tax increase", listing it on the bill may discourage governments from pushing for an increase in the fee when the franchise agreement is renewed.

Justifications or rationales for the franchise fee fall into six basic categories:

- Revenue - a source of general revenue for the government which can be raised without raising taxes.
- Rent - rent for the use of public land as right-of-way by the company for its cables.
- Exclusivity - compensation to the government for allowing the cable operator to maintain a de facto monopoly on cable service in the area.
- Diversity - it is in the public interest to fund government facilities providing public, educational, and government access (PEG) channels that promote diversity in the community.
- Benefit - compensation for the public relations benefits the cable provider gains by having public, educational, and governmental channels on the cable.
- Regulatory - compensation to the government for the cost of regulating cable television: consultants, auditors, administrators, and inspectors.
