= Queens Public Television =

- Country: United States
- Broadcast area: Queens, New York City

Programming
- Language: English
- Picture format: 480i (SDTV)

Ownership
- Owner: Queens Public Communications Corporation

Links
- Website: Queens Public Television

Queens Public Television (QPTV) is a public-access television network serving the residents of the borough of Queens, New York City. It is operated by the Queens Public Communications Corporation (QPCC), a non-profit organization which manages the four public, educational, and government access (PEG) channels (Channels 34/1995, 56/1996, 57/1997, 79/1998 on Charter Spectrum; 35, 56, 1995, 1996, 1997, 1998. on RCN; and 34, 35, 36, 37 on Verizon Fios) on the cable TV systems for NY, Jamaica.

== QPTV original programming ==
- Adventures in QPTV Land (2001)
- American Vocal Ensemble (1999)
- Art a-la-Carte (1989)
- The Art of Paper Cutting (1997)
- Artists at Work (1992)
- Assembly Update (1997)
- The Beatnik Poets (2001)
- Ben's Music and Dance (1997)
- Bernie's Place (2006–present)
- Binat Chaim School of Music (1995)
- Business Goals 2000 (1996)
- Caribbean Classroom
- Caribbean Gospel Showcase (1997–1999)
- Center Stage
- Coaches Roundtable (1997)
- Companion Animal Network (1996–present)
- Computer Animation Discussion (1994)
- Connection Zone
- Conversations (1998)
- Creative Insight (1999)
- Creative Instincts (1998)
- Democracy in Crisis (1996–present)
- De Aqui y De Alla con Natty Abreu
- DeVore Dance Center in Concert 1997 (1998)
- The E.O.M. Rap Show (2000)
- Exploration of the Universe (1997)
- Eye Positive (1998)
- Eyewitness Ministries' Time With a Band (1998)
- Fitness World (1998)
- From the Heart (1996)
- The Game Show Block Party (2007–present)
- Garbage Band 101 (1991)
- The Gillis & Barry Show (1996–present)
- A Hidden Feud (1995)
- The Hive (1997-1998)
- In Our World
- An Interview with Joe
- Islam, the Universal System (1998–2000)
- Ivanka's 1-800 Contest (1998)
- James the Magician (1995)
- The Jennifer Vanilla Hour (2017–present)
- Joan's World
- The Joe Show (1999–2000)
- Keepin'(g) It Real (1997 and 1998)
- Kids (2) (2000–2001)
- Kids Will Be Kids (1999)
- The Learning Tree Multicultural School (2000)
- Life in the Universe (2000)
- Lipsynch Party (2) (1997–1999)
- The Lou Telano Show (2000)
- The Men of Fitness (1997)
- Mind Gym (1999)
- Mindlight
- Mrs. Jellybean (1995)
- Music Festival (1998)
- Music Movies & More (1998)
- Nosotros, Ustedes y... Luz Estella (1998)
- Not by Bread Alone
- Nueva York: Ciudad de Todos (1997)
- O's Crib
- The On Da Money Show
- The Panorama of New York City (1998)
- Passport to the World (2000–2001)
- Pets Alive (1996)
- Planet Safari U.S.A. (1996)
- Poetry in Gospel (1999)
- Pohl Position (1999–present)
- Public Access in Queens (1999)
- Queens Music Television (1999)
- Quiet Time and Praise the Lord (1997)
- Quinteto Brasileiro (1999)
- The Realm of Never
- Rhythmic Poetry (1999)
- Richie's Place
- Simple Science
- Skate Time (1998)
- Social Security & You
- Solutions (1998–present)
- Survivor (1997)
- Taekwon-Do (1997)
- Tete-A-Tete: The Independent Music Scene (1990)
- The Typewriter (2000)
- Urban Souls Culture
- The Way (1994)
- What's Happening Berverly?
- What Makes The Monkey Dance (2005)
- Where We Stand
- Women of Fitness (1997)
- Words (1997)
- You Name That Show (1999–present)
- A Young Artist Sculpts
