= WSTO TV =

Television station in Stoughton, Wisconsin

WSTO TV is Stoughton, Wisconsin's community television station. One of the first Public, educational, and government access (PEG) community channels, started in 1968 by Bob and Janeen Burrel. WSTO was originally called Viking Media Corp, until becoming WSTO in the early 1970s. WSTO is currently being broadcast on Charter Communications digital channel 981, TDS Telecom HD Channel 981, Roku, AppleTV, Amazon Fire TV, Android, iOS Apps and streaming 24/7 with most shows on-demand. In recent times WSTO was broadcast on Charter Communications Channel 12. WSTO has 1 dedicated full-time staff person and is operated by the City of Stoughton Information Technology and Media Services department for Stoughton, Wisconsin and is located on the 2nd floor of the Public Safety Building. In addition to WSTO TV, The City of Stoughton IT/Media Services Department also operates the Stoughton Information Network on Spectrum Channel 980 and TDS Telcom HD Channel 980.

== WSTO Broadcasts ==
WSTO broadcasts 24 hours a day 7 day a week in High Definition on TDS Channel 981 or in Standard Definition on Spectrum Channel 981. WSTO airs Elementary, Middle School and High School Music Performances, community music events, City Meetings, and various other local events. WSTO has received many awards from Wisconsin Community Media for the coverage of many of these events. In between each show on WSTO there are Public Service Announcements, station IDs, Commercials and the community bulletin board.

== Equipment ==
WSTO TV broadcast 24 hours a day 7 days a week using an automation system from TelVue. The automation system consists of a Hypercaster AIO-B2000-12 Video Server, a carousel channel, TelVue Telecast 2 for online and App viewing, Blonder Tongue Encoders for TDS and analog modulators for broadcast on Spectrum Television

WSTO TV operates a complete HD remote production box with live-to-air and live-to-file capabilities with live on screen graphics.

Additionally WSTO has a permanent control room inside the WSTO Station, used for in studio shows and events in the council chambers/court room. Additionally there is a complete control booth at the Stoughton EMS Building which is used for council meeting or special recordings in the Hanson Room.

WSTO uses state of the art professional video cameras for remote shoots. Our fleet of cameras consists of three Canon XF705 cameras and three Canon XF605 Cameras.

WSTO has non-linear edit suites with Adobe Creative Suite

Those looking to visit the WSTO Station can contact them at 608-873-7523.
