= Community Media Association =

The Community Media Association (CMA) is the UK membership association for community broadcasting. Founded in 1983 as the Community Radio Association, the name of the organisation was changed in 1997 to the Community Media Association (CMA) to reflect the growing convergence of digital communications. The CMA is a non-profit making organisation, supporting Community Radio and Television and community-based Internet projects. Its mission is to enable people to establish and develop communications media for cultural and creative expression, community development and entertainment.

The CMA defines community media projects as, "a third tier of not-for profit broadcasters, owned and run by local people, mostly volunteers, which enable communities throughout the UK to use media to create new opportunities for regeneration, employment, learning, social cohesion and inclusion as well as cultural and creative expression."

The CMA represents community media to Government, industry and regulatory bodies such as Ofcom. Membership brings together established organisations, aspirant groups and individuals within the sector. The CMA provides a range of advice, information and consultancy, offering support to anyone with an interest in community-based broadcasting.

Much of the CMA's work has a strategic emphasis and in 2004 the organisation was heavily involved in liaison with Government regarding actual and proposed legislation on community radio, public service broadcasting, BBC Charter Review, local and community television, the Broadcasting Code, media literacy, digital switchover, the Community Radio Fund, and spectrum allocation.

The CMA's head office is located in London and the CMA is affiliated to the World Association of Community Radio Broadcasters.

== See also ==
- Alliance for Community Media (United States)
- Alliance Community Radio Austria (Austria)
- Alliance Community Television Austria (Austria)
