= Radiofabrik =

Coordinates: 47.794173°N 13.055963°E

Salzburg (Austria); Austria
- Broadcast area: Salzburg (state), Berchtesgadener Land, Traunstein
- Frequencies: analog terrestrial 107.5 and 97.3 FM, cable 98.6 Fm, livestream

Programming
- Languages: German, English, French, Spanish, Turkish, Serbo-Croatian (BCS), Russian, Farsi
- Format: Community Radio
- Affiliations: FS1

Ownership
- Owner: Association "Freier Rundfunk Salzburg"

History
- First air date: 1998

Links
- Webcast: http://www.radiofabrik.at/rafab_stream_low.m3u
- Website: http://www.radiofabrik.at

Radiofabrik is Salzburg’s community radio. It is an independent, non-commercial, non-profit radio station in Salzburg, Austria.

== History ==
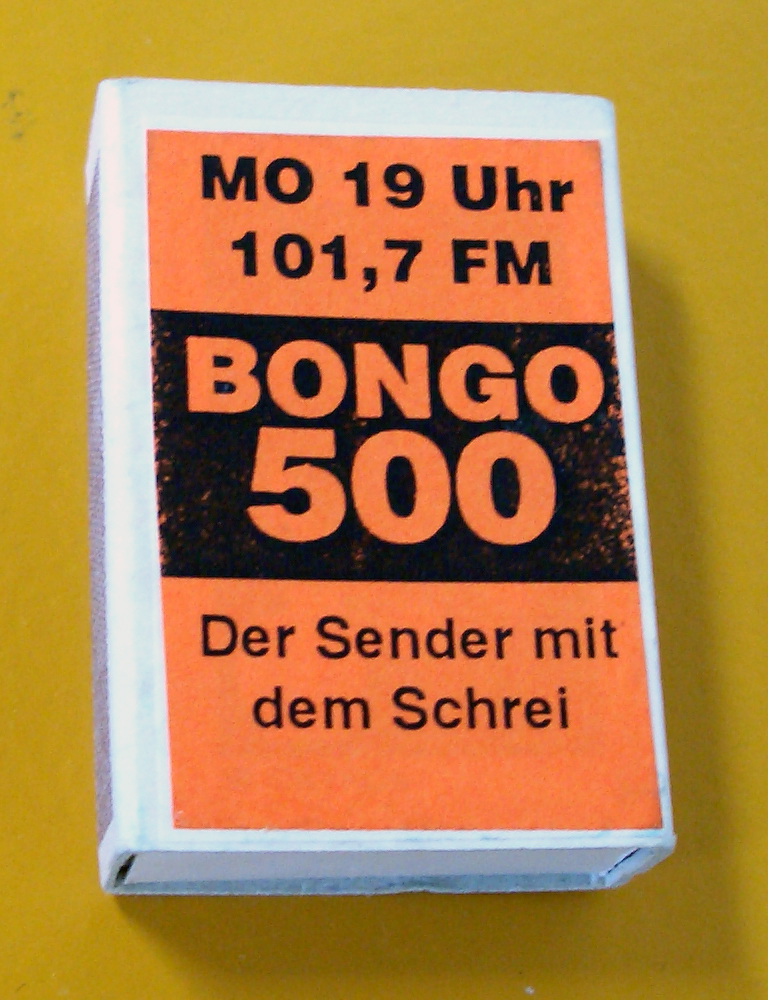
Matchbox with an ad of „Pirateradio Bongo 500“, from 1992

Some of the founders of Radiofabrik (for example Wolfgang Hirner, who later became CEO of the Radiofabrik) started their illegal radio station as early as 1992, when the state-monopoly on broadcasting was still in force. The pirate radio was called «Radio Bongo 500».

The license was obtained in 1998, (five years after the state-monopoly was abolished,) and Radiofabrik became the second Community Radio in Austria to broadcast legally (Radio Helsinki started broadcasting from Graz as early as 1995). At the beginning Radiofabrik had a five-hours weekly slot on the commercial radio station «Radio Arabella».

Daily broadcasting started in January 2002, once again sharing the waves of a commercial station (City Radio). After the bankruptcy of «Objektwerbung GmbH» (owner of City Radio) in October 2003 Radiofabrik obtained the full broadcast licence and has been on air 24/7 ever since.

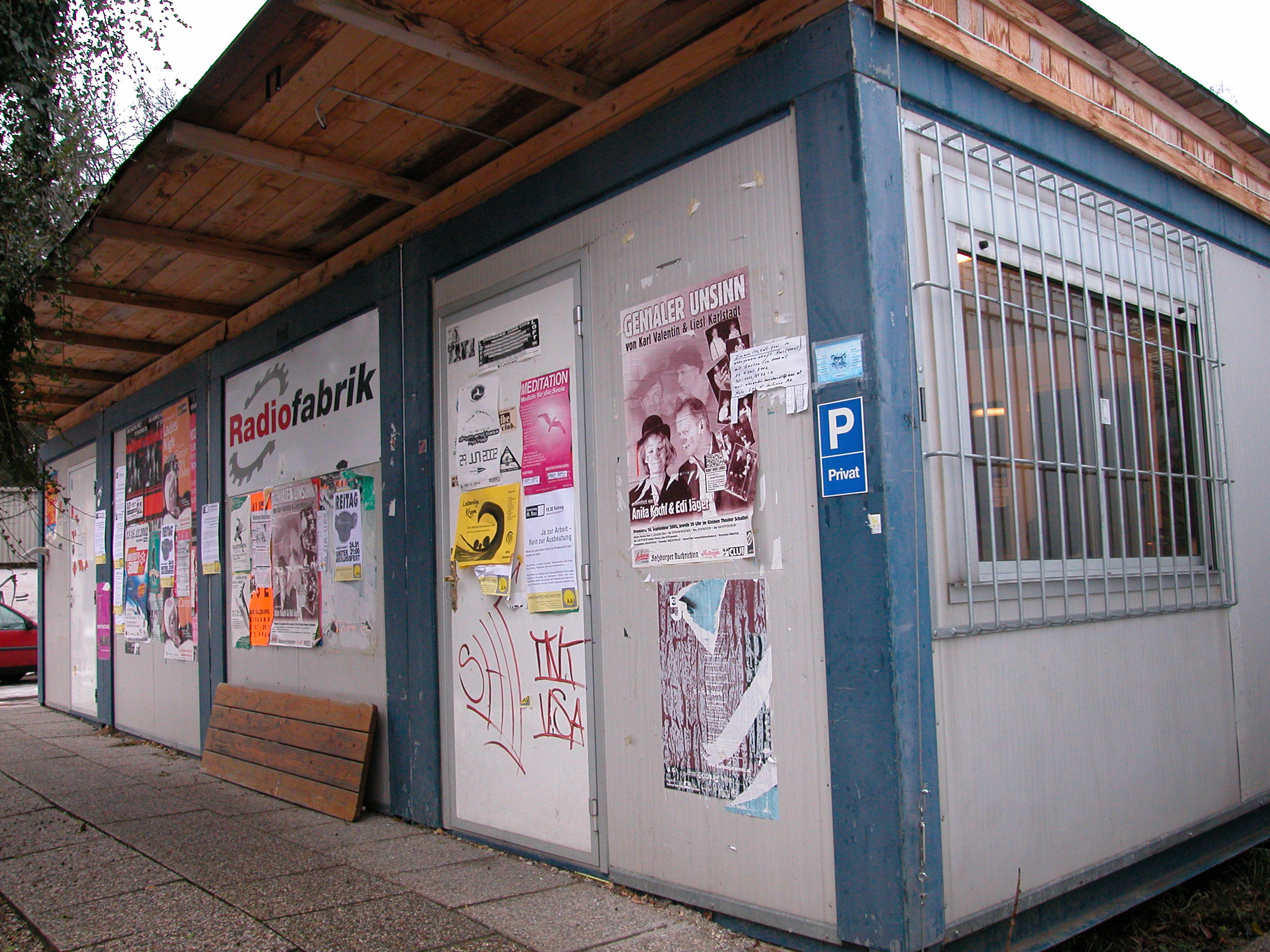
Studio of Radiofabrik in containers, until 2005

In the early days the studio was located in a prefabricated container. In 2005 Radiofabrik headquarters were relocated inside the ARGE-Kultur Salzburg, a self-standing cultural centre, where professional infrastructure and equipment (office, studio, production and workshop rooms) were set up. The Radiofabrik community never stopped growing.

In 2014, 300 volunteers are producing a huge variety of radio shows in 14 different languages. From children to elder people, from homeless to professors, from classical music to heavy metal, from politics to trash you can hear almost anything on Radiofabrik – except commercials.

In February 2009, radiofabrik started campaigning for (license-) fee splitting in the state of salzburg.

In 2011, KommAustria prolonged the stations broadcasting license for another 10 years (until 2021).

In 2012, the Community TV FS1 was founded.

In July 2015, the first external studio in Bad Reichenhall opened.

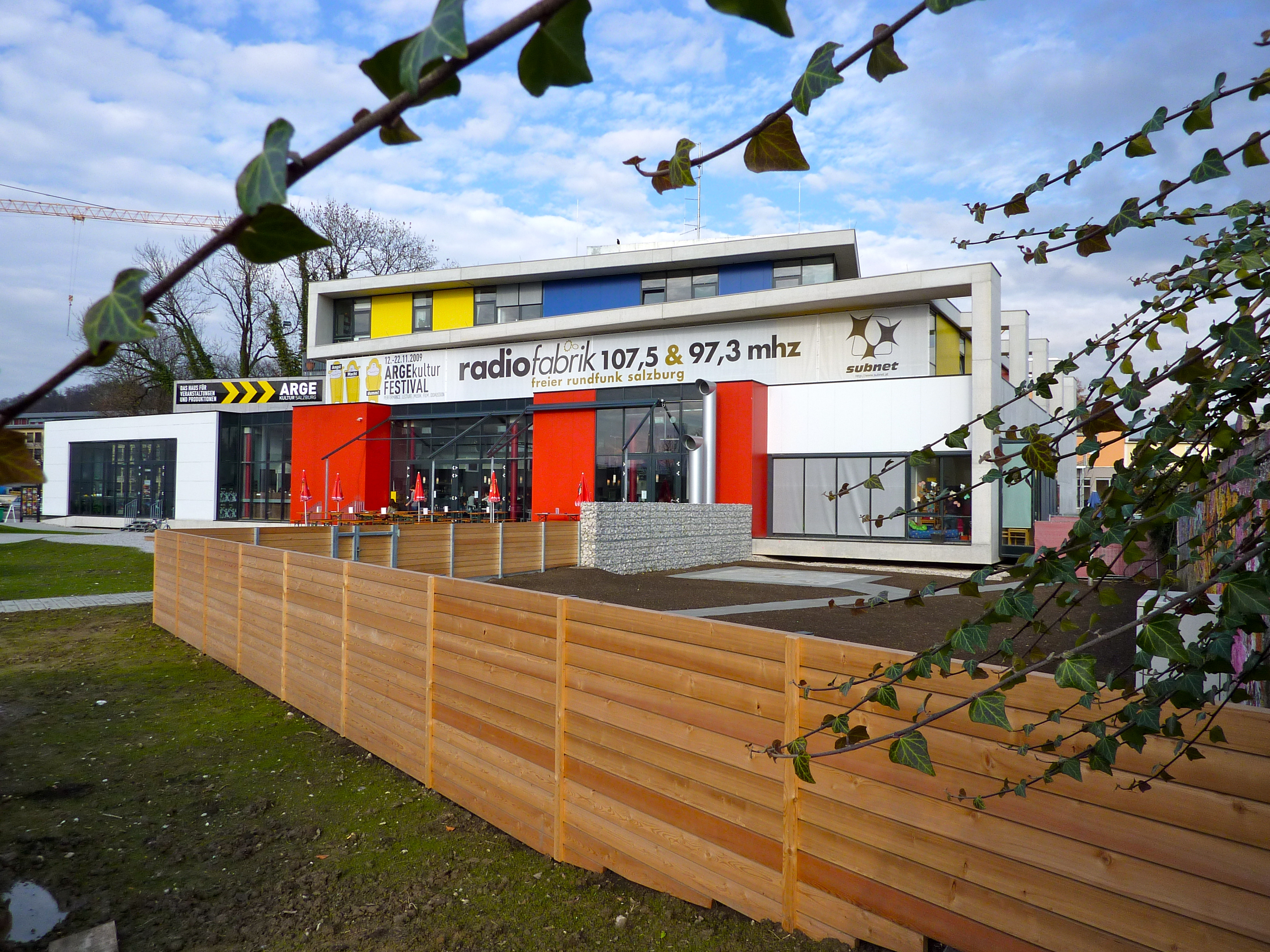
The studio of Radiofabrik in 1st floor of ARGEkultur, roof antenna for frequence 97,3 MHz

== Programme and concept ==
As a non-commercial, independent Community Radio Radiofabrik is intended for everyone, individuals and groups, especially for those, who tend to be underrepresented in both private and public media. Therefore, there are programmes produced by and for people senior 50, a special programme produced by youth for people under 18, and also programmes in more than 10 different languages. Radiofabrik is the broadcasting service with the largest diversity of opinion in Salzburg.

Programmes are shared via the internet-platform of Austrias free radios.

Everyone who wants to create his own radio programme can become a community member and has to pass a workshop, in which media law, technical skills and basic journalistic skills are taught. The person in charge of his own programme is free to choose topic and content of his or her broadcast. There is definitely no space for programmes with racist, sexist, pro-violent or anti-democratic content as well as religious propaganda.

The journalist Georg Wimmer, who has won several journalistic awards, was responsible for the coordination of the programme. In January 2009 project manager Eva Schmidhuber took on the programme administration.

=== Professional editorial staff ===
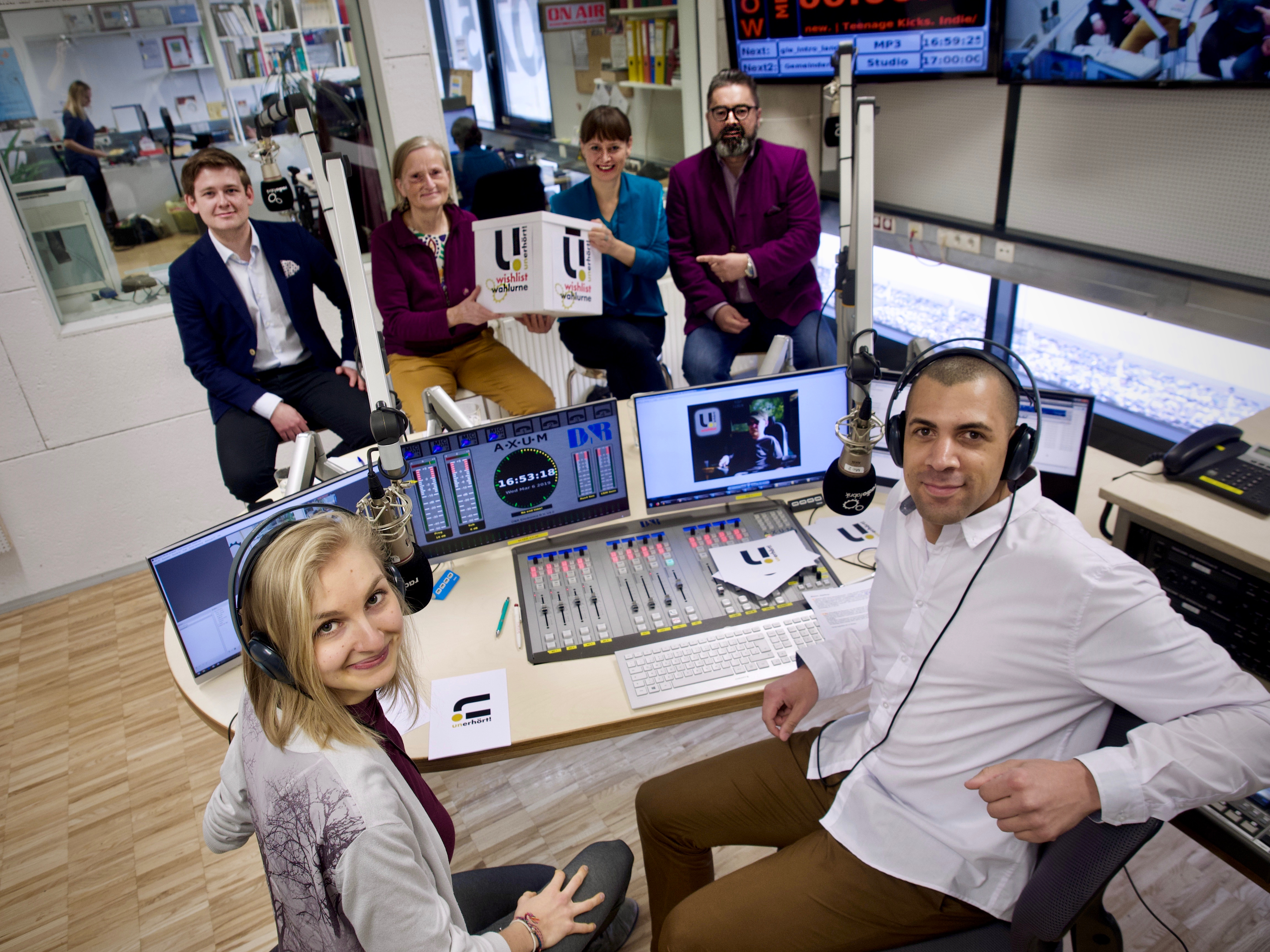
Studio discussion on the Salzburg municipal council election - Timna Pachner, Daniel Bergerweiss - unerhört! editors (2019)

Since its creation, the broadcaster has run semi-professional newsrooms. For the show "Magazin um 5", an employed chief editor engaged an additional team of editorial interns. This show was broadcast several times a week and was discontinued in 2015 for financial reasons. With the support of the city of Salzburg, a course of journalistic basics for radio editors was launched in autumn 2018. The so-called "Lehrredaktion" annually trains a group of volunteers in journalism. Upon the successful completion of the course, they can participate in production of the regional news for the local newsroom unerhört! - der Infonahversorger.

Another professional editorial team is responsible for music selection and self-produced music programs for the broadcaster.

== Education ==
The radio has developed extensive media education training courses and workshops. According to their own statements, they offer the largest range of courses and workshops among all non-commercial broadcasters in Austria. The subjects vary from moderation training, audio editing and promotion to journalism courses. More than 1,400 people completed the courses in 2019 at Radiofabrik.

== Organization ==
Until 2009 the organization of Radiofabrik was based on two pillars: The „Verein Freier Rundfunk Salzburg“ is a registered association, in which all programme creators and supporters are members on institutional level. The association is responsible for the broadcasting service. The association owned a corporation in charge of the infrastructure (Sendeanlagen GesmbH), who also did hold the broadcasting licence. In 2009 the corporation was abandoned, infrastructure and license both went to the association.

The board of management consists of teacher and journalist Oliver Baumann (chairman of the association), scientists Su Karrer and Eva-Maria Kubin (both University of Salzburg), Radiofabrik founder Wolfgang Hirner and management-consultant Wolfgang Stöger.

Until 2007 Radiofabrik was managed by founder Wolfgang Hirner. Adult educator Andreas Wagner was CEO from 2007 forward. In March 2008 media artist and media manager Alf Altendorf became CEO of Radiofabrik, since January 2018 together with Eva Schmidhuber as director of program.

=== Funding ===
Operation of the radiostation is covered by state-level, city-level and other grants, as well as self-generated revenue.

== Project work ==
Radiofabrik's local connection to NGOs and cultural sites in Salzburg is as vital for the programme of Radiofabrik as the orientation towards the European Union, which culminates in participating in many projects initiated by the EU.

The significance of activities in the field of media-related education has increased. One example was the Interreg-IIIA-Project "EuRegio Medienzentrum" (2006 - 2009), where the “Aktion Film Salzburg” and the District Office of Traunstein were involved.

=== Projects ===
- Check your Choice und Check Europe (2014, by order of the European Parliament)
- EU-Project Addicted 2 Random (2011 - 2013)
- EU-Project Hörstolpersteine (2012)
- EU-Project Ohrenblicke (2009 - 2011)
- EU-Project Ein Hörmahnmal - a Sonic Memorial (2009 - 2010)
- EU-Project Civilmedia (annual convention since 2006)
- EU-Project Radiodialogues – voices of diversity (2008 - 2009)
- EU-Project Talk About It (2007 - 2008)
- EU-Project Let's Talk About Science (2007)
- EU-Project I Speak Football (2008)
- Euregio-Project EuRegio Media Center (EMZ) (2006 - 2009)
- EuRegio Children's Radio – Radio of, for and with children
- belle of the ball – project “Rasende Reporterin” at EURO2008
- mozartRemixed (2006)

== Technic ==
Radiofabrik develops hardware and software for the editorial board of radio stations. In 2005 IT-engineer Hermann Huber presented the Radio Automation Software YARM (Yet Another Radio Manager) at the Ars Electronica. Many Austrian community radios did use YARM. In 2014 development was discontinued.

Radiofabriks terrestrial reach amounts to 425.000 residents.

Broadcast sites include the ARGEKULTUR-building in Salzburg (97,3 FM), from 2002 onwards Maria Plain (107,5 FM), until the new antenna in 2013 was moved to the Hochgitzen in Bergheim to extend the main frequency's reach. It was named “ada” after British mathematician and programmer Ada Lovelace (1815–1852).

=== Broadcast area ===
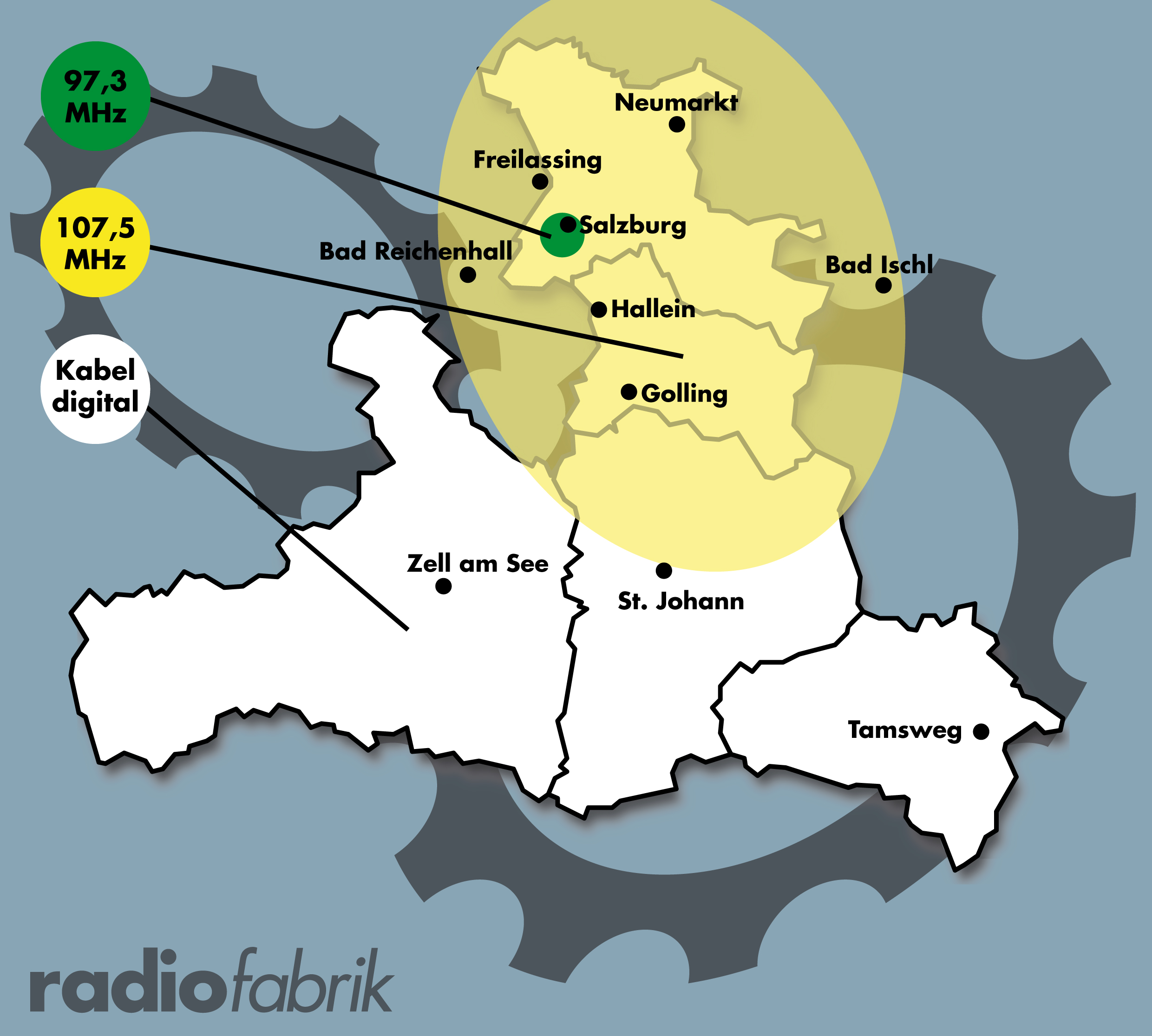
Radiofabrik - Broadcast area (2014)

The Radiofabrik broadcasts over FM 107,5 and 97,3 MHz (City of Salzburg, Flachgau, Tennengau, Berchtesgadener Land, Traunstein), via analogue and digital cable in the whole state of Salzburg and via Internet live stream.

=== External studios ===
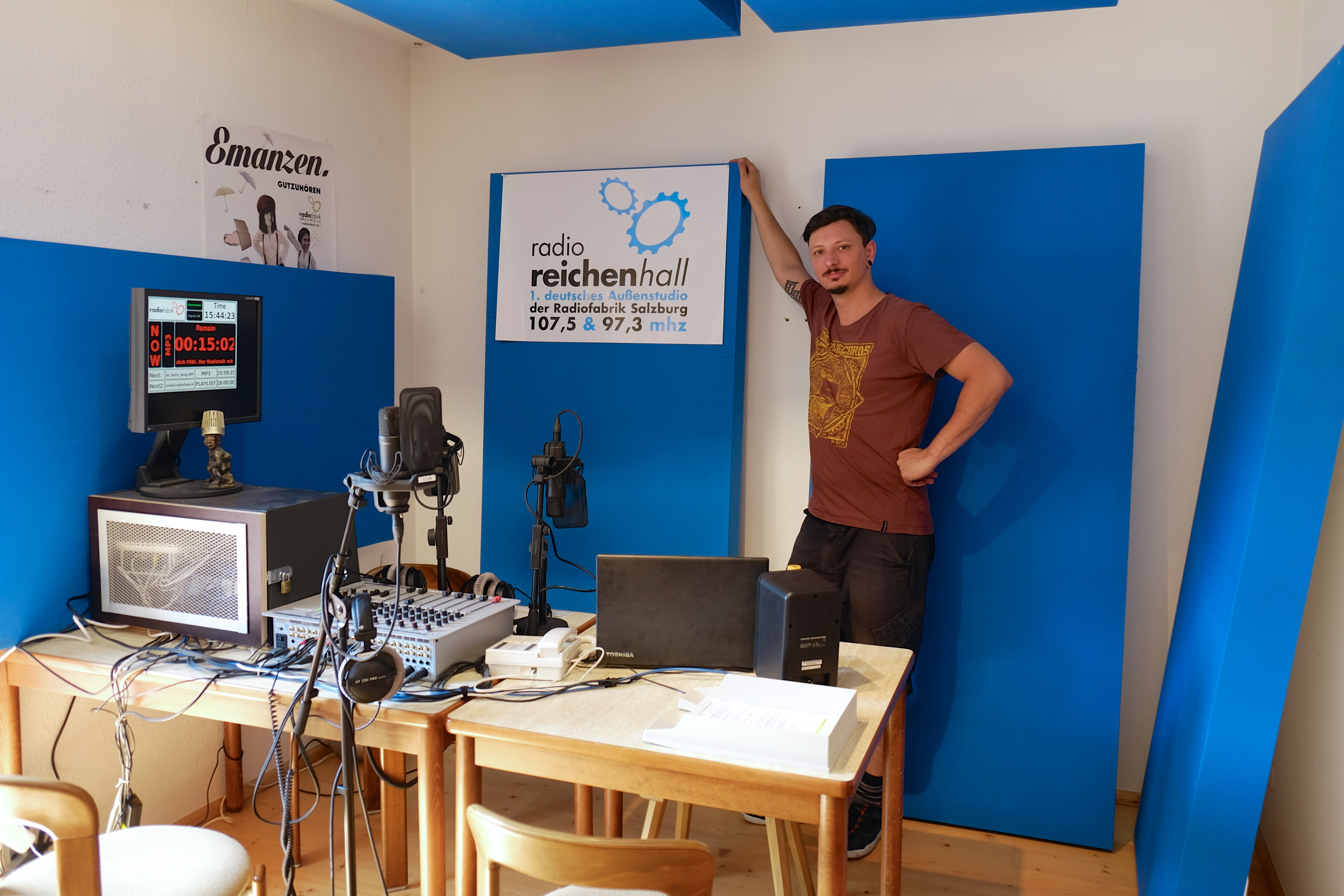
External Studio Radio Reichenhall - Studio (2015)

In July 2015 Radiofabrik opened its first external studio in Bad Reichenhall (Germany).

== Partnerships ==
Radiofabrik 107,5 is a member of the Alliance Community Radio Austria (Verband Freier Radios Österreich – VFRÖ) and of the umbrella organization of Salzburg's cultural sites (Dachverband Salzburger Kulturstätten). The association is founder and holds a 24% share of the community television FS1.

Radiofabrik is officially partnered with BBC world service and broadcasts English news 8 times a day between 1 AM and 7 PM.

Another partner is US-based magazine Democracy Now.

== Awards ==
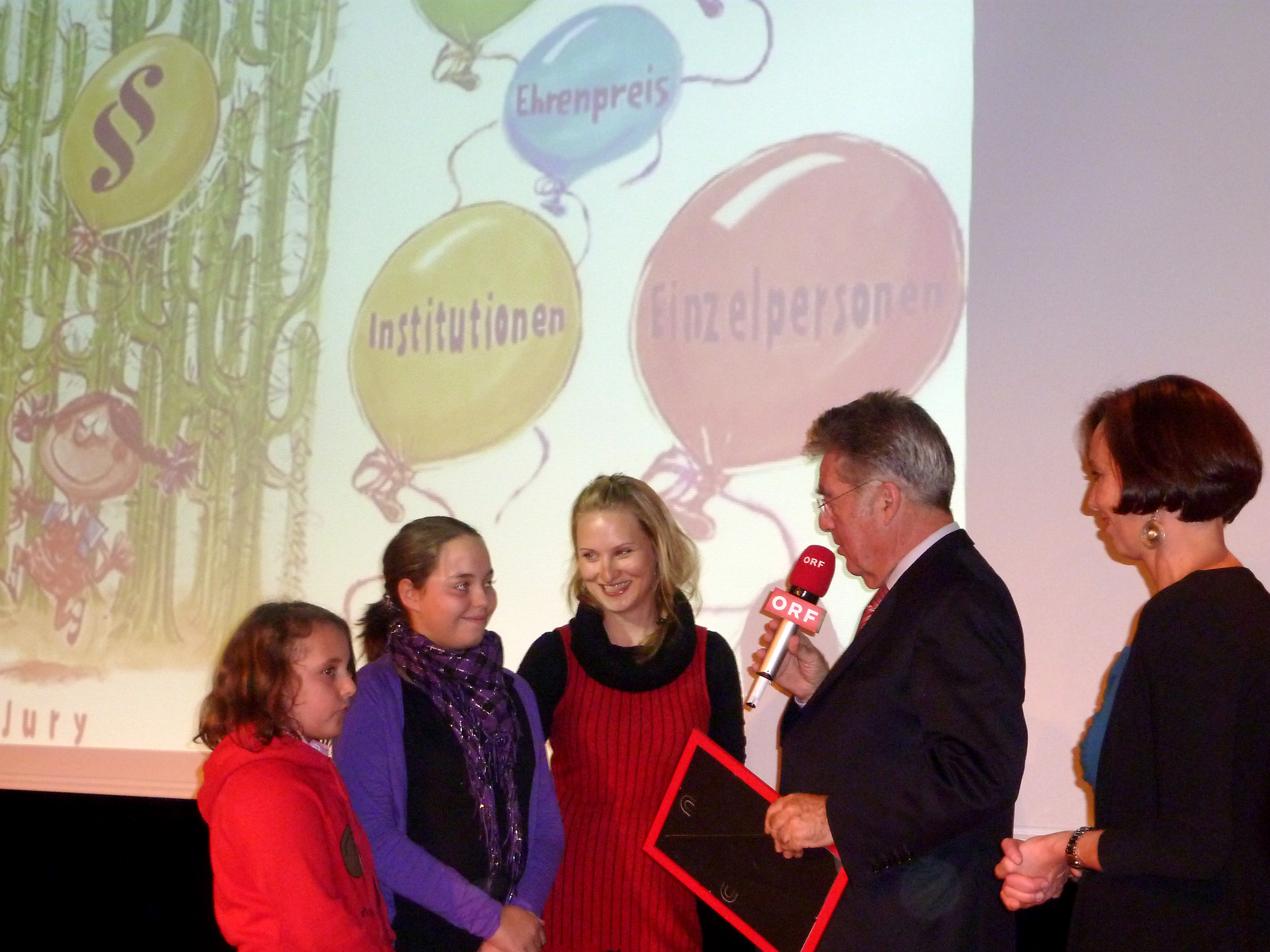
President of Austria Heinz Fischer hands over Kids Right Prize to Radiofabrik (2011)

Radiofabrik received i.a. the following awards:

- Cultural award for integration and human rights (“Kulturpreis für Integration und Menschenrechte“) endowed by the Green Party of Salzburg and Gerard Mortier, 2003)
- Cultural Award of the federal state of Salzburg (Kulturpreis des Landes Salzburg, 2003)
- Radio Award of adult education (2007, 2008, 2009, 2010, 2011, 2012, 2013, 2014)
- Alternative Media Award of Media academy Nürnberg and Friedrich Ebert Foundation (FES), (2008)
- Media award of the German organisation Kindernothilfe (2008)
- ESIS – Seal for innovative multilingual projects (2003, 2008)
- Top 100 people of Salzburg 2003, 2004 & 2008 (2003–26. Wolfgang Hirner/Georg Wimmer, 2004–34.- Hermann Huber, 2008–17.-Alf Altendorf/Georg Wimmer)

„Radio Schorsch“

Starting in 2008, every year radiofabrik awards programs/program-creators/staff with their own price (Radioschorsch), named after the first broadcast site of „Radio Bongo“ (see History).

Previous winners were:

- 2008: Artarium – Das etwas andere Kunnstbiotop / Rosi Gabriel (Honorary Award)
- 2009: Squirrelkids
- 2010: Sabaha Sinanovic
- 2011: Edith Schiller / Marcus Diess (Lifetime Achievement)
- 2013: Hallo Nachbarland (“networking and community building”), Radio Stachelschwein (“Social Vision and realization”), Soundburg-Radio ("technological pioneers work"), Georg Wimmer (Lifetime Achievement)
- 2015: Stoned Poets (culture), Menschen in Aktion (social policy)
- 2016: Battle & Hum, Skrupellose Fische (entertaining knowledge transfer)
