= Local franchise authority =

A local franchise authority (LFA) is a United States local government organization that, together with the Federal Communications Commission (FCC), regulates cable television service within the local government's area. In some cases the LFA is the state, while in others it might be a city, county, or municipality. The LFA is meant to address cable problems such as service related rates and charges, tier rates, customer service problems, franchise fees, signal quality, and the use of public, educational, and governmental (PEG) channels. When experiencing a problem with your cable television you should first contact the cable company itself, then the local franchise authorities, then the National Citizens Committee for Broadcasting, and finally the chairmen of the House and Senate subcommittees who oversee the FCC. Additional help can be found on the web page of the Federal Communications Commission.

== History ==
The development of the cable television system resulted in a complex system of regulations. Local, state, and federal laws overlapped and caused a variety of issues. Local franchise authorities were accused of having monopolies over the cable systems and creating issues through micromanagement. The complex local, state, and federal regulations have been a topic of discussion for many years. The general opinion seems to have been that the laws which regulate cable television, and the telecommunications industry in general, have been in need of deregulation. Experts boast a number of benefits which would result from this change. Experts began calling for deregulation of these rules as early as 1970s. The problem did not have a quick or easy solution and it was decades until action was taken.

In the 1980s Kiplinger’s Personal Finance published an article which alerted cable customers to their rights as consumers. The 1980s was a time when not all towns had cable television. Previously there had been instances where towns had become stuck in a contract with a bad cable provider. This could be prevented if the town took an active part when a cable company was interested in entering the community. By learning the FCC regulations and the governing entity of their local franchise company, customers had the ability to make demands for their cable agreement which helped to ensure fair service. In return for the rights to offer service in an area, a cable company must provide certain community benefits requested by the LFA. These might include Public, educational, and government access (PEG) cable TV channels, high-speed networks for local agencies and institutions, and/or special rates for seniors, the economically disadvantaged, and the disabled.

By the 1990s the demand for cable technology was so rapidly increasing that the need for reform seemed inevitable. Cable systems in the United States were becoming more of a necessity than a luxury both for individuals and communities as technology became a part of everyday life. By this time there were numerous publications which explored the problems with the cable system. Local franchise companies had control over cable systems which resulted in a sort of monopoly. The local authorities were accused of having priority to access (although there are rebuttals against the validity of this argument). One author made the comparison of allowing the government to only permit one newspaper to be sold on the side of the street; it would result in a lack of competition. This is what was happening in the cable industry, the local franchise authorities had the power to control which cable systems were granted access to their area. The high demand for cable systems suggested a guaranteed profitable business venture. However, the cost of funding to develop a cable system was high and the barriers to entry made it a greater risk than many investors were interested in taking. This resulted in lack of competition which resulted in higher prices.

In 1996 the long-awaited reform came about. The Telecommunications Act of 1996 became the largest and most comprehensive rewrite of telecommunication laws. It was meant to deregulate the system and create a more open market in which competitive prices and better service could be achieved. It granted local franchise authorities the ability to regulate cable service rates which was previously mandated by the FCC. However, the effectiveness of this act in accomplishing those feats has been debated. In the immediate aftermath new problems arose. Some had been predicted and some had not. The sheer number of overhauls caused roadways and sidewalks to be torn up which affected pedestrian and vehicular travel while adding extra expense to the endeavor. Local authorities could no longer dictate who could occupy their property nor how much they should be compensated for this occupancy. Companies were now fighting over who had the rights to physical access in communities. Also, two years later the FCC was still making rules and had, in fact, made more rules than many of the other governmental Departments combined.
