= Radio OP =

- Oberpullendorf; Austria
- Broadcast area: Oberpullendorf district
- Frequency: FM 98.8MHz

History
- First air date: 2009–2023
- Former call signs: Antenne 4

Links
- Webcast: 128kbps quality
- Website: http://www.radioop.at

Radio OP (short for Oberpullendorf) was a public radio station in Burgenland, Austria. The station broadcast on 98.8 MHz from the Oberpullendorf Grammar School. It could be received across Central Burgenland with programming in German, Hungarian, and Croatian. The station reported on news and events from across the Oberpullendorf District.

== Rebranding ==
Radio OP was rebranded and relaunched as Radio MORA (Multilingual Open Radio Association) in 2023. This rebrand reflected the station's goal to also provide a multilingual radio station for audiences in southern Burgenland, across multiple frequencies, in German, Croatian, Hungarian, and Romani languages. The station also broadcasts music from artists of all cultural groups in Burgenland such as Hungarians and Croats.
