= Cable Television Consumer Protection and Competition Act of 1992 =

United States federal law

- Long title: An act to amend the Communications Act of 1934 to provide increased consumer protection and to promote increased competition in the cable television and related markets, and for other purposes.
- Nicknames: 1992 Cable Act; Cable Television Protection and Competition Act
- Enacted by: the 102nd United States Congress
- Effective: October 8, 1992

Citations
- Public law: 102-385
- Statutes at Large: 106 Stat. 1460

Legislative history
- Introduced in the Senate as S.12 by John Danforth (R-MO) on January 14, 1991; Committee consideration by United States Senate Committee on Commerce, Science, and Transportation Subcommittee on Communications; Passed the Senate on January 31, 1992 (73-18); Passed the House on July 23, 1992 (voice vote); Reported by the joint conference committee on September 14, 1992; agreed to by the House on September 17, 1992 (280-128) and by the Senate on September 22, 1992 (74-25); Vetoed by President George H. W. Bush on October 3, 1992; Overridden by the House on October 5, 1992 (308-114); Overridden by the Senate and became law on October 5, 1992 (74-25)

The Cable Television Consumer Protection and Competition Act of 1992 (also known as the 1992 Cable Act) is a United States federal law which required cable television systems to carry most local broadcast television channels and prohibited cable operators from charging local broadcasters to carry their signal.

In adopting the 1992 Cable Act, Congress stated that it wanted to promote the availability of diverse views and information, to rely on the marketplace to the maximum extent possible to achieve that availability, to ensure cable operators continue to expand their capacity and program offerings, to ensure cable operators do not have undue market power, and to ensure consumer interests are protected in the receipt of cable service. The Federal Communications Commission adopted regulations to implement the Act and its goals.

== Legislative history ==
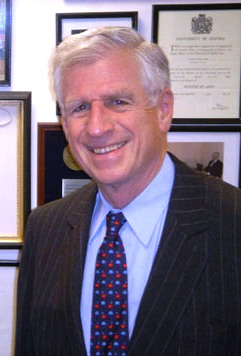
Senator John Danforth, the sponsor of the Cable Television Consumer Protection and Competition Act

The Legislation was passed by the 102nd United States Congress and sponsored by Senator John C. Danforth from Missouri. The act was first introduced to the Senate on January 14, 1991. The United States House of Representatives passed the bill on September 17, 1992 (voting 280–128), and the United States Senate passed it on September 22, 1992 (voting 74–25). It was vetoed by President George H. W. Bush on October 3, 1992. After the veto of the President, it again passed Senate over veto on October 5, 1992 (voting 74–25) and on the same day, it passed the House as well (voting 308–114). The Act became a Public Law No: 102-385 on October 5, 1992; it was the only veto override under Bush.

The Communications Act of 1934 was first amended in October 1984 by the U.S. Congress' Cable Communications Act of 1984. The general purpose of Cable Communications Act of 1984 was to define jurisdictional boundaries for regulating cable television systems among federal, state and local authorities.

After 1984 Act had been enacted, the failure to balance the unequal growth within provider and subscriber has become problematic. While there was an increase in the number of households subscribing to cable television system and channel capacity of cable systems, the competition among distributors of cable services held back. The rates for cable services increased excessively, surpassing inflation. As a result, the Cable Television Consumer Protection and Competition Act of 1992 had been enacted by the U.S. Congress. The Act had the goal to restore Federal regulation of the cable television industry and respond to complaints about poor cable service and high rates.

The chairman of the House Telecommunications and Finance subcommittee and Democrat of Massachusetts Representative Edward J. Markey said "This is a pro-consumer, pro-competition bill designed to rein in the renegades in the cable industry who are gouging consumers with repeated rate increases".

== Provisions ==
The Cable Television Consumer Protection and Competition Act of 1992 addressed various areas such as ensuring the growth of cable operators under effective competition, expanding the diversity of view and information through increased availability of cable television to the public, and protecting the interests of video programmers and consumers.

In order to promote competition among cable services, the act restrained federal agencies or states from regulating the rates for the provision of cable service. In the legislature, when describing competition among cable providers, the term "effective" was used and defined. The term "effective competition" meant that a fewer than 30 percent of the households in the franchise area subscribe to the cable service of a cable system. The rate regulation were to take effect 180 days after the date of enactment, and the Federal Communications Commission could prescribe regulations on the day of enactment.

The assurance of increased availability of cable television to the public was achieved through making the carriage of local commercial television signals an obligation for cable operators. The legislation states that each cable operator must carry the signals of local commercial television stations and qualified low-power broadcasting stations. Carriage of additional broadcast television signals on such system was stated to be at the discretion of such operator. In detail, a cable operator of a cable system that had 12 or fewer usable activated channels had to carry at least three local commercial television stations' signals. The local commercial television station refers to any full-power television station with a broadcast license and operating on a channel regularly assigned to its community by the commission that was within the same television market as the cable system. Television stations could opt out of cable carriage by invoking retransmission consent.

In contribution to diversifying channel selection for the public, Section 5 of the Cable Television Consumer Protection and Competition Act of 1992 also requires each cable operator of a cable system to carry the signals of qualified non-commercial educational television stations.

The consumer protection and customer service is ensured through Section 8. To suggest change in the treatment of such public, Section 632 of the Communications Act of 1934 had been amended. Firstly, the franchising authority was to establish and enforce customer service requirements of the cable operator. Secondly, the commission had to establish standards, which would urge cable operators to fulfill their customer service requirements within 180 days of enactment of the Cable Television Consumer Protection and Competition Act of 1992. Lastly, consumer protection laws and customer service requirement agreement standards set by the commission had to be strictly followed.

=== Program access rules ===
In order to allow competition and fair access to programming by direct-broadcast satellite providers, the act also contained a provision that required cable channels to offer their carriage to satellite providers at reasonable rates if they were owned by a cable provider themselves.

The rule had a notable loophole since it took effect only if the channel used satellites as part of its distribution infrastructure. That came to be known as the terrestrial loophole. It was famously used by several regional sports networks directly owned by cable companies, such as Comcast SportsNet Philadelphia (owned by the locally-based Comcast cable company), Cox Cable's 4SD in San Diego (a local channel that carried San Diego Padres coverage), and MSG (then owned by Cablevision, it has since been spun out into a separate entity). As they did not use satellite uplinks, their owners were able to selectively prevent competing television providers from having access to the networks, and then used their exclusivity to attract subscribers from competing services (such as satellite providers). For example, MSG used the loophole to prevent the competing Verizon FiOS service from carrying its high-definition feed.

The FCC began an effort to remove the loophole following complaints by AT&T and considered 4SD's refusal to allow carriage on its U-verse service (but still allowing cable companies in other areas of the city to carry it) to be an anti-competitive practice. The company cited that its inability to carry 4SD had hurt the market share of U-verse television in San Diego by taking it below its average share in other markets. In 2010, the FCC voted to modify the rules to remove the loophole.

In October 2012, the FCC voted to sunset the program access rules. The commission argued that the rule was antiquated since satellite and IPTV-based competitors had become capable of sustaining viable competition to cable. The FCC will still address discriminatory carriage practices but only on a case-by-base basis.

== Criticism ==
After the Cable Television Consumer Protection and Competition Act of 1992 had been enacted, there was a district court ruling pressing for change in the Act during the following year 1993. Judge Thomas Penfield Jackson of the district court in Washington did support regulation of cable rates by the 1992 Cable Act saying that horizontal-integration limitation between cable operators and broadcast stations with local cable system was intended to promote competition by preventing concentration of cable systems connected under the hands of a few companies. On the other hand, the Judge stated that Cable Act had not specified limits on horizontal integration thus, ordered the Federal Communications Commission to come up with regulations. The regulation would require a cable operator to construct "reasonable limits" on the number of subscribers they could reach.

== Impact ==
The Congress' passage of the Cable Television Consumer Protection and Competition Act of 1992 authorized broadcast stations to demand payment from cable systems that carry them. Nearing the monetary agreement deadline and retransmission effective date on October 6, 1993, there was an incremental conflict between broadcast stations and cable systems. If cable systems failed to meet certain consensus, it was to be dropped from the station's lineups.

The two sides of the story can be described as follows: broadcast stations demanded compensation on a per-subscriber basis from cable operators insisting that its production worth a value. Cable companies on the other hand took a pro-subscriber side, saying that what is free already – e.g., households with antennas can receive a signal for free – should remain free.

Another media source have revealed that, on the issue of cable operators "must-carry" cable television broadcasters option stated in the Cable Act of 1992, both sides showed signs of bewilderment lost in the 500-page law.

Consequently, as a way of satisfying the needs of both broadcast stations and cable companies, new cable channels that were run by broadcast networks and carried by cable systems were created.

== See also ==
- Communications Act of 1934
- Cable Communications Policy Act of 1984
- Telecommunications Act of 1996
- Aereo
