= Leased access =

US TV mandate for independent programming

Leased access is airtime that the Federal Communications Commission (FCC) mandates must be provided by cable operators (such as Comcast Xfinity and Charter Spectrum) for use by independent cable programmers and producers who are not owned by the operators. Leased access airtime may be purchased on specialty channels by individuals or groups with E&O insurance for the purposes of airing television programming content, usually local programming.

Some low-power television stations, often affiliated with The WB and UPN, could only air their programming on a cable system through the purchase of leased access time, as they were not covered by the FCC's must-carry regulations to require their stations to be carried; often this came with no built-in promotion by a cable system which often regarded their other programming as sub-standard as the reason for traditional carriage refusal, or any call out of the programming carried in their channel lineups (where they were listed only as 'paid' or 'leased access' and with no program listings), meaning the station would have to find alternate means to promote their cable carriage.

The purchase of leased access for low-power stations has significantly been reduced as those stations are now often owned by a larger full-power sister station which require that station's carriage as a condition in retransmission consent negotiations for the full-power station's (or often a sister national pay-TV network's) carriage, or as part of that station's digital subchannel lineup.

The prices for leased access are subject to a maximum set by an FCC formula and therefore in theory cannot be manipulated by cable companies. Cable companies, however, can "manipulate" prices through lobbying the FCC. Indeed, in 1997, the FCC set maximum prices based on an "average implicit fee" formula which set the prices considered by cable programmers to be remarkably high. Lower prices would encourage increased usage of leased access by independent programmers.

In practice, this has meant in markets without a need for leased access and whose needs can be fulfilled by public, educational, and government access/PEG or public-access television channels (which provide their facilities at no to minimum cost), a channel's time is usually bought out en masse by networks and entities who only air shopping channels, paid programming or televangelism on a full-time basis, often merely carrying a national network feed with no local deviation, though still having no guide listings provided unless so paid for by the network, allowing a provider to profit off a steadier source of revenue than from disparate programmers and producers.

This type of programming direction has only increased as the former purchasers of leased access have moved on to more reasonable online video options, with both better promotional opportunities and none of the issues, complications, and regulations which have long saddled leased access channels and time slots.

== See also ==
- Brokered programming, radio counterpart to leased access
