= Non-commercial activity =

Activity that does not involve commerce

A non-commercial (also spelled noncommercial) activity is an activity that is not carried out in the interest of profit. The opposite is commercial, something that primarily serves profit interests and is focused on business.

For example, advertising-free community radio stations are typically nonprofit organizations staffed by individuals volunteering their efforts to air a wide variety of radio programming, and do not run explicit radio advertisements, included in the United States specific grouping of "non-commercial educational" (NCE) public radio stations.

== Copyright and licenses ==
Some Creative Commons licenses include a "non-commercial" option, which has been controversial in definition. In a 2008 survey conducted in the United States, some respondents interpreted the concept as:

- "If I have nothing to gain from it, then it's non-commercial."
- "If you can afford to pay for it, do it; otherwise it's OK anyway"
- "What we consider to have "genuine" educational purpose"
