= World Association of Community Radio Broadcasters =

Umbrella organization

- Association Mondiale Des Radiodiffuseurs Communautaires
- AMARC logo 2015
- Abbreviation: MARCAmen
- Formation: 1983
- Legal status: Active, four-yearly meetings
- Purpose: World body for community radio broadcasters
- Members: 3000 members approx.
- Website: amarc-international.com

The World Association of Community Radio Broadcasters (French: Association Mondiale Des Radiodiffuseurs Communautaires, AMARC) is the international umbrella organization of community radio broadcasters founded in 1983, with nearly 3,000 members in 110 countries. Its mission is to support and contribute to the development of community and participatory radio along the principles of solidarity and international cooperation.

The association is a member of the International Freedom of Expression Exchange, a global network of non-governmental organisations that monitors free expression violations worldwide and defends journalists, writers, Internet users and others who are persecuted for exercising their right to freedom of expression. It is involved in the Tunisia Monitoring Group, a coalition of 16 free expression groups that campaign to end human rights violations in Tunisia. It has also supported the Boycott, Divestment and Sanctions movement against Israel, over Israel's policies and actions during the Arab-Israeli conflict.

Members of the association gather every 3–4 years for a general assembly. Many member stations also operate organisations at the regional or national level. For example, New Zealand community radio stations belong as stations of the Association of Community Access Broadcasters.

== Principles ==
=== Operational principles ===
Association members are required to uphold the following principles:

- Believe in the need to democratise access to information and communication in order to promote more just relationships and equitable exchanges among peoples.
- Contribute to the expression of different social, cultural and political movements – in all their diversity – by working to promote all initiatives that encourage peace, friendship among peoples, democracy, and development.
- Recognize the fundamental and specific role of women in establishing new communication practices. Women's participation in the decision-making structures of community radio stations is essential.

=== Programming principles ===
Association members are required to do the following things through their programming:

- Respect for peoples’ sovereignty and independence.
- Respect for solidarity and non-intervention in the internal affairs of other countries.
- International cooperation based on equality, solidarity, mutual respect, and the refusal of all discrimination based on race, gender, sexual orientation, or religion.
- Respect for the cultural identity of all people.

== History ==
=== General assemblies ===
The association began as a movement in 1983, during a gathering in Montreal. It became an association at its 1986 conference in Vancouver and was recognised as a non-government organisation at its 1988 conference in Managua. The 1990 conference in Dublin focused on freedom of expression, and an International Women's Network and International Solidarity Network were launched at the 1992 conference in Oaxtepec. The independence of local members and branches was recognised in the 1995 Dakar conference, and the need to collaborate on technology and legal issues was recognised in the 1998 Milan conference.

The 2003 Kathmandu conference hosted the signing of the Kathmandu Declaration - an agreement that "rampant militarism, accelerated privatization of the world's basic resources, religious fundamentalism and extreme capitalism" posted a critical threat to human rights. The declaration stated that radio was "the most affordable, egalitarian and accessible communication technology" in the world. It called on every government to recognize and uphold the right to freedom of expression, including the right to radio spectrum and community radio broadcasting, particularly for disadvantaged groups like women, children and disabled people.

At the 2010 general assembly in Bangalore, members committed to promoting opportunities for indigenous communities to access community broadcasting. Their declaration stated that research and documentation of traditional knowledge is important to preserving and conserving indigenous traditions, languages, cultures and the management of natural resources.

=== Local activities ===
By 2003, the African arm of the association was supporting the legal, political and cultural framework in which both men and woman were able and encouraged to participate in radio broadcasting. It had a regional network of broadcasters to distribute information, share experiences and transfer skills. The association was also giving members access to new technology, human resources and training programmes on broadcasting, gender issues, new technologies and communication. It was also coordinating exchanges, research, content development, new initiatives and news gathering.

The World Association of Community Radio Broadcasters was also involved in the development of community radio in other parts of the world. Between 2003 and 2008, it helped Fijian women trial "radio in a suitcase" using mobile facilities. Its member stations in Sri Lanka, Australia and New Zealand have also been recognised for giving women and minorities new opportunities to broadcast their views. The association has many member stations in Nepal, and has sought funding to restore their broadcasting infrastructure.

=== International activities ===
During August and September 2014, the Food and Agriculture Organization and the World Association of Community Radio Broadcasters hosted regional virtual consultations for the global farming community. The consultations were open to development professionals, people involved in community media, rural development agencies and private sector companies. The campaign marked the International Year of Family Farming.

Between March and December 2015, the two organisations collaborated again to produce 80 audio pieces by producers and community radio journalists to recognise the International Year of Soils. The twice-weekly series was aimed at sparking discussions and education about the environment, climate change, food security, agriculture, sustainable development, resilience, and the importance of soils.

== Lobbying ==
=== Radio industry lobbying ===
At the 2003 ITU World Summit on the Information Society, the World Association of Community Radio Broadcasters criticised the lack of representation of community-based media. It made a submission to the summit to have community radio recognised as important, and submitted that community-based radio stations should be allocated "suitable frequencies, equitable access to licenses, and public financial and technological support and training".

The submission went on to argue community media are key to creating a "strong, socially responsible civil society'", provided they have sufficient financial resources and can respect and preserve their independence from government and commercial media. The association said governments should reinvest their revenues from the sale of spectrum, cable and telecommunications licenses into social communication objectives, and provide tax incentives, production funds and legislative support for community radio stations.

=== Political lobbying ===
In 2011, the association wrote a letter in support of the Boycott, Divestment and Sanctions movement against Israel. In it, the association said it boycott was in line with the front-line community access broadcasting model of its member stations. The letter said the International Middle East Media Center, a member station in Palestinian territory, was reporting on the daily life for Palestinians for many of its member stations around the world. However, the association did not claim to speak on behalf of any member stations.

In 2012, the association held the Tunisia Community-Associative Media Conference, a gathering of 60 freedom of expression activists from Tunisia, and community radio leaders from around the world. The conference focused on advocacy, content development and radio production, and ways community broadcasting to cause change in Tunisia. Its focus was on the freedom of expression of both men and women in Tunisia, as it fitted into the wider political and social context.

== See also ==
- Alternative media
- Community radio
