= List of NPR personnel =

The following is a list of National Public Radio personnel:

== Leadership ==
NPR leadership, as of January 2026:

- Katherine Maher, president and CEO
- Jarl Mohn, president emeritus, board member of NPR Foundation, and co-chair of NPR's 50th anniversary capital campaign.
- Malik Abdullah, Vice President, Product
- Elizabeth A. Allen, Chief Legal Officer
- Meg Brennan, Vice President, Content Business Strategy & Operations
- Rachel Evans, Chief Development Officer
- Thomas Evans, Editor in Chief
- Stacey Foxwell, Vice president, operations
- Gemma Hooley, Senior Vice President, Member Partnership
- Lori Kaplan, Vice President, Audience Insights
- Daphne Kwon, CFO and treasurer
- Whitney M. Maddox, Vice President, Diversity, Equity & Inclusion
- Eric Marrapodi, Vice President, News Programming
- Marta McLellan Ross, Chief of Staff
- Ryan Merkley, Chief Operating Officer
- Badri Munipalla, Vice President, Distribution
- Chris Nelson, Senior Vice President, Technology Operations
- Erica Osher, Vice President, AI Labs
- Julie Parr, Vice President, Development
- Mishka Pitter-Armand, Chief Marketing Officer
- Eva Rodriguez, Vice President and Executive Editor
- Yolanda Sangweni, Vice President, Programming and New Content Development
- Laura Soto-Barra, Vice President, Research, Archives and Data Strategy
- Joel Sucherman, Vice President, Audio Platform Strategy
- Sharahn Thomas-Fulton, Vice President, Content Operations
- Heather Walls, Senior Vice President, Communications
- Darryl Walston, Senior Vice President, People Team

== News hosts ==
- Ailsa Chang – Co-Host, All Things Considered, Culver City, California
- Scott Detrow – Co-Host, weekend All Things Considered and Consider This
- Leila Fadel – Co-Host, Morning Edition*
- Deepa Fernandes – Co-Host, Here and Now
- Steve Inskeep – Co-Host, Morning Edition, Washington, D.C.
- Mary Louise Kelly – Co-Host, All Things Considered
- Michel Martin – Co-host, Morning Edition; since 2023
- A Martínez – Co-Host, Morning Edition, Culver City, California; since 2021
- Peter O'Dowd – Guest Host, Here and Now
- Ayesha Rascoe – Host, Weekend Edition Sunday, Co-Host NPR Sunday Puzzle
- Scott Simon – Host, Weekend Edition Saturday
- Juana Summers – Co-Host, All Things Considered
- Scott Tong – Co-Host, Here and Now
- Robin Young – Co-Host, Here and Now

=== Former news hosts ===
- Rachel Martin – Co-host, Morning Edition; 2016-2023
- Ari Shapiro – Co-host, All Things Considered; left October 2025
- Robert Siegel – Former Host, All Things Considered; retired January 2018
- Melissa Block – Special Correspondent and former Host, All Things Considered; retired from hosting in 2015, and retired from NPR in 2023

== Syndicated hosts ==
- Rund Abdelfatah – Co-Host, Throughline
- Ramtin Arablouei – Co-Host, Throughline
- Amanda Aronczyk – Co-Host/ Reporter, Planet Money
- David Bianculli – TV Critic/Guest Host, Fresh Air
- Bob Boilen – Host, All Songs Considered
- Meghna Chakrabarti – Host, On Point
- Mary Childs – Co-Host/ Reporter, Planet Money
- Felix Contreras – Host, Alt.Latino
- Dave Davies – Guest Host, Fresh Air
- Gene Demby – Co-Host/ Correspondent, Code Switch
- Raina Douris – Host, World Cafe
- Karen Duffin – Co-Host/ Reporter, Planet Money
- Cardiff Garcia – Co-Host, The Indicator from Planet Money
- Jacob Goldstein –Co-Host/ Correspondent, Planet Money
- Sarah Gonzalez –Co-Host/ Reporter, Planet Money
- Terry Gross – Host, Fresh Air
- Aisha Harris – Co-Host, Pop Culture Happy Hour
- Robin Hilton – Host, All Songs Considered
- Maria Hinojosa – Host, Latino USA
- Linda Holmes – Co-Host, Pop Culture Happy Hour
- Kamilah Kashanie – Host, StoryCorps Podcast
- Bill Littlefield – Former host, Only A Game
- Tom and Ray Magliozzi – Former Hosts, Car Talk
- Christian McBride – Host, Jazz Night in America
- Kelly McEvers – Host, Embedded
- Kia Miaka Natisse – Co-Host, Invisibilia
- Christopher O'Riley – Former host, From the Top
- Guy Raz – Host, How I Built This
- Fiona Ritchie – Host, The Thistle & Shamrock
- Peter Sagal – Host, Wait Wait... Don't Tell Me
- Sam Sanders – Correspondent/ Former host, It's Been a Minute
- Yowei Shaw – Co-Host, Invisibilia
- Madeline K. Sofia – Host, Short Wave
- Stacey Vanek Smith – Co-Host, The Indicator from Planet Money
- Stephen Thompson – Co-Host, Pop Culture Happy Hour
- Shankar Vedantam - Host, Hidden Brain
- Gregory Warner – Host, Rough Translation
- Glen Weldon – Co-Host, Pop Culture Happy Hour
- Jenn White – Host, 1A
- Manoush Zomorodi – Host, TED Radio Hour

== NPR News ==
=== Correspondents and reporters ===
==== Washington Desk ====
- Ximena Bustillo - Multiplatform Reporter, Washington Desk
- Susan Davis – Congressional Correspondent
- Ron Elving – Senior Editor/ Correspondent, Washington Desk
- Don Gonyea – National Political Correspondent
- Claudia Grisales – Congressional Reporter
- Carrie Johnson – Justice Correspondent
- Tamara Keith – White House Correspondent
- Michele Kelemen – Correspondent, State Department
- Danielle Kurtzleben – Political Reporter
- Mara Liasson – National Political Correspondent
- Ryan Lucas – Justice Correspondent
- Domenico Montanaro – Senior Political Editor/ Correspondent, Washington Desk
- Greg Myre – Correspondent, National Security
- Brian Naylor – Correspondent, Washington Desk
- Franco Ordoñez – White House Correspondent
- Miles Parks – Reporter, Voting and Elections
- Deepa Shivaram - White House Correspondent (formerly Multiplatform Reporter, Washington Desk).
- Kelsey Snell – Congressional Correspondent
- Barbara Sprunt – Congressional Reporter
- Nina Totenberg – Correspondent, Legal Affairs, Washington Desk
- Deirdre Walsh – Congress Editor/ Acting Congressional Correspondent
- David Welna – Correspondent, Washington Desk

==== National Desk ====
- Noah Adams – Contributing Correspondent, National Desk
- Greg Allen – Correspondent, National Desk, Miami
- Chris Arnold – Correspondent, National Desk, Boston
- Tom Bowman – Pentagon Reporter, National Desk, Washington
- John Burnett – Correspondent, National Desk, Austin, Texas - retired 2023
- Cheryl Corley – Correspondent, National Desk, Chicago
- Debbie Elliott – Correspondent, National Desk
- Adrian Florido – Correspondent, National Desk
- Jasmine Garsd – Correspondent, National Desk
- Wade Goodwyn – Correspondent, National Desk, Dallas (1991–2023)
- Richard Gonzales – Correspondent, National Desk, San Francisco
- Sally Herships – Freelance Reporter
- Ina Jaffe (d. 2024) – Correspondent, National Desk, Culver City, CA
- Martin Kaste – Law Enforcement Correspondent, National Desk, Seattle
- Quil Lawrence – Veterans Correspondent, New York
- Brian Mann – Correspondent, Addiction Issues
- Sarah McCammon – Correspondent, National Desk/ Guest Host
- Joel Rose – Correspondent, Immigration, National Desk
- Nathan Rott – Correspondent, Environment and the American West, National Desk
- David Schaper – Reporter, National Desk, Chicago
- Kirk Siegler – Correspondent, National Desk, Boise
- Tovia Smith – Correspondent, National Desk, Boston
- Hansi Lo Wang – Correspondent, National Desk
- Eric Westervelt – Correspondent, National Desk, San Francisco

==== International Desk ====
- Deborah Amos – International Correspondent
- Jane Arraf – International Correspondent, Cairo
- Anas Baba - Reporter, Gaza
- Eleanor Beardsley – International Correspondent, Paris
- Daniel Estrin – International Correspondent, Jerusalem
- Emily Feng – International Correspondent, Beijing
- Lauren Frayer – International Correspondent, London
- Diaa Hadid – International Correspondent, Mumbai
- Carrie Kahn – International Correspondent, Rio de Janeiro
- Joanna Kakissis – International Contributor, Athens
- Peter Kenyon – International Correspondent, Istanbul
- Anthony Kuhn – Foreign Correspondent, Seoul
- Frank Langfitt – International Correspondent, London
- Charles Maynes – International Correspondent, Moscow
- Julie McCarthy – International Correspondent, Southeast Asia
- John Otis – Freelance Reporter, Bogotá
- Eyder Peralta – International Correspondent, Mexico City (since 2022)
- Sylvia Poggioli – Former Senior European Correspondent, Foreign Desk, retired 2023
- Ofeibea Quist-Arcton – former International Correspondent, Dakar, retired
- Philip Reeves – International Correspondent, London
- John Ruwitch – Reporter, U.S.- China Relations
- Rob Schmitz – International Correspondent, Berlin
- Ruth Sherlock – International Correspondent, Lebanon
- Teri Schultz – Freelance International Reporter, Brussels
- Michael Sullivan – International Correspondent, Senior Asia Correspondent

==== Arts Desk ====
- Eric Deggans – TV Critic
- Mandalit del Barco – Correspondent, Arts Desk, Culver City, CA
- Andrew Limbong – Reporter, Arts Desk
- Jeff Lunden – Freelance Arts Reporter
- Bob Mondello – Movie Critic
- Ann Powers – Music Critic
- Neda Ulaby – Reporter, Arts Desk

==== Business Desk ====
- Bobby Allyn – Technology Correspondent, Los Angeles
- Shannon Bond – Technology Correspondent, San Francisco
- Camila Domonoske – Correspondent, Business Desk
- David Gura (2021-2024) – Correspondent
- Scott Horsley – Chief Economics Correspondent
- Andrea Hsu – Labor and Workplace Correspondent
- Yuki Noguchi – Correspondent, Business Desk
- Alina Selyukh – Correspondent, Business Desk

==== Culture Desk ====
- Elizabeth Blair – Correspondent, Culture Desk
- Anastasia Tsioulcas – Correspondent, Culture Desk

==== Science Desk ====
- Nurith Aizenman – Correspondent, Global Health and International Development
- Allison Aubrey – Correspondent, Science Desk
- Jason Beaubien – Correspondent, Global Health and Development
- Geoff Brumfiel – Senior Editor/ Correspondent, Science Desk
- Dan Charles – Food and Agriculture Correspondent, Science Desk
- Rhitu Chatterjee – Correspondent, Health
- Michaeleen Doucleff – Reporter, Science Desk
- Maria Godoy – Senior Editor/ Correspondent, Science Desk
- Nell Greenfieldboyce – Reporter, Science Desk
- Jon Hamilton – Correspondent, Science Desk
- Pien Huang – Reporter, Science Desk
- Rebecca Hersher – Reporter, Science Desk
- Christopher Joyce – Correspondent, Science Desk
- Jennifer Ludden – Energy and Environment Editor
- Sydney Lupkin – Correspondent, Pharmaceuticals
- Joe Palca – Correspondent, Science Desk
- Selena Simmons-Duffin – Reporter, Health Policy
- Lauren Sommer – Correspondent, Science Desk
- Rob Stein – Senior Editor/ Correspondent, Science Desk
- Will Stone – Reporter, Health

==== Planet Money ====
- Sally Helm – Reporter, Planet Money
- Kenny Malone – Correspondent, Planet Money
- Keith Romer – Contributing Reporter, Planet Money
- Greg Rosalsky – Reporter, Planet Money
- Robert Smith – Correspondent, Planet Money

==== Code Switch ====
- Karen Grigsby Bates – Senior Correspondent, Code Switch

==== Investigations unit ====
- Tom Dreisbach – Correspondent, Investigations
- Chiara Eisner – Reporter, Investigations
- Sacha Pfeiffer – Correspondent, Investigations/ Guest Host
- Joseph Shapiro – Correspondent, Investigations
- Laura Sullivan – Correspondent, Investigations
- Cheryl W. Thompson – Correspondent, Investigations

==== Other ====
- David Folkenflik – Media Correspondent
- Tom Goldman – Correspondent, Sports
- Anya Kamenetz – Correspondent, Education
- Kat Lonsdorf – Reporter
- Jenna McLaughlin – Cybersecurity Correspondent
- Elissa Nadworny – Reporter, Education
- Peter Overby - Reporter, Power, Money & Influence
- Jerome Socolovsky – Audio Storytelling Specialist, NPR Training
- Susan Stamberg – Special Correspondent
- Cory Turner – Senior Editor/ Correspondent, NPR Ed Team
- Linda Wertheimer – Senior National Correspondent
- Odette Yousef – National Security Correspondent (focus on extremism)

==== Breaking news reporters ====
- Jaclyn Diaz – Reporter
- Jonathan Franklin – Reporter
- Joe Hernandez – Reporter
- Vanessa Romo – Reporter
- Laurel Wamsley – Reporter

==== Newscast unit ====
- Dwane Brown – Newscaster (Weekdays, All Things Considered interludes)
- Korva Coleman – Newscaster (Weekdays, 6 a.m. – 11 a.m.)
- Amy Held – Newscasts Editor; Fill-In Newscaster
- Jeanine Herbst – Newscaster (Weekends, 5 p.m. – 10 p.m.)
- Linda Kenyon – Fill-In Newscaster
- Windsor Johnston – Newscaster (Weekends, 5 a.m. – 10 a.m.)
- Lori Lundin – Freelance Newscaster
- Dave Mattingly – Newscaster (Weekdays, 5 a.m./ Morning Edition interludes)
- Nora Raum – Newscaster (Weekends, 11 a.m. – 4 p.m.)
- Dan Ronan – Fill-In Newscaster
- Louise Schiavone – Freelance Newscaster
- Lakshmi Singh – Newscaster (Weekdays, 12 p.m. – 4 p.m.)
- Giles Snyder – Newscaster (Weekdays, 11 p.m. – 4 a.m.)
- Ryland Barton – Newscaster (Weekdays, 5 p.m. – 10 p.m.)
- Dale Willman – Newscaster (Weekends, 11 p.m. – 4 a.m.)
- Doualy Xaykaothao – Fill-In Newscaster
