= Wayne County Schools Career Center =

Location
- 518 W. Prospect St. Smithville, Ohio, 44677; Wayne County; United States; 40°51′50.0″N 81°52′08.4″W

Information
- Type: Public Vocational HS
- Grades: 11-12
- Website: WCSCC

Wayne County Schools Career Center is a public vocational school located in Smithville, Ohio. The school derives its name from the fact that it primarily serves students from the public school districts and private schools located in Wayne County, Ohio.

== Associate schools ==
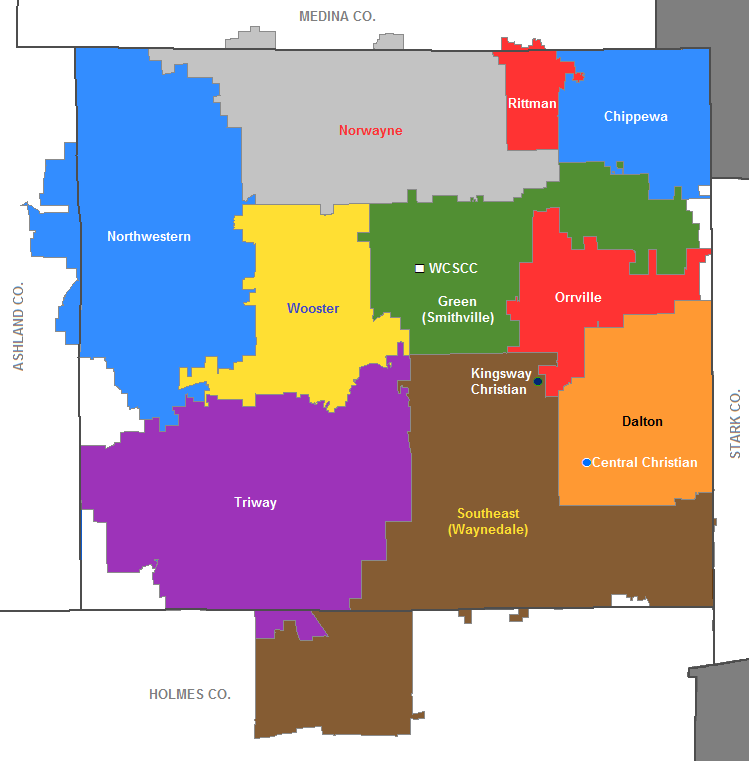
School districts served by WCSCC.
- Central Christian High School
- Chippewa High School
- Dalton High School
- Heritage Private School
- Kingsway Christian School
- Northwestern High School
- Norwayne High School
- Orrville High School
- Rittman High School
- Smithville High School
- Triway High School
- Waynedale High School
- Wooster High School

== History ==
Wayne County Schools Career Center began in 1969 as the Wayne County Joint Vocational School, offering 22 programs and three academic classes to 490 students. Smithville was chosen as the school's location since it was centrally located for all of the participating districts. Adult Education in the county that had begun in 1967 moved into the building the same time the JVS was opened. The name was changed to WCSCC in 1984 after more programs were offered.

WCSCC currently offers 26 programs and 18 academic classes to about 750 high school students and over 3,000 Adult Education students.
