= Jeremy Hobson =

American national radio journalist

- Education: Boston University
- Presenting career
- Show: Here and Now
- Station: WBUR-FM
- Network: NPR
- Previous show: Marketplace Morning Report (2011–2013)

Jeremy Hobson is an American national radio journalist and podcaster. He hosts the weekly show The Middle with Jeremy Hobson.

He was a co-host, along with Robin Young and Tonya Mosley, of NPR and WBUR's Here and Now. He left the show in October 2020.

== Education and personal life ==
A native of Urbana, Illinois, Hobson graduated from University High School in 1999 and received his undergraduate degree from Boston University. He is the son of pianist Ian Hobson. Hobson is gay, and was the first openly LGBT person to host a WBUR program.

== Career ==
Prior to his tenure at NPR, Hobson worked at NPR member stations WCAI (Cape Cod, Massachusetts), WILL (Urbana, Illinois), and Rhode Island Public Radio, as a reporter and local show host. He has also been a producer for NPR’s All Things Considered, Day to Day and Wait Wait... Don't Tell Me!. Hobson hosted the Marketplace Morning Report from 2011 to 2013.
