= Deepa Fernandes =

American journalist

- Fernandes in 2026
- Born: Mumbai
- Education: University of Technology Sydney (BA); Columbia University Journalism School (MA); Stanford University, John S. Knight Journalism Fellow
- Years active: 2000-
- Employers: WBUR; NPR
- Website: http://deepafernandes.com/

Deepa Fernandes is a journalist with a focus on radio journalism. She has been one of the hosts of NPR's Here and Now. Before that, she hosted the WBAI radio program Wakeup Call and the nationally syndicated Pacifica radio news show Free Speech Radio News on the politically independent, anti-war Pacifica Radio Network. Fernandes has worked as a freelance producer for, among others, the British Broadcasting Corporation, the Australian Broadcasting Corporation, and Pacifica Radio.

== Biography ==
Deepa Fernandes was born in Mumbai, India to Goan parents and raised in Australia. She earned a Bachelor of Arts in Communications from the University of Technology Sydney. Fernandes began her career in journalism in Sydney, Australia, working as a daily news reader at 2SER and then producing a news magazine and radio show about Asia and the Pacific region. She then moved to Latin America, where she worked on a 26-part radio documentary series on indigenous communities in Ecuador. From there she went to Cuba to work as a daily features producer at Radio Havana Cuba. During this time, she also did long reporting stints in Chiapas and Oaxaca.

Fernandes next moved to New York City, where she went to work as a producer for the flagship Pacifica Radio program, Democracy Now!. At Pacifica's WBAI she co-produced Our Americas, a weekly radio program on issues affecting Latin America and the Caribbean, and hosted the weekday morning show, Wakeup Call. She also has been a co-anchor for Pacifica's national daily news program, Free Speech Radio News.

In January 2007, Fernandes spoke with Democracy Now's Amy Goodman about her new book, Targeted: National Security and the Business of Immigration, published by Seven Stories Press. She told Goodman that she "got into secondary inspection rooms around the country, because I had to, because I was coming in the country and I was processed through there."

Seeing a dearth of reporters of color, low-income reporters, and reporters outside the mainstream, she founded a youth media training program in New York City's public schools, which grew into a national media training organization, People's Production House. While working at WBAI and running People's Production House, she earned an MA from Columbia Journalism School. While in New York, she married multi-media journalist Matt Rogers, with whom she has two children.

In 2012, Fernandes was a Knight Fellow at Stanford University. In 2013 Fernandes joined the staff of NPR member station KPCC in Pasadena, California, where she covered a newly established beat on Early Childhood Development. In 2017, she began working as a freelance journalist from around the world for public radio shows, through a reporting fellowship at Pacific Oaks College.

In 2017, SoCal Connected, a series at KCET that Fernandes reported for, won an Emmy Award.

While living in Los Angeles, Fernandes joined the Los Angeles Press Club board and helped found the Foot In The Door fellowship program for new reporters from communities that are most often excluded from journalism.

In 2021, Fernandes and her family moved back to the Bay Area, where she joined the San Francisco Chronicle as an immigration correspondent and senior newsroom advisor on Race and Equity. In 2022, she joined Robin Young and Scott Tong on NPR and WBUR's Here and Now. At the end of April 2025, she stepped down from Here & Now to accept a fellowship in behavioral sciences at Stanford University.

Her sister, Sujatha, is an assistant professor of sociology at Queens College in New York City.
