= Jesse Wegman =

American journalist, author, and legal scholar

- Education: Wesleyan University (BA, 1996); New York University School of Law (JD, 2005)
- Occupations: Journalist, author, legal scholar
- Writing career
- Period: 2000s–present
- Genres: Non-fiction, history, constitutional law, politics
- Notable works: Let the People Pick the President (2020); The Lost Founder (2026)

Jesse Wegman (born about 1973) is an American journalist, author, and legal scholar who serves as a Senior Fellow at the Brennan Center for Justice. He is best known for his extensive work on the Supreme Court of the United States, electoral reform, and American constitutional history. From 2013 to 2025, he was a member of the The New York Times editorial board. He later joined the Brennan Center for Justice as a Senior Fellow.

Wegman is the author of two major books on American democracy: Let the People Pick the President: The Case for Abolishing the Electoral College (2020) and The Lost Founder: James Wilson and the Forgotten Fight for a People's Constitution (2026).

== Early life and education ==
Wegman is a native of Massachusetts and spent his youth growing up in Boston and Los Angeles. He graduated with a bachelor's degree in psychology from Wesleyan University in 1996, where he completed a senior thesis. He subsequently earned a Juris Doctor (J.D.) from the New York University School of Law in 2005, where he focused on constitutional law and civil liberties.

He clerked for Judge Gabriel W. Gorenstein at the U.S. District Court for the Southern District of New York.

== Career ==
=== Journalism ===
Before joining The New York Times, Wegman worked as a reporter and editor for various legal and mainstream media publications. He served as a producer and reporter for National Public Radio (NPR), a legal editor at Reuters, and held editorial positions at The New York Observer, Newsweek, and The Daily Beast. From 2012 to 2013, Wegman served as a senior editor and editorial operations manager for The Newsweek Daily Beast Company.

Wegman spent over a decade as a member of the The New York Times editorial board from 2013 to 2025. During his tenure, his writing focused heavily on legal affairs, the Supreme Court, democratic institutions, and electoral systems.

=== Public policy and scholarship ===
Following his departure from The New York Times editorial board, Wegman joined the Brennan Center for Justice as a Senior Fellow. In this role, he continues to write, comment, and lecture extensively on Supreme Court reform, voting rights, and constitutional amendments.

== Books ==
=== Let the People Pick the President (2020) ===
Wegman's first book, Let the People Pick the President: The Case for Abolishing the Electoral College, was published by St. Martin's Press in 2020. The book blends historical research from the Constitutional Convention with contemporary interviews of 21st-century political campaign managers. Wegman argues that the electoral college is an antiquated, anti-democratic system that reduces national elections to a handful of swing states. He advocates for reform through methods like the National Popular Vote Interstate Compact to ensure that every individual vote carries equal weight.

=== The Lost Founder (2026) ===
His second book, The Lost Founder: James Wilson and the Forgotten Fight for a People's Constitution, was published by Celadon Books in June 2026. The biography resurfaces the legacy of James Wilson, an influential but frequently overlooked Founding Father.

Wegman explores Wilson's pivotal role in shaping American democracy, detailing how he penned the first draft of the U.S. Constitution and fiercely advocated for a government rooted directly in popular sovereignty. The book highlights Wilson's then-radical belief that both the president and the legislature should be elected directly by a popular vote of the people.

== Bibliography ==
=== Books ===
- Let the People Pick the President: The Case for Abolishing the Electoral College (St. Martin's Press, 2020) ISBN 978-1250221971
- The Lost Founder: James Wilson and the Forgotten Fight for a People's Constitution (Celadon Books, 2026) ISBN 978-1250868206

== Selected journalism ==
=== The New York Times ===
- Wegman, Jesse (May 20, 2026). "Three Decades on the Supreme Court Is Too Long". The New York Times.
- Wegman, Jesse (April 15, 2026). "Is the Supreme Court Coming Apart at the Seams?". The New York Times.
- Wegman, Jesse (July 2, 2024). "The Supreme Court Is Gaslighting Us All". The New York Times.
- Wegman, Jesse (February 17, 2022). "When Walter Dellinger Spoke, 'the Justices Paid Attention'". The New York Times.

=== Brennan Center for Justice ===
- Wegman, Jesse (May 6, 2026). "The Supreme Court's Hermetically Sealed Logic on the Voting Rights Act". Brennan Center for Justice.
- Wegman, Jesse (February 12, 2026). "The Long History of Supreme Court Reform". Brennan Center for Justice.

=== Other ===
- Wegman, Jesse (May 1999). "Six Days". The Atlantic Monthly. Vol. 283, no. 5. p. 38. Subtitled "On learning a new alphabet"

== Awards and honors ==
- Pulitzer Prize for Public Service (2018) – Part of the The New York Times staff recognized for collective reporting and editorial work.
- Eugene C. Pulliam Fellowship for Editorial Writing (2023) – Awarded by the Society of Professional Journalists Foundation to fund his research into historical democratic routes in the United States.

== Interviews of Jesse Wegman ==
- Wegman, Jesse (June 16, 2026). "'The Lost Founder' profiles a brilliant lawyer who helped craft the Constitution". NPR (Interview). Interviewed by Dave Davies. Fresh Air. — Full-text transcript of Wegman's broadcast interview discussing his new book about James Wilson, a Founding Father.
- Fox, Blake (February 10, 2026). "Jesse Wegman '96 Reflects on Covering the Supreme Court for The New York Times and Previews His New Book on Founding Father James Wilson". The Wesleyan Argus. — A full-length profile interview exploring his transition to the Brennan Center for Justice and previewing his biography, The Lost Founder.
- "Examining the Electoral College: An Interview with Jesse Wegman". Brown Political Review. December 7, 2020. — A Q&A interview breaking down the structural effects of state-level winner-take-all rules.
- "'Let the People Pick the President': The Case for Abolishing the Electoral College". Democracy Now!. October 30, 2020. — Transcript of a joint media interview on executive branch accountability and the popular vote.
- Wegman, Jesse (March 27, 2020). "New York Times Editorial Board Member Jesse Wegman on Why We Should Abolish the Electoral College". Newsweek (Interview). Interviewed by Meredith Wolf Schizer. — Transcript of Wegman's interview discussing the history of the Electoral College, the many efforts to revamp it and why it would be better to choose the president based on the popular vote.
- Wegman, Jesse (March 18, 2020). "'Let The People Pick The President' Addresses Electoral College Reform". NPR (Interview). Interviewed by Dave Davies. Fresh Air. — Full-text transcript of Wegman's broadcast interview discussing constitutional history and democratic representation.

== Personal ==
Wegman is the son of David H. Wegman of Auburndale, Massachusetts, and the late Peggy Nelson Wegman (died in 2009). David H. Wegman retired as the dean of the School of Health and Environment at the University of Massachusetts Lowell. Peggy Nelson Wegman was a clinical psychotherapist in private practice in Auburndale, Massachusetts.

Jesse Wegman married Kyra Himmelbaum in August 2012 in Rockport, Massachusetts. Himmelbaum was an actress known professionally as Kyra Miller, and an assistant professor of acting at Tulane University.
