= Tonya Mosley =

American radio journalist

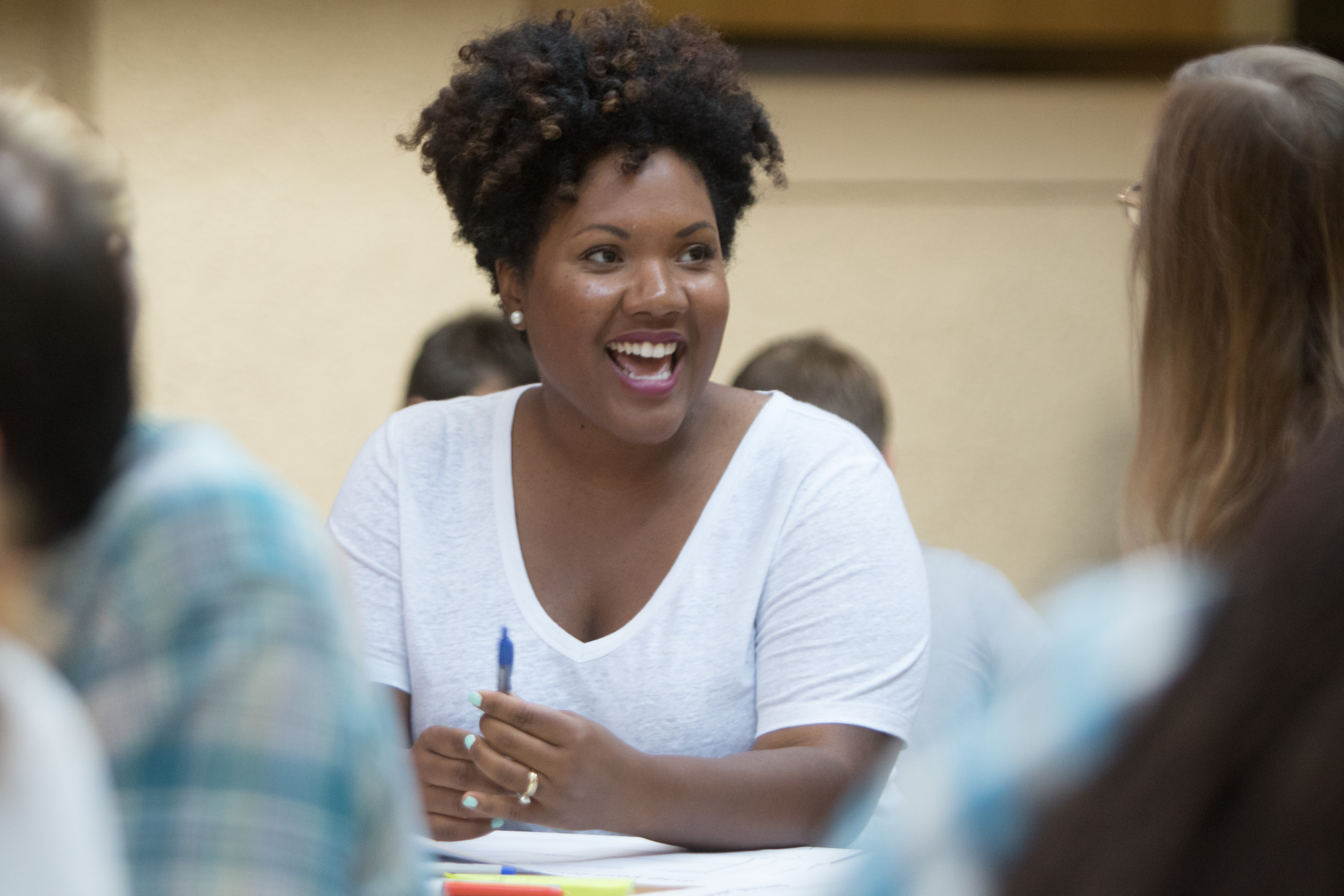
- Mosley at Stanford University, 2015
- Born: Detroit, Michigan, U.S.
- Education: University of Missouri
- Occupation: Broadcast journalist
- Years active: 1998–present
- Known for: Here and Now, Fresh Air
- Notable work: Beyond Ferguson, Black Seattle

Tonya Mosley is an American radio and television journalist and podcaster. Prior to 2022, Mosley co-hosted NPR and WBUR's midday talk show Here & Now along with Robin Young and Scott Tong. In 2015, she was awarded the John S. Knight journalism fellowship at Stanford. She hosts the podcast Truth Be Told, an advice show about race from KQED. In 2023, Mosley was named co-host of Fresh Air, a talk show broadcast on National Public Radio and produced by WHYY in Philadelphia.

== Life and career ==
Mosley was born in Detroit, Michigan, and grew up on the west side by Seven Mile and Southfield Freeway. She attended Redford High School. Before her work in public radio and podcasting, Mosley worked as a reporter and weekend anchor at NBC33 in Fort Wayne, Indiana; FOX 41 in Louisville, Kentucky; KING 5 in Seattle, Washington; and behind the scenes as a producer in several markets including Columbia, Missouri; Lansing, Michigan; Flint, Michigan; and Detroit, Michigan. Mosley reported for Al Jazeera America and KUOW. She has also been the Silicon Valley chief of San Francisco's public radio station KQED.

Mosley won an Emmy Award in 2016 for her televised piece "Beyond Ferguson," and a national Edward R. Murrow award for her public radio series "Black in Seattle." In 2010 Tonya Mosley created NewNaturalista.com. The popular site focused on healthy living, social justice, mental well-being, natural hair, and building wealth for women of color.
