= Piñata Protest =

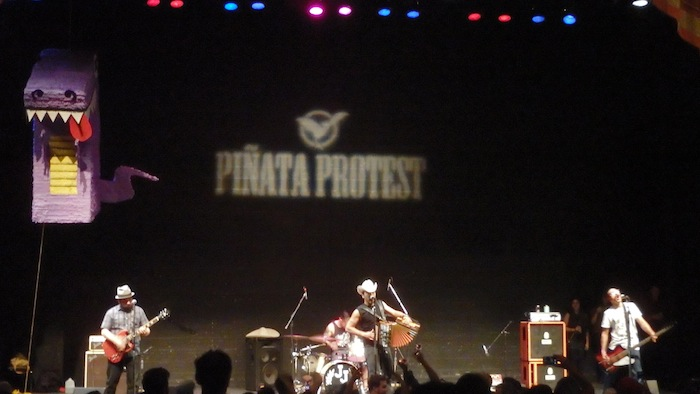
- Performance in March 2015

Background information
- Origin: San Antonio, Texas
- Genres: Punk rock
- Years active: 2006–present
- Labels: Saustex Media, Cosmica Records
- Website: www.pinataprotestband.com

Piñata Protest is an American punk rock band from San Antonio, Texas. The band is noted for their amalgamation of Tex-Mex and punk music with lyrics both in Spanish and English.

== Biography ==
In 2006, Lead singer and accordionist Alvaro Del Norte originally formed Piñata Protest with three other musicians, guitarist Manuel Garcia, drummer Victor Luna, and bassist Elliot Ramirez, all of whom have since left the band.

In 2010, debut EP Plethora was released.

In March 2012, Piñata Protest first performed at SXSW and have appeared multiple times since

In 2013, NPR Music referred to Piñata Protest's EP El Valiente as "the ultimate lesson of El Valiente: that the combination of accordions and punk represents an organic expression of the bicultural life lived by millions across this country".

In May 2015, NPR's Alt.Latino said of Piñata Protest, "We are big fan of the band".

In late October 2016, Piñata Protest went into the studio with producer Dave Irish to record at Pot O' Gold Recording in Orange, CA. Their brand new EP, titled "Cuatro Exitos", was released in May 2017 featured 4 tracks and served as a follow up to "El Valiente."

On April 6, 2018 the band released their full album "Necio Nights." It was released under the Spanish label Kasba Label.

Taking This Ride / Lado-a-Lado (2024): Released as a limited edition 45-vinyl single via the Pinata Protest Website

The band released their latest 6-song EP, titled No Sabo, on March 28, 2026

== Influences ==
- Punk rock influences come from bands such as Ramones, Nirvana, Los Crudos.
- Tex-Mex, or Norteño influences come from bands such as Los Tigres del Norte, Texas Tornados.

== Discography ==
=== Singles and EPs ===
- Plethora (2010)
- Plethora "Reloaded" (2012)
- El Valiente (2013)
- Cuatro Exitos (2017)
- Necio Nights (2018)
- Taking This Ride / Lado-a-Lado (2024)
- No Sabo EP (2026)

== Current members ==
- Alvaro Del Norte: Squeezebox, Vocals, Pocket trumpet
- Chris-Ruptive: Drums
- Richie Brown: Bass, vocals
- Regino Lopez: Guitar, vocals

=== Past members ===
- Jose Morales
- Manuel Garcia
- Omar Nambo
- Elliott Ramirez
- Victor Luna
- Marcus Cazares
- Matt Cazares
- JJ Martinez
