= Wooster Municipal Airport =

Coordinates: 40.84°N 81.91°W

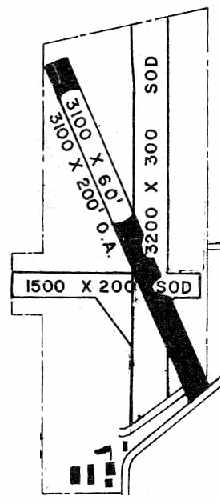
- IATA: none; ICAO: none

Summary
- Airport type: Public
- Operator: Wooster Aviation Center
- Location: Wooster, Ohio
- Interactive map of Wooster Municipal Airport

Runways
Direction	Length		Surface
Direction	ft	m	Surface
NW/SE	3,100	945	Asphalt
E/W	1,500	457	Sod
N/S	3,200	975	Sod

The Wooster Municipal Airport was a general aviation airport serving Wooster, Ohio, USA. It was built in the 1920s and was closed sometime between 1968 and 1972 and was replaced by Wayne County Airport 3 miles away on North Honeytown Road near Smithville, Ohio. The airport originally had sod runways but received a 3,100 foot paved runway in the 1950s. After closing, the runway was retained as a city street, now named Old Airport Road in Wooster.

== Accidents and incidents ==
- April 14, 1937: A privately operated Taylor Cub plane took off in poor weather conditions and lacking sufficient power to maintain control. The aircraft crashed a mile from the airport, seriously injuring its two occupants, Harry C. and Thomas B. George of Washington, D.C.
