= Mary Childs =

Mary Childs may refer to:

- Mary Ellen Childs (born 1957), American composer and multimedia artist
- Mary Louise Milliken Childs (1873–1936), American philanthropist
- Mary Childs (journalist), American journalist
- Mary Black (historian) (née Childs) (7 April 1922 – 1992), American historian

== See also ==
- Robert A. and Mary Childs House, historic residence in Hinsdale, Illinois
- Mary's Child, German fairytale
