= Stamberg =

Stamberg is a surname. Notable people with the surname include:

- Josh Stamberg (born 1970), American actor
- Susan Stamberg (1938–2025), American radio journalist
