= Wayne County Airport (Ohio) =

- IATA: BJJ; ICAO: KBJJ; FAA LID: BJJ

Summary
- Airport type: Public
- Owner: Wayne County
- Serves: Wayne County, Ohio
- Location: Wooster, Ohio
- Opened: November 1, 1968
- Elevation AMSL: 1,136 ft (346 m)
- Coordinates: 40°52′29″N 081°53′18″W

Map
- Location of airport in Ohio BJJ (the United States)

Runways
Direction	Length		Surface
Direction	ft	m	Surface
10/28	5,189	1,582	Asphalt

Statistics (2022)
- Aircraft operations (year ending 9/16/2022): 18,300
- Based aircraft: 48
- Source: Federal Aviation Administration

Wayne County Airport (IATA: BJJ, ICAO: KBJJ, FAA LID: BJJ) (Note: The airport formerly used the FAA location identifiers MFO and OTR.) is a public airport located six miles (10 km) northeast of the central business district of Wooster, a city in Wayne County, Ohio, United States. It is owned by Wayne County. Prior to the Wayne County Airport's construction sometime after 1972, the city of Wooster was served by Wooster Municipal Airport 3 miles southwest of the current Wayne County Airport.

Air ambulance services, flight instruction, and aircraft rental are all available at the airport.

== History ==
The airport authority announced in October 1966 that it would begin evaluating potential sites. A 325-acre (132 ha) site near Smithville had been selected by late December. Construction on the airport, including a 4,350-foot (1,330 m) runway, began in late July 1967. By late August 1968, runway paving was nearly finished and a new hangar had been built. Although the formal dedication did not occur until 30 August 1970, the airport opened 1 November 1968. It replaced the earlier Wooster Municipal Airport, with the fixed-base operator there, Aerodynamics, Inc., moving to the new location.

By early November 1987, a fixed-base operator called Mid Ohio Aviation was located at the airport.

The airport operator asked for financial assistance to remove underground fuel tanks in 1998.

A LifeFlight medical helicopter was based at the airport by late October 2010.

== Facilities and aircraft ==
Wayne County Airport covers an area of 331 acres (134 ha) and contains one asphalt paved runway (10/28) measuring 5,190 x 100 ft (1,582 x 30 m).

The airport has a fixed-base operator that sells both avgas and jet fuel. It offers services such as oxygen, catering, hangars, and courtesy and rental cars; it also offers amenities such as WiFi, conference rooms, pilot supplies, a crew lounge, snooze rooms, showers, and televisions.

For the 12-month period ending September 16, 2022, the airport had 18,300 aircraft operations, an average of 50 per day: 98% general aviation, 1% air taxi and <1% military. In September 2022, there were 48 aircraft based at this airport: 35 single-engine, 3 multi-engine, 5 jet and 5 helicopter.

== Accidents & Incidents ==
- On July 29, 2000, a homebuilt Zodiac CH 601 was destroyed during an approach to Wayne County Airport. According to a witness, the airplane flew around the airport and entered a left traffic pattern for landing on Runway 28. When the airplane was turning from base onto final, the witness saw it "stall and start a spin to the left"; though the witness reported that the pilot initially recovered, the nose remained high, and the aircraft stalled again and fell out of sight. Computations made by an FAA inspector revealed that the center of gravity was aft of the rearward limit by 3.13 inches, and the airplane was 21.5 pounds over maximum gross weight at the time of the accident. The probable cause of the accident was found to be the pilot's loss of control of the airplane while turning from base onto final, which resulted in an inadvertent stall/spin. A factor was the pilot's improper loading of the airplane, outside the weight and balance limitations.
- On November 9, 2003, two Cessna 150 aircraft collided at the Wayne County Airport. One was landing and the other departed. One aircraft was on final approach when they heard another aircraft make a radio call reporting on a close-in approach of its own. While lifting off from a touch-and-go landing, the pilots of the first aircraft heard a loud bank and felt a shutter; the aircraft aborted the takeoff and exited the runway, where it noted damage from the second aircraft. The pilot of the second aircraft reported extending the base leg of her traffic pattern and turning inbound when the preceding airplane landed. She later recalled mistaking the airplane she saw for the airplane she eventually struck. The probable cause of the accident was found to be the inadequate visual lookout of the student pilot of the second Cessna 150, causing an on-ground collision.
- On September 9, 2010, an experimental Robertson Velocity crashed while setting up to land at the Wayne County Airport. The pilot reported that the fuel system's sight gauges indicated 25 gallons remaining, but no visual check was conducted. Upon reaching the Wayne County Airport, the pilot made a low pass over the runway and departed again to let another aircraft land. While circling 5 miles from the airport, the aircraft's engine lost power, and the pilot began a glide back toward the airport. The pilot then realized he did not have enough altitude to glide back and landed in a field nearby. Post accident inspection of the airplane revealed the fuel tanks were intact and there was no fuel present either in the tanks or on the ground around the wreckage. The probable cause of the accident was found to be a loss of engine power due to fuel exhaustion as a result of the pilot's inadequate fuel planning.

== See also ==
- List of airports in Ohio
