= Green Local Schools (Wayne County) =

School district in Ohio

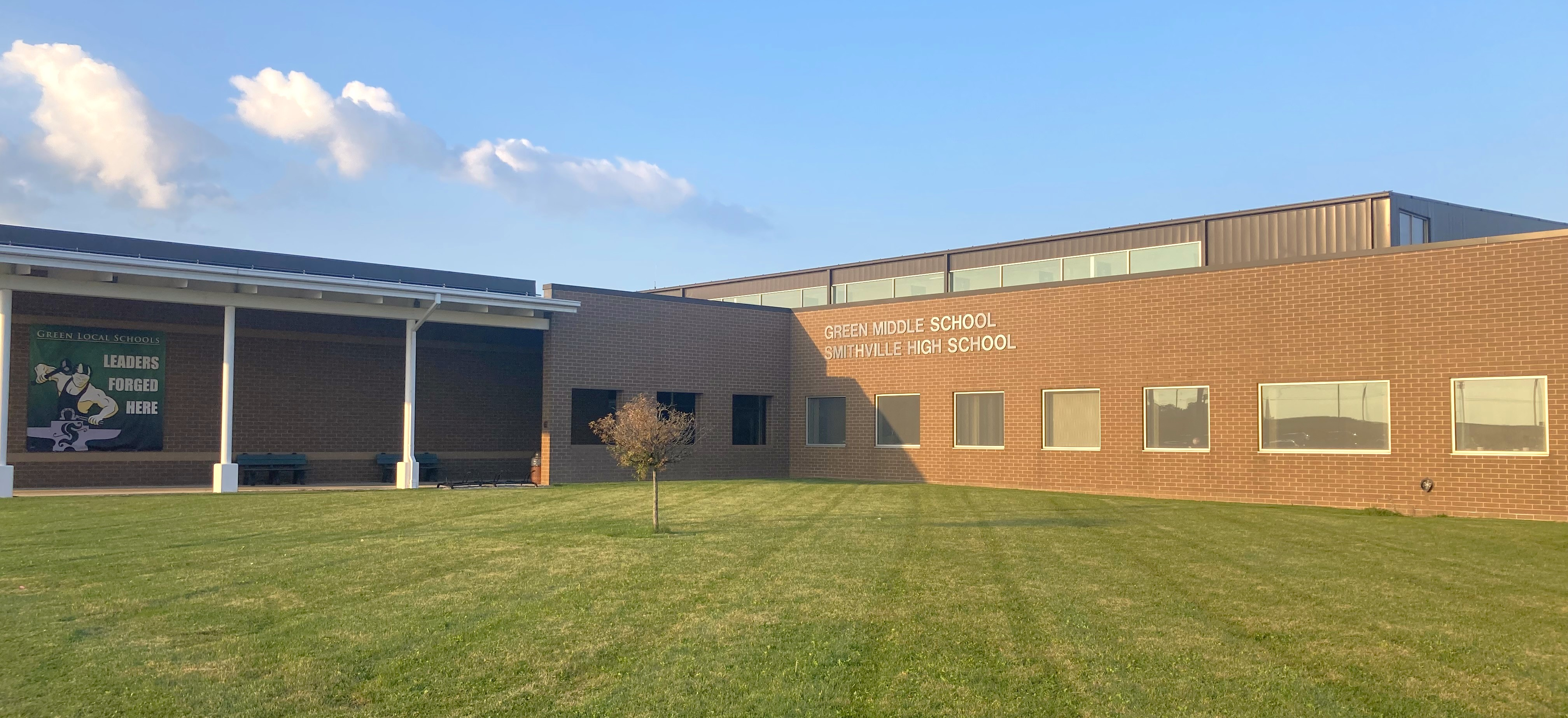

Location
- Smithville, Ohio
- Coordinates: 40°52′04.3″N 81°51′21.5″W

District information
- Type: Public
- Grades: K-12
- Superintendent: Dean Frank
- Schools: 3

Students and staff
- Students: 1,017
- Teachers: 81
- Athletic conference: Wayne County Athletic League
- District mascot: Smithie
- Colors: Green & White

Other information
- Website: green-local.k12.oh.us

Green Local Schools is a school district serving portions of central Wayne County, Ohio, including Smithville and Marshallville. The district's superintendent is the 2017 Ohio Principal of the Year Dean Frank.

== Schools ==
- Smithville High School (grades 9 through 12)
- Green Middle School (grades 6 through 8)
- Green Elementary School (grades K through 5)

All three schools share one combined school building located in Smithville, which was completed in 2014. The K-12 building simultaneously replaced all four school buildings which were then in use: Smithville Elementary School, Marshallville Elementary School, Greene Middle School, and the old Smithville High School.

== Demographics ==
As of the 2020/21 school year, 1,062 students attend Green Local Schools. The majority of the students are white (91.1%). Approximately 9.3% of the students have disabilities and 24.2% of students are economically disadvantaged. As of the 2015/16 school year, the district has an attendance rate of 96.8%. With approximately 81.5 teachers in the district, the average student-to-teacher ratio is about 12.5 to 1. Teachers have an average salary of $51,991 with an average teaching experience of 5 years.
