= Smithville High School (Ohio) =

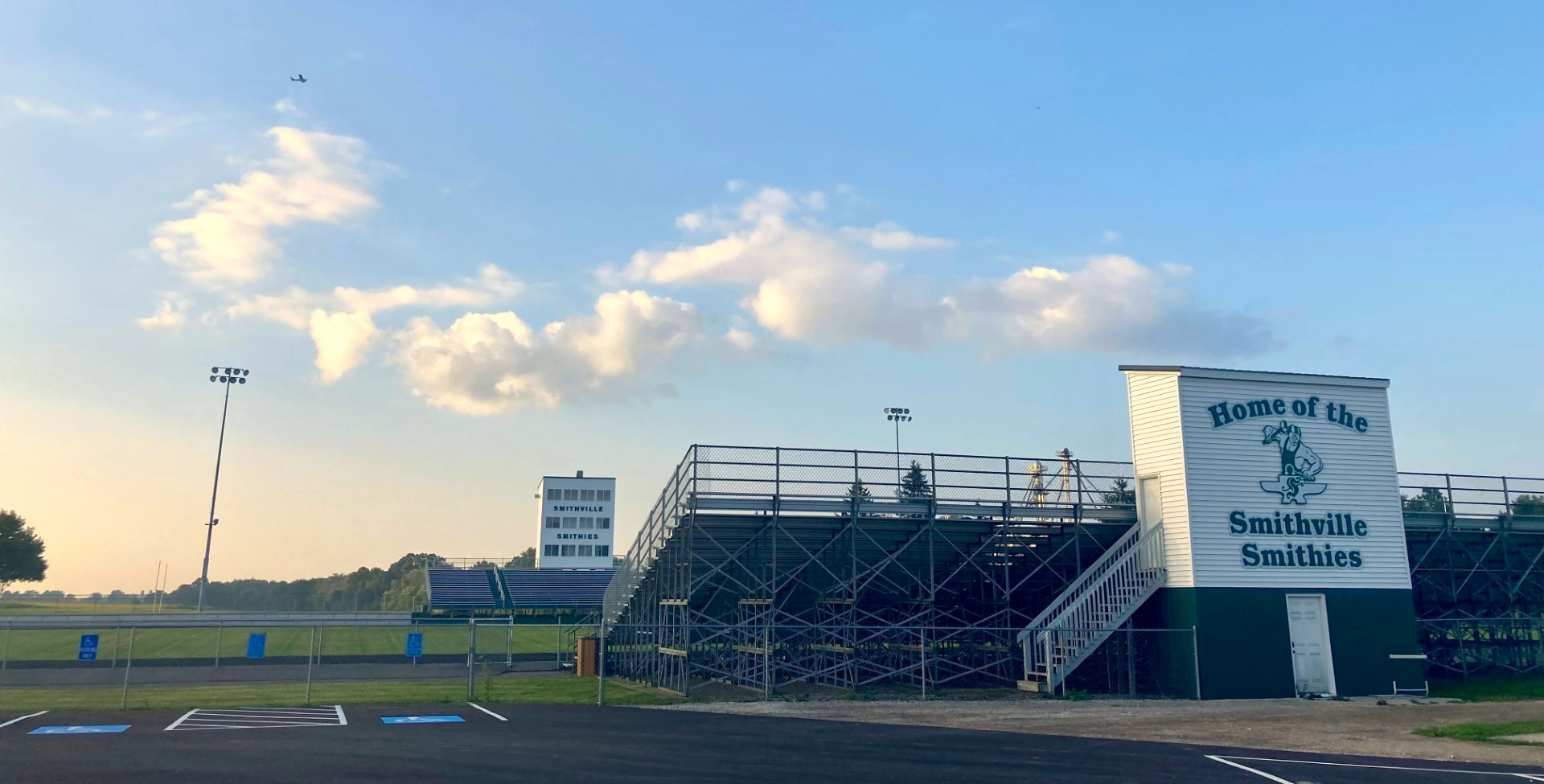
- Smithville High School Football Stadium

Location
- 200 Smithie Drive; Smithville, Wayne, Ohio 44677; United States
- Coordinates: 40°52′07″N 81°51′28″W

Information
- Type: Public, Co-Ed
- School district: Green Local School District
- Superintendent: Dean Frank
- Principal: Andy Bratcher
- Teaching staff: 17.75 (FTE)
- Grades: 9-12
- Student to teacher ratio: 18.65
- Colors: Green & White
- Fight song: College Boy
- Athletics conference: Wayne County Athletic League
- Mascot: Smithie
- Nickname: Smithies
- Website: https://hs.green-local.k12.oh.us/

Smithville High School is a public high school in Smithville, Ohio. It is the only high school in the Green Local Schools district. Their nickname is the Smithies, which was a nickname given to the school's teams by an early sports editor of the Wooster Daily Record. The colors of green and white came from the town's location within Green Township. Long-time athletic director and coach Wilbur Berkey designed the horseshoe and anvil logo the school uses.

In 1955, Marshallville's district was merged with Smithville's. This was done in order to prevent the transporting of Marshallville students across Orrville's district into Dalton, where Marshallville had sent their students since their school's closure in 1938. The merger enabled Smithville to start up a football program in the Wayne County Athletic League. The Marshallville Tigers had previously competed in the WCAL as well.

Due to the historical success of all three teams in the WCAL, Smithville's football team has a strong rivalry with both the Dalton High School Bulldogs and the Waynedale High School Golden Bears. The three schools combined either had a share in or won outright the WCAL football title 42 times in the 51 seasons from 1959 to 2009.

In 2014, Smithville High School, Greene Middle School, Smithville Elementary and Marshallville Elementary were all combined into one new K-12 building, and the old buildings demolished.
