= Madeline K. Sofia =

American science podcaster

- Education: University of Rochester Medical Center (PhD); University of Mount Union (BS)
- Known for: science journalism

Madeline K. Sofia (/səˈfaɪə/), also known as Maddie Sofia, is an American journalist and science communicator. They co-hosted Short Wave, NPR's daily science podcast from 2019 to 2021, and currently teach science coommunication workshops and do mentoring.

== Education ==
Sofia earned their PhD in microbiology from the University of Rochester Medical Center. Prior to graduate school, they earned a BS in biology at the University of Mount Union.

== Career ==
Sofia began reporting for NPR in 2016. In October 2019, they became the founding co-host of Short Wave, a science podcast from NPR.

On June 14, 2021, it was announced that Maddie Sofia would be leaving Short Wave in the fall of the same year.

Prior to beginning their work on Short Wave, Sofia was an assistant producer and associate producer on the NPR Science Desk. Sofia collaborated with Joe Palca on an NPR program that trains young science communicators, NPR Scicommers (formerly known as Friends of Joe's Big Idea or FOJBI). They were also part of a special series, Maddie About Science, a series of seven videos about science.
