= Rittman High School =

Public school in Rittman, Ohio, United States

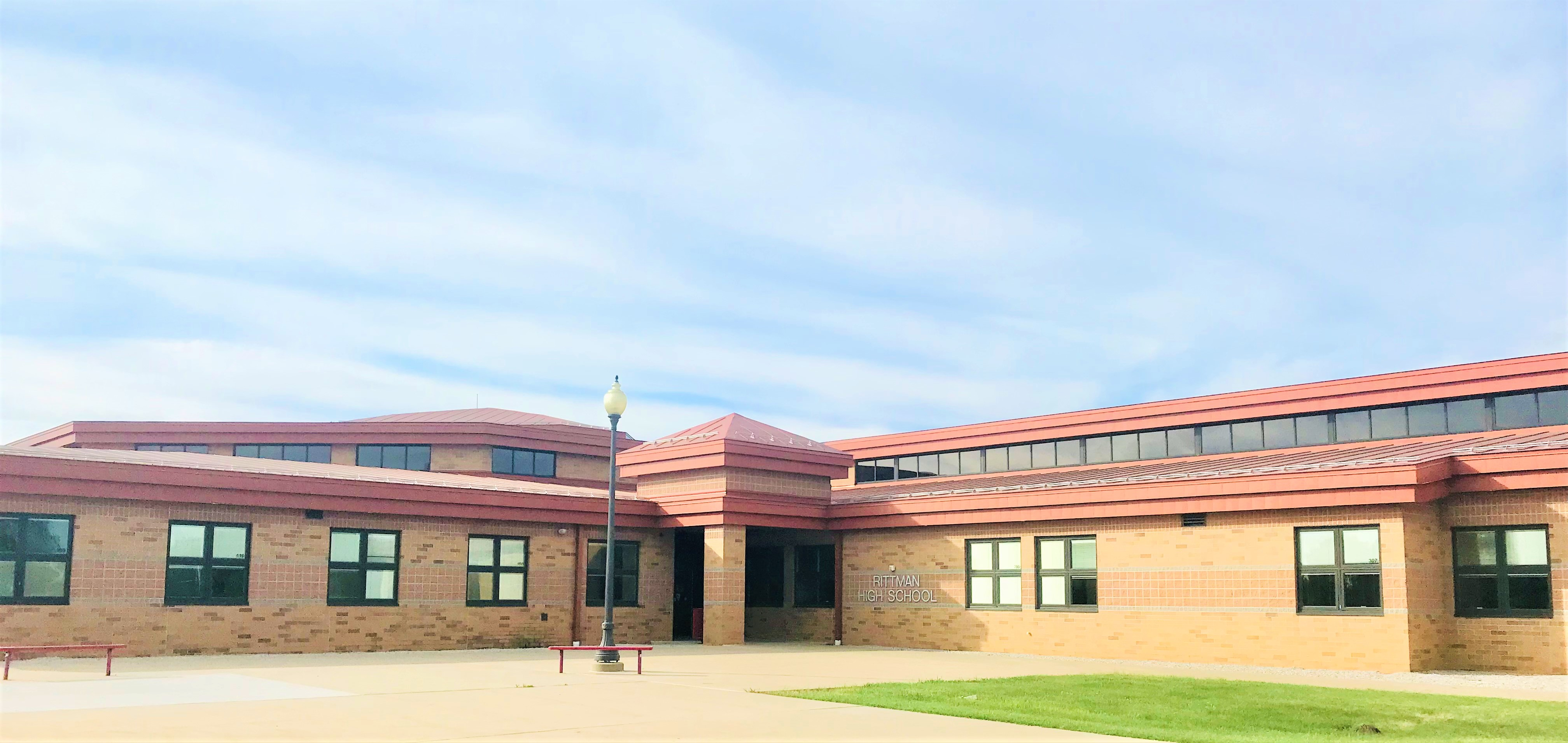

Location
- 100 Saurer Street; Rittman, Wayne County, Ohio 44270; United States; 40°58′31″N 81°47′46″W

Information
- Type: Public, Co-Ed
- School district: Rittman Exempted Village Schools
- Superintendent: John Ritchie
- Principal: Nicholas Evans
- Teaching staff: 17.07 (FTE)
- Grades: 9-12
- Student to teacher ratio: 14.18
- Hours in school day: 7
- Colors: Red, White, & Black
- Athletics conference: Wayne County Athletic League
- Mascot: Indian
- Nickname: Indians
- Rival: Chippewa High School Chipps
- Website: Official website

Rittman High School is a public high school in Rittman, Ohio, United States. It is the only high school in the Rittman Exempted Village Schools district. They are nicknamed the "Indians", which comes from the old Rittman Chippewa Salt Company's (now known as Morton Salt Company) logo of a Native American's head. Red and white were the school colors until 1940 when black was added.

A new high school was built and opened in 2011 on the same property as the previous building.

Rittman's football rivalry with the Chippewa High School Chipps is the longest-running uninterrupted rivalry in Wayne County, having met every year since 1923. The football rivalry with the Dalton High School Bulldogs is also the fourth most-played rivalry in Wayne County as well.

== Sex Scandal ==
In 2009, a female teacher at the school was involved in a nationally covered sex scandal and charged with sexual battery involving two male students, ages 17 and 18. In late 2008, the school received notice that the parents of the first student were suspicious of the contact between the teacher and student. The school was investigating internally to see if the claims were warranted. Then, in early 2009, the family of the second student contacted the school and filed a complaint that the student confirmed an inappropriate relationship was taking place. The same day, Erin Speicher, then 34, resigned from her position as a ninth-grade English teacher at Rittman High School. She taught at the school for 12 years. Speicher was arrested and was being held on a $75,000 cash bond at the Wayne County Jail. Speicher engaged in sexual conduct with one student in June 2008 and again sometime between August and October. She engaged in sexual conduct with a second student five times in January 2009, according to the indictment. She pleaded guilty to a seven-count indictment of sexual battery in Wayne County Common Pleas Court and was sentenced to four years in prison. Speicher, who was married (currently divorced) with two young children at the time, is quoted as saying to the court "As a result of my actions I will never teach again, and I love teaching. Last week I taught my 4-year-old and my 3-year-old the words, 'correctional facility,' to explain that is where I may have to live for a while. ... But I also kept thinking that if my sons were the victims in this case, I know I would want that teacher punished." Speicher's attorney, Norman Miller, said she was remorseful for her actions, and had sought counseling. Upon release from prison, Speicher will be classified as a Tier 3 sex offender, which comes with a lifetime registry.

=== Community response ===
After Speicher was sentenced, many supporters from the community thought she was sentenced harshly. Because of the second student being a legal adult and both students being over the age of consent in Ohio (16 years of age), they felt the four-year prison sentence was unjust and lengthy. Speicher was charged because of her position of power as an educational instructor, even though during the affairs, she was not either students teacher. Many believe that Speicher was simply used as an example to be set in the community.

== Further Scandal Involvement ==
In 2013, the school was involved in a scandal surrounding the football team. While completing an assignment for his junior composition class, a Junior member of the varsity football team wrote a controversial poem about the favoritism and nepotism being displayed by the football team. In response to the poem, the coach, whose son is on the team, and is perceived to be benefiting from his father's position, took drastic measures, ensuring that the student was removed from the football team and convincing the principal to suspend the student from classes for four days. Although this is a clear violation of the student's First Amendment rights, the district did little to respond. The punishment garnered widespread media attention. Shortly after the increased media pressure, the district intervened and overturned the punishment. It is unknown as to what type of reception the student will receive when he returns to his team, as the coach who brought on this unwarranted punishment has had no repercussions. This case shines light on the problems of conflicts of interest and politics in high school athletics.
