= Jasmine Garsd =

Argentinian-American reporter

- Born: Buenos Aires, Argentina
- Education: University of California, Berkeley
- Occupation: Journalist

Jasmine Garsd is an Argentine-American journalist based in New York. She currently covers criminal justice and immigration for NPR.

Garsd co-founded NPR's Alt.Latino with Felix Contreras in 2010, and co-hosted the program from 2010 to 2016. The show focuses on Latinx culture and Latin alternative music.

In 2022, during the 2022 FIFA World Cup, Garsd hosted The Last Cup, a limited series podcast from NPR about Argentine footballer Lionel Messi that examines identity, immigration, race and capitalism. The program is available in both English and Spanish.
