= Stacey Vanek Smith =

American journalist (born 26 December 1976)

- Born: 26 December 1976 (age 49)
- Occupations: Correspondent, TV news host, educator
- Employer: National Public Radio

Stacey Vanek Smith (born 26 December 1976) is an American journalist who is a senior writer for Bloomberg Businessweek. She previously hosted the NPR podcasts Planet Money and The Indicator.

== Early life and education ==
Vanek Smith was born and raised in Boise, Idaho and on her parents’ cattle ranch in Ola, Idaho. She holds a B.A. from Princeton University (1999), and an Master of Journalism from the Columbia Journalism School.

Vanek Smith has served as the Ferris visiting professor of journalism at Princeton University in 2019 and 2021.

== Career ==
Vanek Smith began working for Marketplace in 2003. She joined NPR in 2014 and began cohosting Planet Money podcast. In 2017, Vanek Smith hosted All Things Considered during the Charlottesville Unite the Right rally. In 2018, she cofounded the daily spin-off podcast The Indicator from Planet Money.

Vanek Smith joined Bloomberg Businessweek as a senior writer in 2021. She co-hosts the Everybody's Business podcast with Max Chafkin.

== Books ==
- Machiavelli For Women. Simon & Schuster. 7 September 2021. ISBN 978-1-7971-0804-9.
