= Dale Willman =

American journalist (born 1956)

Dale Willman (born 1956, Jamestown, New York, United States) is an American journalist. He is currently a newscaster for NPR. Prior to that, he worked for the Earth Institute of Columbia University, where he offered training for journalists. From 2017 until 2020, he was a program manager in the Craig Newmark Graduate School of Journalism at CUNY, where he ran a climate resilience fellowship for journalists. He returned in June 2016 from South Sudan, where he served as Lead Trainer and Civic Education Advisor for Internews. While there he worked with journalists at Radio Mayardit in Turalei, South Sudan.

In 2010 to 2011, Willman was a Fulbright Program grantee. He was the co-founder, co-publisher and managing editor of Saratoga Wire, a full-service on-line newspaper serving Saratoga Springs, New York until May 2014. Willman formerly produced podcasts for Slate; and he has been an adjunct professor at Skidmore College in Saratoga Springs, New York. He has worked for NPR (National Public Radio) for more than 20 years as a news anchor, reporter, producer and editor. He has also worked for CBS and CNN, and has anchored news for WCBS (AM) in New York and WTOP-FM (formerly WTOP-AM) in Washington, D.C.

The focus of his Fulbright was noted British naturalist Alfred Russel Wallace and Wallace's work in what is now Indonesia and Malaysia. Willman spent 10 months in Indonesia teaching journalism and researching Wallace, the most prominent naturalist of the 19th century. Wallace is considered the father of the scientific discipline now known as Biogeography.

== Background ==
Born in Jamestown, New York, Willman grew up in Ohio, first in Oberlin but in his teens his family moved to Smithville, where he graduated from high school. Willman began his broadcasting career in Wooster, Ohio at WWST AM-FM when he was 17. After a year in Wooster, he moved on to radio stations in Canton and Steubenville, Ohio before spending almost ten years in Columbus, Ohio. In 1986, he moved to Washington D.C., where he began working as a production assistant on National Public Radio’s Morning Edition. He later served as a newscaster, special events anchor, editor and producer during his years working at NPR.

When the first Gulf War began in January 1991, Willman provided newscasts from London for NPR for several months. These were the only newscasts ever produced by NPR to have originated from another country. While in London he also reported on several attacks by the Irish Republican Army, most notably their attack on No. 10 Downing Street. His London newscasts were cited in NPR’s receipt of the 1991 Alfred I. duPont–Columbia University Award for Excellence in Broadcast Journalism. Willman also shared in a Peabody Award as producer of the most popular entry in the public radio series, Lost and Found Sound, broadcast by NPR's All Things Considered. The story focused on CKLW.

In 1991, Willman became morning host for Monitor Radio. His work was carried by more than 200 radio stations in the U.S., and was heard on shortwave radio around the world. In 1993 he left Monitor over a highly publicized ethical dispute.

During the 1990s, Willman worked periodically as a producer and correspondent for the CBS Radio Stations News Service (RSNS – now defunct) based in Washington, DC. While with CBS he produced coverage of the Bush-Gorbachev Summit in Washington D.C. He also produced coverage of the Oklahoma bombing of the Murrow Federal Office Building in Oklahoma City.

Willman was a national correspondent and environmental reporter for CNN Radio from 1996 to 1998. While there he won an Edward R. Murrow Award (national) for Investigative Reporting given by the Radio-Television Digital News Association (formerly RTNDA) for a series entitled “Broadway’s Dirty Little Secret.” The series documented the exposure to potentially toxic chemicals received by musicians performing nightly during the play, “Beauty and the Beast.” Willman was the only environmental reporter for CNN Radio in the network’s history. While at CNN he also anchored the network’s political convention coverage, and produced a series of stories in the run-up to the 1998 national election during a 12-state road trip across Middle America.

In December 2009, a book in which Willman authored a chapter was released. Climate Change Science and Policy was published by Island Press. Willman’s chapter details the role of the media in covering climate. Willman also contributed to the Encyclopedia of Climate and Weather, 2nd Edition, published in March 2011 by Oxford University Press.

More recently, Willman spent a year in South Sudan working for Internews. When he left the country in June 2016, he was Lead Trainer/Civic Education Advisor for the company's efforts there.

== Education ==
Willman received his bachelor's degree in International Relations from The Ohio State University and his master's degree in Environment and Community from Antioch University in Seattle. He has a certificate in Environmental Law and Policy from the USDA Graduate School in Washington, DC. In 2008, Willman was a fellow in the Science Literacy Project from Sound Visions Productions. In 2004 he was a Metcalf Fellow at the University of Rhode Island, and in 1999 he participated in the Institute for Journalism and Natural Resources in Missoula Montana.

Willman was named the Distinguished Alumnus for Antioch-Seattle’s June, 2010 graduation.

== Public service ==
Today Willman lives in upstate New York, where he is a member of LASAR, the Lower Adirondacks Search and Rescue team. He is involved with journalism training in a number of countries, including Zambia and Malawi, where he introduced social communication software called FrontlineSMS to journalists.
