= Jacob Goldstein =

American financial journalist

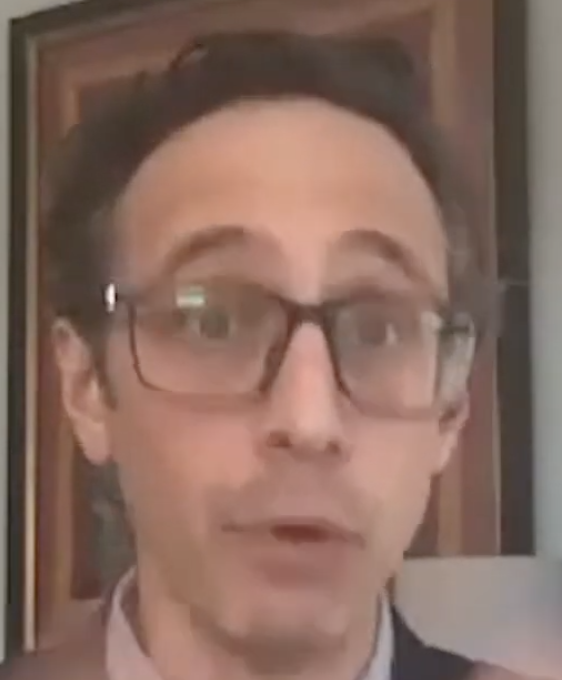
- Goldstein in 2021
- Born: Jacob Goldstein
- Education: Stanford University, Columbia University
- Occupations: Non-fiction writer, Journalist
- Writing career
- Notable work: Money: The True Story of a Made-Up Thing (2020)

Jacob Goldstein is an American journalist, writer, and podcast host. He graduated from Stanford University with a bachelor's degree in English and from Columbia University with a master's degree in journalism. He has reported for The Wall Street Journal, the Miami Herald, and the Bozeman Daily Chronicle. He has also written for The New York Times Magazine. He was a correspondent and a co-host of the NPR podcast Planet Money and is also the author of the 2020 book, Money: The True Story of a Made-Up Thing. He now hosts the podcast What's Your Problem.

== Bibliography ==
- Jacob Goldstein (September 2020). Money: The True Story of a Made-Up Thing. New York: Hachette Books. ISBN 978-0-316-41719-8.
