= Mary Childs (journalist) =

American financial journalist

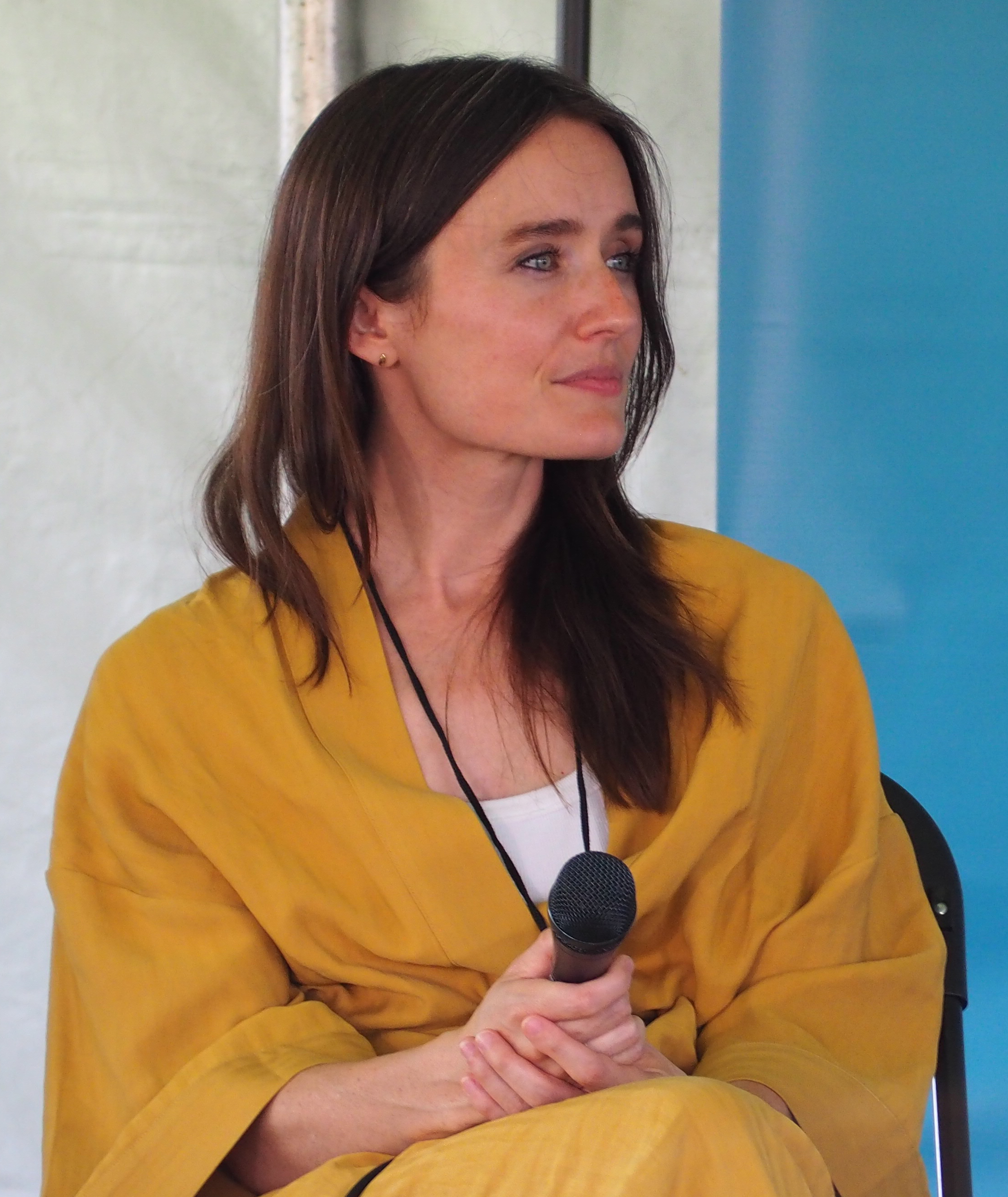
- Childs at 2022 Gaithersburg Book Festival
- Born: Richmond, Virginia
- Education: Washington and Lee University
- Occupations: Financial journalist and author
- Known for: Host of Mary in America
- Notable work: The Bond King (2022)
- Spouse: Scott Lane (m. 2017)
- Website: marychilds.com maryinamerica.com

Mary Childs is an American financial journalist, author, and host of the talk show podcast Mary in America. She is known for writing The Bond King (2022), a biography of retired investor Bill H. Gross.

== Early life ==
Mary Dryden Childs was raised in Richmond, Virginia. Her father Eugene M. Childs Jr. was a project director at Union Bank & Trust, and Margaret Noftsinger Childs taught at St. Catherine's School, which Mary attended. Childs attended Washington and Lee University, and in 2006 studied at St. Stephen's College, Delhi. She graduated from Washington and Lee with a degree in business journalism in 2008. She wrote her honors thesis on the use of media sting operations in India and the United States.

While at Washington and Lee, she wrote for The Trident student newspaper and was editor-at-large of InGeneral. She was also a member of Kappa Kappa Gamma. Childs was a Thomas J. Watson Fellow in 2008–2009, and travelled internationally to complete her "The Eye of the Beholder: The Cartography of Faces" project.

== Career ==
=== Bloomberg News ===
In 2009, Childs joined Bloomberg News as a print, television, and radio reporter, where she later befriended fellow financial reporter Matt Levine. While at Bloomberg, Childs became notable as a prominent financial reporter. Together with Stephanie Ruhle and Bradley Keoun, she broke the story of Bruno Iksil, nicknamed "the London Whale", and his involvement in the 2012 JPMorgan Chase trading loss.

She was a finalist for the Gerald Loeb Award in 2013. Childs' article "Blackstone Unit Wins in No-Lose Codere Trade" was included in The New Yorker's list of "The Best Business Journalism of 2013", and was the subject of an episode of The Daily Show.

In 2014, she received a general excellence award from the Society for Advancing Business Editing and Writing. She received the Tribeca Disruptive Innovation Award in 2015.

=== Financial Times, Barron's, and Planet Money ===
Childs was the United States financial correspondent for the Financial Times until 2017. She also contributed to publications such as Harper's Magazine, and The New York Times, where she broke the news that Bill H. Gross had reached a settlement in his lawsuit against PIMCO, the company he co-founded. She completed a trip to China and Hong Kong in 2018 as part of the East–West Center's exchange program.

She was a senior reporter for Barron's until 2019, when she became the co-host of NPR's Planet Money, which she hosted until 2026.

In 2022, she was nominated for the Gerald Loeb Award for her coverage of investment in mobile home parks, and received a Gracie Award for her coverage of the Indian farmers' protest. Childs received the Arthur F. Burns fellowship from the International Center for Journalists in 2023.

=== The Bond King (2022) ===
In 2022, she published The Bond King, a biography of Bill H. Gross, through Flatiron Books. The book received positive reviews from critics. James B. Stewart of The New York Times called it "admirably thorough", praising Childs' research and writing. James Grant of The Wall Street Journal praised its entertaining and detailed examination of Gross' life. It was included on several year-end best of lists, including Literary Hub, The New York Times, and Investopedia.

=== Mary in America ===
Childs is the host of the podcast Mary in America, which was launched in 2026. The podcast airs weekly and follows a talk show format based around interviews with guests, such as economist Alvin E. Roth and author Xochitl Gonzalez. She also writes the newsletter off the run.

== Personal life ==
In 2017, she married music producer and musician Scott Lane. Childs wore a wedding veil previously worn by her mother and grandmother, as well as a 1962 wedding gown worn by her mother's cousin. They first met in 2001 while attending high school, but did not enter a relationship until 2014. They reside in Virginia with their children.

== Books ==
- The Bond King: How One Man Made a Market, Built an Empire, and Lost It All. New York, NY: Flatiron Books. 2022. ISBN 978-1-250-12084-7.
