= Chippewa High School =

Coordinates: 40.964454°N 81.704149°W

Chippewa Junior/Senior High School
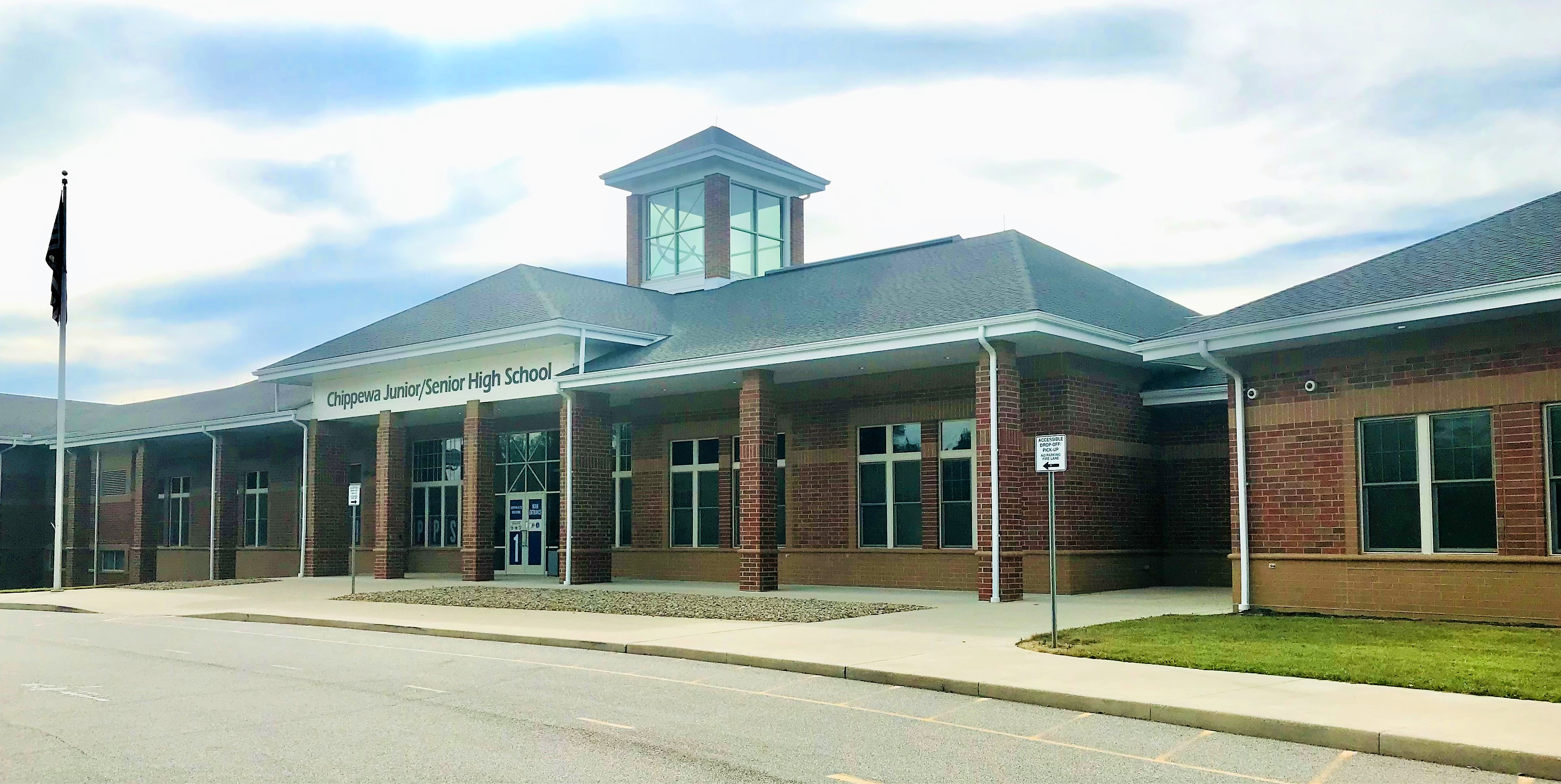

Location
- 466 South Portage Street; Doylestown, Ohio 44230; United States

Information
- School district: Chippewa Local Schools
- CEEB code: 361985
- Principal: Jud Hartman
- Grades: 7-12
- Enrollment: 588 (2023–2024)
- Language: English
- Campus: Chippewa Jr./Sr. High School
- Colors: Blue & White
- Athletics conference: Wayne County Athletic League (WCAL)
- Team name: Chipps
- Rival: Rittman High School Indians
- Website: https://www.chippewaschools.org/

Chippewa High School, officially Chippewa Junior/Senior High School, is a public high school in Doylestown, Ohio. It is the only high school in the Chippewa Local Schools district. Their nickname is the Chipps.

== History ==
The school was known as Doylestown High School after the Doylestown and Chippewa Township districts merged in 1917. The name change reflected the trend that most of the district's residents lived within Chippewa Township and not within Doylestown's limits. This is also when they shortened their nickname to the "Chipps", as they felt it was redundant to call themselves the "Chippewa Chippewas". The newest building opened in 2018, with a square footage of 110,000, a performing arts center, and a gymnasium floor decorated with a silhouette mural of Doylestown's landmarks.

Chippewa's football rivalry with the Rittman High School Indians is the longest-running uninterrupted rivalry in Wayne County, having met every year since 1923. The two rival high schools compete for the "Big Chief Trophy.". Their football rivalry with Dalton High School Bulldogs is the second-longest in the county and has been played every year since 1925 with the exception of three years in the 1940s when Dalton didn't field a team.

Chippewa is one of eight schools that participate in the Wayne County Athletic League.

=== Ohio High School Athletic Association State Championships ===
- Girls Track and Field – 1975

=== Ohio High School Athletic Association State Runner-up ===
- Girls Basketball - 1994, 2023
- Girls Soccer – 2005, 2015, 2024, 2025

== Notable alumni ==
- Denny Galehouse (MLB Pitcher)
