= Rough Translation =

NPR podcast

Presentation
- Hosted by: Gregory Warner
- Genre: Culture
- Language: English

Publication
- Original release: 14 August 2017
- Provider: NPR

Rough Translation is an American podcast from NPR that tells stories from around the world that have relevance to a U.S. audience. It debuted in 2017 and was hosted by Gregory Warner, a former NPR foreign correspondent. It was canceled by NPR in 2023.

== Program ==
NPR describes the program as "a podcast that tells stories from far off places that hit close to home."

The first season had seven episodes, and the second an additional five. The third season, the first to have an explicit theme, was about rebels and had 26 episodes. The fourth season, about scandal, had seven episodes. The fifth season, about cultural identity, had eight episodes. The sixth season began with a seven-part series about the civilian-military cultural divide. It continued through April 2022. The seventh season, about work culture, began in June 2022.

== Reception ==
The podcast has received positive critical reception.
