= Dave Davies (reporter) =

American journalist

- Born: February 14, 1953 (age 73); Texas, U.S
- Education: University of Texas (BA)
- Occupations: Journalist, Radio host
- Notable credit: National Public Radio

Dave Davies (born February 14, 1953) is an American print and broadcast journalist.

== Early life and education ==
Davies was born in Texas. He graduated from the University of Texas in 1975.

== Career ==
For 25 years, Davies was a reporter and columnist on government and politics for the Philadelphia Daily News. From 1982 to 1986, he covered City Hall and other beats and served as news director for one year.

Davies became a senior reporter at public radio station WHYY-FM in 2010. He covers the Philadelphia government and politics and produces enterprise reports on emerging city and regional issues for WHYY's multimedia news outlets. His blog, Off Mic, is featured on WHYY's NewsWorks.org. Davies is also a regular fill-in host for Terry Gross on NPR’s Fresh Air, heard on more than 500 public radio stations. He has also substituted for Marty Moss-Coane on WHYY-FM's Radio Times.

In 2003, he was offered the post of press secretary to Pennsylvania Governor Ed Rendell. Davies accepted but reversed his decision and declined the post the following week.

Davies has also worked for the radio station KYW in Philadelphia as City Hall bureau chief.

== See also ==
- List of National Public Radio personnel
