= Cheryl W. Thompson =

American journalist

Cheryl W. Thompson is an American investigative correspondent for National Public Radio and a former investigative reporter with The Washington Post. She is also an associate professor of journalism at George Washington University.

In June 2018, Thompson was named the first African American president of Investigative Reporters and Editors (IRE) and re-elected in 2019 for a second term and won an unprecedented third term in 2020. In 2011, an adaption of Thompson's story "A Cop Killer’s Remorse" won a regional Emmy Award.

== Works ==
- Forgotten Souls: The Search for the Lost Tuskegee Airmen. Dafina, 2026. ISBN 978-1-4967-5077-8
