= Kirk Siegler =

Journalist for NPR since 2012

- Education: University of Colorado Boulder
- Occupation: Journalist
- Years active: 2003–present
- Organization: National Public Radio

Kirk Siegler is an American journalist who has been working for National Public Radio (NPR) since 2012. His stories are regularly featured on Morning Edition and All Things Considered.

== Early life and education ==
Siegler grew up outside Missoula, Montana. After graduating from high school, he went to Boulder, Colorado, to attend University of Colorado Boulder and graduated with a B.A. in journalism.

== Career ==
Siegler briefly worked as a waiter in Sydney, Australia, before beginning his journalism career.

In 2003, he joined Montana Public Radio as the first State House bureau chief. Later, he moved to Aspen, Colorado, and spent seven years working at the NPR member station KUNC and Aspen Public Radio as a reporter and, later, as Aspen Public Radio's news director. He covered the ski industry, immigration and an energy boom in western Colorado involving a major dispute over fracking.

In 2012, Siegler received three Edward R. Murrow Awards from the Radio Television Digital News Association, for new documentary, breaking news, and sound categories.

In 2015, Johns Hopkins University awarded him an international reporting fellowship for his work on health and development in Nepal.

In 2019, Siegler helped open NPR's first bureau in Idaho which is based in Boise State Public Radio.

=== NPR ===
In December 2012, Siegler joined NPR's national desk and since then has been covering the western United States for NPR.

Siegler's reporting focuses on issues such as the environmental and economic impacts of the drought in California and the West. He also covers the region's land-use disputes. His assignments have included coverage of anti-government protests in the region, including an interview with Nevada rancher, Cliven Bundy, at his home outside Bunkerville, Nevada, in 2014.

Siegler has covered wildfires while working with a crew made up entirely of Native American from Arizona, seen and covered the aftermath of many of the most prominent mass shootings in American history, gone skiing with snowboarder and Protect our Winters founder Jeremy Jones, traveled by canoe to the Colombian jungles to report on the cacao industry, and gone down into a volcano. He also contributes extensively to the NPR's news coverage. His stories are regularly featured on Morning Edition and All Things Considered.

== Awards and recognition ==
- Edward R. Murrow Award (2012)
- Johns Hopkins University Fellowship (2015)
