= Wakeup Call (WBAI) =

Wakeup Call was a morning radio program produced in New York City by the WBAI station of the Pacifica Radio Network. Until its cancellation in August 2013, its final hosts were Esther Armah Monday to Thursday and Felipe Luciano on Fridays.
