= Michael D. Sullivan (journalist) =

American radio journalist

Michael D. Sullivan is the Senior Asia Correspondent for National Public Radio (NPR) based in Hanoi since 2003. Prior to that, Sullivan spent 6 years as the network's South Asia correspondent. Sullivan has received awards from the Overseas Press Club, South Asia Journalists Association, and, with Jennifer Ludden, Loren Jenkins, and Paul Glickman, won the 1998 Robert F. Kennedy Journalism Award for international radio. Sullivan has been at NPR since 1985.
