= Robert Smith (journalist, born 1967) =

American journalist (born 1967)

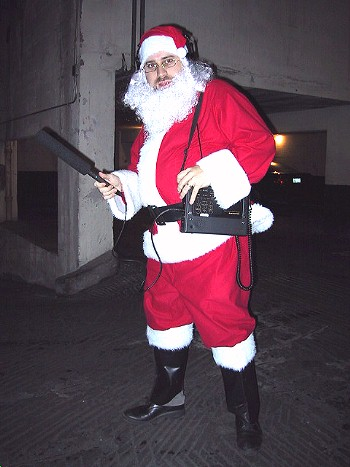
- Robert Smith dressed as Santa Claus
- Born: Robert Smith; 31 December 1967 (age 58); Park City, Utah, U.S.
- Education: Reed College; Columbia University
- Occupations: Correspondent, TV news host, educator
- Employer: National Public Radio

Robert Smith (born December 31, 1967) is an American journalist. He is best known for hosting the NPR podcast Planet Money. Smith is a professor of professional practice in journalism and director of the Knight-Bagehot Fellowship Program at Columbia University.

== Early life and education ==
Smith was born and raised in Park City, Utah. He holds a B.A. from Reed College (1989), where he worked at the campus radio station KRRC, and an M.B.A. from the Columbia Business School (2020). He also was a Knight-Bagehot fellow at the Columbia Journalism School (2018).

== Career ==
Smith began reporting for NPR in 1994. He got his start working at KPCW in Park City, Utah. He then worked at Portland, Oregon community radio station KBOO. He has also held reporting jobs at KUER in Salt Lake City, Utah, and KUOW-FM in Seattle, Washington. He won a Peabody Award in 2016 for his investigation into Wells Fargo and how they were punishing whistleblowers. He was part of NPR's political team covering elections including going on the campaign trail for presidential elections, and blogging about elections on the NPR website in 2006.

Smith is known for his coverage of eclectic and offbeat topics from participating in and reporting on Santarchy, to the life of Desi Arnaz to training for and reporting on the sport of curling. Talking about Planet Money, he says he likes to "make dull business news sparkle."

Smith has taught audio classes at Princeton University and radio/serialized podcast production classes at the Maine College of Art & Design. In 2021, he became the director of the Knight-Bagehot Fellowship in Economics and Business Journalism at Columbia University.
