= Susan Stamberg =

American radio journalist (1938–2025)

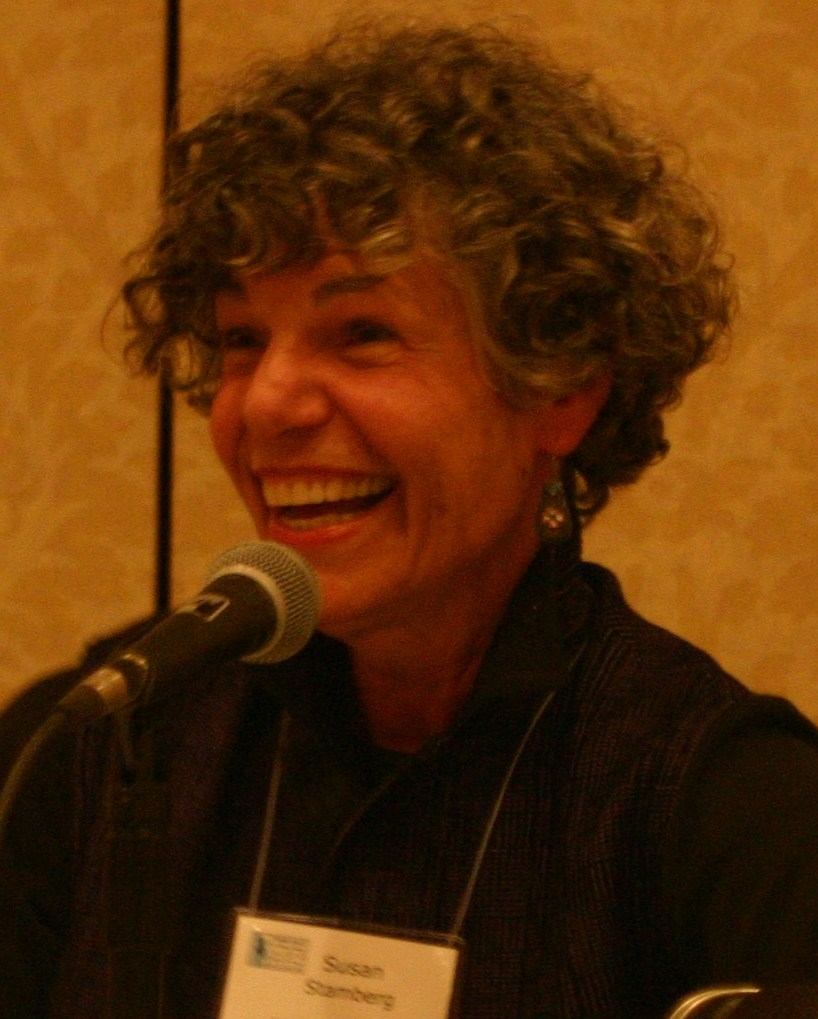
- Stamberg at the Third Coast Audio Festival on October 21, 2005
- Born: Susan Levitt; September 7, 1938; Newark, New Jersey, U.S.
- Died: October 16, 2025 (aged 87)
- Resting place: Rock Creek Cemetery
- Education: Barnard College (BA)
- Spouse: Louis C. Stamberg (m. 1962; died 2007)
- Children: Josh Stamberg
- Presenting career
- Show: All Things Considered; Weekend Edition Saturday
- Network: National Public Radio

Susan Phoebe Stamberg (née Levitt; September 7, 1938 – October 16, 2025) was an American radio journalist. She was co-host of NPR's flagship program All Things Considered from 1972 to 1986. In that role Stamberg was the first female host of a national news broadcast. She was considered one of NPR's "Founding Mothers" along with Nina Totenberg, Linda Wertheimer, and Cokie Roberts. She worked for NPR in a variety of roles, including as a special correspondent, until her retirement in 2025.

== Early life and education ==
Susan Stamberg was born Susan Levitt in Newark, New Jersey, on September 7, 1938. She was an only child to parents both of Lithuanian-Jewish descent. She grew up and attended school on the Upper West Side of Manhattan. As a child, one of her favorite radio programs was Grand Central Station. She attended the High School of Music & Art in Hamilton Heights, graduating in 1955.

The first in her family to attend college, she first attended Queens College before transferring to Barnard College, from which she graduated with a degree in English literature in 1959. After graduating, she took a summer job at the magazine 16 as a secretary. In fall 1959, she studied English at Brandeis University for three months before dropping out.

== Career ==
While living in Boston, Stamberg worked as a secretary for Daedalus, a publication of the American Academy of Arts and Sciences. It was also in Boston that she met Louis C. Stamberg, whom she later married in 1962. The couple moved to Washington, D.C. after Louis was hired by the United States Agency for International Development.

While living in Washington, D.C., Stamberg began working at WAMU as a producer. She made her on-air debut when the station's "weather girl" was ill. She continued to fill in for weather reports on WAMU, sometimes incorporating weather-appropriate poetry to battle the monotony of the job.

When her husband was working in New Delhi for two years, Stamberg worked for the American ambassador's wife and wrote stories for Voice of America.

Stamberg retired on September 1, 2025.

=== NPR ===
Stamberg was hired by NPR prior to its broadcast debut. Her first job was cutting audiotape. She and Linda Wertheimer shared an office, after insisting they have their own space. Stamberg went on to become a producer of All Things Considered, the evening news magazine.

For 14 years, beginning in 1972, Stamberg served as co-host of All Things Considered. She was the first woman to hold a full-time position as anchor of a national nightly news broadcast in the United States. In addition to the difficulties of being a woman in radio, she was also criticized by some NPR board members for being "too New York" (Stamberg had a strong New York accent). She also served as a managing editor of the program in its first few years.

In October 1979, she hosted Ask the President, a two-hour live radio event in which callers could ask questions of then-President Jimmy Carter.

She was the host of Weekend Edition Sunday from January 1987 to October 1989. In her first year with the program, she introduced the Sunday puzzle and invited the hosts of Car Talk to have their own segment.

Stamberg interviewed Fred Rogers several times as host of All Things Considered. In the 1980s, Stamberg and Rogers recorded several television specials.

After her departure from Weekend Edition Sunday, Stamberg worked as a special correspondent for NPR. She also was a guest host on Morning Edition, Weekend Edition Saturday, and Weekly Edition.

One of her most memorable interviews was with Nobel Prize–winning economist Milton Friedman. Stamberg argued with Friedman over the merits of the free market, claiming her conversations with "Russian cabbies" on the streets of New York had shown that the expatriates preferred life in the former Communist country to "how dreadfully tough their lives are here (the United States)." Friedman dismissed Stamberg's observation, contending, "I'm saying if you really want to know what they really believe about the relative merits of the two systems, see what they do, not what they say. And what they do is to stay here. They don't go back."

A recording of Stamberg's voice is used to announce elevator floor arrivals at NPR's headquarters in Washington, D.C.

==== Journalistic interests and style ====
Stamberg, who found politics "the most boring thing imaginable", preferred to report on cultural news "with a seriousness of purpose". In her reporting about Elia Kazan's 1988 memoir, for example, she led with his controversial 1952 testimony in the House Un-American Activities Committee. In her coverage of the Academy Awards, she liked to highlight workers behind-the-scenes of the year's nominated films.

In 1982, The Christian Science Monitor noted of her interviewing style that Stamberg had "an intuitive knack for knowing when to pursue a question and when to back off". Stamberg said of herself that 'I always want people to feel I'm someone who respects them, who will do right by them, who is not there to exploit them. I don't like all that bulldog stuff in confrontational interviews, so I don't do them". She sought to bring more women into radio, pressuring producers "to run stories by and about women and to use female analysts".

==== Cranberry sauce recipes ====
Each Thanksgiving from 1971, Stamberg provided NPR listeners with her mother-in-law's recipe for a cranberry relish sauce that is unusual in having horseradish as one of its principal ingredients. Each year Stamberg came up with a new way to present the recipe, for example sharing the dish with rapper Coolio in 2010. The recipe is known as "Mama Stamberg's Cranberry Relish Recipe". The elder Stamberg got it from a 1959 cookbook by Craig Claiborne, who in 1993 gave Stamberg his permission to continue sharing the recipe. In later years, Stamberg added an additional recipe for cranberry chutney, which was Stamberg's personal favorite cranberry recipe.

=== PBS ===
Stamberg was the first host of the PBS arts series Alive from Off Center, hosting from 1985 to 1986. She is the narrator on the award-winning American Public Television documentary Sharon Isbin: Troubadour.

== Publications ==
- Every Night at Five: Susan Stamberg's 'All Things Considered' Book. New York: Pantheon. 1982.

== Awards and recognition ==
- 1980 Edward R. Murrow Award (CPB)
- 1994 induction into the Broadcasting Hall of Fame.
- 1996 induction into the National Radio Hall of Fame
- Hollywood Walk of Fame star (6363 Hollywood Boulevard in front of Dash Radio), March 3, 2020; for contributions to radio

== Personal life and death ==
Stamberg was married to Louis C. Stamberg, who died on October 9, 2007. Stamberg is the mother of actor Josh Stamberg. She was Jewish. She was a distant cousin to All Things Considered host Ari Shapiro.

Stamberg died on October 16, 2025, of undisclosed causes, at the age of 87.

== See also ==
- List of NPR personnel
