= Fresh Air =

American talk show on National Public Radio

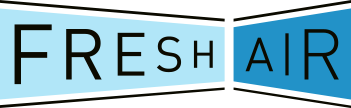
- Genre: Interview
- Running time: c. 50 min.
- Country of origin: United States
- Language: English
- Home station: WHYY
- Syndicates: NPR, WHYY
- Hosted by: Terry Gross; Tonya Mosley
- Recording studio: Philadelphia, Pennsylvania
- Original release: 1975 – present
- Audio format: Stereophonic
- Website: Official website
- Podcast: www.npr.org/podcasts/381444908/fresh-air

Fresh Air is an American radio talk show broadcast on National Public Radio stations across the United States since 1987. It is produced by WHYY-FM in Philadelphia, Pennsylvania, and hosted by Terry Gross and Tonya Mosley. The show is fed live weekdays at 12:00 noon ET, and some stations carry Fresh Air Weekend, a re-programming of highlights of the week's interviews. It won Peabody Awards in 1994 and 2022.

== History ==
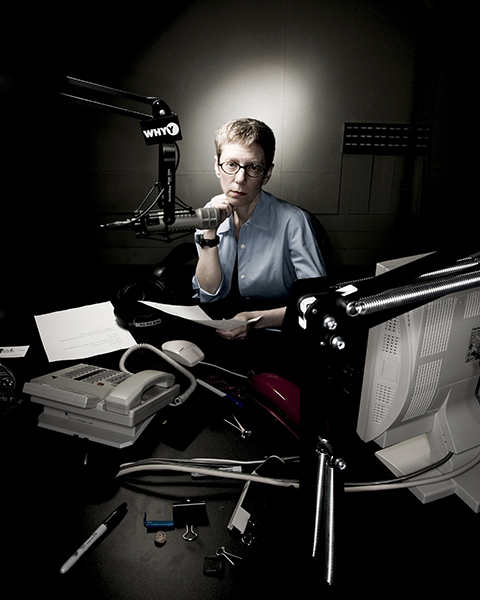
Terry Gross, host of the NPR radio program Fresh Air, in the WHYY studios in Philadelphia in 2004

The show began in 1975 at WHYY (then called WUHY), with Judy Blank as host. In September of that year, Terry Gross took over as presenter and producer; nearly 50 years later she remains its chief presenter. In 1985, WHYY launched a weekly half-hour edition of Fresh Air, which was distributed nationally by NPR. The show began daily national broadcasts in 1987.

In February 2002, when host Gross interviewed Gene Simmons of Kiss, Simmons discussed his sexual experimentation with women of all age groups and propositioned Gross in demonstration; according to NPR's website, Simmons withheld permission to supply transcripts or audio of the interview on their website.

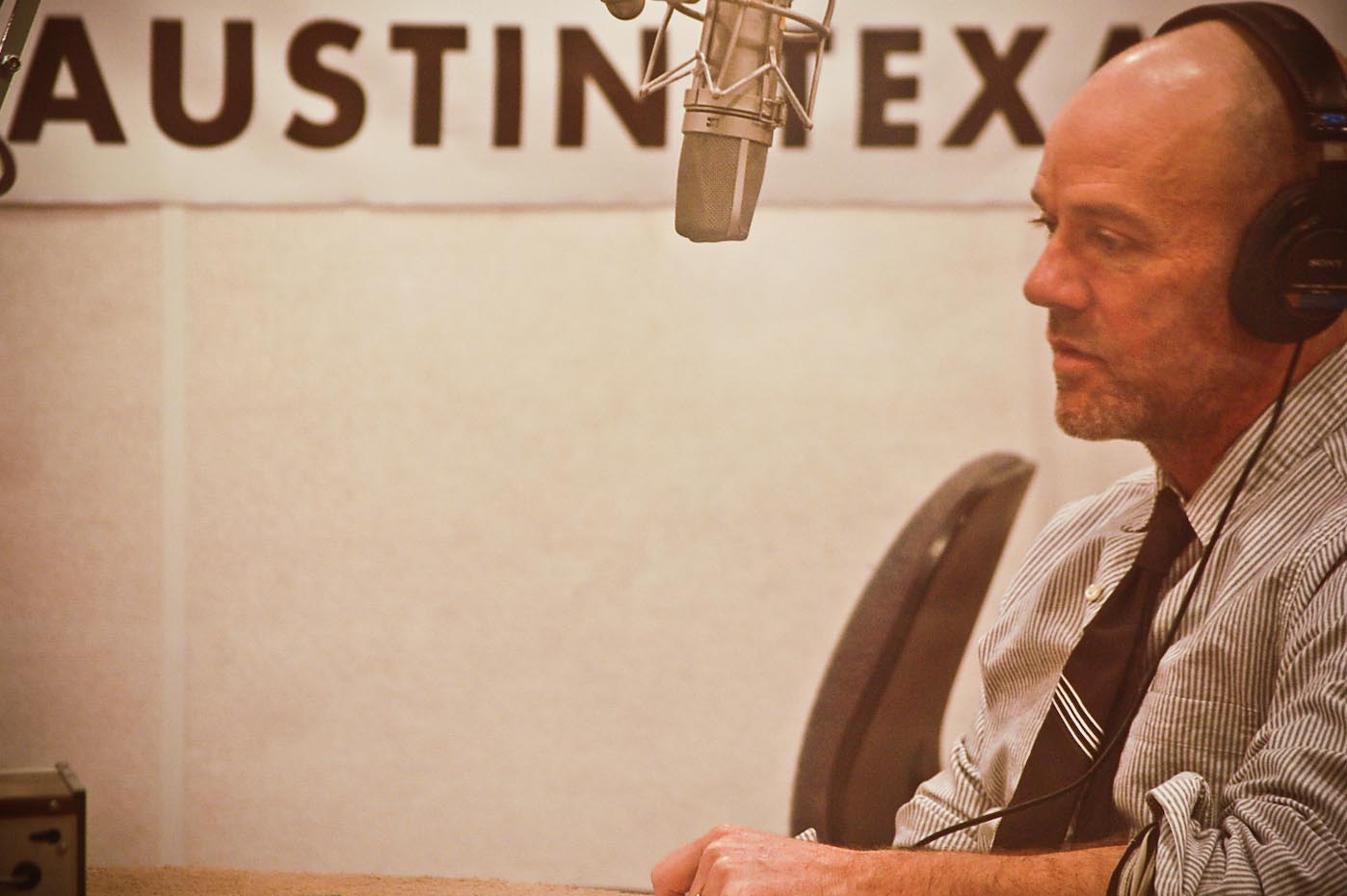
R.E.M.'s Michael Stipe has been interviewed by host Terry Gross.

In July 2010, Fresh Air was removed from Mississippi Public Broadcasting radio because of "recurring inappropriate content", shortly after the broadcast of an interview with comedian Louis C.K. in which he discussed his sex life. By mid-2011, it had returned to the state network's evening line-up.

David Edelstein was sacked from his position as film critic for the show on November 27, 2018, for comments made in the wake of Bernardo Bertolucci's death.

Tonya Mosley, who co-hosted WBUR's Here & Now, was named co-host of Fresh Air in 2023. The show was formerly titled "Fresh Air with Terry Gross" but is now simply branded "Fresh Air".

Past contributors include Geoff Nunberg, Milo Miles, and Ed Ward.

Guests have included R.E.M.'s Michael Stipe.

== Description and people ==
The show is composed primarily of interviews with prominent figures in various fields, among them entertainment and the arts, culture, journalism, and global current affairs. This main segment is followed by shorter segments, most often comprising coverage and reviews of events and new releases in various cultural and entertainment spheres. The subjects of these shorter segments include movies, books, stage plays, television programs, as well as recordings of popular music, jazz, and classical music. The program also features commentary and interviews from a range of regular contributors, including Maureen Corrigan, David Bianculli, Dave Davies, Ken Tucker, Kevin Whitehead, John Powers, Lloyd Schwartz, Justin Chang, and Nick Quah.

The executive producer of Fresh Air is Danny Miller. The program is produced and edited by Phyllis Myers, Ann Marie Baldonado, Sam Briger, Lauren Krenzel, Therese Madden, Thea Chaloner, Susan Nyakundi and Anna Bauman. The show is directed by Roberta Shorrock. Audrey Bentham is the engineer. Molly Seavy-Nesper is the producer of Digital Media.

The show's theme song, a jazz piece called "Fresh Air", was composed for the program by Joel Forrester of The Microscopic Septet.

Film critic John Powers was appointed as the program's film critic, a role lasting six years, before becoming "pop culture and critic-at-large" for Fresh Air, a role he retains as of November 2025. Powers is an approved reviewer for review aggregator Rotten Tomatoes, and a member of the Los Angeles Film Critics Association.

=== Broadcast ===
The program's interviews are pre-recorded and edited, not broadcast live. As with many such radio programs, guests are often not in the studio during recording, and often speak remotely from a local affiliate station, or a home studio. When pressing news requires, the show has gone live, such as during the Soviet coup attempt of 1991, and in the aftermath of the Boston Marathon bombing on April 19, 2013.

Fresh Air interviews are generally first aired on the Monday through Thursday shows. The Friday shows are rebroadcasts of past interviews. In addition, some stations carry Fresh Air Weekend, a re-programming of highlights of the week's interviews.

== Reach ==
In 2016, Fresh Air was the most-downloaded podcast on iTunes.

In 2017, the show was being syndicated to 624 stations and claimed nearly 5 million listeners.

== Publications ==
In 2004, Gross published a book of her favorite interviews from the show under the title All I Did Was Ask.

== Recognition ==
In 1993, NPR, Fresh Air, and Gross were presented with the George Foster Peabody Award with praise for her "probing questions, revelatory interviews, and unusual insights". The show was inducted into the National Radio Hall of Fame in 2012. The show also won an institutional Peabody in 2022.

In 2016, Gross received the National Humanities Medal from President Barack Obama, "For her artful probing of the human experience. Her patient, persistent questioning in thousands of interviews over four decades has pushed public figures to reveal personal motivations behind extraordinary lives—revealing simple truths that affirm our common humanity."

In 2022, Fresh Air won its second Peabody Award.
