= Joe Palca =

American science journalist

Joseph Palca
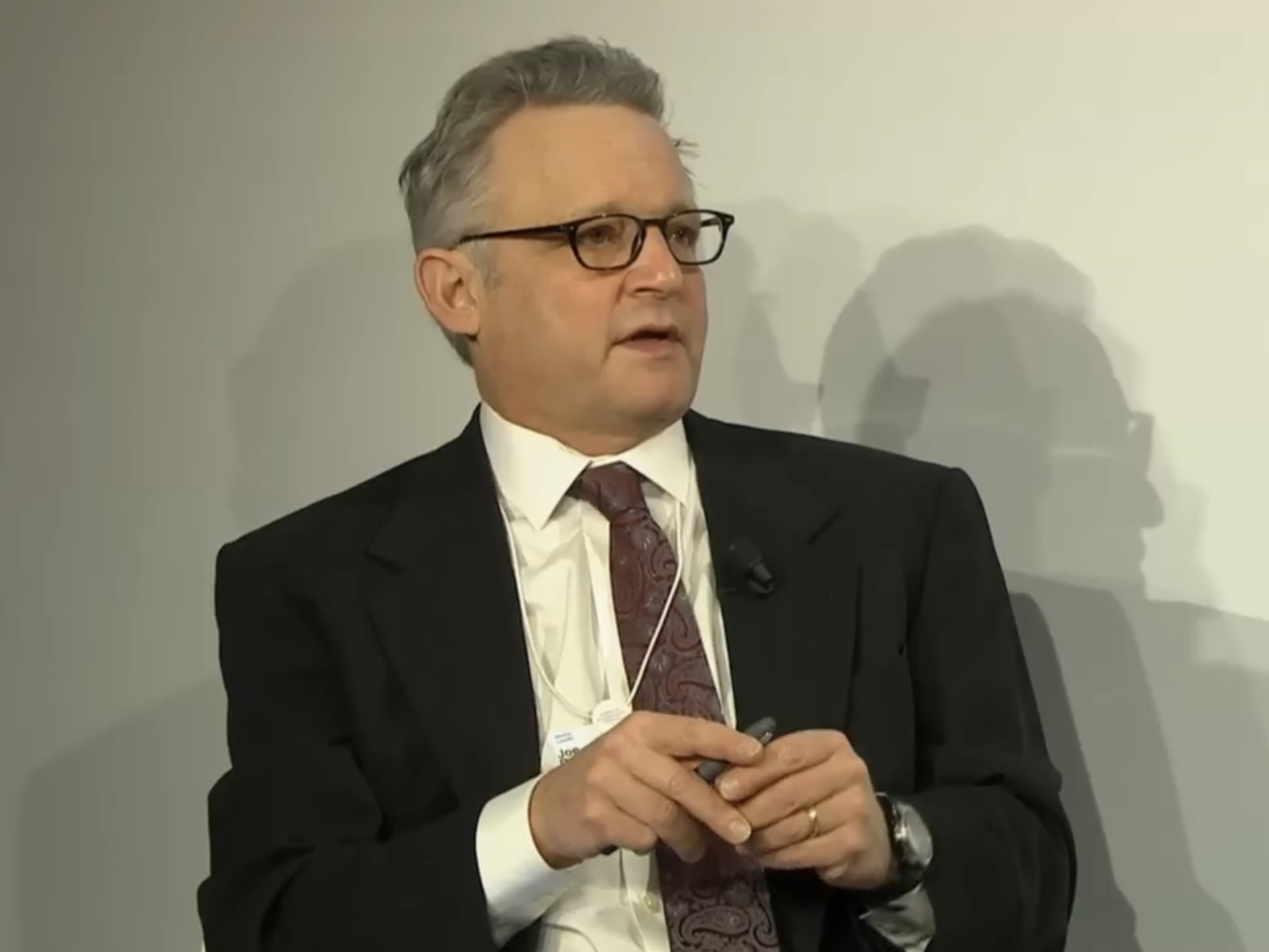
- Joe Palca, 2015
- Education: Pomona College (BA); University of California, Santa Cruz (PhD)
- Occupation: Journalist
- Employer: National Public Radio
- Known for: Science Journalism

Joe Palca is an American correspondent for National Public Radio. He specializes in science, and is the backup host for Talk of the Nation Science Friday. Palca was also the president of the National Association of Science Writers from 1999 to 2000. He currently serves on Society for Science's board of trustees.

== Education ==
He attended Pomona College, graduating with an undergraduate degree in psychology in 1974. He then received a PhD in psychology from the University of California, Santa Cruz, where he researched human sleep physiology.

== Career ==
Palca began his career in journalism in 1982 at the CBS affiliate in Washington, D.C. He left television in 1986 to become a print journalist; he was both a Washington news editor at Nature and a senior correspondent for Science. He went on to join NPR in 1992. He took a sabbatical from NPR in late 1999 for a year to study human clinical trials as a Kaiser Family Foundation Media Fellow. He also co-created the NPR science communication training program, formerly known as Friends of Joe's Big Idea and now called NPR Scicommers, with fellow NPR staffer Maddie Sofia.

Joe retired from NPR in October, 2022, after 30 years of service.

== Awards ==
- National Academies Communication Award
- Science-in-Society Award from the National Association of Science Writers
- James T. Grady-James H. Stack Award for Interpreting Chemistry for the Public from the American Chemical Society
- Journalism Prize from the American Association for the Advancement of Science
- Ohio State Award
