= Dalton High School (Ohio) =

Coordinates: 40°48′12″N 81°41′44″W

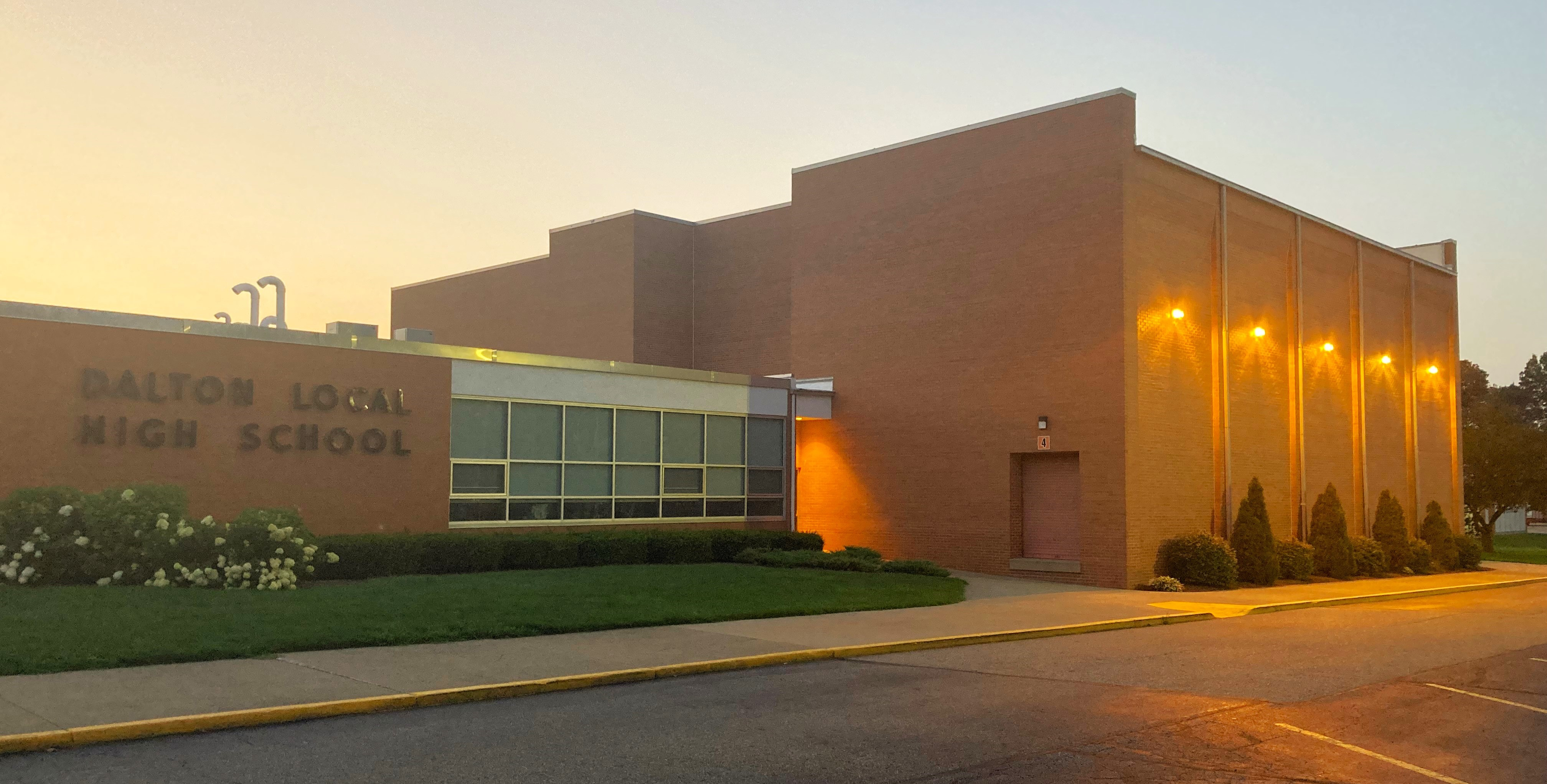

Location
- 177 Mill Street North; Dalton, Ohio 44618; United States

Information
- Type: Public, Co-Ed
- Motto: Bulldog Pride District Wide
- School district: Dalton Local Schools
- Superintendent: Scott Beatty
- Principal: Steve Watkins
- Teaching staff: 16.64 (FTE)
- Grades: 9-12
- Student to teacher ratio: 17.55
- Colors: Orange & Black
- Athletics conference: Wayne County Athletic League
- Mascot: Bo the Bulldog
- Nickname: Bulldogs
- Yearbook: Luanna
- Communities served: Dalton, Kidron
- Affiliation: OHSAA
- Website: https://www.daltonlocal.org/high-school

Dalton High School is a public high school in Dalton, Ohio. It is the only high school in the Dalton Local Schools district. Their nickname is the Bulldogs. The principal of the school is Mr. Steve Watkins.

== Athletics ==
Dalton's football team has a long rivalry with both the Chippewa Chipps and the Rittman Miners, both of which run back to their first meetings in 1925 and 1924 respectively. This dates back to when the Wayne County B League only had four teams from Apple Creek, Doylestown (Chippewa), Rittman, and Dalton. Had Dalton fielded a team for three years in the 1940s and if Rittman had remained in the league through the 40s and 50s, both rivalries would most likely be more contiguous than the Orrville-Wooster rivalry. The Chippewa rivalry is the second-most played rivalry in Wayne County after Chippewa/Rittman.

Due to the recent success of all three teams, Dalton's strongest rivalry games as of late have been with the Smithville Smithies and the Waynedale Golden Bears. All three schools have combined to either share or outright win the WCAL football title 45 times from 1960-2021, and in that time frame there have only been 17 seasons where none of the three have contributed to a football championship.

The 2016-2017 academic year was the first year in school history that featured two sports play in State semifinal games. Both the volleyball and boys baseball teams advanced to the Final Four. This was the baseball team's first trip since 2005 and the volleyball team's second trip in six years.

== Ohio High School Athletic Association state titles ==
- Girls Softball – 2006, 2007
- Girls Volleyball - 2026

== Notable alumni ==
- Chris Kirkpatrick Class of 1990, actor and musician, best known as a founding member of the pop group NSYNC
