= Planet Money =

Economics podcast

- Genre: Economic, culture, business
- Language: English

Cast and voices
- Hosted by: Amanda Aronczyk; Erika Beras; Mary Childs; Nick Fountain; Sarah Gonzalez; Jeff Guo; Alexi Horowitz-Ghazi; Kenny Malone

Production
- Production: Alex Goldmark (executive producer), Jess Jiang (editor), Molly Messick (editor), Dave Blanchard, Sam Yellowhorse Kesler, Emma Peaslee, Willa Rubin, James Sneed.
- Length: 15–30 minutes

Publication
- Original release: September 6, 2008
- Provider: National Public Radio
- Updates: Twice weekly

Reception
- Cited for: Peabody Award 2016

Related
- Website: www.npr.org/money

Planet Money is an American podcast and blog produced by NPR that explains economic topics in a way that is aimed at a broad audience. Alex Blumberg and Adam Davidson created the podcast in the early days of the 2008 financial crisis. Episodes are generally 30 minutes or less stand-alone explorations of a specific concept, though the podcast has also released several series following specific projects, such as production of a t-shirt or publication of a book.

As of April 2026, the podcast had released over 1,500 episodes. Some of these have been incorporated into undergraduate courses at some universities.

Planet Money also releases content on their website, YouTube, and TikTok, including short-form content, and has a spinoff podcast, The Indicator.

== History ==
The podcast was created by Alex Blumberg and Adam Davidson after the success of "The Giant Pool of Money," an episode they recorded for This American Life. Planet Money was launched on September 6, 2008, to cover the 2008 financial crisis in the wake of the federal takeover of Fannie Mae and Freddie Mac. In early 2020, Planet Money celebrated its 1000th episode, bringing back many former hosts and contributors to mark the occasion.

== Program ==
The length of the podcasts ranges between 6–30 minutes. Planet Money uses abridged narratives to tackle popular, complex topics like American health care or insider trading. The format aims to make economic journalism approachable to audiences interested in learning more about popular economic issues, but who do not have an academic background in economics. The episodes are typically stand-alone. The interviewees or guests range from academic experts and business professionals to general members of the North American public. Providing listeners with primary source material, the podcast's hosts contribute contextual framing and commentary. Intimate stories are used as a leading thread and use commonplace language with entertaining plots to describe abstract or complex economic and political issues. This method translates political or economic topics, once historically dependent on academic language and higher education, to stories that engage the general public. This technique engages larger and/or younger audiences, while other audiences are attracted by their coverage of popular topics within North American culture.

Planet Money provides regular reports for Morning Edition and All Things Considered and occasional episodes for This American Life. Planet Money was the first to report the small print in the Emergency Economic Stabilization Act of 2008 that allowed deviation from the original Paulson plan. Senator Max Baucus praised the show's attempts to explain the financial crisis "in terms the average American starts to understand". Planet Money episodes have been incorporated into undergraduate microeconomics and macroeconomics courses at some universities.

Planet Money was involved in an NPR series about the Wells Fargo account fraud scandal, which earned NPR a 2016 Peabody Award. The podcast also won best podcast at the 2015 RAIN Internet Radio Awards.

== External projects ==
In 2012, Planet Money asked five economists (Dean Baker, Russ Roberts, Katherine Baicker, Luigi Zingales and Robert H. Frank) from across the spectrum to put together a "No-Brainer Economic Platform". The policies were:

1. Eliminate the mortgage interest deduction, as it distorts the market and drives up housing prices.
2. Eliminate the deduction for employer-provided health insurance, as it drives up health care costs.
3. Eliminate the corporate income tax.
4. Eliminate all income and payroll taxes, as they reduce the incentives to work and to hire, respectively.
5. Tax carbon emissions, as it gives people an incentive to stop polluting.
6. Legalize marijuana, as arresting, prosecuting and incarcerating marijuana users is a waste of resources, and the war on drugs drives up drug prices.

In 2017, The Indicator, hosted by Planet Money's Stacey Vanek Smith and the Financial Times' Cardiff Garcia, was launched as Planet Money's first spin-off podcast. With a similar storytelling approach, it delivers faster, shorter, more frequent podcasts. The podcast, which publishes every weekday, breaks down big ideas using Planet Money's style of witty entertainment-journalism. Each episode is approximately 10 minutes or less.

On February 28, 2018, the first episode of Planet Money Shorts was released. Planet Money Shorts is a monthly video series created by Bronson Arcuri and Ben Naddaff-Hafrey and published by NPR. It can be streamed from their webpage or watched on their YouTube channel.

In 2020, Planet Money began posting videos on TikTok and also joined the platform's #LearnOnTikTok initiative which paid creators and publishers to post education content on the platform. In 2021, the account was nominated for a Webby Award in the "Education & Discovery, Social Video (Social)" category.

Planet Money has launched unique projects such as buying 100 barrels of crude oil and following it from ground to gas tank, launching a satellite, and building an algorithmic trading Twitter bot. Inspired by the book The Travels of a T-shirt in the Global Economy by Pietra Rivoli, the Planet Money team made a t-shirt and followed the shirt in a step-by-step journey from resource production to manufacturing. The design for the shirt was a squirrel holding a martini glass, which was meant to reference the economist John Maynard Keynes' phrase for the human elements in economics, the "animal spirits." More than 25,000 of the shirts were sold online. The t-shirts were sold as part of a Kickstarter campaign became an unexpected runaway hit, raising more than 10 times their original goal of $50,000. Executive producer Alex Blumberg worked with Pietra Rivoli as project advisor, and Kainaz Amaria, Brian Boyer, and Joshua Davis were managing producers.

The Planet Money team also attempted to buy the rights to lesser-known Marvel Comics character Doorman for $10,000. After meeting with Gene Luen Yang to talk about his reboot of the public domain character Green Turtle, the team decided to adapt the fellow public domain character Micro-Face. Alex Segura wrote a 24-page comic, with interior art by Jamal Igle, lettering by Taylor Esposito, coloring by Ellie Wright, and cover art by Jerry Ordway.

The podcast released a book, Planet Money: A Guide to the Economic Forces That Shape Your Life, published by W. W. Norton & Company in 2026, and documented the publication process in a series of episodes.

== Hosts ==
=== Current hosts ===
- Amanda Aronczyk
- Erika Beras
- Mary Childs
- Nick Fountain
- Sarah Gonzalez
- Jeff Guo
- Alexi Horowitz-Ghazi
- Kenny Malone
- Greg Rosalsky

=== Former hosts ===
- Alex Blumberg
- Ailsa Chang
- Zoe Chace
- Karen Duffin
- Cardiff Garcia
- Jacob Goldstein
- Steve Henn
- Chana Joffe-Walt
- Caitlin Kenney
- David Kestenbaum
- Noel King
- Robert Smith
- Stacey Vanek Smith
