= Alt.Latino =

Latin music podcast

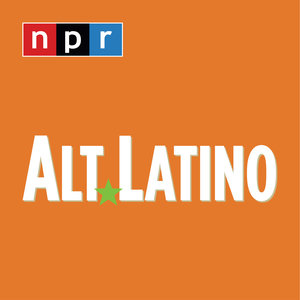
- Genre: Music, Talk radio
- Running time: Approximately 30 to 60 minutes
- Country of origin: United States
- Languages: English, sometimes Spanish
- Syndicates: National Public Radio
- Hosted by: Felix Contreras; Anamaria Sayre
- Original release: June 15, 2010 – present
- Website: Official Website
- Podcast: Podcast Feed

Alt.Latino is a radio show and podcast about Latin alternative music and Latin American culture, produced by NPR. The show launched in 2010 and is hosted by Felix Contreras and Anamaria Sayre. It features music and interviews with Latino musicians, actors, film makers and writers.

== Hosts ==
- Felix Contreras - co-founder and host. Contreras is from a Mexican American family in California. Previously, Contreras was a producer and reporter for NPR's Arts Desk. He is also a part-time musician who plays Afro-Cuban percussion with various jazz and Latin bands.
- Anamaria Artemisa Sayre - Sayre is from southern California and is of Mexican descent. She previously worked as a multimedia producer with NPR. Sayre began co-hosting the show with Contreras in September 2022.

=== Former hosts ===
- Jasmine Garsd Garcia - Garsd is a reporter and journalist originally from Buenos Aires, Argentina. She co-founded the show and was a co-host from 2010 through 2016, when she left to work at the BBC.

== 'El Tiny' ==
Beginning in 2021, Alt.Latino has hosted "El Tiny," a Tiny Desk takeover focusing on Latin artists during Hispanic Heritage Month. The name comes from a member of Jorge Drexler's band, who used the term to describe the desk during Drexler's 2018 performance.
