= Scott Tong =

American journalist and radio host

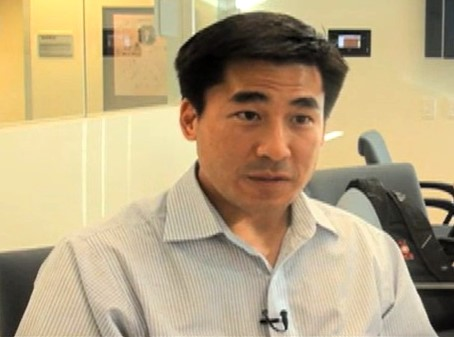
Tong in 2011

Scott Tong is an American journalist and radio host. He is a former correspondent for Marketplace on APM. He is the co-host of Here & Now along with Robin Young.

Tong has a BA in government from Georgetown University, and is the author of A Village With My Name: A Family History of China’s Opening to the World (University of Chicago Press, 2017)
