= Here and Now (Boston) =

American public radio magazine program

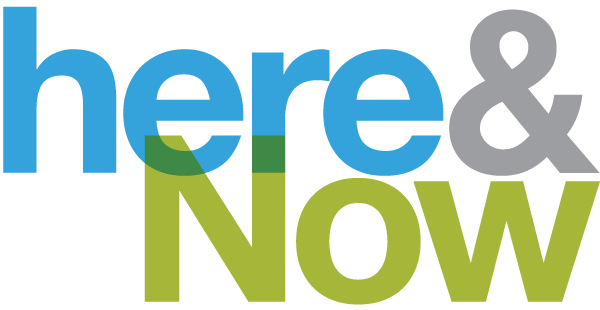
- Genre: News: Global news, National news, opinion, analysis, commentary, interviews, discussion
- Country of origin: United States
- Language: English
- Home station: WBUR-FM
- Syndicates: NPR
- Hosted by: Robin Young; Scott Tong
- Created by: WBUR and NPR
- Original release: 1997 – Present
- Audio format: Stereophonic
- Opening theme: "You Give Me Problems About My Business" by The Mercury Program
- Website: hereandnow.wbur.org
- Podcast: npr.org/rss/podcast

Here and Now (stylized as Here & Now) is a public radio magazine program produced by NPR and WBUR-FM in Boston and distributed across the United States by NPR to over 450 stations, with an estimated 5 million weekly listeners.

== Schedule ==
On July 1, 2013, Here and Now began broadcasting as a two-hour program with a "full rollover" (meaning the show broadcasts from noon to 4 p.m. ET) airing Monday to Friday and generally in the midday hours on its affiliate stations. The show covers U.S. and international news, and provides arts and culture coverage.

Here and Now has three cutaways for newscasts: one from :04:00 to :06:00 past the hour, occupying a portion of the national five-minute newscast from NPR, and two one-minute summaries of national news headlines at 0:18:00 and 0:38:00 past the hour, produced and anchored in-house at WBUR.

== History ==
Here and Now first began airing in 1997, when it was co-hosted by Tovia Smith and Bruce Gellerman. At the time, the show was billed as a local or regional current affairs show, concentrating on newsworthy events throughout the six New England states. The show expanded to include national and international elements, its current format, soon after.

Host Robin Young joined the show in 2000, replacing Smith, and outlasted a series of co-hosts, including founding co-host and executive producer Gellerman. In 2005, WBUR had announced that the show would return to its roots as a local current affairs program, but a national distribution deal with PRI changed that plan.

The cancellation of NPR's midday newsmagazine Day to Day in March 2009 left a gap in public radio's programming day. News-heavy stations in some markets opted to pick up Here and Now as the replacement.

Building on that philosophy, on March 29, 2013, NPR and WBUR announced that call-in show Talk of the Nation would cease production and NPR would replace it with a two-hour version of Here and Now. The reported reason for the change was a desire of bigger NPR member stations to have a midday magazine-style news show acting as a bridge between network stalwarts Morning Edition and All Things Considered. The expanded version of Here and Now debuted on July 1, 2013, with Jeremy Hobson as a second host.

Tonya Mosley became a co-host in 2019, while Jeremy Hobson left in October 2020. Scott Tong joined the show as co-host on August 9, 2021. Mosley stepped down as a host in 2022. Deepa Fernandes joined the show as a co-host on October 10, 2022, continuing in that role until the end of April 2025.

The entire program was available as a podcast until September 16, 2022. At that time, the podcast was relaunched as “Here & Now Anytime,” hosted by Chris Bentley. “Here & Now Anytime” is a curated selection of news and culture stories from the radio show, as well as podcast-only exclusive interviews and reporting. The new podcast is roughly 30 minutes per day. The complete daily show is still being broadcast on radio and can also be accessed on WBUR's website.
