= Smithville, Ohio =

- Village
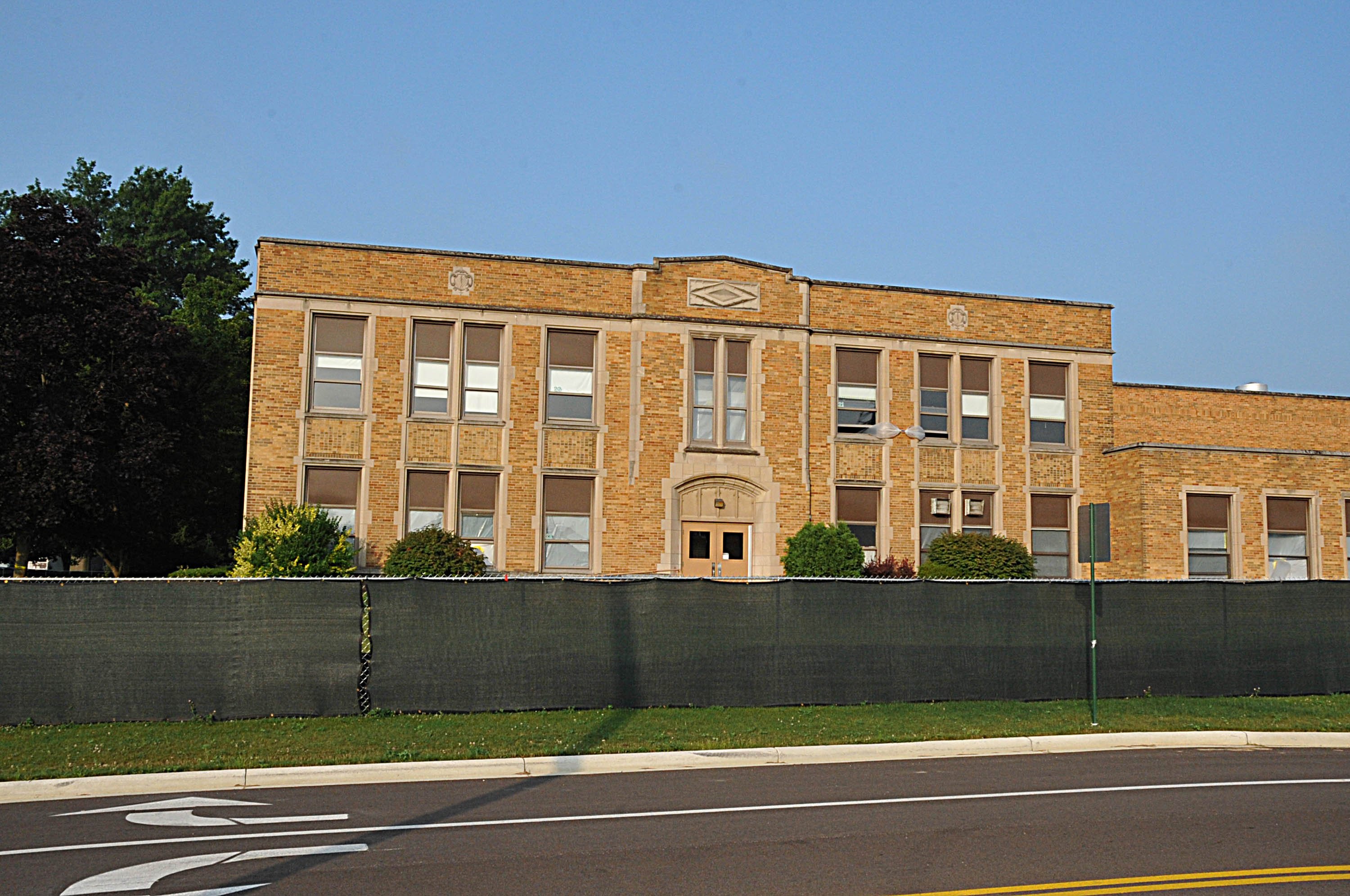
- Former middle school, demolished in 2014

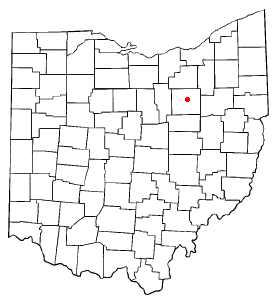
- Location of Smithville, Ohio

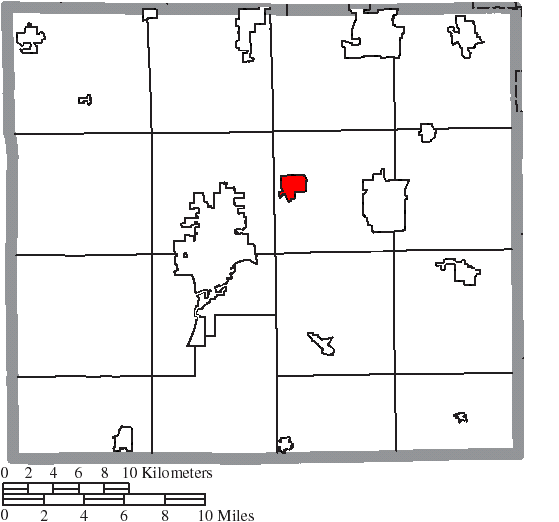
- Location of Smithville in Wayne County
- Coordinates: 40°51′45″N 81°51′37″W
- Country: United States
- State: Ohio
- County: Wayne

Area
  - Total: 1.24 sq mi (3.22 km^{2})
  - Land: 1.24 sq mi (3.20 km^{2})
  - Water: 0.0039 sq mi (0.01 km^{2})
- Elevation: 1,073 ft (327 m)

Population (2020)
  - Total: 1,338
  - Density: 1,082.6/sq mi (417.98/km^{2})
- Time zone: UTC-5 (Eastern (EST))
  - Summer (DST): UTC-4 (EDT)
- ZIP code: 44677
- Area code: 330
- FIPS code: 39-72788
- GNIS feature ID: 2399834
- Website: www.thevillageofsmithville.com

Smithville is a village in Wayne County, Ohio, United States. The population was 1,338 at the time of the 2020 census. The village derives its name from Thomas Smith, a pioneer settler.

== Geography ==
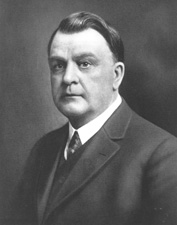
Kirtland I. Perky

Smithville is located along Sugar Creek.

According to the United States Census Bureau, the village has a total area of 1.25 square miles (3.24 km^{2}), of which, 1.24 square miles (3.21 km^{2}) is land and 0.01 square miles (0.03 km^{2}) is water.

== Demographics ==
Historical population
Census	Pop.	Note	%±
1880	546		—
1890	482		−11.7%
1900	474		−1.7%
1910	447		−5.7%
1920	482		7.8%
1930	582		20.7%
1940	617		6.0%
1950	755		22.4%
1960	1,024		35.6%
1970	1,278		24.8%
1980	1,467		14.8%
1990	1,354		−7.7%
2000	1,333		−1.6%
2010	1,252		−6.1%
2020	1,338		6.9%
U.S. Decennial Census

=== 2010 census ===
As of the census of 2010, there were 1,252 people, 541 households, and 371 families living in the village. The population density was 1,009.7 inhabitants per square mile (389.8/km^{2}). There were 573 housing units at an average density of 462.1 per square mile (178.4/km^{2}). The racial makeup of the village was 97.8% White, 0.9% African American, 0.4% Native American, 0.6% Asian, and 0.3% from two or more races. Hispanic or Latino of any race were 1.3% of the population.

There were 541 households, of which 28.5% had children under the age of 18 living with them, 52.1% were married couples living together, 12.9% had a female householder with no husband present, 3.5% had a male householder with no wife present, and 31.4% were non-families. 28.1% of all households were made up of individuals, and 9.6% had someone living alone who was 65 years of age or older. The average household size was 2.31 and the average family size was 2.81.

The median age in the village was 44.2 years. 21.8% of residents were under the age of 18; 8.6% were between the ages of 18 and 24; 20.4% were from 25 to 44; 32.7% were from 45 to 64; and 16.6% were 65 years of age or older. The gender makeup of the village was 47.1% male and 52.9% female.

=== 2000 census ===
As of the census of 2000, there were 1,333 people, 545 households, and 395 families living in the village. The population density was 1,079.5 inhabitants per square mile (416.8/km^{2}). There were 562 housing units at an average density of 455.1 per square mile (175.7/km^{2}). The racial makeup of the village was 98.65% White, 0.15% African American, 0.23% Native American, 0.53% Asian, and 0.45% from two or more races. Hispanic or Latino of any race were 0.45% of the population.

There were 545 households, out of which 31.7% had children under the age of 18 living with them, 59.1% were married couples living together, 10.6% had a female head of household with no husband present, and 27.5% were non-families. 26.8% of all households were made up of individuals, and 11.6% had someone living alone who was 65 years of age or older. The average household size was 2.45 and the average family size was 2.93.

In the village, the population was spread out, with 25.0% under the age of 18, 8.3% from 18 to 24, 27.8% from 25 to 44, 22.1% from 45 to 64, and 16.7% who were 65 years of age or older. The median age was 38 years. For every 100 females there were 90.4 males. For every 100 females age 18 and over, there were 86.2 males.

The median income for a household in the village was $39,662, and the median income for a family was $47,109. Males had a median income of $32,500 versus $22,847 for females. The per capita income for the village was $18,329. About 5.2% of families and 5.9% of the population were below the poverty line, including 6.3% of those under age 18 and 7.1% of those age 65 or over.

== Education ==
Smithville is home to the Wayne County Schools Career Center. It is also home to the campus of the Green Local School District, which also includes nearby Marshallville.

== Notable residents ==
- Kirtland I. Perky, United States senator from Idaho
- David Dale Reimer, ambassador to Mauritius, the Seychelles, and Sierra Leone
- Dale Willman, Award-winning journalist
- John Howard Yoder, prominent Mennonite theologian and ethicist
