= Robin Young =

American journalist (born 1950)

- Born: Robin Caldwell Youngs; 1950 (age 75–76); Long Island, New York, U.S.
- Education: Ithaca College
- Occupations: Radio host, journalist
- Relatives: John Savage (brother); Jim Youngs (brother)
- Awards: Peabody Award 1990; Emmy Award (5 times); Massachusetts Broadcasters Hall of Fame (2010)

Robin Caldwell Young (née Youngs; born 1950) is an American television and radio personality. She worked ten years in television, winning the Peabody Award for her documentary The Los Altos Story. In 2000, she shifted to radio in Boston. Young co-hosts the NPR and WBUR daily news magazine program Here and Now along with Scott Tong.

== Early life and education ==
Young was born on Long Island, New York in 1950. She attended Ithaca College in Ithaca, New York, graduating in 1972. The college gave her the Outstanding Young Alumni Award in 1982. She has lived and worked in Manhattan, Washington, DC, Los Angeles and Boston.

Her three siblings are all actors. Gail Youngs and Jim Youngs are her sister and brother. Her third sibling is veteran film actor John Savage.

== Career in broadcasting ==
She began in television as a secretary at Channel 38 in Boston in 1973. In 1975, she went on air as the first female radio announcer at WBZ (Boston). She made her first television appearance on WBZ-TV's Evening Magazine in 1977. From 1982 to 1983, Young was lead presenter, along with Tom Ellis, for the revamped evening newscasts on WNEV-TV (now WHDH) Channel 7.

After one year, she switched her role at the station and began hosting and producing a number of primetime specials under her own production company, Young Visions. In 1988, Young was "Life" section anchor of USA Today: The Television Show, a nationally syndicated news program. She also hosted the Today show and CBS This Morning.

She made the documentary The Los Altos Story, promoting HIV/AIDS awareness; she won the Peabody Award in 1990 for this program.

Young has hosted Here and Now since 2000. The show normally consists of five interview segments with reporters, politicians, artists, authors and experts on a given subject. It is broadcast from noon to 2 pm on WBUR and is distributed by NPR. In July 2013, Here and Now expanded to two hours. The show is produced at WBUR in Boston.

== Awards ==
Young has won the Peabody and CableACE Awards for documentary film making and five Emmy Awards for excellence in broadcasting. She was inducted into the Massachusetts Broadcasters Hall of Fame in 2010.
