= Consider This (podcast) =

American news podcast

- Genre: News analysis
- Language: American English

Cast and voices
- Hosted by: Ailsa Chang, Mary Louise Kelly, Scott Detrow, Juana Summers (weekdays); various correspondents (Sundays)

Production
- Length: 10–15 minutes

Publication
- Original release: June 29, 2020
- Provider: NPR
- Updates: Monday-Saturday

Related
- Website: www.npr.org/podcasts/510355/considerthis

Consider This is a daily afternoon news podcast by the American media organization NPR, which typically releases new episodes Sunday through Friday around 5 p.m. ET.

== Background ==
Consider This originated as a continuation of NPR's Coronavirus Daily podcast., published since March 2020. By June 29 of that year, the podcast adopted its current name and broadened its scope to cover a variety of national news topics, with its focus on facets of a single story in each episode. The podcast is also a complement to NPR's flagship afternoon news program All Things Considered, with which it shares hosts including Ailsa Chang, Mary Louise Kelly, Scott Detrow, and Juana Summers. Early episodes were also hosted by Embedded host Kelly McEvers and then-ATC co-host Audie Cornish. The podcast expanded on January 8, 2022, to a weekend edition. It was published on Saturdays with Michel Martin as the primary host until April 29, 2023, and has been published on Sundays since May 7, 2023, with hosting from various NPR correspondents.

By September 2020, NPR began augmenting its national content for Consider This with contributions from NPR member stations in ten selected markets. As of June 2022, local stories are currently produced by member stations in Boston (WBUR and WGBH); Chicago (WBEZ); Dallas/Fort Worth (KERA); Los Angeles (KPCC and KCRW); Minneapolis/St. Paul (MPR); New York (WNYC); Philadelphia (WHYY); Portland, Oregon (OPB); San Francisco (KQED); and Washington, DC (WAMU). The ten regions are intended as a pilot group, which NPR plans to expand in the future.

Arun Rath from GBH and Paris Alston from WBUR host the local news in Boston. Rebeca Ibarra was the producer and host of the New York edition of the show in 2020. Janae Pierre is the producer and host of the New York edition of the show. NPR partnered with AdsWizz to provide local reporting the same way localized advertising is done and uses designated market areas provided by Nielsen Media Research.
