= St. Teresa's Academy =

Girls school in Kansas City, Missouri, US

Location
- 5600 Main Street; Kansas City, Missouri 64113; United States; 39°1′33″N 94°35′21″W

Information
- Type: Private, All-Girls
- Motto: Latin: Deo Adjuvante Non Timendum (With the help of God, we need not fear)
- Religious affiliation: Roman Catholic
- Established: 1866; 160 years ago
- President: Siahban May Washington
- Principal: Barbara McCormick
- Teaching staff: 46.5 (on a FTE basis)
- Grades: 9–12
- Enrollment: 605 (2013–14)
- Student to teacher ratio: 13.0
- Campus: Urban
- Colors: Gold, white, and black
- Nickname: Stars
- Rival: Notre Dame de Sion School
- Accreditation: North Central Association of Colleges and Schools
- Publication: Windmoor
- Newspaper: The Dart
- Yearbook: The Teresian
- Website: stteresasacademy.org

St. Teresa's Academy is a Catholic, independent secondary school for girls in Kansas City, Missouri, United States. It was founded in 1866 by the Sisters of St. Joseph of Carondelet, and accredited in 1923.

== History ==
St. Teresa's Academy was founded in 1866 at 12th and Washington in Kansas City's Quality Hill area and is sponsored by the Sisters of St. Joseph of Carondelet. It is the oldest school in Kansas City.

In 1909 the Sisters relocated St. Teresa's to a 20-acre (81,000 m^{2}) site at 5600 Main. On the cornerstone of the first campus building the Sisters inscribed the words of St. Teresa of Avila and the motto of the academy, Deo Adjuvante Non Timendum (Latin: With the help of God, we need not fear). They named the campus "Windmoor" because of the constant wind blowing across the open prairie.

In 1941 the Sisters added a second building, Donnelly Hall, which housed the city's first college for women. In 1962 the college moved to the south part of Kansas City and became Avila College, later Avila University. In 1982 a gymnasium, the Goppert Center, was completed for the school's women's athletic program. A fourth building, the Windmoor Center, was completed after 300 days of construction on February 2, 2012. In 2017 a St. Teresa's family donated over a million dollars to improve the school's STEM program. This money was used to renovate the Goppert Center, where a new campus ministry office, library, robotics lab, gymnasium, and weight-training room were added. Renovations were completed in May 2018 and became open to the student-body the following school year.

== Academics ==
The school's curriculum includes Advanced Placement classes and Advanced College Credit classes in conjunction with Rockhurst University and the University of Missouri-Kansas City.

St. Teresa's Academy's student newspaper, the Dart. has received numerous awards. DartNewsOnline.com, the website corresponding with the newspaper, received the title of Pacemaker, the highest award from the National Scholastic Press Association, for the 2009–2010 school year, the same year the website was launched.

The school's yearbook, the Teresian, has also won many national awards, including the Pacemaker in the academic years 2010-2011 and 2012–2013, placing it in the top 25 yearbooks in the nation, as well as the Pacemaker finalist in 2009–2010, 2011-2012 and 2013–2014. The Teresian also won awards including the All-American Award with 5 Marks of Distinction and the Gold Crown. In addition to its recognition for journalistic excellence at a national level as a book, many photographers, writers and graphic designers have received awards on a city, state, and national level for individual contributions to the book.

== Athletics ==
The academy fields athletic teams in basketball, soccer, volleyball, cross country, golf, track, softball, swimming, tennis, dance and lacrosse. The school recently built a new track and field facility on campus that is highlighted by an 8-lane Mondo surface track and field that is set up for girls soccer, lacrosse and softball. The Stars compete in the largest class of MSHSAA sports; most recently playing for district championships in soccer, basketball, golf, tennis, cross country and volleyball.

== Notable alumnae ==
- Kate Spade, fashion designer
- Lauren Fowlkes, defender United States U-23 Women's National Soccer Team and Philadelphia Independence
- Dorian Bailey, midfielder United States U-17 Women's National Soccer Team, United States U-23 Women's National Soccer Team and Washington Spirit
- Juana Summers, co-host of NPR's All Things Considered
