= Mama Makes Up Her Mind =

1993 autobiography by Bailey White

Mama Makes Up Her Mind: And Other Dangers of Southern Living
- First edition
- Author: Bailey White
- Published: 1993
- Publisher: Addison-Wesley
- ISBN: 978-0-201-63295-8

Mama Makes Up Her Mind: And Other Dangers of Southern Living is a 1993 autobiography by Bailey White. The book is a collection of humorous anecdotes about White's experiences as a first-grade teacher living with her mother in rural Georgia. White originally presented these anecdotes as a series of fifty short pieces for National Public Radio, reading them herself. The book was also serialised in the Boston Globe and the Miami Herald.

== Critical reception ==
Publishers Weekly said readers and radio listeners would enjoy Mama Makes Up Her Mind while Smithsonian said White's book would create her footing alongside other authors of Southern United States.
