= Bailey White =

American writer

- Born: May 31, 1950 (age 76); Thomasville, Georgia
- Education: Florida State University
- Occupations: Author and radio commentator
- Parent(s): Robb White, Rosalie White

June Bailey White (born May 31, 1950) is an American author and a regular radio commentator for the National Public Radio program All Things Considered.

== Biography ==
June Bailey White was born in Thomasville, Georgia, May 31, 1950. She is the daughter of Robb White, who was a fiction writer, and Rosalie White (née Mason), a farmer. White grew up with her mother in Georgia, while her father lived and wrote in Hollywood. Her mother, and her mother's South Georgian eccentricity, have been central to her writing. Her mother died in 1994.

After graduating from Florida State University in 1973, Bailey White moved to California, where she married her father's best friend. After 11 years of marriage, she returned to Georgia where she taught, for more than twenty years, at the school she attended as a girl. Her friend, Daniel Pinkwater, convinced her to submit some commentaries to NPR. Her gravelly voice and gift for portraying the unusual personalities of people in the rural South with gentle wit proved very popular with her NPR audience. In 1999, she left teaching to concentrate on her writing.

White has published four books: Mama Makes Up Her Mind; Sleeping at the Starlite Motel; Quite a Year for Plums; and, in 2008, Nothing with Strings.

== Awards ==
- Georgia Writers Hall of Fame, inducted 2008
