= Sound Reporting =

2008 book by Jonathan Kern

Sound Reporting: The NPR Guide to Audio Journalism and Production
- Author: Jonathan Kern
- Language: English
- Genre: Non-fiction
- Publisher: University of Chicago
- Publication date: 2008
- Publication place: United States

Sound Reporting: The NPR Guide to Audio Journalism and Production is a 2008 book by Jonathan Kern published by the University of Chicago. It concerns National Public Radio.

== Background ==
At the time of publication the author was employed by NPR as a trainer; he previously worked as an executive producer of All Things Considered.

== Contents ==
Rob Quicke of William Paterson University stated that the book's coverage extends to all "[aspects] of audio production and journalism". The book has eighteen chapters and 382 pages total. The initial portion has five chapters: "Sound & Stories," "Fairness," "Writing for Broadcast," "Reporting," and "Field of Producing." The latter part includes chapters about the directing, editing, and production processes and making commentary. The final chapter discusses changes in the radio process due to the introduction of digital technology.

== Reception ==
Donna Seaman of Booklist wrote that the book is "Comprehensive and lucid".

Quicke stated that he "highly recommended" the book.
