= WCBU =

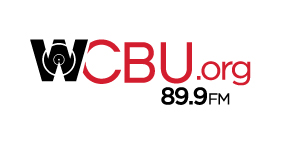
- Peoria, Illinois; United States
- Broadcast area: Central Illinois
- Frequency: 89.9 MHz (HD Radio)
- Branding: Peoria Public Radio

Programming
- Format: News and Information
- Subchannels: HD2: Classical
- Affiliations: NPR, PRX, American Public Media

Ownership
- Owner: Bradley University (operated by Illinois State University under management agreement)
- Sister stations: WGLT

History
- First air date: 1970
- Call sign meaning: Central (Illinois), Bradley University

Technical information
- Licensing authority: FCC
- Facility ID: 6610
- Class: B non-commercial educational
- ERP: 26,500 watts
- HAAT: 197.3 meters (647 ft)
- Transmitter coordinates: 40°37′44.1″N 89°34′12.4″W
- Translators: 103.5 W278AE (Peoria, relays HD2)

Links
- Public license information: Public file; LMS
- Webcast: Listen Live
- Website: wcbu.org

WCBU is a listener-supported, non-commercial public radio station owned by Bradley University in Peoria, Illinois. The station is a National Public Radio affiliate with its studios located on the fourth floor of Morgan Hall on Bradley's campus on West Bradley Avenue and its transmitter located on Cole Street in East Peoria.

WCBU first signed on in 1970. In 2007, WCBU became the first radio station in Central Illinois to offer a second channel of separate classical programming for listeners with HD Radio receivers.

In April 2019, Illinois State University, owner of Central Illinois' other NPR member, WGLT, and Bradley University signed an agreement in which ISU assumed operations of WCBU starting June 1, 2019. WCBU will continue to run broadcast operations on the Bradley campus and will keep the WCBU call letters and 89.9 FM frequency. ISU will manage WCBU's personnel operations. WGLT's translator signal at 103.5 FM in Peoria, which had simulcast WGLT's signal, will simulcast WCBU-HD2's classical music format.

== Programming ==
WCBU, Peoria Public Radio offers a wide variety of news and music programs on both its main and HD channels. Both channels can be heard via a live web streaming.

The station's main channel airs news and information and entertainment programming, including NPR's top news programs, All Things Considered, Morning Edition, Weekend Edition, 1A, Wait Wait... Don't Tell Me! and Here & Now.

Some of the station's local programming:

- On Deck, a morning news podcast featuring WCBU's biggest stories of the day. Available every weekday morning and airing on 89.9 FM at 7:44 a.m.
- Out and About, A preview of the upcoming weekend's arts activities in Central Illinois with your host, Jenn Gordon of Arts Partners of Central Illinois.

Classical WCBU HD2 airs a full schedule of classical music. WCBU HD2 can be heard on HD Radio receivers or online.

Some of the station's older, nostalgic, long time listeners consider the period beginning about 1979 and ending about 1986 to be the "Golden Age of WCBU." That period was marked by varying attempts at local programming and productions of varying quality and indeterminate audience appeal.

Programs from that period included "Why Did They Come?" a historical review of the original settlers of the Peoria River Valley. "Why Did They Come?" blended original insight with the radio dramatization. Other locally produced programs included "Pipes on the Prairie" produced and hosted by Terry Solomonson, which featured recordings of historic pipe organs from throughout central and southern Illinois and "The Duke Knight Radio Hour." "The Duke Knight Radio Hour" featured bluegrass and folk artists from around Central Illinois. It became a very popular program and attracted a large radio and live audience. Local musical favorites Applegate and Company, featuring brothers Bob and Dick Applegate, Rich Mitts and Bill Harlan were regulars on the program, which was broadcast live from the Dingeldine Auditorium on Saturday nights. The Non-Commercial Arts and Storage Company, composed of members of Bradley University's nationally recognized speech team, provided comedy sketches and satire.

=== WCBU2 ===
In January 2007, WCBU created a second channel, WCBU2, to listeners with HD radios or access to internet streaming. The original programming concept of WCBU2 was to counter WCBU's main channel programming. If WCBU is airing a news or talk show, WCBU HD2 would be airing music and vice versa. Streaming of WCBU HD2 officially began on February 15, 2007. In March 2011, WCBU programming switched to all news, information, public affairs and entertainment on the main channel (WCBU HD1) and full-time classical music on WCBU HD2, now known as Classical WCBU HD2. As of 2019, the classical station also airs on 103.5 FM, the former translator signal of WGLT.

== WCBU News ==
The WCBU news department currently includes full-time reporters Joe Deacon and Brendan Denison, along with correspondents Steve Stein, Tim Rosenberger, Rich Draeger and Bill Poorman. Since 1999, WCBU News has won several national, regional and state awards for journalistic excellence.
