= John McIlwraith =

John McIlwraith may refer to:

- John McIlwraith (cricketer) (1857–1938), Australian cricketer
- John McIlwraith (businessman) (1828–1902), Scottish-Australian manufacturer and ship owner, brother of Andrew and Thomas McIlwraith
- John McIlwraith (commentator) (?–2006), Scottish-Canadian radio broadcaster, columnist, and commentator
