= Noah Adams =

American radio journalist and author (1942–2026)

- Born: September 15, 1942; Ashland, Kentucky, U.S.
- Died: October 16, 2026 (aged 84); Yellow Springs, Ohio, U.S.
- Occupations: Journalist, author
- Years active: 1962–2026
- Notable credit: All Things Considered (NPR)

Noah Donald Adams (September 15, 1942 – October 16, 2026) was an American broadcast journalist and author, known primarily from 1987 for his association with National Public Radio.

== Career ==
A co-host of the daily All Things Considered program from 1982 to 1987, and again from 1989 to 2002, Adams later became a contributing correspondent at the network's National Desk. His books tended to document a full year in his life, specifically as that year relates to a particular passion or research project. He co-wrote and narrated a documentary called Father Cares: The Last of Jonestown in 1981, which earned the Prix Italia, the Alfred I. duPont-Columbia University Award, and the Major Armstrong Award.

Adams was the host of the nationally syndicated Minnesota Public Radio variety show Good Evening, created in 1987 to replace A Prairie Home Companion after that show left the air. Good Evening ran for less than a year before being canceled; A Prairie Home Companion returned after a several-year hiatus.

== Personal life and death ==
Adams was born in Ashland, Kentucky, on September 15, 1942. He was married to Neenah Ellis, and was a resident of Yellow Springs, Ohio.

Noah Adams died at his home in Yellow Springs on October 16, 2026, at the age of 84.

== Bibliography ==
- Saint Croix Notes: River Mornings, Radio Nights (1990)—A collection of Adams' essays.
- Noah Adams on "All Things Considered": A Radio Journal (1992; ISBN 0-393-03043-1)—Follows his work for NPR during the volatile news year of June 4, 1989 to June 4, 1990.
- Piano Lessons: Music, Love, and True Adventures (1997; ISBN 0-385-31821-9)—Documents his struggles and musings on learning how to play the piano at age 51.
- Far Appalachia: Following the New River North (2001; ISBN 0-385-32013-2)—Adams explores and researches the New River, in a journey from North Carolina to West Virginia.
- The Flyers: In Search of Wilbur and Orville Wright (2003; ISBN 0-609-81032-4)—Adams narrates the history of the Wright brothers' early aviation years by visiting the sites where history had been made.
