= How to Do Everything =

2011 podcast by NPR

Presentation
- Hosted by: Mike Danforth and Ian Chillag
- Genre: Comedy
- Language: English

Publication
- Original release: 2011
- Provider: NPR

Related
- Website: www.npr.org/podcasts/510384/how-to-do-everything

How to Do Everything is a podcast produced by NPR and hosted by Mike Danforth and Ian Chillag. The show ran from 2011 to 2016 before returning in late 2024.

== Overview ==
The first episode was released in February 2011. The podcast was hosted by Mike Danforth and Ian Chillag, both producers for the NPR show Wait Wait... Don't Tell Me!. The podcast was well received upon release and was awarded Best Podcast in 2013 by Chicago Magazine.

The premise of the show is to explain how (typically unusual) things are done. Each show features a guest who is a supposed expert on the episode's topic. Many notable guests have made an appearance, including Sonia Sotomayor and Henry Winkler. Episodes were released every Friday until production ended, and the final episode was released in November 2016. The podcast was revived by NPR in 2024, still featuring Danforth and Chillag as hosts. The podcast's return reportedly features a combination of rereleased and new episodes.
