= WGLT =

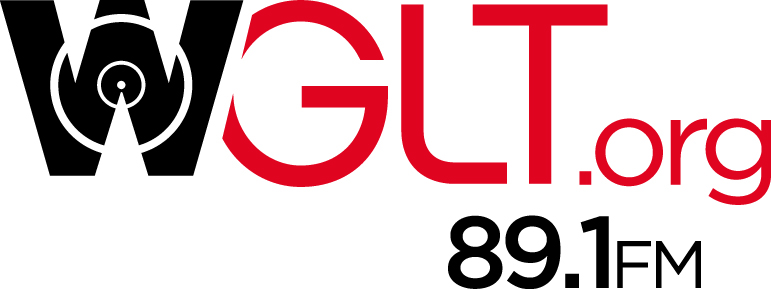
- Normal, Illinois; United States
- Broadcast area: Bloomington-Normal; Peoria, Illinois
- Frequency: 89.1 MHz (HD Radio)
- Branding: WGLT

Programming
- Format: News, Blues
- Affiliations: NPR, PRI, APM

Ownership
- Owner: Illinois State University
- Sister stations: WCBU

History
- First air date: February 6, 1966
- Call sign meaning: Gladly we Learn and Teach (Illinois State University motto)

Technical information
- Licensing authority: FCC
- Facility ID: 28310
- Class: B non-commercial educational
- Power: 8.8 kW
- ERP: 25,000 watts
- HAAT: 115 meters (377 ft)
- Transmitter coordinates: 40°28′46.1″N 89°03′12.3″W

Links
- Public license information: Public file; LMS
- Webcast: Listen live
- Website: www.wglt.org

WGLT is a public radio station owned by Illinois State University and broadcasting on 89.1 MHz at Normal, Illinois. It broadcasts primarily local news and NPR programs, plus music in the evenings and on weekends.

The station's studio is in the WGLT-Vidette Building on the campus of Illinois State University on West Locust Street in Normal, and its transmitter is located on Washington Road in Bloomington. Its callsign comes from the motto of Illinois State University: "Gladly we Learn and Teach", originally "and gladly wold he lerne and gladly teche", from line 309 of The Canterbury Tales.

== History ==
WGLT signed on the air on February 6, 1966, with only 10 watts of power and a studio in Cook Hall. It was originally student-run and heard only in the dorms. WGLT increased power to 2,300 watts and became a full-powered NPR station in July 1976, and increased power to 25,000 watts effective radiated power and adopted jazz as its daytime format in August 1992.

On August 5, 2013, WGLT dropped jazz programming from its daytime schedule to concentrate on news/talk full time. Its marquee daily newsmagazine show is "Sound Ideas," airing every weekday.

In April 2019, Illinois State University and Bradley University signed an agreement in which WGLT assumed operations of WCBU in Peoria starting June 1, 2019. WGLT's translator signal at 103.5 FM in Peoria, which had simulcast WGLT's signal, will simulcast WCBU-HD2's classical music format.

Over the decades, WGLT News has been honored with scores of regional and national awards for excellence by the Associated Press, Kaleidoscope, Public Radio News Directors, Inc and the prestigious Edward R. Murrow awards from the Radio Television Digital News Association.
