= John McIlwraith (commentator) =

- Born: Glasgow, Scotland
- Died: 30 June 2006
- Occupations: Newspaper columnist Radio broadcaster

John McIlwraith (died 30 June 2006) was a Scottish-Canadian humorist, radio broadcaster, newspaper columnist, and commentator.

== Early life and career ==
McIlwraith was born in Glasgow, Scotland, but moved to Vancouver, British Columbia as a young adult. His jobs included working as a coal-stoker on a ferry operated by the Canadian Pacific Railway.

McIlwraith hosted a morning radio program in Seattle and wrote columns for newspapers and magazines. From 1990 to 2001, he recorded commentaries for National Public Radio's All Things Considered.

After Carnegie Mellon University announced that it would begin offering a degree in the playing of bagpipes, McIlwraith commented that the bagpipe was created as an instrument of war, and should not be treated as a musical instrument. McIlwraith said:

The Scots are a race not noted for their music. The favorite instrument in Scotland is the piano accordion, followed by the fiddle. The next favorite would be the harmonica. Even the Scots consider the bagpipes to be an instrument of torture, of warfare, its practitioners huge, red-faced farmer types who have switched from pig sticking to bagpipe playing.

Bagpipes are a strange instrument. The only reason they were invented is the Scots needed some kind of noise to rally the clans when the English crossed the border. They could have bought a bell or a whistle, but being a thrifty people they took a pig's bladder and stuck a reed in it and the rest is history. For some reason, great masses of people have mistaken bagpipes for a musical instrument.

After each commentary, the All Things Considered host noted that McIlwraith lived on a houseboat in San Diego, California.

Other commentaries by McIlwraith include:

- "Doing It in the Closet" (20 December 2007): part of Tinsel Tales, a series of Christmas stories
- "Jesse the Incorrigible: My Grandson" (30 December 1997): recounting his experiences with a grandson suffering from attention deficit disorder
- "A Party for an Endangered Organ" (27 March 2001): recorded just before undergoing surgery for stomach cancer

He was married twice, to Bridie and then to Dixie. He had four children.

McIlwraith's death resulted from complications arising from dementia with Lewy bodies.

Years after McIlwraith's death, his brother-in-law wrote a column for the Chicago Reader questioning whether McIlwraith's stories were strictly factual.
