= Lisa Simeone =

American freelance radio host and writer

- Education: St. John's College; Johns Hopkins University
- Occupations: Freelance radio host; writer

Lisa Simeone is an American freelance radio host and writer. She is best known for hosting public radio shows such as World of Opera and the Chicago Symphony Orchestra weekly broadcast series.

== Early life and education ==
Simeone attended St. John's College in Annapolis, Maryland, where she graduated in 1980 with a bachelor's degree in liberal arts. Later on, studying at the Writing Seminars at Johns Hopkins University, she received a master's degree in 1997.

== Career ==
Simeone began her radio career as a classical music host at WBJC in Baltimore, moving on to WETA in Washington, D.C., and then to WJHU in Baltimore. In 1996, after ten years at WJHU, where her programming included classical, folk, and jazz music, plus a wide variety of reports, interviews, and call-in programs on intriguing topics, she left to pursue a graduate degree in writing.

From 1998 to 2000, she was a regular host of NPR's Performance Today and Weekend Edition Sunday. She became full-time host of NPR's Weekend All Things Considered in 2000. She left the show in March 2002 to return to freelancing, and shortly afterwards began hosting NPR's World of Opera. She also returned to hosting and writing for the independent radio documentary series Soundprint, which she had done before she was hired at Weekend All Things Considered. In 2007, she also began hosting the weekly Chicago Symphony Orchestra broadcast series, produced and syndicated by the Chicago radio service WFMT.

In October 2011, Simeone became involved in the Occupy movement. Because of this activity, she was fired from Soundprint on October 19, 2011. The firing was for alleged NPR ethics code violations, which prohibit political activism by journalists, though she was not working for NPR at the time in any capacity nor receiving any salary or payment from the network, and Soundprint was not an NPR program. She was also not a news reporter. According to The Huffington Post:

Simeone, who lives in Baltimore, said she has been serving with about 50 people on a steering committee for an occupation protest on Pennsylvania Avenue [in Washington, D.C.] that's known as the October 2011 Movement. She said it is not connected to the Occupy Wall Street movement, but that they share similar philosophies.

Following Simeone's firing from Soundprint, NPR also stopped distributing World of Opera. WDAV, which produces the show, immediately began distributing the program itself. Simeone remained as host until the show ended in December 2016.

Simeone has written for the Baltimore City Paper, The Urbanite, and The Baltimore Sun, and is the beauty editor and a columnist at Baltimore Style. She has also done voice-overs, narrations, and hosting for the Discovery Channel, PBS, and other networks.

== Personal life ==
Simeone lives in Baltimore, Maryland. She is a lifelong political activist. One of her volunteer activities is running the civil liberties watchdog site TSA News, which tracks the abuses committed by the Transportation Security Administration.
