= Robert Conley (reporter) =

American journalist (1928–2013)

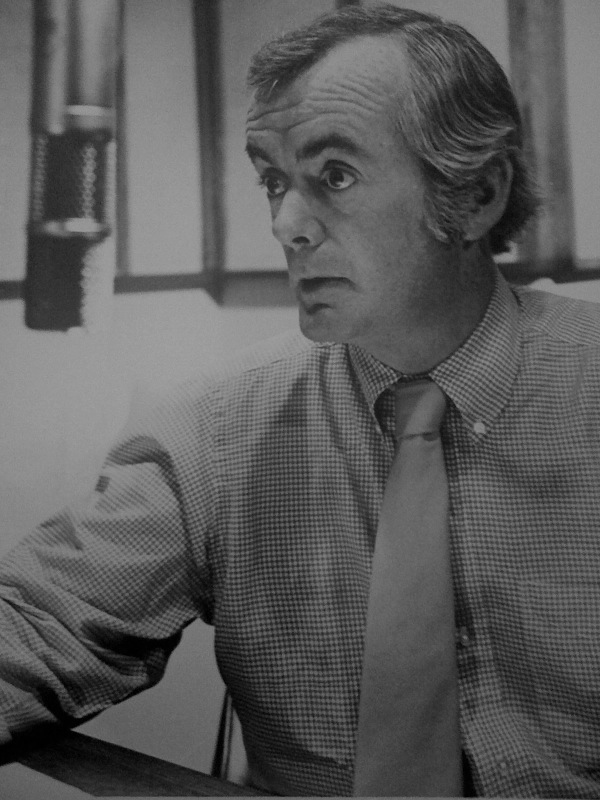
- Conley at the microphone at NPR
- Born: May 8, 1928
- Died: November 16, 2013 (aged 85)
- Resting place: Quantico National Cemetery
- Spouse: Mary Jane

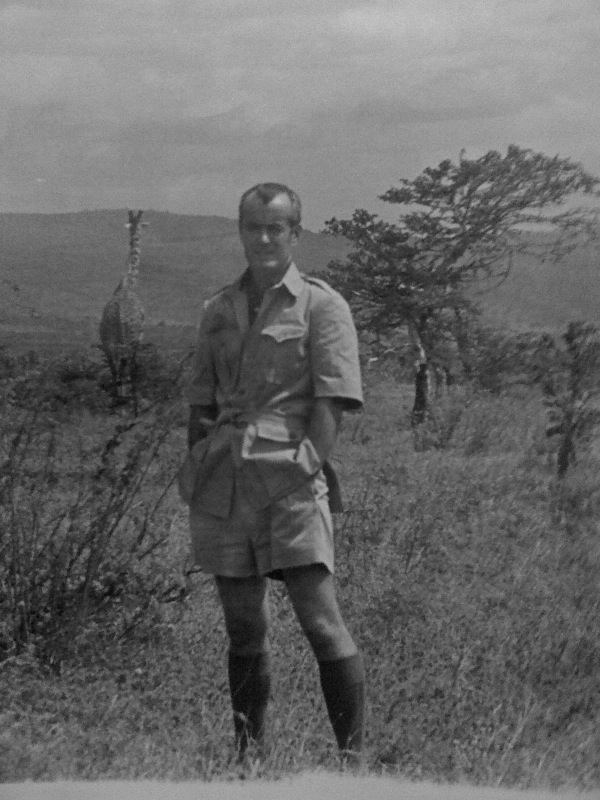
Conley in Kenya with a giraffe in the background

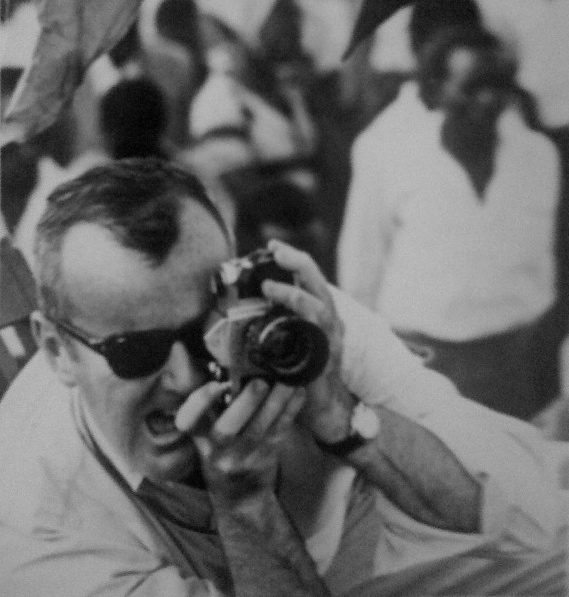
Conley in Kenya

Robert Conley (May 8, 1928 – November 16, 2013) was an American newspaper, television and radio reporter.

== Overview ==
Conley was a foreign correspondent for The New York Times in the 1950s and 1960s, bureau chief for NBC News, Africa, as well as a foreign correspondent for NBC News' The Huntley-Brinkley Report throughout the 1960s, editor for and contributor to National Geographic magazine in the late 1960s to early 1970s, and first host of the groundbreaking and popular Peabody Award-winning National Public Radio (NPR) radio news and cultural program All Things Considered in the 1970s.

He appeared on and conducted interviews on such shows as Today Show, Face the Nation and on the channel C-SPAN.

In 2016, the first broadcast of All Things Considered, hosted by Conley, was inducted into the National Recording Registry of the Library of Congress.

== Career ==
=== The New York Times ===
Before going overseas for The New York Times, Conley was first based in New York City, reporting on national events, often for the front page. As major news events in Africa began to develop throughout the 1960s, The Times made Conley its foreign correspondent for Africa, based in Nairobi, Kenya.

=== NBC News and The Huntley-Brinkley Report ===
In the mid-1960s, NBC News hired Conley as bureau chief of its Africa bureau. From its base in Nairobi, Conley traveled across the African continent, covering events and filing stories for NBC News and its affiliated programs such as The Huntley-Brinkley Report. Conley's news beat took him from Angola to Zanzibar, in a time when overseas news bureaus for the United States were not so ubiquitous as in later times.

=== NPR and All Things Considered ===
National Public Radio (NPR) was incorporated on February 26, 1970, following the passage of the Public Broadcasting Act of 1967, passage of which was aided by Conley testifying before Congress, that established the Corporation for Public Broadcasting and also led to the creation of the Public Broadcasting Service (PBS).

All Things Considered made its debut on May 3, 1971, broadcasting in 32 states, Conley as the first host. As described in an article by Hal Klopper for the Fall 2006 newsletter of the Carnegie Corporation of New York:

The inaugural broadcast included a report on a 26-year-old woman's attempts to deal with heroin addiction; a report from Ames, Iowa, on a novel means of supplementing business at a barbershop (shaving women's legs); a discussion with two NPR reporters and a correspondent from the Christian Science Monitor regarding that day's massive protest in Washington, D.C. against U.S. involvement in the Vietnam War; the reading of three antiwar poems; and a conversation between the poet Allen Ginsberg and his father about the legality of drugs. The show began, though, with a remarkable and dramatic 20-minute sound montage of the demonstration in Washington introduced by All Things Considered's first host, former New York Times staff member and NBC correspondent Robert Conley.

In 2016, the first show of All Things Considered, hosted by Conley, was inducted into the National Recording Registry of the Library of Congress for its "cultural, artistic and historical importance to American society and the nation's audio heritage."

"All Things Considered," first broadcast (May 3, 1971) The National Public Radio flagship news program All Things Considered launched on May 3, 1971, one month after the network itself began broadcasting. With an emphasis on "interpretation, investigative reporting on public affairs, the world of ideas and the arts," in the words of programming head Bill Siemering, "All Things Considered" aimed to give voice to diverse segments of American society in a relaxed, conversational mode. The first broadcast, however, featuring recorded excerpts from a huge antiwar protest in the nation's capital that took place the same day, was "raw, visceral, and took listeners to the heart of America's agonies over the war in Vietnam," remembered Susan Stamberg, an NPR staffer at the time, who became a co-host of the show the following year. While the inaugural program was broadcast to approximately 90 stations across the nation, reaching only a few hundred thousand listeners, "All Things Considered" has since become, according to NPR, "the most listened-to afternoon drive-time news radio program in the country."

== Personal life ==
He married Mary Jane (Samborski), and with her had five children—Jonathan, Dermot, Helen, Andrew, and Shelagh, and three grandchildren, Mark, Matthew, and Daniel.

== Death ==
Born in Massachusetts, Conley died at age 85 from parotid cancer, in Virginia. He was buried at Quantico National Cemetery.
