= Kevin Klose =

American journalist and author (1940–2026)

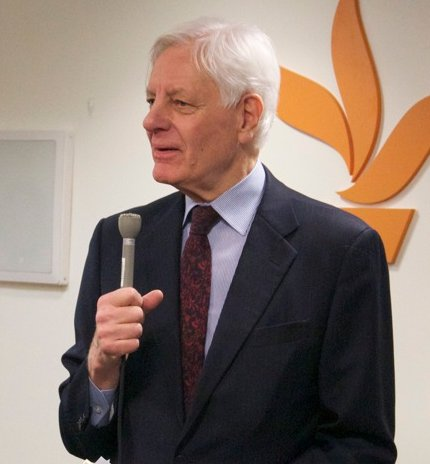
- Born: September 1, 1940; Toronto, Ontario, Canada
- Died: April 17, 2026 (aged 85); Washington, D.C., U.S.
- Education: Harvard University
- Occupations: Journalist; author; executive

Kevin Klose (September 1, 1940 – April 15, 2026) was a Canadian-American journalist, author, broadcast executive and academic administrator who served as president of National Public Radio for almost a decade, overseeing a major growth era for the service.

== Life and career ==
Born in Toronto, Ontario, Canada, Klose grew up in Red Hook, New York. His parents, Woody and Virginia Taylor Klose, were radio producers and writers during the 1930s and 1940s.

Klose was a graduate of Harvard University, earning a Bachelor of Arts degree, cum laude, in 1962. He authored five books, including Russia and the Russians: Inside the Closed Society.

For 25 years Klose was a reporter and editor at The Washington Post. From 1977 to 1981 he served as Moscow Bureau Chief.

He served successively as director of U.S. international broadcasting, overseeing the U.S. Government's global radio and television news services (1997–98) and president of Radio Free Europe/Radio Liberty (RFE/RL), broadcasting to Central Europe and the former Soviet Union (1994–97). He joined RFE/RL in 1992 as director of Radio Liberty, broadcasting to the former Soviet Union in its national languages. Among his achievements, he relocated RFE/RL from Munich to Prague and helped devise and implement a strategy to refocus the mission of all U.S.-funded international broadcasting and update operations.

From 1998 to September 2008 Klose was president of National Public Radio (NPR), the United States' largest nonprofit radio outlet for news and cultural programming. He served in this position beginning in December 1998, and also served as the organization's chief executive officer from 1998 to 1999. He was also a member of NPR's corporate board of directors, and a Trustee of the NPR Foundation. In 2008 he was named president emeritus.

Klose also served on the advisory board of the University of Southern California Center on Public Diplomacy and the nonprofit America Abroad Media.

He served as dean of the Philip Merrill College of Journalism at the University of Maryland, College Park, from April 2009 to July 2012 and was a tenured professor.

Klose served as president and CEO of Radio Free Europe/Radio Liberty from 2012 to 2014. He died in Washington, D.C., from complications of Alzheimer's disease on April 15, 2026, at the age of 85.

== Published works ==
- Russia and the Russians. W. W. Norton & Company. 1984. ISBN 978-0393303124. (1986 paperback).
- Typhoon Shipments. W. W. Norton & Company. 1980. ISBN 978-0393335880.
