= Association of Public Radio Stations =

The Association of Public Radio Stations was a radio network in the United States from 1973 to 1977.

It was formed on May 24, 1973, becoming the main public radio representative to federal agencies and Congress. In 1977 it merged with National Public Radio (NPR), which was then primarily a distributor of radio content. It was only after this merger that NPR became the broader public radio body it is today.

== See also ==
- America's Public Television Stations: A similar trade organization for non-profit TV
