= NPR Berlin =

- Berlin; Germany
- Frequency: 104.1 MHz

Programming
- Language: English

Ownership
- Owner: NPR Media Berlin gGmbH (a German nonprofit)

History
- First air date: April 2006
- Last air date: 15 October 2017

Links
- Webcast: Listen live
- Website: nprberlin.de (defunct), archived October 2017

NPR Berlin was the first international affiliate of the American public radio network, NPR. The station started broadcasting in April 2006. It replaced a radio station from Voice of America that previously broadcast on the 104.1 MHz frequency. The affiliate was operated by NPR Media Berlin gGmbH, a German nonprofit organization of which NPR is the sole shareholder. NPR Berlin was in the unique position of being the only NPR affiliate with a broadcast area outside the United States. Although stations in the Armed Forces Network also carry some NPR programming, they are not NPR affiliates. The station was at the time the only NPR station directly operated by NPR itself. A web stream launched on 2 August 2010 and ended on 2 October 2017.

== Financing ==
Much like NPR stations in the States, the station depended on tax-deductible donations from its listeners to operate. Pledge drives took place twice a year. If the station fell short on listener funding, the difference was made up by NPR headquarters. In 2010, the station's pledge drive resulted in 92 listeners donating around €8,000 (equivalent to €9,411 in 2021).

NPR spent $181,443 (equivalent to $246,450 in 2025) on the station in fiscal year 2015. NPR's financial statements published in December 2016 included the following statement about their operations in Berlin:

Management is pursuing options that will reduce the financial subsidy provided by NPR Inc. to NPR Media Berlin, including relinquishing the FM radio station license and closing NPR Media Berlin."

== Programming ==
Most of NPR Berlin's schedule consisted of syndicated NPR programming and some live shows. Its original content was limited to a show called Berlin Journal (airing infrequently) and features like Events Calendar, Life in Berlin and Berlin Stories. The station also carried some English-language output from partners like Deutsche Welle.

== Shutdown ==
In the first quarter of 2017, NPR returned its broadcast license to the regulator, Medienanstalt Berlin-Brandenburg (MABB), to take effect as of 1 October 2017. NPR planned to become solely a content provider to the station. The station's broadcasting license was originally planned to last until 31 March 2020. MABB invited tenders for a new operator of the frequency on 12 April 2017. The new license was valid for a maximum of seven years.

MABB awarded the frequency to KCRW Berlin on 14 September 2017. It began broadcasting on 16 October 2017 and the schedule was expected to include locally produced speech and music programming. Some NPR magazine content such as All Things Considered and Morning Edition were still part of the schedule. KCRW Berlin, which closed in 2020, was a subsidiary of 89.9 KCRW in Santa Monica - Los Angeles.
