= Mary Louise Kelly =

American journalist (born 1971)

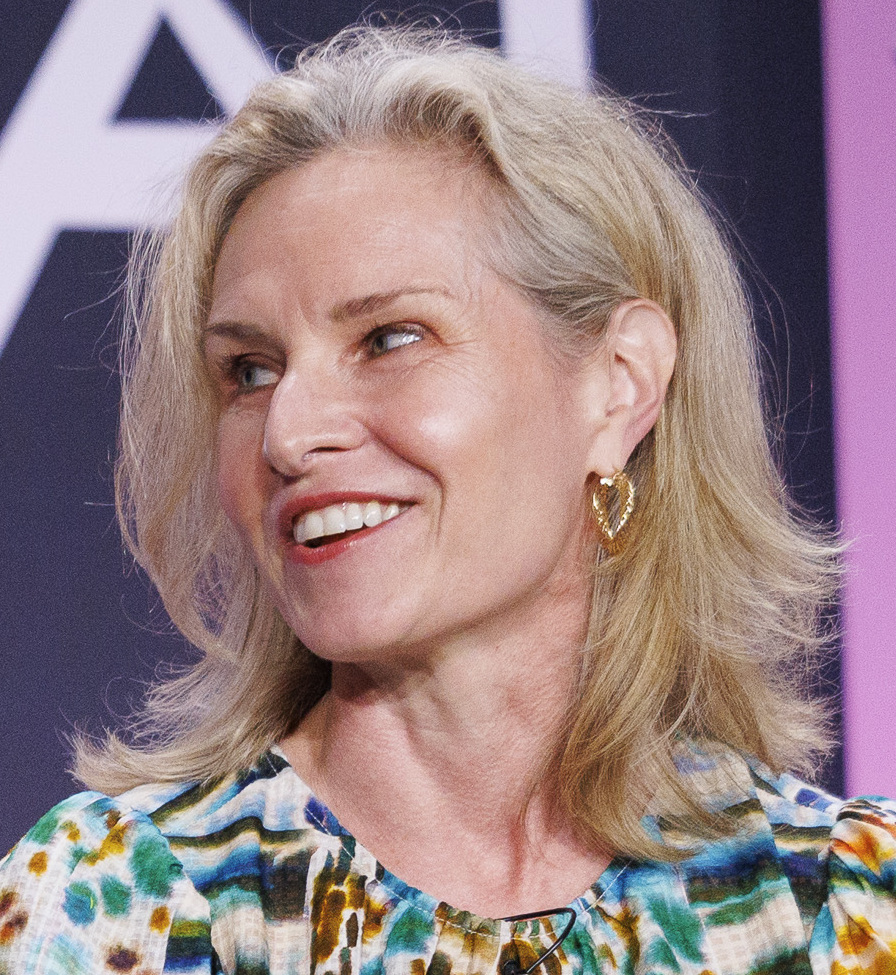
- Kelly in 2023
- Born: Augsburg, West Germany
- Education: Harvard University (BA); Emmanuel College, Cambridge (MPhil)
- Occupations: Journalist, novelist
- Spouse: Nick Boyle (m. 1997; div. 2023)
- Writing career
- Genres: Crime fiction, thriller, memoir
- Website: marylouisekellybooks.com

Mary Louise Kelly (born 1971) is an American broadcaster and author. She is the former anchor of the National Public Radio (NPR) daily news show All Things Considered and the network’s national security podcast Sources & Methods. Prior to NPR she reported for CNN and the BBC in London. Her writing has appeared in The New York Times, The Washington Post, The Wall Street Journal, Newsweek, The Atlantic, and other publications. Her first novel, Anonymous Sources, was published in 2013; her second, The Bullet, in 2015; and her memoir, It. Goes. So. Fast.: The Year of No Do-Overs, in 2023.

== Background and education ==
Mary Louise Kelly was born in Augsburg, West Germany, the daughter of Carol (White) and James Patrick Kelly. While her father was attending Harvard University, he was drafted out of law school into the United States Army. He and Carol moved to Augsburg, Germany, where Mary Louise was born in an Army field hospital. James served as a captain from 1968 to 1972.

Mary Louise Kelly grew up in Atlanta, Georgia. She graduated magna cum laude from Harvard University in 1993, studying government, French language, and literature. As a senior editor at The Harvard Crimson, she covered the 1992 presidential election and the first inauguration of President Bill Clinton.

In 1993, she landed her first job in reporting at The Atlanta Journal-Constitution, where she stayed for a year before leaving for the U.K. to pursue a second degree. In 1995, she graduated with a master's in European studies from Emmanuel College, Cambridge. During that same academic year she interned with the BBC in Glasgow and London.

== Career ==
Kelly's first post-college job was reporting on local politics for her hometown newspaper, The Atlanta Journal-Constitution. After her post-graduate studies in Cambridge, England, and internships at the British Broadcasting Corporation (BBC) in Scotland and London, Kelly joined the Boston team that launched the radio news magazine The World, a joint venture between the BBC and Public Radio International.

The following year, Kelly returned to the United Kingdom, working as a host, foreign correspondent and senior producer for the BBC World Service, and as a producer at CNN in London. Kelly reported from the Afghan-Pakistan border, radical Hamburg mosques, Kosovo refugee camps, and the deck of an aircraft carrier. At the BBC, she covered the peace talks that ended The Troubles in Northern Ireland.

Kelly returned to the United States in 2001 to join National Public Radio in Washington, D.C. For three years, she edited NPR's evening news magazine, All Things Considered. The NPR website described her as a "bad-ass babe on breaking news".

In 2004, Kelly launched NPR's intelligence beat, reporting on spy agencies like the Central Intelligence Agency (CIA), the Defense Intelligence Agency, and the National Security Agency. In 2005, Kelly became the first reporter to interview Gary Schroen, the CIA operative who was dropped into Afghanistan in the aftermath of the September 11 attacks with a six-man team and a directive to bring back the head of Osama bin Laden. In 2006, Kelly broke the news of the CIA's secret decision to disband the unit aimed at searching for bin Laden. The story caused an uproar and led to the U.S. Senate voting on September 8, 2006, to reinstate the unit.

From January 2009 to 2011, Kelly served as NPR's senior Pentagon correspondent, reporting on defense and foreign policy issues. As part of NPR's national security team, Kelly covered the Obama administration's approach to the wars in Afghanistan and the Iraq War. She also focused on how the U.S. projected its military power elsewhere in the world; how the U.S. reacted to, and dealt with, the emerging global military muscle of countries such as China; and the way in which U.S. foreign policy goals are often sought, and sometimes achieved, through defense and Intelligence agency channels.

From 2011 to 2014, Kelly focused on writing novels and raising her sons, moving twice to live in Florence, Italy. She became a contributing editor at The Atlantic magazine in 2014, hosting multiple live events including the Aspen Ideas Festival, The Washington Ideas Forum and CityLab London.

In 2016, Kelly returned to NPR as national security correspondent and guest host of Morning Edition and All Things Considered. She continued as a contributing editor at The Atlantic magazine and worked on a third novel.

In January 2018, Kelly took over as anchor of flagship daily news show All Things Considered, following the retirement of Robert Siegel.. She stepped down as anchor of All Things Considered on November 6, 2026.

U.S. Secretary of State Mike Pompeo ended an interview with Kelly abruptly on January 24, 2020, and called her to his private quarters without a recorder, where, in a "profanity-laced rant," he rebuked her for asking questions regarding Ukraine during the interview. The interview transcript was posted to the State Department's website. Pompeo said the incident was "another example of how unhinged the media has become in its quest to hurt President Trump and this administration," and claimed that Kelly had lied about whether Ukraine would be covered and whether the post-interview conversation would be off the record. However, emails sent between Kelly and Pompeo's staff contradicted Pompeo's claim. Taking his cue from Fox News personality Mark Levin, President Donald Trump later threatened to eliminate funding for NPR. Trump praised Pompeo. "That's impressive Mike," Trump said. "That reporter couldn't have done too good a job on you." Pausing, he added, "I think you did a good job on her, actually."

Kelly was also the inaugural host of NPR's national security podcast Sources & Methods, which was launched in August of 2025, until she stepped down in November of 2026. She was elected to a six-year term on the Harvard Board of Overseers in 2025. Kelly has served for many years as an adjunct professor at Georgetown University, teaching classes in national security and journalism.

== Books ==
Kelly's political spy thriller novel, Anonymous Sources (ISBN 978-1-4767-1554-4), was published in 2013 by Simon & Schuster. In it, journalist Alexandra James investigates a clandestine nuclear plot.

Her second novel, The Bullet (ISBN 978-1-4767-6981-3), appeared in March 2015. The protagonist, Caroline Cashion, a professor at Georgetown University, finds a bullet lodged in her neck and sets out to unravel the mystery.

She published her memoir, It. Goes. So. Fast.: The Year of No Do-Overs (Henry Holt and Co., ISBN 978-1250859853; OCLC 1352482165), on April 11, 2023.

== Personal life ==
Kelly was married until 2023 to Nicholas Boyle, a litigator and partner at the international law firm Latham & Watkins. They have two sons, James and Alexander.

Kelly developed significant hearing loss in her forties.
