= Kelly McEvers =

American journalist

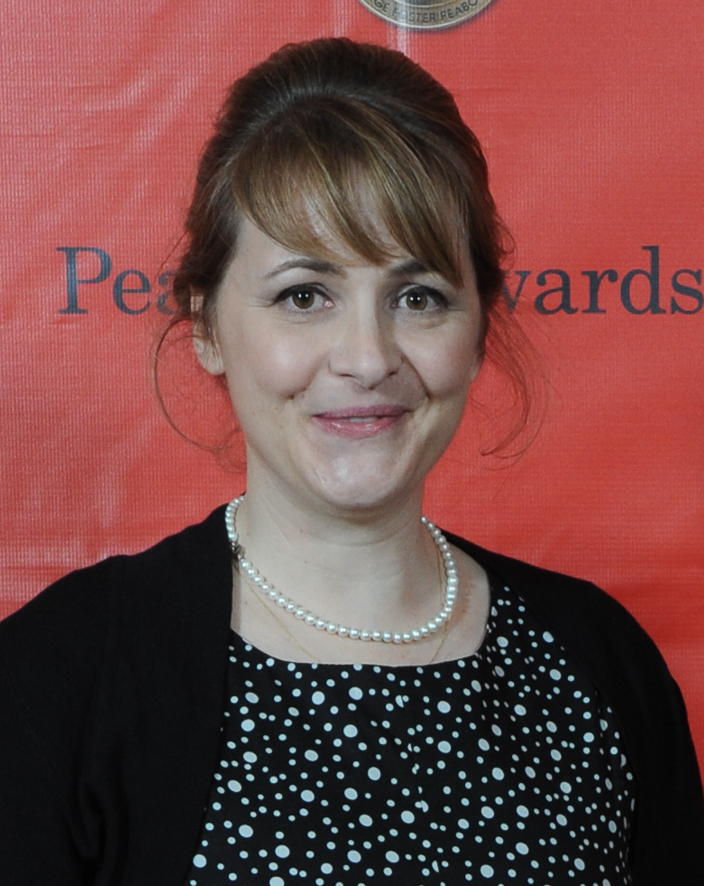
- McEvers in 2013
- Born: 1969 or 1970 (age 56–57)
- Occupation: Journalist
- Known for: All Things Considered
- Spouse: Nathan Deuel
- Children: 1

Kelly McEvers is an American journalist. McEvers is host of NPR's "Embedded" podcast. She was a co-host of NPR's flagship newsmagazine All Things Considered until February 2018 . Before this she was a foreign correspondent for NPR, in which she covered momentous international events including the withdrawal of American troops from Iraq, Middle East uprisings associated with the Arab Spring, and the Syrian civil war.

== Career ==
McEvers graduated from Lincoln Community High School in 1988. McEvers began her career as a reporter for the Chicago Tribune in 1997. She went on to cover Cambodia for the BBC in 1999–2000, then Indonesia, Malaysia and Singapore after 9/11 as an independent reporter. During the next several years, she continued to work as a freelance journalist in other areas of the world. McEvers covered the former Soviet Union from 2004 to 2006 for PRI's The World, in the course of which she was detained by Russian security forces.

From 2007 to 2009, she helped produce the award-winning series "Working" for the radio program Marketplace, filing several stories on topics ranging from sex workers in Azerbaijan to bankers in Dubai.

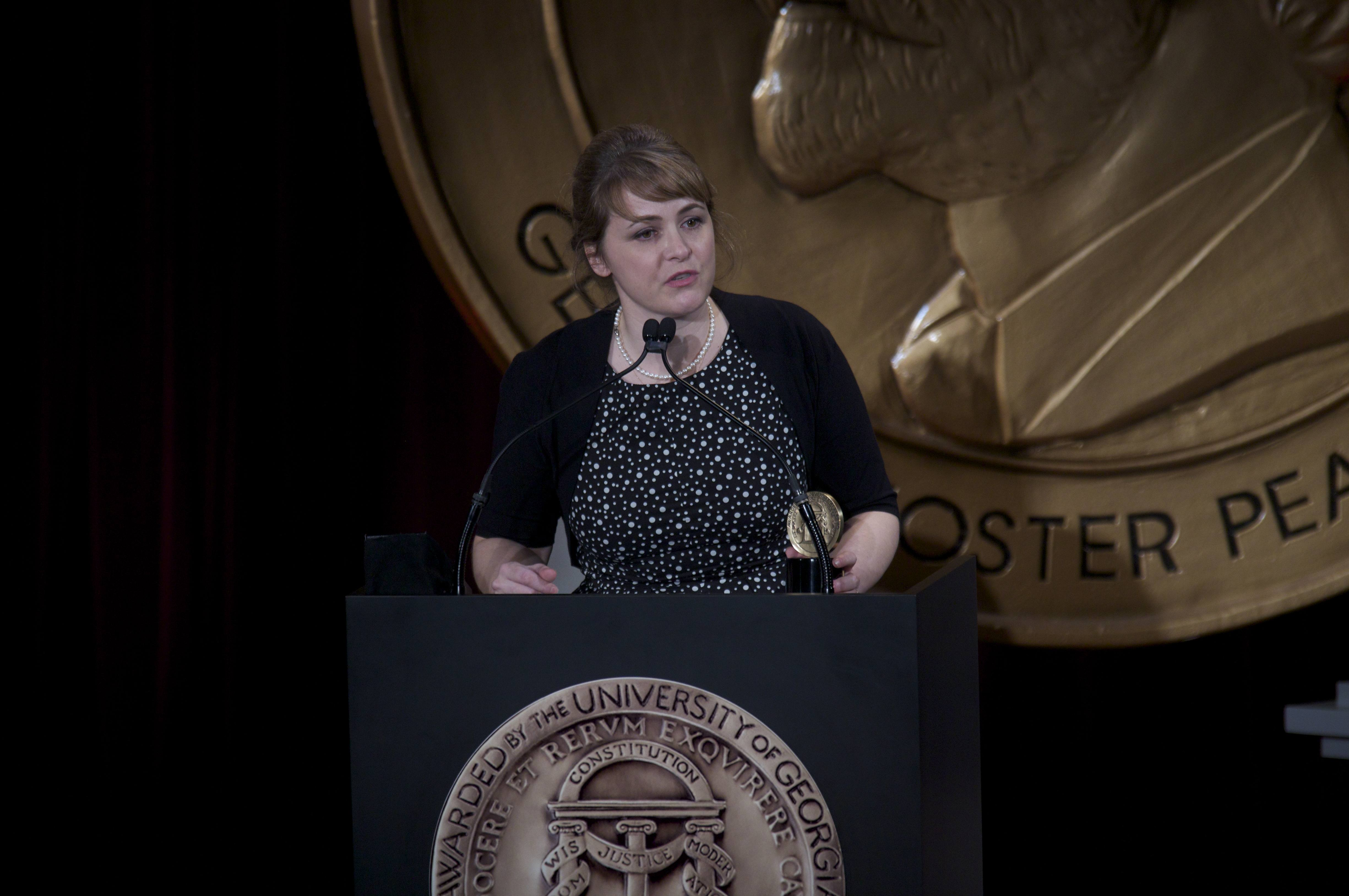
McEvers at the 72nd Peabody Awards, 2013

McEvers has covered the Middle East as an independent journalist and for NPR, from Saudi Arabia to Iraq in 2010, then at various locations in 2011 during the Arab Spring. She moved to Beirut in 2012. In 2013, she made a radio documentary about her time as a war correspondent called Diary of a Bad Year.

On September 21, 2015, McEvers joined NPR's All Things Considered as a co-host. In 2016, she became the host of NPR podcast Embedded.

McEvers has also written for the Christian Science Monitor, New York Times Magazine, Esquire, Foreign Policy. The New Republic, Slate, The Washington Monthly, and the San Francisco Chronicle.

She was a fellow at the International Center for Journalists.

McEvers began co-hosting the Atlas Obscura podcast in October 2025.

== Personal life ==
McEvers was born in Lincoln, Illinois. She has a B.A. from the University of Illinois Urbana-Champaign, and an M.S. in journalism from Northwestern University.

She is married to Nathan Deuel, who is also a reporter and writer, and they have one daughter.
