= Juana Summers =

American radio journalist (born 1988 or 1989)

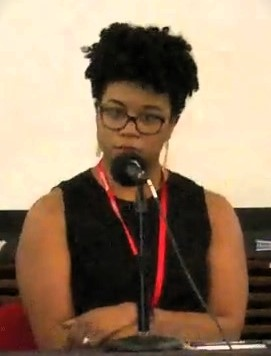
- Summers in 2018
- Born: 1988 or 1989 (age 37–38); Kansas City, Missouri
- Education: University of Missouri
- Occupation: Radio journalist
- Years active: 2010–present
- Employer: NPR

Juana Summers (born 1988 or 1989) is an American radio journalist. In June 2022, she became one of four co-hosts for NPR's afternoon drive-time news program All Things Considered. She was previously a political reporter for NPR and the Associated Press.

== Early life and education ==
Summers, who is of African American heritage, is from Kansas City, Missouri. She attended St. Teresa's Academy, where she wrote for The Dart student newspaper. As a teenager, she earned her first journalism byline reporting for The Kansas City Star's teen section.

She attended the Missouri School of Journalism, graduating in 2009 with a bachelor's degree in media convergence and a minor in history. While a student at Mizzou, she covered the running-mate announcements for presidential candidates Barack Obama and John McCain.

== Career ==
Summers started in public radio at KBIA, the NPR member station in Columbia, Missouri, as a University of Missouri student. After graduating, she interned at the St. Louis Post-Dispatch before returning to the Kansas City Star to cover politics.

She covered the 2012 presidential race for Politico, then reported on education and politics for NPR. In 2015, she became politics editor at Mashable. She reported and edited at CNN before joining the Associated Press in September 2018, then returning to NPR.

As a political reporter and correspondent for NPR, Summers covered Congress, presidential elections, race and the justice system.

In fall 2016, Summers was a fellow at Georgetown University's Institute of Politics and Public Service.

Summers filled in as host on All Things Considered a few times in March 2022 before her permanent selection was announced. She replaced Audie Cornish, who departed for CNN, as co-host.

== Personal life ==
Summers is married and a step-parent. She moved to Baltimore in 2015, where she plays competitive pinball. She is a certified weightlifting coach.
