= Scott Detrow =

American radio journalist

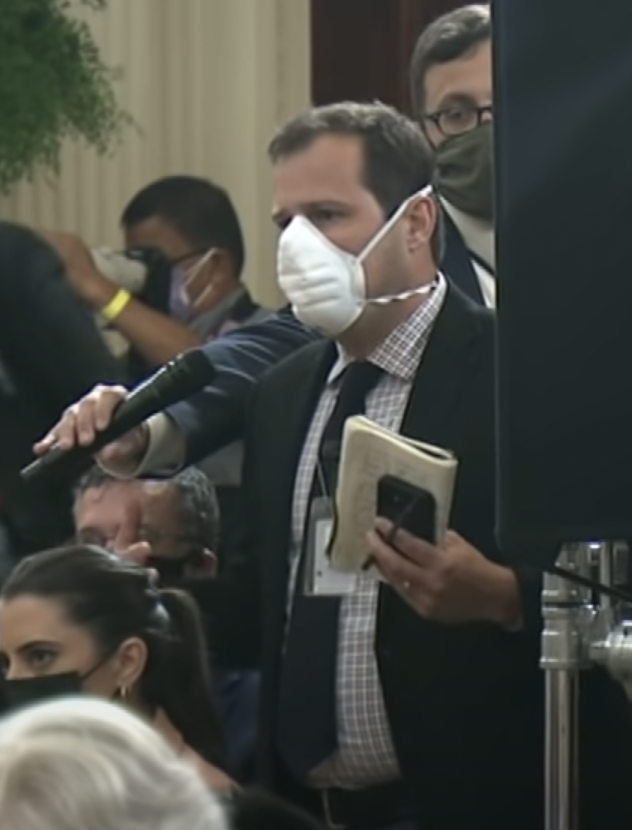
- Detrow questions President Joe Biden at a 2021 White House briefing
- Education: Fordham University (BA); University of Pennsylvania (MPA)
- Occupation: Journalist
- Years active: 2006–present
- Employer: NPR
- Title: Host of All Things Considered

Scott Detrow (/ˈdɛtroʊ/) is an American radio journalist who is the co-host of All Things Considered, NPR's afternoon newsmagazine. He previously hosted the weekend broadcast of All Things Considered. Before that he served as an NPR White House correspondent and co-hosted The NPR Politics Podcast.

Detrow coauthored the 2026 biography American Pope: Leo XIV's Road from the South Side of Chicago to Vatican City.

== Early life and education ==
Detrow grew up in New Jersey and Wisconsin, and graduated from Marquette University High School. He attended Fordham University, graduating in 2007. As a college student, he worked for Fordham's public radio station WFUV. He earned a master's degree from the University of Pennsylvania's Fels Institute of Government.

== Career ==
Detrow began his career as a statehouse reporter for NPR member stations WITF and KQED. He also reported on energy policy in Pennsylvania for NPR's StateImpact project. He won a national Murrow Award for reporting on the deployment of a Pennsylvania National Guard brigade to Iraq. He also won a DuPont-Columbia Silver Baton for covering Pennsylvania's hydraulic fracturing boom.

He joined NPR in 2015, where he covered Congress and the 2016 and 2020 presidential elections. He became a White House correspondent in 2020. In 2021, he produced Sacred Ground, a documentary on the 20th anniversary of the Flight 93 tragedy, in partnership with WITF. In 2022, he guest-hosted All Things Considered on location from Ukraine.

He began hosting All Things Considered's weekend episodes on June 24, 2023, replacing Michel Martin. From November 2023 to November 2024 he hosted Trump's Trials, a limited-run NPR podcast that covered the various criminal proceedings against former President Donald Trump.

In September 2025, after longtime All Things Considered host Ari Shapiro announced his departure from NPR, Detrow was moved from the weekend to the weekday edition of the show.

Detrow regularly hosts NPR's special coverage of major news events, including the 2024 assassination attempt on President Trump, and the 2025 papal conclave that elected Pope Leo XIV. Both of those broadcasts won an Edward R. Murrow Award for Breaking News Coverage.

The conclave coverage led Detrow and NPR religion editor Daniel Burke to write a biography of Pope Leo, American Pope.

== Personal life ==
Detrow is a practicing Catholic and fan of the New York Yankees.
