= Ailsa Chang =

American journalist (born 1976)

- Born: January 12, 1976 (age 50)
- Education: Stanford University (BA, JD); University of Oxford (LLM); Columbia University (MS)
- Occupation: Journalist
- Employer: NPR

Ailsa Chang (Chinese: 張愛莎; pinyin: Zhāng Àishā; born January 12, 1976) is an American journalist. She is a host of the NPR news magazine All Things Considered. She is a former host of Planet Money and previously covered the United States Congress for NPR. Prior to joining NPR in 2012, Chang was an investigative journalist at NPR member station WNYC in New York City. Since starting as a radio reporter in 2009, she has received numerous national awards for investigative reporting.

== Early life and education ==
Chang was born to a Taiwanese American family. She grew up in Los Altos, California, in the San Francisco Bay Area. Her parents were immigrants from Taiwan.

After graduating from Mountain View High School, Chang attended Stanford University and earned a Bachelor of Arts in public policy in 1998. She then earned a Juris Doctor (J.D.) from Stanford Law School in 2001. She was also a Fulbright Scholar at the University of Oxford, earning a master's degree in media law. In 2008, she completed a master's degree in journalism at Columbia University.

== Career ==
Chang served as law clerk to John T. Noonan Jr., a judge of the United States Court of Appeals for the Ninth Circuit.

After five years practicing law, Chang quit her job at age 30. She volunteered as an unpaid intern at NPR member station KQED in San Francisco, where she was living at the time. She returned to school and earned a master's degree in journalism at Columbia University.

After journalism school, Chang joined NPR in 2008 as a Kroc Fellow in Washington D.C., where she wrote an investigative report into the public defender system of Detroit. The piece, which aired on NPR in 2009, was awarded the 2010 Daniel Schorr Journalism Prize.

She returned to KQED as a reporter, before joining WNYC in 2009, where she covered criminal justice, terrorism and the courts. At WNYC, Chang wrote an investigative report into "stop-and-frisk" search policies of New York City Police Department. The series, which aired on NPR in 2011, earned her a silver baton in the 2012 Alfred I. duPont–Columbia University Awards.

Chang returned to NPR in 2012. She was a correspondent for Planet Money and also reported on U.S. Congress activities, specifically immigration, healthcare and gun control. In 2018, she assumed co-host chair on the afternoon radio program All Things Considered. Chang has also appeared as a guest on PBS NewsHour and other television programs for her legal reporting.

== Awards ==
- 2001: Irvine Hellman, Jr. Special Award
- 2011: Art Athens Award for General Excellence in Individual Reporting for radio
- 2012: Alfred I. duPont–Columbia University Awards, Silver Baton
- 2015: National Journalism Award from the Asian American Journalists Association for coverage of Capitol Hill

== Personal life ==
Chang lives in Los Angeles, California, with her dog Mickey, a Shih Tzu, whom she describes as "my absolute best friend in the whole wide world".
