= All Things Considered =

American news program on NPR

- Genre: News: analysis, commentary, features, interviews, specials
- Running time: 135 minutes weekdays; 50 minutes weekends approx.
- Country of origin: United States
- Home station: NPR
- Hosted by: Ailsa Chang; Juana Summers; Scott Detrow
- Original release: May 3, 1971 – present
- Website: npr.org/all-things-considered
- Podcast: Podcast

All Things Considered (ATC) is the flagship news program produced by National Public Radio (NPR). It was the first news program on NPR, premiering on May 3, 1971. It is broadcast live on NPR affiliated stations in the United States, and worldwide through several different outlets. All Things Considered and Morning Edition were the highest rated public radio programs in the United States in 2002 and 2005. The show combines news, analysis, commentary, interviews, and special features, and its segments vary in length and style. ATC airs weekdays from 4:00 p.m. to 6:00 p.m. Eastern Time (live) or Pacific Time (recorded with some updates; in Hawaii it airs as a fully recorded program) or from 3:00 p.m. to 5:00 p.m. Central Time. ATC's weekend counterpart airs on Saturdays and Sundays.

== Background ==
ATC programming combines news, analysis, commentary, interviews, and special features broadcast live daily from 4:00 p.m. to 6:00 p.m. Eastern Time (3 to 5 p.m. Central Time) (20:00 to 22:00 UTC), and is re-fed with updates until 10 p.m. ET (9 p.m. CT) or 7 p.m. PT (02:00 UTC). Broadcasts run about 105 minutes with local content interspersed in between to complete two hours. In 2005, ATC aired on over 560 radio stations and reached an audience of approximately 12 million listeners each weekday, making it the third most listened to radio program in the United States after The Rush Limbaugh Show and Morning Edition. In September 2010, All Things Considered had an average quarter-hour audience of 1.8 million. ATC is co-hosted by rotating cast of regular anchors; current hosts include Ailsa Chang, Juana Summers and Scott Detrow.

The first broadcast of ATC was fed to about 90 radio stations on May 3, 1971, with host Robert Conley. During the first week, these stations were not allowed to broadcast the feed "live" but could record it for later broadcast. The first story was about the march on Washington, D.C., and the growing anti–Vietnam War protests taking place there. NPR chose to place its inaugural daily newscast at the afternoon commute timeslot instead of the morning because many of its affiliates at that time did not sign on for the day until mid-morning or afterward. It was not until 1979, by which time most affiliates had expanded their broadcast days to begin at 6 a.m. or earlier, that NPR premiered Morning Edition.

Weekend All Things Considered (WATC) is a one-hour version of the show that premiered in 1974 and is broadcast on Saturdays and Sundays at 5 p.m. ET.

ATC was excluded from the NPR deal with Sirius Satellite Radio so as not to compete with local stations airing the show.

To coordinate the choice of interview partners in cultural coverage between ATC and other NPR shows (as of 2010: Morning Edition, the weekend editions, Talk of the Nation, and Tell Me More), NPR set up a "dibs list" system around 2005, whereby the first show to declare interest in a particular guest can "reserve" that person.

On March 23, 2020, ATC launched The National Conversation, a live call-in show addressing listener questions about the COVID-19 pandemic in the United States. The program aired from 9 p.m. to 10 p.m. ET on weeknights from the end of March through May 2020.

Similar to Up First, the podcast complement to the network's Morning Edition and Weekend Edition, NPR launched Consider This as a podcast companion to ATC on June 29, 2020, with ATC hosts providing in-depth analysis of a single story each weekday afternoon. National podcast episodes are supplemented in select areas by additional local reporting and analysis from journalists at various NPR member stations, such as Dallas-based KERA. Consider This is also the successor to NPR's weekday afternoon Coronavirus Daily podcast, which had published throughout the spring of 2020. It expanded to weekends on January 8, 2022, with episodes hosted by then-WATC host Michel Martin on Saturdays. The podcast's weekend episode moved to Sundays in May 2023.

== Format ==
The format is less rigid than that of Morning Edition, with a wider array of type and length of stories. The length of stories tends to be greater than Morning Edition, with some stories lasting for almost 23 minutes. Certain types of personal interest stories are almost always covered within this limit; those relating to hard news or entertainment tend to last the standard three-and-a-half to four minutes.

The program begins with a theme song by Don Voegeli playing underneath a one-minute billboard of the stories to be covered during the hour. Then the standard five-minute NPR newscast is delivered from one minute to six minutes past the hour. The newscast offers a cutaway after three minutes (at four minutes past the hour), allowing stations to cover the last 2.5 minutes with evening rush-hour news and traffic reports. For those stations that run the newscast untouched, a 30-second music bed follows instead.

The first, or "A" segment, begins at :06:30 after the hour. It features important news stories, although not necessarily the most important news stories of the day. Often it is here that the most significant interviews or developing stories are placed. Segment A runs 11:29 in duration, and closes out at :18 after with a two-minute station break.

At :20:35 past the hour, ATC picks back up with Segment B. This segment, which runs 8:24, features more news and analysis, and often contains lighter stories and commentary. Segment B breaks for the half-hour at :29 past. The program goes into a one-minute local break.

At the bottom of the hour, ATC resumes with a "host return". In the 30-second return, the host or hosts discuss what's coming up in the remaining half-hour and intro the news. This is immediately followed by a 3:30 newscast which ends at :34 after the hour, followed by a one-minute local break.

Segment C kicks off at :35:35 past the hour, and runs 8:24. Long feature stories are heard here, or as many as three shorter stories or commentaries may be heard as well. Segment D occurs immediately after Segment C at :44 past the hour, and runs for four minutes. Segment D is a designated cutaway for stations to run local commentary or features in lieu of the national segment. Segment D ends at :48 after the hour, and another two-minute break ensues. Occasionally, the show will "break format" and place a long, 12-minute story in Segments C and D without a local cutaway.

Segment E starts at :50 after, and concludes the hour. The segment runs 8:09. Unlike Morning Edition, there is no set format for this segment, although usually the second hour will contain an arts, culture, or lighter news story in this segment. Other times, hard news otherwise not fitting in the program may be placed here.

Stations receive a preliminary rundown before each broadcast (usually a few minutes before 4:00 p.m. Eastern) denoting the timing and placement of stories so they can schedule local content as appropriate. This rundown is updated as stories change until the feed ends at 10 p.m. ET. As with Morning Edition, two hours of content are scheduled for each program. After 6 p.m. Eastern, the feed repeats the earlier hours for the Midwest and West Coast, although information is updated through the evening as appropriate.

== Awards ==
Major awards won by the show include the Ohio State Award, the Peabody Award, the Overseas Press Club Award, the DuPont Award, the American Women in Radio and Television Award, and the Robert F. Kennedy Award. In 1993, the show was inducted into the National Radio Hall of Fame, the first public radio program to be given that honor.

In 2017, the first broadcast episode (from 1971) of All Things Considered was selected for preservation in the National Recording Registry by the Library of Congress. Recordings in the collection are considered "culturally, historically, or aesthetically significant".

== International broadcasts ==
ABC NewsRadio in Australia broadcasts a continuous hour of selected segments from each day's program between 12:00 and 13:00 Australian Eastern Standard Time Monday to Friday. Segments A to D are edited together omitting local NPR news inserts.

NPR Berlin in Germany aired in the local German timeslot, live from the United States.

== Hosts ==
=== Weekday hosts ===
- Robert Conley (1971)
- Mike Waters (1971–1974)
- Jim Russell (1972)
- Susan Stamberg (1972–1986)
- Bob Edwards (1974–1979)
- Sandy Ungar (1980–1982)
- Noah Adams (1982–1987, 1989–2002)
- Renée Montagne (1987–1989)
- Robert Siegel (1987–2018)
- Linda Wertheimer (1989–2002)
- Michele Norris (2002–2011)
- Melissa Block (2003–2015)
- Kelly McEvers (2015–2018)
- Audie Cornish (2012–2022)
- Ari Shapiro (2015–2025)
- Mary Louise Kelly (2018–2026)
- Ailsa Chang (2018–present)
- Juana Summers (2022–present)
- Scott Detrow (2025-present)

=== Weekend hosts ===
- Mike Waters (1974–1978)
- Joe Frank (1978–1979)
- Noah Adams (1978–1982)
- Liane Hansen (1979–1981)
- David Molpus (1982–1984)
- Lee Thornton (1982–1984)
- Steve Curwood (1983–1984)
- Alex Chadwick
- Lynn Neary (1984–1992)
- Emil Guillermo (1989–1991)
- Daniel Zwerdling (1993–1999)
- Lisa Simeone (2000–2002)
- Steve Inskeep (2002–2004)
- Deborah Elliott (2005–2007)
- Andrea Seabrook (2007–2009)
- Guy Raz (2009–2012)
- Arun Rath (2013–2015)
- Michel Martin (2015–2023)
- Scott Detrow (2023–2025)

== Commentators ==
- Joe Bevilacqua (won 2006 New York Festivals award for All Things Considered: a tribute to Joe Barbera)
- David Budbill
- Alan Cheuse (–2015)
- Andrei Codrescu
- Vertamae Grosvenor
- Kevin Kling
- John McIlwraith (1990–2001)
- Bob Mondello
- Daniel Pinkwater
- Reynolds Price
- Ralph Schoenstein
- Daniel Schorr (1985–2010)
- Bailey White

== Featured series ==
From time to time, NPR produces and distributes short series of radio pieces. Series that have aired during the show include:

- All Tech Considered
- The Changing Face of America
- In Character
- Lost & Found Sound
- The NPR 100
- Prison Diaries
- Teenage Diaries
- This I Believe
- Three Books
- Three Minute Fiction
- The Yiddish Radio Project
- You Must Read This
- My Unsung Hero
- Main Character of the Day
- Weekly Dose of Wonder
