= NPR =

American nonprofit media organization

National Public Radio
- Type: Public radio network
- Country: United States
- First air date: April 20, 1971; 55 years ago
- Availability: Global
- Founded: February 26, 1970; 56 years ago
- Endowment: ▲$382.3 million (2025)
- Revenue: ▲$363.1 million (2025)
- Net income: ▲$20.5 million (2025)
- Headquarters: 1111 North Capitol Street NE, Washington, D.C.; Culver City, California
- Broadcast area: United States; Guam; Puerto Rico; American Forces Network
- Owner: NPR's member public radio stations
- Key people: Katherine Maher (CEO)
- Former names: Association of Public Radio Stations; National Educational Radio Network
- Affiliation: WRN Broadcast
- Official website: npr.org

National Public Radio (NPR) is an American public broadcasting organization headquartered in Washington, D.C., with its NPR West headquarters in Culver City, California. It serves as a national syndicator to a network of more than 1,000 public radio stations in the United States.

Funding for NPR comes from dues and fees paid by member stations, underwriting from corporate sponsors, and (until 2025) annual grants from the publicly funded Corporation for Public Broadcasting. Most of its member stations are owned by non-profit organizations, including public school districts, colleges, and universities. NPR operates independently of any government or corporation, and has full control of its content.

NPR produces and distributes both news and cultural programming. The organization's flagship shows are two drive-time news broadcasts: Morning Edition and the afternoon All Things Considered, both carried by most NPR member stations, and among the most popular radio programs in The USA. As of March 2018, the drive-time programs attract an audience of 14.9 million and 14.7 million per week, respectively.

NPR manages the Public Radio Satellite System, which distributes its programs and other programming from independent producers and networks such as American Public Media and Public Radio Exchange, and which also acts as a primary entry point for the Emergency Alert System. Its content is also available on-demand online, on mobile networks, and in many cases, as podcasts.

== Name ==
The organization's legal name is National Public Radio and its trademarked brand is NPR; it is known by both names. In June 2010, the organization announced that it was "making a conscious effort to consistently refer to ourselves as NPR on-air and online" because NPR is the common name for the organization and its radio hosts have used the tag line "This... is NPR" for many years. National Public Radio remains the legal name of the group, however, as it has been since 1970.

== History ==
=== 1970s ===
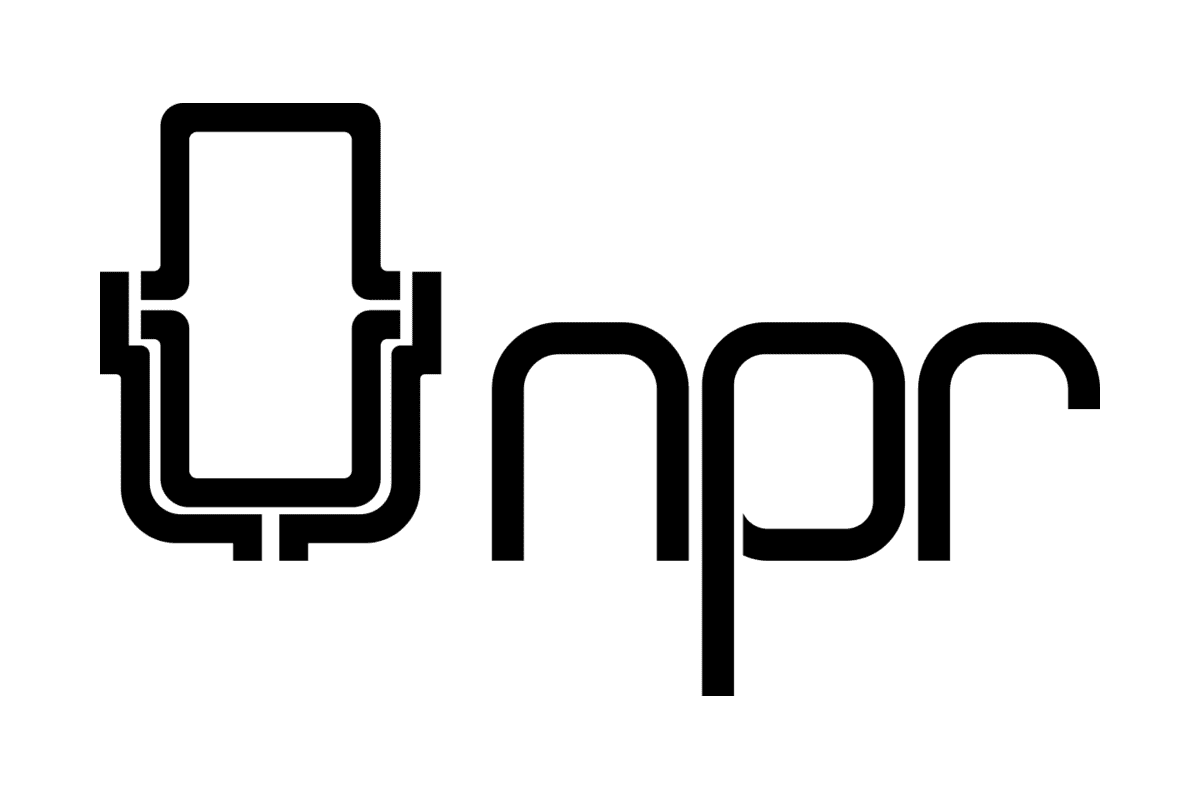
1970s logo

NPR replaced the National Educational Radio Network on February 26, 1970, following Congressional passage of the Public Broadcasting Act of 1967. This act was signed into law by President Lyndon B. Johnson, and established the Corporation for Public Broadcasting, which also created the Public Broadcasting Service (PBS) for television in addition to NPR.

The board then hired Donald Quayle to be the first president of NPR with 30 employees and 90 charter member local stations, and studios in Washington, D.C.

NPR aired its first broadcast on April 20, 1971, covering United States Senate hearings on the ongoing Vietnam War in Southeast Asia. The afternoon drive-time newscast All Things Considered premiered on May 3, 1971, first hosted by Robert Conley. NPR was primarily a production and distribution organization until 1977, when it merged with the Association of Public Radio Stations. Morning Edition premiered on November 5, 1979, first hosted by Bob Edwards.

=== 1980s ===
NPR suffered an almost fatal setback in 1983 when efforts to expand services created a deficit of nearly $7 million (equivalent to $19 million in 2022 dollars). After a Congressional investigation and the resignation of NPR's then-president Frank Mankiewicz, the Corporation for Public Broadcasting agreed to lend the network money to stave off bankruptcy. In exchange, NPR agreed to a new arrangement whereby the annual CPB stipend that it had previously received directly would be divided among local stations instead; in turn, those stations would support NPR productions on a subscription basis. NPR also agreed to turn its satellite service into a cooperative venture (the Public Radio Satellite System), making it possible for non-NPR shows to get national distribution. It took NPR approximately three years to pay off the debt.

1990s logo

=== 1990s ===
Delano Lewis, the president of C&P Telephone, left that position to become NPR's CEO and president in January 1994. Lewis resigned in August 1998. In November 1998, NPR's board of directors hired Kevin Klose, the director of the International Broadcasting Bureau, as its president and chief executive officer.

=== 2000s ===
September 11th attacks made it apparent in a very urgent way that we need another facility that could keep NPR going if something devastating happens in Washington.

— Jay Kernis, NPR's senior VP for programming

NPR spent nearly $13 million to acquire and equip a West Coast 25,000-square-foot (2,300 m^{2}) production facility, NPR West, which opened in Culver City, Los Angeles County, California, in November 2002. With room for up to 90 employees, it was established to expand its production capabilities, improve its coverage of the western United States, and create a backup production facility capable of keeping NPR on the air in the event of a catastrophe in Washington, D.C.

In November 2003, NPR received over $200 million from the estate of the late Joan B. Kroc, the widow of Ray Kroc, founder of McDonald's. This was the largest monetary gift ever to a cultural institution.

In 2004, the Kroc gift increased NPR's budget by over 50% to $153 million. Of the money, $34 million was deposited in its endowment. The endowment fund before the gift totaled $35 million. NPR will use the interest from the bequest to expand its news staff and reduce some member stations' fees.

In August 2005, NPR entered podcasting with a directory of over 170 programs created by NPR and member stations. Users downloaded NPR and other public radio podcasts 5 million times by November of that year. Ten years later, by March 2015, users downloaded podcasts produced only by NPR 94 million times, and NPR podcasts like Fresh Air and the TED Radio Hour routinely made the iTunes Top Podcasts list.

Ken Stern became chief executive in September 2006, reportedly as the "hand-picked successor" of CEO Kevin Klose, who gave up the job but remained as NPR's president; Stern had worked with Klose at Radio Free Europe.

On December 10, 2008, NPR announced that it would reduce its workforce by 7% and cancel the news programs Day to Day and News & Notes. The organization indicated this was in response to a rapid drop in corporate underwriting during the 2008 financial crisis.

In the fall of 2008, NPR programming reached a record 27.5 million people weekly, according to Arbitron ratings figures. NPR stations reach 32.7 million listeners overall.

In March 2008, the NPR Board announced that Stern would be stepping down from his role as chief executive officer, following conflict with NPR's board of directors "over the direction of the organization", including issues NPR's member station managers had had with NPR's expansion into new media "at the expense of serving" the stations that financially support NPR.

As of 2009, corporate sponsorship comprised 26% of the NPR budget.

=== 2010s ===
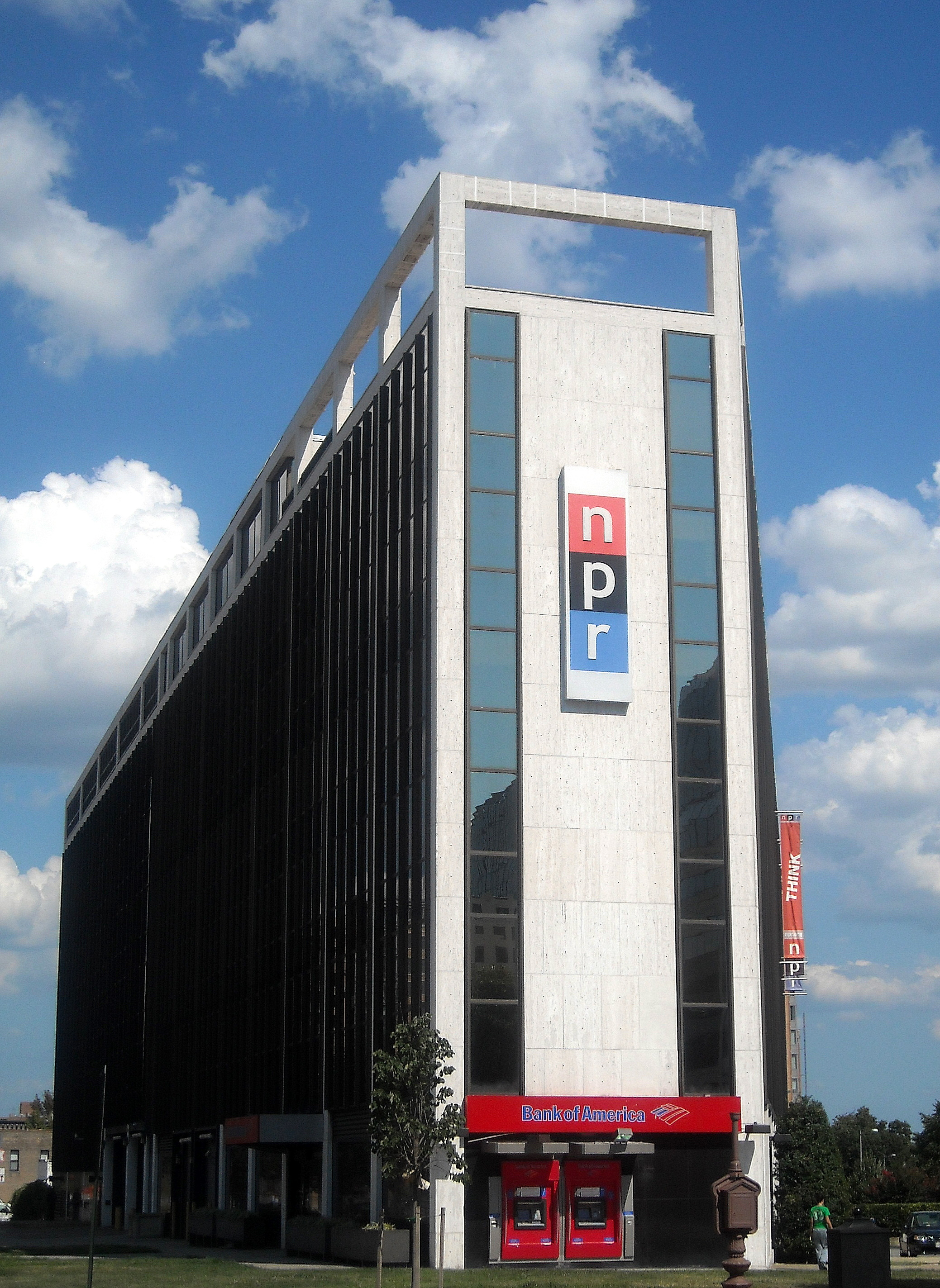
NPR's former headquarters at 635 Massachusetts Avenue NW in Washington, D.C. (demolished in 2013)

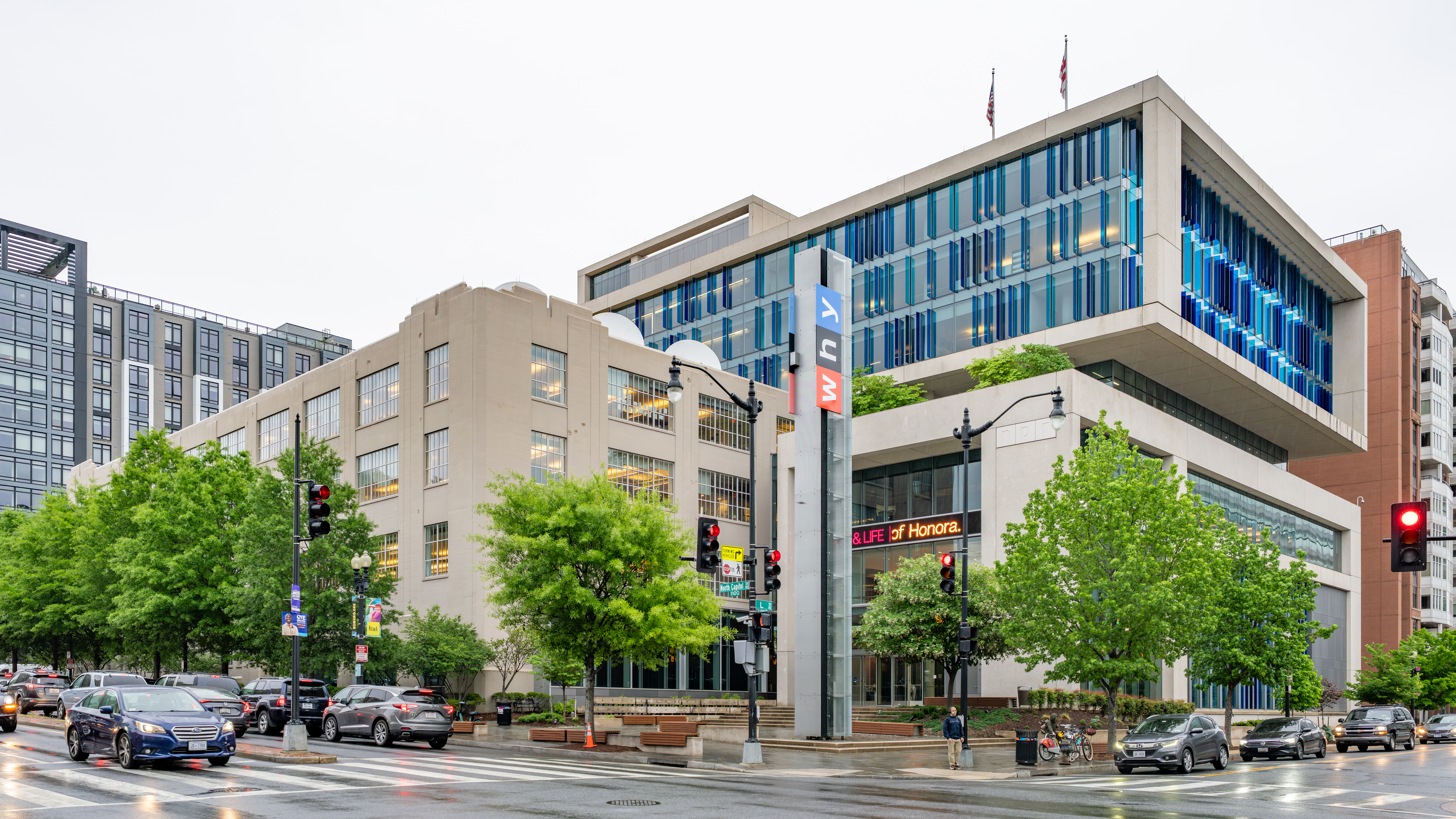
The new NPR headquarters at 1111 North Capitol Street, NE.

In October 2010, NPR accepted a $1.8 million grant from the Open Society Institute. The grant is meant to begin a project called Impact of Government that was intended to add at least 100 journalists at NPR member radio stations in all 50 states by 2013. The OSI has made previous donations but does not take on-air credit for its gifts.

In April 2013, NPR moved from its home of 19 years (635 Massachusetts Avenue NW) to new offices and production facilities at 1111 North Capitol Street NE in a building adapted from the former C&P Telephone Warehouse and Repair Facility. The new headquarters—at the corner of North Capitol Street NE and L Street NW—is in the burgeoning NoMa neighborhood of Washington. The first show scheduled to be broadcast from the new studios was Weekend Edition Saturday. Morning Edition was the last show to move to the new location. In June 2013 NPR canceled the weekday call-in show Talk of the Nation.

In September 2013, some of NPR's 840 full- and part-time employees were offered a voluntary buyout plan to reduce staff by 10 percent and return NPR to a balanced budget by the 2015 fiscal year.

In December 2018, The Washington Post reported that between 20 and 22 percent of NPR staff were classified as temps, which compares to about five percent of a typical for-profit television station. Some of the temporary staff members told the newspaper that the systems were "exploitative", but NPR's president of operations said the system was in place because the station is a "media company that strives to be innovative and nimble."

In December 2018, NPR launched a new podcast analytics technology called Remote Audio Data (RAD), which developer Stacey Goers described as a "method for sharing listening metrics from podcast applications straight back to publishers, with extreme care and respect for user privacy."

=== 2020s ===
In late November 2022, chief executive officer John Lansing told staffers in a memo that NPR needed to reduce spending by $10 million during that fiscal year due to a drop in revenue from sponsors. The amount was approximately three percent of the organization's annual budget.

In February 2023, Lansing announced in a memo that the network would be laying off approximately 10 percent of the workforce due to reduced advertising revenue. He said the annual operating budget was approximately $300 million, and the gap would likely be between $30 and $32 million.

In January 2024, NPR's board named former Wikimedia Foundation CEO Katherine Maher as its new CEO, effective late March.

On January 31, 2025, a Defense Department memo announced that NPR was among the major news outlets required to move out of its longtime workspace on the Correspondents' Corridor in the Pentagon, under a new Annual Media Rotation Program for the Pentagon Press Corps.

Following enactment of the rescission law in July 2025, CPB announced an orderly wind-down of operations and furloughs as funding was withdrawn, while public broadcasters and allies signaled legal and legislative pushback.

In October 2025, NPR, among other major news organizations across the political spectrum, including Associated Press, Bloomberg News, The Washington Post, The New York Times, CNN, and Fox News rejected new Defense Department media-access rules they said restricted independent reporting; the Pentagon Press Association signaled potential legal action.

== Governance ==
NPR is a membership organization. Member stations are required to be non-commercial or non-commercial educational radio stations; have at least five full-time professional employees; operate for at least 18 hours per day; and not be designed solely to further a religious broadcasting philosophy or be used for classroom distance learning programming. Each member station receives one vote at the annual NPR board meetings—exercised by its designated Authorized Station Representative ("A-Rep").

To oversee the day-to-day operations and prepare its budget, members elect a board of directors. The board was previously composed of ten A-Reps, five members of the general public, and the chair of the NPR Foundation. On November 2, 2015, NPR Members approved a change in the NPR Bylaws to expand the board of directors to 23 directors, consisting of 12 Member Directors who are managers of NPR Member stations and are elected to the board by their fellow Member stations, 9 Public Directors who are prominent members of the public selected by the board and confirmed by NPR Member stations, the NPR Foundation Chair, and the NPR President & CEO. Terms are for three years and are staggered such that some stand for election every year.

As of January 2024, the board of directors of NPR included the following members:

NPR member station managers

- Jennifer Ferro, president, KCRW and chair of the NPR board of directors
- Stephen George, general manager, Louisville Public Media
- Myrna Johnson, executive director, Iowa Public Radio
- Margaret Low, CEO, WBUR
- R.C. McBride, general manager, WGLT and WCBU
- Maria O'Mara, executive director, KUER-FM
- Tina Pamintuan, CEO, St. Louis Public Radio
- Elise Pepple, executive director, Marfa Public Radio
- Erika Pulley-Hayes, general manager, WAMU
- Mike Savage, director and general manager, WEKU

President of NPR

- Katherine Maher, president and CEO

Chair of the NPR Foundation

- John McGinn

Public members of the board

- Milena Alberti-Perez Financial, Media and Technology Executive
- Matthew Barzun, Media Entrepreneur, author
- Scott Donaton, Founder, Narrative Thread and former SVP of Marketing at Hulu
- LeRoy Kim managing director, Allen & Company LLC
- Joanna Lambert, Head of Consumer, Yahoo!
- Catherine Levene, Executive, entrepreneur, and vice-chair, NPR board of directors
- Judith Segura, Lead Thermal Architect, Apple
- Howard Wollner, Senior Vice President, Retired, Starbucks
- Neal Zuckerman, managing director and Senior Partner, Head of the Media Practice, BCG

The original purposes of NPR, as ratified by the board of directors, are the following:

- Provide an identifiable daily product which is consistent and reflects the highest standards of broadcast journalism.
- Provide extended coverage of public events, issues and ideas, and to acquire and produce special public affairs programs.
- Acquire and produce cultural programs which can be scheduled individually by stations.
- Provide access to the intellectual and cultural resources of cities, universities and rural districts through a system of cooperative program development with member public radio stations.
- Develop and distribute programs for specific groups (adult education, instruction, modular units for local productions) which may meet needs of individual regions or groups, but may not have general national relevance.
- Establish liaison with foreign broadcasters for a program exchange service.
- Produce materials specifically intended to develop the art and technical potential of radio

NPR Public Editor

The Public Editor responds to significant listener queries, comments and criticisms. The position reports to the president and CEO John Lansing.

== List of presidents/CEOs ==
- Donald Quayle (1970–1973)
- Lee Frischknecht (1973–1977)
- Frank Mankiewicz (1977–1983)
- Douglas J. Bennet (1983–1993)
- Delano Lewis (1993–1998)
- Kevin Klose (1998–2008)
- Vivian Schiller (2009–2011)
- Gary Knell (2011–2013)
- Paul Haaga (2013–2014)
- Jarl Mohn (2014–2019)
- John F. Lansing (2019–2024)
- Katherine Maher (Since 2024)

== Funding ==
In 2020, NPR released a budget for FY21 anticipating revenue of $250 million, a slight decrease from the prior year due to impacts of COVID-19. The budget anticipated $240 million in operating expenses, plus additional debt service and capital costs that led to a cash deficit of approximately $4 million. The budget included $25 million in budget cuts.

=== Funding pre-2000 ===
During the 1970s and early 1980s, the majority of NPR funding came from the federal government. Steps were taken during the Reagan administration in the 1980s to completely wean NPR from government support, but the 1983 funding crisis forced the network to make immediate changes.

=== Funding since the 2000s ===
According to Corporation for Public Broadcasting (CPB), in 2009 11.3% of the aggregate revenues of all public radio broadcasting stations were funded from federal sources, principally through CPB; in 2012, 10.9% of the revenues for Public Radio came from federal sources.

In 2010, NPR revenues totaled $180 million, with the bulk of revenues coming from programming fees, grants from foundations or business entities, contributions and sponsorships. According to the 2009 financial statement, about 50% of NPR revenues come from the fees it charges member stations for programming and distribution charges. Typically, NPR member stations receive funds through on-air pledge drives, corporate underwriting, state and local governments, educational institutions, and the federally funded CPB. In 2009, member stations derived 6% of their revenue from federal, state and local government funding, 10% of their revenue from CPB grants, and 14% of their revenue from universities. NPR receives a small number of competitive grants from CPB and federal agencies like the Department of Education and the Department of Commerce. This funding amounts to less than 1% of revenues.

In 2011, NPR announced the roll-out of their own online advertising network, which allows member stations to run geographically targeted advertisement spots from national sponsors that may otherwise be unavailable to their local area, opening additional advertising-related revenue streams to the broadcaster.

Center Stage, a mix of native advertising and banner ad featured prominently on the NPR homepage, above-the-fold, was launched in 2013. The launch partner for Center Stage was Squarespace.

In 2014, NPR CEO Jarl Mohn said the network would begin to increase revenue by having brands NPR views as more relevant to the audience underwrite NPR programs and requesting higher rates from them.

For the year ended September 30, 2018, total operating revenues were $235 million, increasing to almost $259 million by September 2019.

In 2023, Current reported that NPR partnered with Spotify to run targeted advertisements sold through the Spotify Audience Network platform within NPR programming, when NPR has empty slots available they otherwise were unable to sell to other advertisers directly.

==== Funding under the Second Trump administration ====
===== FCC underwriting investigation =====
In January 2025, Federal Communications Commission (FCC) Chair Brendan Carr ordered an investigation of the corporate underwriting sponsorships of PBS and NPR member stations for possible violations of FCC regulations prohibiting noncommercial broadcasters from airing advertisements. The following March, the Senate Permanent Subcommittee on Investigations opened an inquiry into the investigation ordered by Carr. In 1981, Congress amended the Communications Act of 1934 to authorize noncommercial station licensees to offer services and facilities in exchange for remuneration on the condition that it not interfere with their provision of public telecommunications services. (Note: However, while public television stations may apply under the FCC's must-carry rules for carriage by multichannel video programming distributors (such as cable and satellite television operators), the Communications Act bars public television stations from receiving retransmission consent fees from MVPDs that commercial television stations may receive under the 1992 Cable Act.) (Note: Also, while streaming television services often include local broadcast television channels, reports issued by the Congressional Research Service in 2016 and 2020 noted that the FCC had not expanded its definition of multichannel video programming distributors to include online video distributors, and that the regulatory framework for broadcast, cable, and satellite television does not generally apply to streaming services (including must-carry requirements).) In 1984, the FCC adopted a policy under the amendment allowing noncommercial stations to broadcast underwriting spots from for-profit entities that provided donations or underwriting.

While the FCC prohibited underwriting spots from including certain specific content (e.g. promotion of the contributor's products, services, or business, comparative or qualitative descriptions of products, price information, calls to action, or inducements to buy, sell, or lease products), the FCC has generally given noncommercial broadcasters deference in determining compliance with its underwriting rules, placed no specific limit on the length of the underwriting spots, and permitted the use of logos and slogans for the purpose of identifying the contributor, business location information and phone numbers, value-neutral descriptions of product or service lines, brand and trade names, and product and service listings. Also, the FCC's underwriting rules and prohibition on noncommercial broadcasters receiving advertising only apply to underwriting spots that are broadcast and do not apply to the websites of noncommercial broadcasters. (Note: However, any advertising revenue received by nonprofit organizations registered as 501(c)(3) organizations is still subject to Unrelated Business Income Tax under the Internal Revenue Code.) The 1981 amendment to the Communications Act also established a temporary commission to identify alternative sources of funding for public broadcasting and study the potential for advertising revenue using limited demonstrations, but in its final report released in 1983, the commission found that the prospect of significant advertising revenue was limited and instead recommended that Congress continue providing the appropriation to Corporation for Public Broadcasting (CPB).

In 2012, the CPB issued a report commissioned by Congress and that included market analysis conducted by Booz & Company which noted that corporate underwriting accounted for less than one-fifth of the revenue for public television and radio stations and had declined substantially due to the Great Recession. Along with the 1983 report and a 2007 Government Accountability Office report about public television specifically, the CPB report concluded that growth in such underwriting revenue was unlikely, that allowing public broadcasters to air advertisements would not offset a decline in federal funding while likely contributing to a decline in support from other sources, and that there was no alternative source of funding to the federal CPB appropriation that could sustain public broadcasting service at the same level. Analysis of CPB data published by the Pew Research Center in August 2023 found that underwriting revenue for NPR member stations from 2008 through 2021 was mostly flat and fell below 2009 levels in 2021 following the COVID-19 recession, while corporate funding for the PBS News Hour ranged from 17% to 23% of total revenue from 2015 through 2022.

===== Executive Order 14290 =====
Executive Order 14290, titled "Ending Taxpayer Subsidization of Biased Media", is an executive order signed by U.S. president Donald Trump on May 1, 2025 to end federal funding for NPR (a radio network) and PBS (a television network) by the Corporation for Public Broadcasting (CPB) and by federal agencies, alleging biased news coverage in violation of the Public Broadcasting Act of 1967 (PBA) and that public funding for news programming was "not only outdated and unnecessary but corrosive to the appearance of journalistic independence" in the current U.S. media market.

CPB, PBS, and NPR executives issued press releases arguing that the executive order was unlawful under the PBA and that the organizations would explore how to continue providing programming while challenging the order. On May 27, NPR and three public radio stations sued the Trump administration for ending their federal funding under the executive order, citing it as a violation of the First Amendment. On May 30, PBS sued the Trump administration for ending their federal funding under the executive order.

Before the executive order was issued, the CPB filed a lawsuit against the Trump administration on April 28 after Trump attempted to fire three of the five members of the CPB's board of directors, while the CPB also filed a lawsuit against the Federal Emergency Management Agency (FEMA) in March 2025 for halting their funding under the Next Generation Warning System Grant Program within the Integrated Public Alert and Warning System.

FEMA released the funds on April 24. On June 8, District of Columbia U.S. District Court Judge Randolph Moss ruled against a preliminary injunction requested by the CPB in its lawsuit against the attempted director removals since the CPB changed its by-laws afterward under the District of Columbia Nonprofit Corporation Act to prevent any authority, including the President of the United States, from removing a director without a two-thirds vote of the other directors, which allowed for the directors to keep their positions. On July 15, the Trump administration filed a separate lawsuit to remove the same CPB directors.

On March 31, 2026, Judge Moss ruled for the plaintiffs, blocking the order on First Amendment grounds. In his ruling, Moss wrote, "It is difficult to conceive of clearer evidence that a government action is targeted at viewpoints that the president does not like and seeks to squelch."

===== Rescissions Act of 2025 =====
The Rescissions Act of 2025 altered the financial outlook for the Corporation for Public Broadcasting (CPB) by reclaiming unspent allocations and reducing advance funding. While NPR received limited direct support from the CPB, the legislation sparked concern for local member stations. Rural broadcasters were particularly vulnerable because they depended on CPB grants for a larger share of their operating budgets than urban stations.

=== Underwriting spots versus commercials ===
In contrast with commercial broadcasting, NPR's radio broadcasts do not carry traditional commercials, but has advertising in the form of brief statements from major sponsors which may include corporate slogans, descriptions of products and services, and contact information such as website addresses and telephone numbers. These statements are called underwriting spots and, unlike commercials, are governed by specific FCC restrictions in addition to truth in advertising laws; they cannot advocate a product or "promote the goods and services" of for-profit entities. These restrictions apply only to radio broadcasts and not NPR's other digital platforms. When questioned on the subject of how corporate underwriting revenues and foundation grants were holding up during the recession, in a speech broadcast on C-SPAN before the National Press Club on March 2, 2009, then president and CEO Vivian Schiller stated: "underwriting is down, it's down for everybody; this is the area that is most down for us, in sponsorship, underwriting, advertising, call it whatever you want; just like it is for all of media." Hosts of the NPR program Planet Money stated the audience is indeed a product being sold to advertisers in the same way as commercial stations, saying: "they are not advertisers exactly but, they have a lot of the same characteristics; let's just say that."

== Audience ==
According to NPR's 2022 data, 30.7 million listeners tuned into its programs each week. This is down from its 2017 high of 37.7 million, but still well above its total of 20.9 million in 2008. A Pew Research Center poll in 2025 found that approximately 20% of Americans regularly get their news from NPR.

=== Demographics ===
According to 2015 figures, 87% of the NPR terrestrial public radio audience and 67% of the NPR podcast audience is white. According to the 2012 Pew Research Center 2012 News Consumption Survey, NPR listeners tend to be highly educated, with 54% of regular listeners being college graduates and 21% having some college. NPR's audience is almost exactly average in terms of the sex of listeners (49% male, 51% female).

A 2012 Pew Research Center survey found that the NPR audience leans Democratic (17% Republican, 37% independent, 43% Democratic) and politically moderate (21% conservative, 39% moderate, 36% liberal). A late 2019 survey, also by Pew, found that NPR's audience overwhelmingly leaned Democratic. Further, 87% of those surveyed identified as Democrats, or leaning Democratic, and 12% were Republicans.

=== Trust ===
In 2005, a Harris telephone survey found that NPR was the most trusted news source in the United States. A 2014 Pew poll reported that, of adults who had heard of NPR, 55% of those polled trusted it; this was a similar level of listener trust as CNN, NBC, and ABC. A 2025 survey of likely voters found 53% trusted public media in the United States compared to 35% for the media in general.

=== Ratings ===
NPR stations generally subscribe to the Nielsen rating service, but are not included in published ratings and rankings such as Radio & Records. NPR station listenership is measured by Nielsen in both Diary and PPM (people meter) markets. NPR stations are frequently not included in "summary level" diary data used by most advertising agencies for media planning. Data on NPR listening can be accessed using "respondent level" diary data. Additionally, all radio stations (public and commercial) are treated equally within the PPM data sets making NPR station listenership data much more widely available to the media planning community. NPR's signature morning news program, Morning Edition, is the network's most popular program, drawing 14.63 million listeners a week, with its afternoon newsmagazine, All Things Considered, a close second, with 14.6 million listeners a week according to 2017 Nielsen ratings data. Arbitron data is also provided by Radio Research Consortium, a non-profit corporation which subscribes to the Arbitron service and distributes the data to NPR and other non-commercial stations and on its website.

== Digital media ==
NPR's history in digital media includes the work of an independent, for-profit company called Public Interactive, which was founded in 1999 and acquired by PRI in June 2004, when it became a non-profit company. By July 2008, Public Interactive had "170 subscribers who collectively operate 325 public radio and television stations" and clients such as Car Talk, The World, and The Tavis Smiley Show; by the end of that month, NPR acquired Public Interactive from PRI In March 2011, NPR revealed a restructuring proposal in which Boston-based Public Interactive would become NPR Digital Services, separate from the Washington D.C.–based NPR Digital Media, which focuses on NPR-branded services. NPR Digital Services would continue offering its services to public TV stations.

The technical backbone of its digital news publishing system is Core Publisher, which was built on Drupal, an open-source content management system.

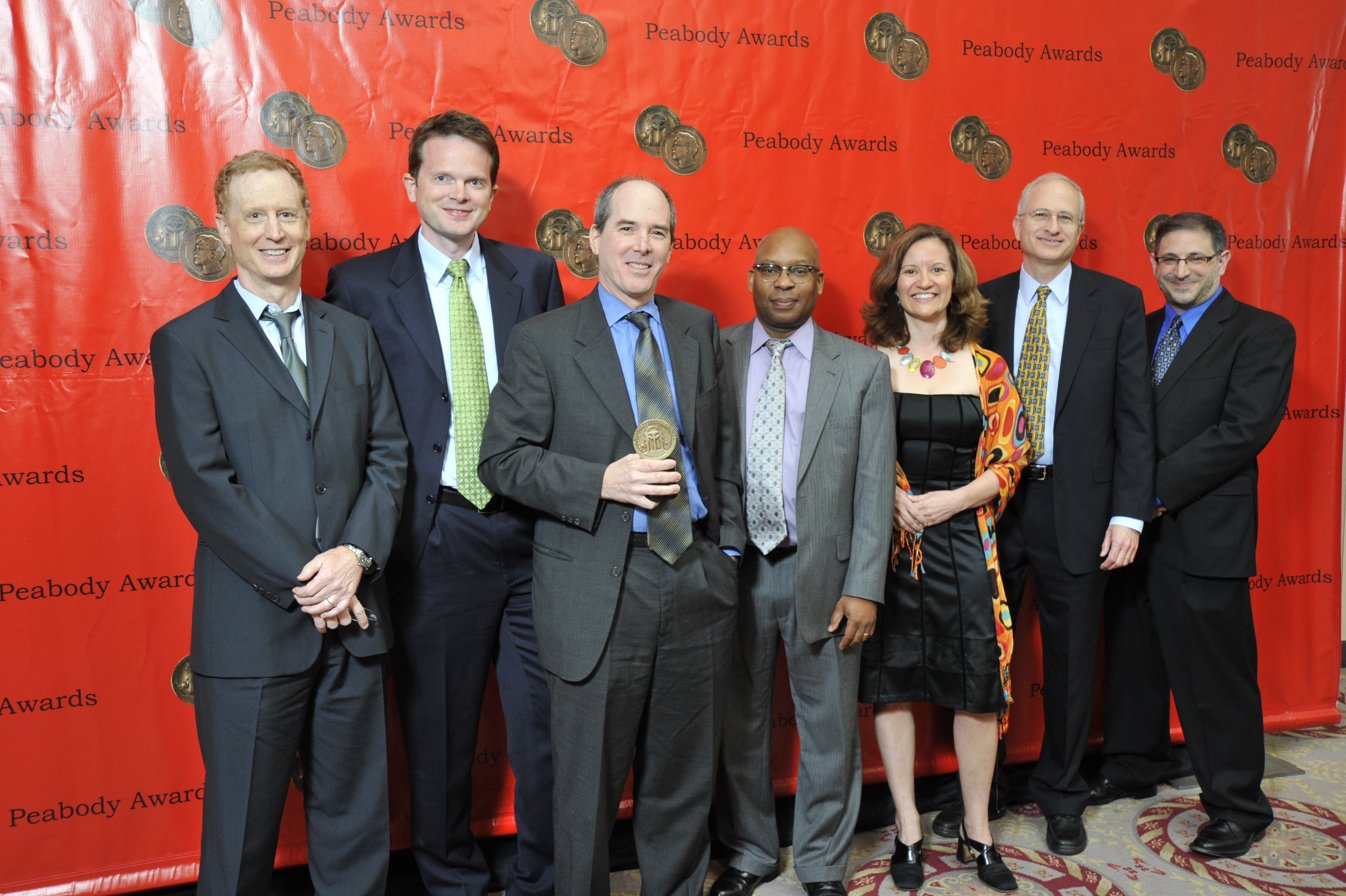
Kinsey Wilson and the npr.org crew at the 69th Annual Peabody Awards

In 2021, NPR had been dubbed as "leveraging the Twitter generation" because of its adaptation of the popular microblogging service as one of its primary vehicles of information. Of NPR's Twitter followers, the majority (67%) also listened to NPR on the radio. In a 2010 survey of more than 10,000 respondents, NPR found that its Twitter followers were younger, more connected to the social web, and more likely to access content through digital platforms such as its Peabody Award-winning website npr.org, as well as podcasts, mobile apps and more. As of 2014, NPR had more than one Twitter account including @NPR; its survey found that most respondents followed between two and five NPR accounts, including topical account, show-specific accounts and on-air staff accounts.

In addition, NPR's Facebook page became a part of the company's foray into social media. Started by college student and fan Geoff Campbell in 2008, the page was quickly taken over by NPR, and grew to over to nearly 4 million fans by 2010. Facebook is a popular example of the company's then new focus on a younger audience.

In May 2018, a group led by NPR acquired the podcasting app Pocket Casts. On July 16, 2021, Automattic acquired Pocket Casts from NPR.

=== Mobile Apps ===
The NPR News app was launched in 2009, first for iOS smartphones, followed later by a version for Android users. Both versions included a sections with NPR's print news, podcasts, their five-minute hourly newscasts, and recordings of stories that were aired previously. The iOS app additionally included live streams of various member stations, and program guides for the stations, features that were not originally included in the Android version. The Android app was released under an open source Apache License, while the code of the iOS version remained proprietary.

NPR One logo

In July 2014, NPR launched NPR One on iOS and Android, which aimed to make it easier for listeners to stream local NPR stations live, and listen to NPR podcasts by autoplaying content and permitting easy navigation. Since launch, NPR has made the service available on additional channels: Windows mobile devices, web browsers, Chromecast, Apple Car Play, Apple Watch, Android Auto, Android Wear, Samsung Gear S2 and S3, Amazon Fire TV, and Amazon Alexa–enabled devices. The New York Times listed NPR One as one of 2016's "best apps".

In April 2018, the NPR app (renamed from the NPR News app), underwent a significant update that changed the design, user experience, selection of content, and added breaking news notifications.

In 2019, NPR planned to merge the NPR One service into the NPR app to reduce confusion. By December 2023, the merge was complete and the NPR One app was made unavailable.

== Programming ==
=== Programs produced by NPR ===
As of October 2024, the NPR programs still in production are as follows:

==== News and public affairs programs (broadcast) ====
NPR News logo

NPR produces daily news programs that air live on member stations.

- Morning Edition, a morning news magazine hosted by Leila Fadel, Steve Inskeep, Michel Martin, and A Martínez.
  - Weekend Edition, hosted by Scott Simon (Saturdays) and Ayesha Rascoe (Sundays).
- All Things Considered, an evening news magazine hosted by Ailsa Chang, Scott Detrow, Mary Louise Kelly, and Juana Summers.
  - Weekend All Things Considered
- Here and Now, a midday news magazine hosted by Deepa Fernandes, Scott Tong, and Robin Young (co-produced with WBUR).
- NPR produces 5-minute hourly newscasts around the clock, airing at the top of every hour (and the bottom of the hour on weekday mornings and evenings).

==== News and public affairs programs (podcasts) ====
- Up First, a morning news podcast hosted by Morning Edition and Weekend Edition hosts.
- Consider This, an afternoon news podcast hosted by All Things Considered and Weekend All Things Considered hosts.
- NPR News Now, the podcast feed for hourly newscasts.
- The NPR Politics Podcast, hosted by Tamara Keith and Asma Khalid.
- State of the World (formerly State of Ukraine), a news podcast featuring international stories from NPR journalists on the ground.

==== Storytelling and cultural programming ====
- Alt.Latino, a podcast on Latino arts and culture hosted by Felix Contreras and Anamaria Sayre.
- NPR's Book of the Day, a literary podcast that features interviews with authors of all genres, hosted by Andrew Limbong.
- Code Switch, a podcast about race and identity hosted by Gene Demby, Lori Lizarraga, and B.A. Parker.
- Embedded, an investigative podcast hosted by Kelly McEvers.
- How I Built This, a podcast on entrepreneurship hosted by Guy Raz.
- It's Been a Minute, a podcast on pop culture hosted by Brittany Luse.
- Life Kit, an advice podcast hosted by Marielle Segarra.
- Planet Money, a podcast on economics.
  - The Indicator, a daily podcast on economics from the people who make Planet Money.
- Pop Culture Happy Hour, a podcast on pop culture hosted by Aisha Harris, Linda Holmes, Stephen Thompson, and Glen Weldon.
- Short Wave, a daily science podcast hosted by Emily Kwong and Regina Barber.
- TED Radio Hour, hosted by Manoush Zomorodi (co-produced with TED).
- Throughline, a podcast on history hosted by Rund Abdelfatah and Ramtin Arablouei.
- Wait Wait... Don't Tell Me!, a humorous news-based panel show hosted by Peter Sagal (co-produced with WBEZ).
- Wild Card, an interview podcast hosted by Rachel Martin.
- How to Do Everything, a comedy podcast hosted by Mike Danforth and Ian Chillag.

==== Music programming ====
- All Songs Considered, a music podcast.
- Jazz Night in America, hosted by Christian McBride (co-produced with WBGO and Jazz at Lincoln Center).
- Tiny Desk Concerts, video concert series broadcast on NPR official website and NPR Music YouTube channel.
  - Tiny Desk Radio, a weekly hour-long radio program based on Tiny Desk Concerts hosted by Bobby Carter and Anamaria Sayre.

=== Programs distributed by NPR ===
==== News and public affairs ====
- 1A, public affairs roundtable program hosted by Jenn White (WAMU).
- Fresh Air, interviews with cultural news-makers hosted by Terry Gross and Tonya Mosley (WHYY-FM).
- Youth Radio, stories told by youth (self-produced).

==== Storytelling and cultural programming ====
- Bullseye with Jesse Thorn, hosted by Jesse Thorn (Maximum Fun).
- The Best of Car Talk, humorous automotive advice hosted by Tom Magliozzi and Ray Magliozzi (WBUR; production ended September 2017, currently running as "best of").
- The Engines of Our Ingenuity, a daily radio series that tells the story of human invention and creativity in 3 1/2 minute essays (Houston Public Radio, sponsored by University of Houston).
- Radio Ambulante, a Spanish-Language podcast which covers news in Latin America (self-produced).
- StoryCorps, oral history recordings (self-produced).

==== Music programming ====
- From the Top, a program showcasing young classical musicians between the ages of 8–18 (self-produced).
- Mountain Stage, hosted by Larry Groce (West Virginia Public Broadcasting).
- World Cafe, a 2-hour music program featuring both recorded music and interviews and live in-studio performances, hosted by Raina Douris (WXPN).

=== Public radio programs not affiliated with NPR ===
Many programs broadcast on U.S. public radio stations are not affiliated with NPR. If these programs are distributed by another distributor, a public radio station must also affiliate with that network to take that network's programming.

American Public Media (APM) and Public Radio Exchange (PRX; which also merged with Public Radio International in 2018) are other major public radio production and distribution organizations with distinct missions, and each competes with the other and NPR for programming slots on public radio stations.

Most public radio stations are NPR member stations and many are affiliate stations of APM and PRX at the same time. The organizations have different governance structures and missions and relationships with stations.

==== American Public Media ====
- BBC World Service, world news produced by the BBC often used to fill overnight hours
- Classical 24, generally airs overnights on many non-commercial stations
- The Daily, daily podcast created by The New York Times and hosted by Michael Barbaro among others
- Marketplace, program that focuses on business, the economy, and events that influence them
- Performance Today, most listened-to daily classical music radio program in the United States (formerly distributed by NPR)
- Pipedreams, radio music program focusing on organ music
- The Splendid Table, weekly program about food

==== Public Radio Exchange ====
This list includes programs that were distributed by Public Radio International (PRI) prior to the merger with PRX.

- A Way with Words, a show about language; distributed by Public Radio Exchange and Public Radio Satellite System
- Echoes, a daily program of ambient, new age, and electronic music hosted by John Diliberto (formerly distributed by PRI)
- Hearts of Space, a weekly program of ambient, space, and contemplative music hosted by Stephen Hill, San Rafael, Calif.
- Latino USA, Latino issues hosted by Maria Hinojosa (Futuro Media Group; formerly distributed by NPR)
- Living on Earth, environmental news program (formerly distributed by NPR and PRI)
- Philosophy Talk, everyday topics examined through a philosophical lens, hosted by Stanford philosophy professors John Perry and Ken Taylor, produced by Ben Manilla Productions (KALW)
- Planetary Radio, space exploration radio program hosted by Mat Kaplan, The Planetary Society, Pasadena, Calif.
- Reveal, a podcast of investigative journalism hosted by Al Letson (Center for Investigative Reporting).
- Selected Shorts, dramatic readings hosted by Isaiah Sheffer, Symphony Space, (WNYC; formerly distributed by PRI)
- This American Life, stories of real life hosted by Ira Glass, distributed by Public Radio Exchange
- The Takeaway, a daily news program from WNYC (formerly distributed by PRI)
- The World, news magazine show with an emphasis on international news (formerly distributed by PRI)

==== WNYC Studios ====
- On the Media, covering journalism, technology, and First Amendment issues (formerly distributed by NPR)
- Science Friday, science issues call-in hosted by Ira Flatow and independently produced (formerly distributed by NPR)

==== Independent ====
- Democracy Now!, the flagship news program of the Pacifica Radio network, provides a feed to NPR stations
- Forum, call-in panel discussion program, wide-ranging national and local topics hosted by Michael Krasny (KQED-FM).
- Jazz from Lincoln Center, Wynton Marsalis, formerly hosted by Ed Bradley, Murray Street Productions
- The Merrow Report, education issues hosted by John Merrow, Learning Matters Inc.
- The People's Pharmacy, a call-in and interview program on personal health from WUNC in Chapel Hill, N.C.
- Pulse of the Planet, a daily two-minute sound portrait of Planet Earth, hosted by Jim Metzner.
- StarDate, short segments relating to science and astronomy from the University of Texas at Austin's McDonald Observatory hosted by Billy Henry.
- Sunday Baroque, baroque and early music hosted by Suzanne Bona (WSHU-FM)
- Metropolitan Opera radio broadcasts, regular series of full-length opera performances
- Hearts of Space, weekly program featuring music of a contemplative nature drawn largely from the ambient, new-age and electronic genres, hosted by Stephen Hill

== Controversies ==
=== Allegations of political or ideological bias ===
NPR station WNYC in New York City delved into the question of purported liberal bias on its On the Media program in March 2011. The program invited four conservative listeners to participate in the discussion, and highlighted two studies that assessed the issue of bias in the news media, with differing results. One study (by professors at UCLA and the University of Missouri), which was based on the number of liberal or conservative think-tanks that were cited by a range of news outlets, found that NPR's Morning Edition was somewhat liberal. The other study, by Fairness and Accuracy in Reporting, counted the number of Republicans and Democrats who were heard on Morning Edition and All Things Considered, and found "a very strong slant in favor of the GOP."

Public radio host Lisa Simeone, who worked for NPR from 1998 to 2002, accused NPR's Pentagon reporting of being "little more than Pentagon press releases." The NPR ombudsman has described how NPR's coverage of the Israel-Palestinian conflict has been simultaneously criticized as biased by both sides. University of Texas journalism professor and author Robert Jensen has criticized NPR as taking a pro-war stance during coverage of Iraq war protests. During the 2020 election, NPR declined to cover the controversy surrounding a New York Post article on the Hunter Biden laptop controversy, saying "...we don't want to waste the listeners' and readers' time on stories that are just pure distractions..."

In 2024, veteran NPR journalist Uri Berliner stated that NPR demonstrated a left-wing bias in its reporting after the 2016 United States presidential election, citing NPR's approach to coverage of the Hunter Biden laptop controversy, the Mueller special counsel investigation, the origin of SARS-CoV-2, and the Gaza war. According to Berliner, NPR's management prioritized focus on race and identity politics, while NPR simultaneously lost viewpoint diversity. NPR editor-in-chief Edith Chapin claimed that NPR stood behind its work and defended its policies on inclusion. NPR subsequently suspended Berliner for 5 days without pay, claiming that he did not secure NPR approval to work for another outlet. Berliner subsequently resigned, citing disparagement by CEO Katherine Maher and her divisive views.

==== Euphemisms for "torture" ====
In a controversial act, in 2009 NPR banned the use of the word "torture" in regard to the George W. Bush administration's employment of so-called "enhanced interrogation techniques". NPR Ombudswoman Alicia Shepard's defense of the policy was that "calling waterboarding torture is tantamount to taking sides." UC Berkeley Professor of Linguistics Geoffrey Nunberg pointed out that virtually all media around the world, other than what he called the "spineless U.S. media", call these techniques torture. In an article which criticized NPR and other U.S. media for their use of euphemisms for torture, independent journalist Glenn Greenwald discussed what he called the enabling "corruption of American journalism":

This active media complicity in concealing that our Government created a systematic torture regime, by refusing ever to say so, is one of the principal reasons it was allowed to happen for so long. The steadfast, ongoing refusal of our leading media institutions to refer to what the Bush administration did as "torture" – even in the face of more than 100 detainee deaths; the use of that term by a leading Bush official to describe what was done at Guantanamo; and the fact that media outlets frequently use the word "torture" to describe exactly the same methods when used by other countries – reveals much about how the modern journalist thinks.

=== Live from Death Row commentaries ===
In 1994, NPR arranged to air, on All Things Considered, a series of three-minute commentaries by Mumia Abu-Jamal, a journalist convicted of murdering Philadelphia Police officer Daniel Faulkner. They cancelled the commentaries after the Fraternal Order of Police and members of the U.S. Congress objected.

=== Juan Williams comments ===
On October 20, 2010, NPR terminated Senior News Analyst Juan Williams's independent contract over a series of incidents culminating in remarks he made on the Fox News Channel regarding Muslim head coverings and not feeling comfortable around women wearing them. Williams's firing, which was made abruptly without Williams being given a face-to-face meeting beforehand, was reported by The Washington Post as being a key part of Ellen Weiss, NPR's top news executive at the time, being given an ultimatum on January 4, 2011, to either resign or be fired. On January 6, 2011, NPR announced that Weiss had quit.

=== Ronald Schiller comments ===
In March 2011, conservative political activist and provocateur James O'Keefe sent partners Simon Templar (a pen name) and Shaughn Adeleye to secretly record their discussion with Ronald Schiller, NPR's outgoing senior vice president for fundraising, and an associate, in which Schiller made remarks viewed as disparaging of "the current Republican party, especially the Tea Party", and controversial comments regarding Palestine and funding for NPR. NPR disavowed Schiller's comments. CEO Vivian Schiller, who is not related to Ronald, later resigned over the fallout from the comments and the previous firing of Juan Williams.

=== July 4 reading of the Declaration of Independence ===
From 1988 to 2021, NPR broadcast an annual reading of the 1776 United States Declaration of Independence over the radio. In 2017, it began using Twitter as a medium for reading the document as well. On July 4, 2017, the 100+ tweets were met with considerable opposition, as some online supporters of Donald Trump mistakenly believed the words of the Declaration referring to George III of the United Kingdom were being directed towards the president. The tweets were called "trash" and were accused of being "propaganda", condoning violence and calling for revolution. The July 4, 2022, annual tradition was not held. Instead, referencing the recent Dobbs decision and voting rights, host Steve Inskeep held a discussion on "what equality means" with two historians, contrasting Thomas Jefferson's use of "All men are created equal" in the Declaration with his participation in slavery.

=== Sexual harassment ===
In October 2017, sexual harassment charges were leveled against Michael Oreskes, senior vice president of news and editorial director since 2015. Some of the accusations dated back to when he was Washington, D.C. bureau chief for The New York Times during the 1990s, while others involved his conduct at NPR, where eight women filed sexual harassment complaints against Oreskes. After a report on the Times accusations was published in The Washington Post, NPR put Oreskes on administrative leave, and the following day his resignation was requested. CNN's Brian Stelter reported that NPR staffers were dissatisfied with the handling of Oreskes, were demanding an external investigation, and that Oreskes poisoned the newsroom atmosphere by abusing his position to meet young women. Oreskes resigned at the request of CEO Jarl Mohn, was denied severance and separation benefits, and reimbursed NPR $1,800 in expense account charges related to his meetings with women.

In April 2026, Throughline co-host Ramtin Arablouie left NPR amid an internal investigation. A colleague alleged Arablouie discussed his personal life during one-on-one meetings, made inappropriate comments during team meetings and flirted with guests and a contract employee. The employee said Arablouie described one producer as "a case for race mixing."

=== Elon Musk / Twitter controversy ===
On April 5, 2023, following Elon Musk's acquisition of the American social media platform Twitter, NPR's main Twitter account was designated as "US state-affiliated media". This label was typically reserved for foreign media outlets that directly represented the point of view of their respective governments, like Russia's RT and China's Xinhua. Twitter's designation was widely considered controversial as NPR is an independent news organization that receives only a tiny fraction of its funding from the government. Twitter's previous policy had explicitly mentioned NPR, as well as the United Kingdom's BBC, as examples of networks that were not considered as state-affiliated due to their editorial independence. NPR ceased activity on its main Twitter account in response to the designation.

On April 8, 2023, Twitter changed the designation of NPR's account from "state-affiliated" to "government-funded". On April 10, after managing to get in contact with Musk himself, NPR reporter Bobby Allyn wrote in a tweet that the platform's owner told him he was relying on a list accessible through a Wikipedia category page, named "Category:Publicly funded broadcasters", to determine which news organizations' accounts should be deemed as "government-funded media".

On April 12, NPR announced that its accounts would no longer be active on Twitter, citing the platform's "inaccurate and misleading" labeling of NPR as "government-funded media" despite the fact that it receives "less than 1 percent of its $300 million annual budget" from the Corporation for Public Broadcasting. In its last post on the platform, the network shared links to its alternative newsletters, websites and social media profiles in a thread.

In an email to the staff explaining the decision, CEO John Lansing allowed individual NPR journalists and staffers to choose for themselves whether to keep using Twitter, while noting that "it would be a disservice to the serious work you all do here to continue to share it on a platform that is associating the federal charter for public media with an abandoning of editorial independence or standards."

After NPR stopped posting on Twitter, Elon Musk threatened to forcefully reassign the @NPR handle to another user if NPR did not reactivate its Twitter activity.

== Publications ==
- The NPR Guide to Building a Classical CD Collection by Ted Libbey (1994) ISBN 156305051X
- The NPR Classical Music Companion: An Essential Guide for Enlightened Listening by Miles Hoffman (1997) ISBN 0618619453
- The NPR Classical Music Companion: Terms and Concepts from A to Z by Miles Hoffman (1997) ISBN 0395707420
- The NPR Curious Listener's Guide to Classical Music by Tim Smith (2002) ISBN 0399527958
- The NPR Curious Listener's Guide to Jazz by Loren Schoenberg (2002) ISBN 039952794X
- The NPR Curious Listener's Guide to Opera by William Berger (2002) ISBN 0399527435
- The NPR Curious Listener's Guide to Popular Standards by Max Morath (2002) ISBN 0399527443
- The NPR Curious Listener's Guide To American Folk Music by Kip Lornell (2004) ISBN 0399530339
- The NPR Curious Listener's Guide to World Music by Chris Nickson (2004) ISBN 0399530320
- The NPR Curious Listener's Guide To Blues by David Evans (2005) ISBN 039953072X
- The NPR Curious Listener's Guide to Celtic Music by Fiona Ritchie (2005) ISBN 0399530711
- The NPR Listener's Encyclopedia of Classical Music by Ted Libbey (2006) ISBN 0761120726

== See also ==
- Australian Broadcasting Corporation
- BBC Radio
- Canadian Broadcasting Corporation
- List of NPR personnel
- List of NPR stations
- NPR Berlin – before its closure, the only NPR affiliate operated by NPR itself
- Voice of America
- Sound Reporting: The NPR Guide to Audio Journalism and Production
