= 2016 Democratic Party presidential debates and forums =

A total of ten debates occurred among candidates in the campaign for the Democratic Party's nomination for the president of the United States in the 2016 presidential election (This was in contrast to 12 Republican debates.).

Several forums, in which candidates do not respond directly to each other, were later also announced, with the support of the DNC.

== Presidential debates ==
=== Schedule ===
The Democratic National Committee (DNC) announced on May 5, 2015, that there would be 6 debates, which they considered "a reasonable number and in line with what the national committee sanctioned in 2008." On August 6, 2015, the DNC announced the locations for all six original debates, with exact venues still to be determined, and the specific dates for the first four debates.

In late January 2016, trailing the New Hampshire primary race, the Clinton campaign requested a second New Hampshire debate, which had already been scheduled to February 4, to be officially sanctioned by the DNC. The Sanders campaign said they would only agree with that proposal if a total of four additional debates would be held, one in February, March, April and May each. Both campaigns agreed to a March 3 debate in Flint, Michigan. There also seemed to be agreement on a California debate on May 24, but not at the remaining April 14 debate in Brooklyn, New York, as proposed by Sanders. On February 3, just ahead of the second New Hampshire debate, Clinton's and Sanders's campaigns agreed in principle to holding four more debates, also sanctioned by the DNC, for a total of 10.

Debates among candidates for the 2016 Democratic Party U.S. presidential nomination
No.	Date	Time	Place	Sponsor(s)	Invitees^{*}				
P Participant I Invitee (to a future debate) N Non-invitee A Absent invitee O Out of race (exploring or withdrawn)					Chafee	Clinton	O'Malley	Sanders	Webb
DNC sanctioned debates
1	Tue Oct. 13, 2015	5:30 p.m. PDT	Wynn Las Vegas; Paradise, NV	CNN/Facebook	P	P	P	P	P
2	Sat Nov. 14, 2015	8 p.m. CST	Drake University; Des Moines, IA	CBS News/KCCI/ The Des Moines Register/Twitter	O	P	P	P	O
3	Sat Dec. 19, 2015	8 p.m. EST	St. Anselm College; Goffstown, NH	ABC News	O	P	P	P	O
4	Sun Jan. 17, 2016	9 p.m. EST	Gaillard Center; Charleston, SC	NBC News/YouTube/Congressional; Black Caucus Institute	O	P	P	P	O
5	Thu Feb. 4, 2016	9 p.m. EST	University of New Hampshire; Durham, NH	MSNBC	O	P	O	P	O
6	Thu Feb. 11, 2016	8 p.m. CST	University of Wisconsin–Milwaukee; Milwaukee, WI	PBS/WETA-TV/Facebook	O	P	O	P	O
7	Sun Mar. 6, 2016	8 p.m. EST	The Whiting in Flint Cultural Center; Flint, MI	CNN	O	P	O	P	O
8	Wed Mar. 9, 2016	9 p.m. EST	Miami Dade College; Miami, FL	Univision/The Washington Post/CNN	O	P	O	P	O
9	Thu Apr. 14, 2016	9 p.m. EDT	Duggal Greenhouse in Brooklyn Navy Yard; Brooklyn, NY	CNN/NY1	O	P	O	P	O
10	May 2016	N/A	San Francisco, California (canceled)	Fox News Channel	N	N	N	N	N
_{*}Participating in at least one debate listed above: Former Gov. Lincoln Chafee of Rhode Island • Former Secretary of State Hillary Clinton of New York • Former Gov. Martin O'Malley of Maryland • Sen. Bernie Sanders of Vermont • Former Sen. Jim Webb of Virginia

=== Ratings ===
The following table lists the ratings (number of estimated viewers) of the debates to date.

Debate	Date	Viewers	Network
1	October 13, 2015	15.8 million	CNN
2	November 14, 2015	8.5 million	CBS
3	December 19, 2015	7.8 million	ABC
4	January 17, 2016	10.2 million	NBC
5	February 4, 2016	4.5 million	MSNBC
6	February 11, 2016	8.0 million	PBS
7	March 6, 2016	5.5 million	CNN
8	March 9, 2016	5.9 million	Univision/CNN
9	April 14, 2016	5.6 million	CNN/NY1

Sites of the 2016 Democratic primary debates

=== Tuesday October 13, 2015 – Paradise, Nevada ===
Candidate	Airtime	Polls
Clinton	28:05	43.3%
Sanders	31:05	25.1%
Webb	15:35	0.9%
O'Malley	17:56	0.4%
Chafee	9:11	0.3%

The Democratic Party's first presidential debate ahead of the 2016 U.S. presidential election was held on October 13, 2015, at the Wynn Hotel on the Las Vegas Strip in Paradise, Nevada.

Starting at 8:30 p.m. and ending at 11:00 p.m. Eastern time, it aired on CNN and was broadcast on radio by Westwood One. Anderson Cooper was the moderator of the debate, with Dana Bash and Juan Carlos Lopez asking additional questions and Don Lemon presenting questions submitted by voters via Facebook.

To be invited to the debate, a candidate had to achieve an average of at least 1% in three recognized national polls released between August 1 and October 10. In addition, a candidate had to either file a statement of candidacy with the Federal Election Commission or declare that one would be filed by October 14, the day after the debate. The latter criterion would have accommodated Vice President Joe Biden had he decided to enter the presidential race as late as the day of the debate. CNN had an extra lectern available to install for Biden, but he took no action to enter the campaign before the debate.

Analysis on the debate was largely mixed regarding who, between the top two candidates, won. Some analysts from CNN and BBC viewed Clinton as the winner, while other publications such as The Washington Post, the Chicago Tribune, and the Fox News Channel, claimed that Sanders was the winner. Conversely, Chafee, O'Malley and Webb were all widely regarded as the "losers". One of the most memorable moments from the debate, which drew an average of 15.3 million viewers, a record for a Democratic debate, came when Sanders replied to a question about Clinton's email controversy that the American people were "sick and tired of hearing about your damn emails", which drew cheers and applause from the audience and a smile and handshake between the two candidates. With regard to social media, Sanders had the biggest gains of the night on Twitter and Facebook, with an increase of 46,000 new followers and 35,000 new likes, respectively; over the course of the night, he was also the most-searched candidate on Google. Conversely, Clinton had the biggest gains on Instagram, with 25,000 likes for her photograph of her podium just before the debate started. It was noted that Republican frontrunner Donald Trump, who was live-Tweeting during the entire debate and mocking the candidates, gained more Twitter followers over the course of the night than all of the five candidates combined, with over 70,000 new followers.

With the focus primarily being on Clinton and Sanders, a majority of subsequent fact-checking in the aftermath of the debate was regarding comments made by the two of them. Fact-checking by the Associated Press and USA Today pointed out mistakes in both of their presentations: specifically, Clinton was considered inconsistent in many of her policy stances, particularly with regard to the Obama administration's handling of the Syrian Civil War as well as the Trans-Pacific Partnership agreement that Clinton supported as Secretary of State, but changed to opposing while a candidate. In contrast, Sanders was pointed out as making economic claims based on outdated information, particularly with regard to how much of America's GDP actually goes to the wealthiest in the country.

This was the first and only debate appearance of Chafee and Webb, who ended their campaigns on October 23 and October 20, respectively.

- First presidential debate of the Democrats in Las Vegas on YouTube

=== Saturday November 14, 2015 – Des Moines, Iowa ===
Candidate	Airtime	Polls
Clinton	38:33	54.7%
Sanders	24:17	33.0%
O'Malley	21:28	2.7%

The Democratic Party's second presidential debate ahead of the 2016 U.S. presidential election was held on November 14, 2015, at the Sheslow Auditorium at Drake University in Des Moines, Iowa.

It aired on CBS News and was also broadcast by KCCI and The Des Moines Register. This was the first debate to be broadcast over nationwide network television, the previous debate having gone over cable.

CBS News Political Director John Dickerson was the principal moderator, with participation by Kevin Cooney of KCCI.

The day before the debate, November 13, was the day of the November 2015 Paris attacks, where nearly 130 civilians were killed by radical Jihadist terrorists - specifically, members of ISIS - across the city of Paris. As a result of the attacks, after initial speculation that the debate might be cancelled, CBS announced that, while the debate would go on as planned, the focus of the debate's content would be dramatically shifted over to foreign policy and terrorism. In addition, a moment of silence was held at the beginning of the debate in memory of the victims.

One of the most memorable moments of the debate was when Clinton defended against claims that she had ties to Wall Street bankers, particularly when Sanders pointed out that some of Clinton's largest donors were from Wall Street. Clinton retaliated by claiming that, as the Senator from New York during the September 11 attacks, she had to work closely with Wall Street since the attacks were so close to Wall Street. Clinton immediately received scrutiny over these comments, including when Dickerson highlighted a Tweet from a viewer reading, "Never before have I heard someone use 9/11 to justify millions of Wall Street donations," which drew thunderous applause from the audience, and led to both Sanders and O'Malley also attacking Clinton for those comments. Post-debate criticisms arose from all across the political spectrum, from Republican National Committee Chairman Reince Priebus, to Clinton's own former campaign manager, Patti Solis Doyle, who said that the 9/11 reference would've been better used in the previous discussion on terrorism and foreign policy, not justifying her Wall Street connections.

The New York Times and many other media organizations have heavily criticized Clinton for invoking 9/11 to cover her Wall Street connections.

- Second presidential debate of the Democrats in Des Moines on CBS News

=== Saturday December 19, 2015 – Goffstown, New Hampshire ===
Candidate	Airtime	Polls
Clinton	38:14	56.3%
Sanders	30:20	30.6%
O'Malley	24:20	4.3%

The Democratic Party's third presidential debate ahead of the 2016 U.S. presidential election was held on December 19, 2015, at St. Anselm College, in Goffstown, New Hampshire.

It aired on ABC News and was moderated by journalist David Muir, anchor of World News Tonight, and Chief Global Affairs Correspondent Martha Raddatz. On December 11, 2015, the DNC had announced that it would revoke the sponsorship of the debate by WMUR-TV because of a labor dispute with its unionized employees. The topics covered during the debate included Sanders' campaign's breach of Clinton's campaign data, strategy for defeating ISIS, gun control, the issue of whether to depose President Assad of Syria, if Wall Street favored each candidate, stability in the Middle East enforced by dictators and whether regime change was necessary, and the role of the First Spouse.

- Third presidential debate of the Democrats in Goffstown on YouTube

=== Sunday January 17, 2016 – Charleston, South Carolina ===
Candidate	Airtime	Polls
Clinton	30:12	51.0%
Sanders	27:31	38.3%
O'Malley	14:29	2.3%

The Democratic Party's fourth presidential debate ahead of the 2016 Democratic primaries, and the first one in 2016, was held on January 17, 2016, at the Gaillard Center, a venue for performing arts in Charleston, South Carolina.

Held from 9 to 11 pm ET, it was facilitated by Lester Holt and Andrea Mitchell. The location was 7.6 miles southeast of the North Charleston Coliseum, where the last Republican debate had been held on January 14, and the debate aired on NBC News and YouTube. It was also sponsored by the Congressional Black Caucus. It was notable as being the final debate before the start of precinct caucuses and primary voting. On January 8, NBC News announced that in order to qualify for the debate, a candidate must have reached an average of at least 5% either in national polls, or in Iowa, New Hampshire, or South Carolina, based on the five most recent polls recognized by NBC News released before January 14.

Both before and after the debate, commentators said the debate was focused on Sanders and his voting record on gun control and slights against President Obama, among other issues. During the debate, O'Malley interrupted to take 30 seconds to talk about "homeland security and preparedness". Also during the debate, Clinton and Sanders had some back-and-forth exchanges to define themselves on Wall Street, foreign policy, and gun control.

Chris Cillizza of The Washington Post viewed Sanders as the winner of the debate, while also praising O'Malley. According to Cillizza, Clinton was, "as always, solid," but "she did nothing in the debate to slow the momentum that Sanders is building in Iowa and New Hampshire."

This was the fourth and final debate appearance of O'Malley, who suspended his campaign on February 1.

- Fourth presidential debate of the Democrats in Charleston on YouTube

=== Thursday February 4, 2016 – Durham, New Hampshire ===
Candidate	Airtime	Polls
Clinton	~ 1 hour	50.4%
Sanders	~ 1 hour	36.3%

The Democratic Party's fifth presidential debate ahead of the 2016 U.S. presidential election was held on February 4, 2016, in Durham, New Hampshire.

On January 26, NBC News and the New Hampshire Union Leader announced plans to hold an unsanctioned debate in New Hampshire on February 4, to be moderated by Chuck Todd and Rachel Maddow. Clinton, Sanders, and O'Malley all received an invitation to the debate, with O'Malley being the first to confirm his participation. On January 31, the DNC officially sanctioned the debate but removed the Union Leader as a sponsor, and each major Democratic candidate confirmed their attendance. O'Malley suspended his campaign after a poor showing in the Iowa caucuses, thereby leaving Clinton and Sanders as the remaining participants. The debate aired on February 4, 2016, from 9 to 11 pm ET on MSNBC.

Commentators of the debate cited the elevated discourse between the candidates. There was discussion on the death penalty (federal versus state), money in politics, and assessing Russia, Iran, and North Korea as threats to national security. Clinton demanded that Sanders explain his "artful smears" of Clinton receiving campaign donations. Sanders responded by critiquing the inherently "quid-pro-quo" nature of Wall Street campaign donations. The exchange between the two candidates was called by Eric Levitz one of the best 10-minute exchanges in the history of American political debates.

- Fifth presidential debate of the Democrats in Durham on YouTube

=== Thursday February 11, 2016 – Milwaukee, Wisconsin ===
Candidate	Airtime	Polls
Clinton	~ 1 hour	49.3%
Sanders	~ 1 hour	36.0%

The Democratic Party's sixth presidential debate ahead of the 2016 U.S. presidential election was held on February 11, 2016, at the University of Wisconsin–Milwaukee, in Milwaukee, Wisconsin.

Starting at 8:00 pm CST, the debate was aired on PBS and simulcast by CNN. Two anchors of PBS NewsHour, Gwen Ifill and Judy Woodruff, moderated for the two candidates.

The debate preshow ran for 30 minutes before the debate. Clinton noted it was a new milestone among presidential debates as more women were on the debate stage than men (3:1). After opening statements with Sanders going first, each candidate had 90 seconds to answer and then the other was given a 30-second response. There were two short breaks. During a break, highlights of the debate were shown by Hari Sreenivasan with political commentary from Lisa Desjardins, Amy Walter, and Tamara Keith weighing in on what had been said.

The candidates debated on race relations, the size of government, funding their goals, Medicaid/Medicare, campaign contributor's influence, the prospect of a first woman president, affordable college, reducing areas of government, readiness for an attack on America, Henry Kissinger, Russian relations, the U.S. role with respect to refugees, influential leaders on foreign policy, and criticism of President Barack Obama. In closing statements, Sanders talked about bringing people together to create a representative government. Clinton's closing talked about not being a single issue candidate and taking on all barriers to people achieving their individual potentials.

After the debate, the commentators were asked if the candidates did what they needed to do. Then Sreenivasan interviewed journalists David Brooks and Mark Shields in the postdebate coverage.

- Sixth presidential debate of the Democrats in Milwaukee on YouTube

=== Sunday March 6, 2016 – Flint, Michigan ===
Candidate	Airtime	Polls
Clinton	42:11	49.6%
Sanders	42:41	40.2%

The Democratic Party's seventh presidential debate ahead of the 2016 U.S. presidential election was held on March 6, 2016, at The Whiting, Flint Cultural Center, in Flint, Michigan.

The city chosen was the epicenter of the ongoing Flint water crisis. Starting at 8.00 pm EST, the debate aired on CNN and was moderated by Anderson Cooper. He was joined by CNN's Don Lemon in asking questions. The debate ran for almost two hours. At the end of the debate, Cooper announced a labor union fund had committed $25 million in low-interest loans towards repairing the water system.

The Michigan Democratic Party claimed the organization had no tickets to distribute leading up to the debate for the general public, party volunteers & major party donors, however sent out open public emails with links to open invites for any person interested in attending a pre-debate reception and dinner on March 5, combined with debate tickets for March 6, that would be willing to purchase tickets for $1,000 to $20,000 per package via EventBrite.

Candidates were given 75 seconds to respond and 30 seconds for follow-ups. Members of the audience, made up of Democrats and Independents, were also given the chance to field questions, which were screened to avoid overlapping in content. Sanders and Clinton were given 60 seconds for opening statements and for closing statements at the end of the debate.

A subsequent WikiLeaks email dump suggested that DNC vice chair Donna Brazile gave Clinton an unfair advantage in the debate with Sanders, revealed by Brazille's email message on March 5, 2016, to John Podesta and Jennifer Palmieri with the title: "One of the questions directed to HRC tomorrow is from a woman with a rash." The message continued, "her family has lead poison and she will ask what, if anything, will Hillary do as president to help the ppl of Flint."

- Seventh presidential debate of the Democrats in Flint on YouTube

=== Wednesday March 9, 2016 – Miami, Florida ===
Candidate	Airtime	Polls
Clinton	23:29	51.0%
Sanders	17:51	39.6%

The Democratic Party's eighth presidential debate ahead of the 2016 U.S. presidential election was held on March 9, 2016, in Building 7 of the Kendall Campus of Miami Dade College in Miami, Florida.

Starting at 9:00 pm Eastern Standard Time, it was broadcast through a partnership between Univision and The Washington Post. The debate was discussed during a job interview conducted in early 2015 between the Democratic National Committee's then-Communications Director Mo Elleithee and future Hispanic Media Director Pablo Manriquez. After starting at the DNC in April 2015, Manriquez "talked about the idea for a debate for Democratic candidates on Univision to anyone who had ears to listen." The debate was officially announced on November 2, 2015.

- Eight presidential debate of the Democrats in Miami on YouTube

=== Thursday April 14, 2016 – Brooklyn, New York ===
The Democratic Party's ninth presidential debate ahead of the 2016 U.S. presidential election was held on April 14, 2016, at the Duggal Greenhouse in Brooklyn Navy Yard. The debate aired on CNN and NY1. Wolf Blitzer of CNN served as moderator.

=== Planned May debate/Potential Sanders/Trump debate ===
Despite previously agreeing to a tenth debate in the state of California, before the last day of primary elections, Hillary Clinton declined to participate. As a result of this, the debate was cancelled. Bernie Sanders called it insulting to the people of California, the largest primary state.

After it had been established that a California debate would not take place, Donald Trump offered a debate with Bernie Sanders ahead of the June 7th primary. The only condition for this debate was for the profits to be donated to a charity, which the candidates would agree on. Bernie Sanders accepted the offer; however, Donald Trump eventually declined to participate, stating there was no need to debate a candidate who would not win the Democratic nomination.

== Forums ==
In addition to the main debates, twelve forums were scheduled for the candidates to discuss the issues.

=== Schedule ===
Forums among candidates for the 2016 Democratic Party U.S. presidential nomination
No.	Date	Time	Place	Sponsor(s)	Invitees^{*}		
P Participant I Invitee (to a future debate) N Non-invitee A Absent invitee O Out of race (exploring or withdrawn)					Fmr. Sec. of State Clinton	Fmr. Gov. O'Malley	Sen. Sanders
Forums
1	Nov. 6, 2015	8 p.m. EST	Winthrop University; Rock Hill, SC	MSNBC	P	P	P
2	Nov. 24, 2015	N/A	virtual MoveOn.org	MoveOn.org	A	P	P
3	Jan. 11, 2016	7 p.m. CST	Drake University; Des Moines, IA	Fusion	P	P	P
4	Jan. 25, 2016	9 p.m. EST	Drake University; Des Moines, IA	CNN	P	P	P
5	Feb. 3, 2016	9 p.m. EST	Adams Memorial Opera House; Derry, NH	CNN	P	O	P
6	Feb. 18, 2016	9 p.m. EST	Keep Memory Alive Event Center; Las Vegas, NV	MSNBC/Telemundo	P	O	P
7	Feb. 23, 2016	8 p.m. EST	University of South Carolina; Columbia, SC	CNN	P	O	P
8	Mar. 7, 2016	6 p.m. EST	Gem Theatre; Detroit, MI	Fox News Channel	P	O	P
9	Mar. 13, 2016	8 p.m. EST	Mershon Auditorium; Columbus, OH	CNN/TV One	P	O	P
10	Mar. 14, 2016	6 p.m. EST	Ohio State University Columbus, OH; Old Capitol Building Springfield, IL	MSNBC	P	O	P
11	Mar. 21, 2016	8 p.m. EDT	Washington, D.C.	CNN	P	O	P
12	Mar. 30, 2016	7 p.m. EDT	Wisconsin and New York City	MSNBC	P	O	P
13	Apr. 25, 2016	8 p.m. EDT	National Constitution Center; Philadelphia, PA	MSNBC	P	O	P
_{*}Participating in at least one debate listed above: Former Secretary of State Hillary Clinton of New York • Former Gov. Martin O'Malley of Maryland • Sen. Bernie Sanders of Vermont

Sites of the 2016 Democratic primary forums

=== November 6, 2015 – Rock Hill, South Carolina ===
Rachel Maddow was selected to moderate the First in the South Candidates Forum with Hillary Clinton, Bernie Sanders, and Martin O'Malley, which was held at Winthrop University in Rock Hill, South Carolina, on November 6, co-sponsored by the Democratic Parties of 13 southern states. The forum was not in debate format; instead, each candidate was interviewed individually and sequentially. Lincoln Chafee and Jim Webb were also invited, but their campaigns never responded to the invitations, and both subsequently withdrew from the race. Lessig attempted multiple times to enter the debates but was systematically excluded by the DNC.

A Public Policy Poll of South Carolina Democratic voters conducted from November 7–8, after the forum, discovered that 67% of viewers thought Clinton won the forum, 16% thought Sanders won, and 6% thought O'Malley won, with 11% unsure.

=== November 24, 2015 – MoveOn.org ===
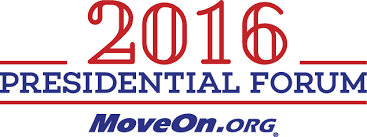

The second forum for the Democratic primaries occurred on November 24, 2015. On October 21, 2015, MoveOn announced that it would host a candidate forum to be recorded and aired online in mid-November. The announcement came amid ongoing unrest within the Democratic party over the unusually low number of Democratic debates allowed by the DNC. While five candidates – Lincoln Chafee, Hillary Clinton, Lawrence Lessig, Martin O'Malley, and Bernie Sanders – were invited, only Sanders and O'Malley appeared at the event. Although this was the first forum between the candidates in which Lessig was invited, he dropped out of the race before the forum was to be held.

The two candidates delivered responses on Social Security, student debt, gun violence, immigration, campaign finance reform, climate change, the progressive movement, the Syrian refugee crisis, the economy, racial profiling, and police brutality, and gave closing statements.

=== January 11, 2016 – Des Moines, Iowa ===
The third forum, the Iowa Brown and Black Forum, occurred on January 11, 2016, at Drake University in Des Moines, Iowa. Focusing on minority issues, it aired on Fusion.

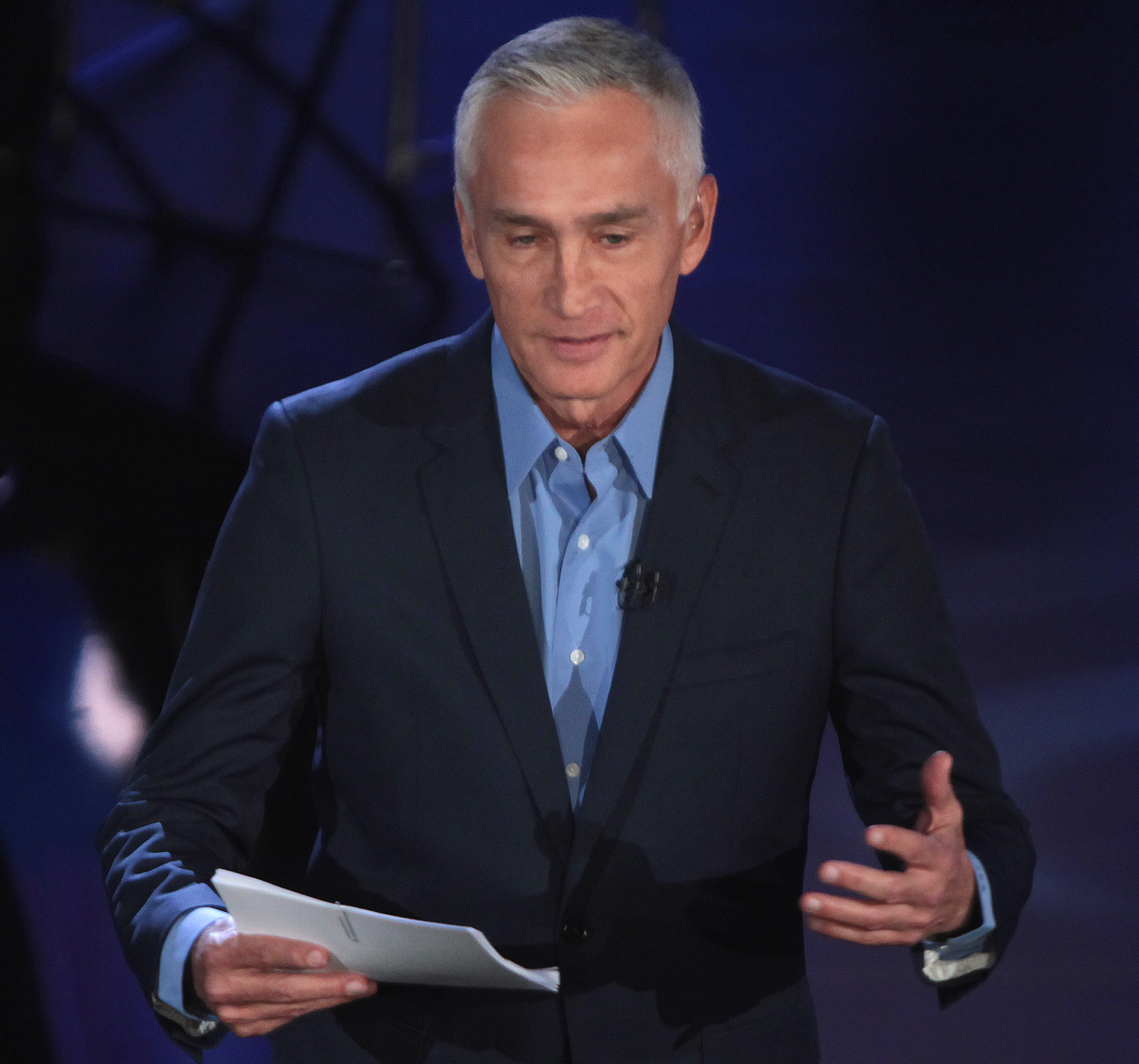
Jorge Ramos moderating the forum

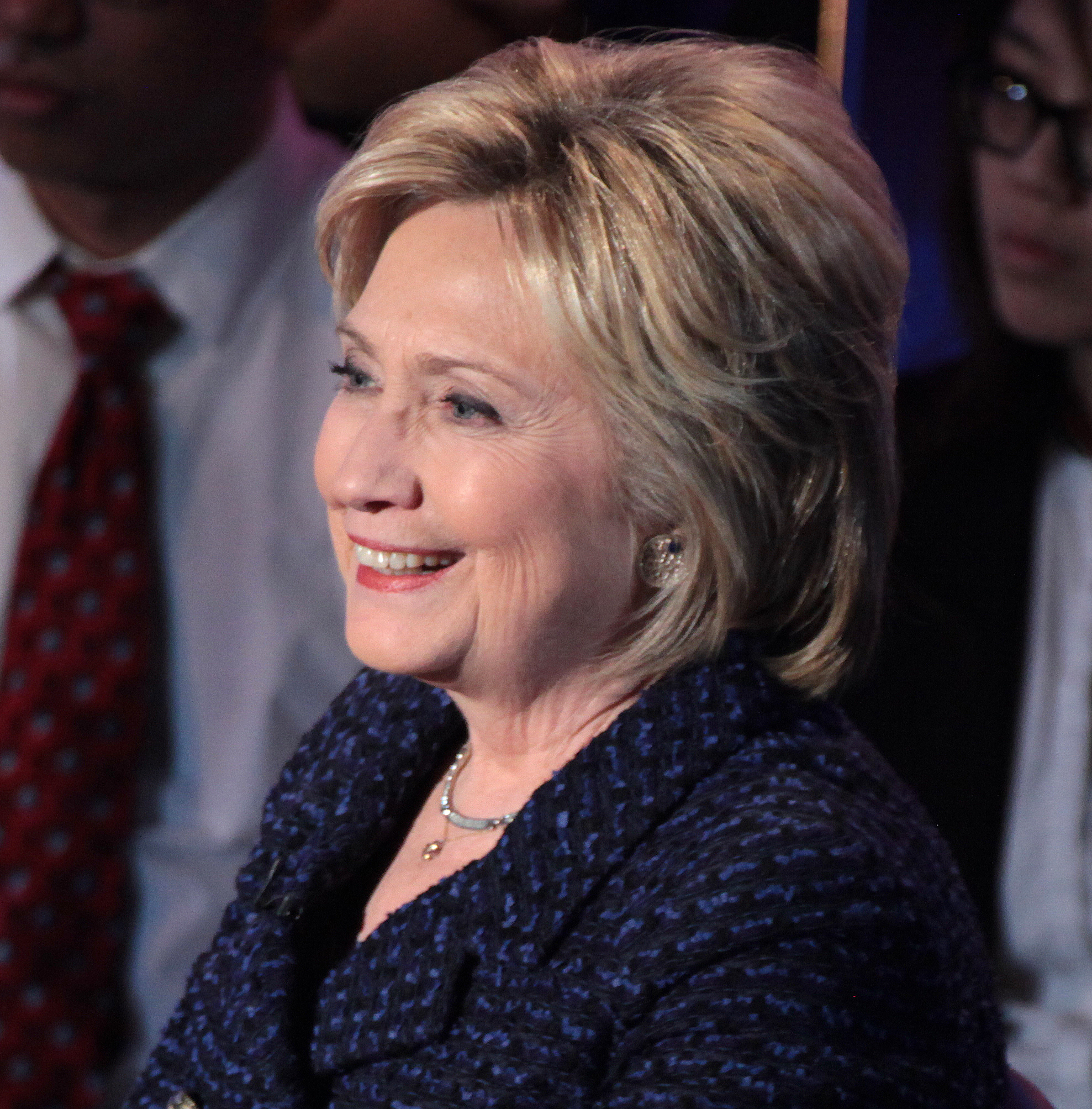
Clinton during the forum

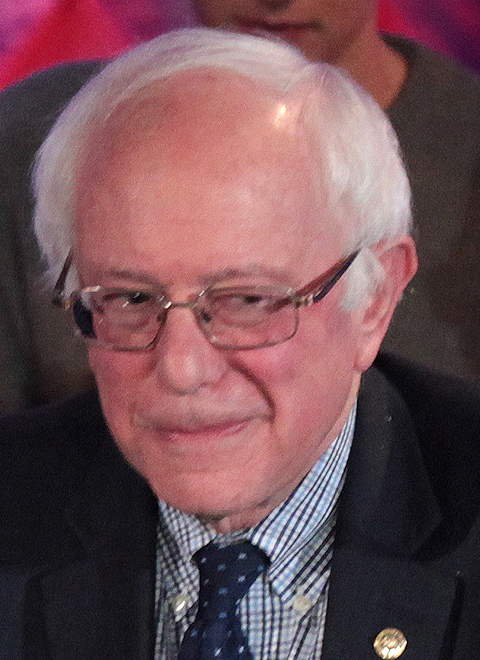
Sanders during the forum

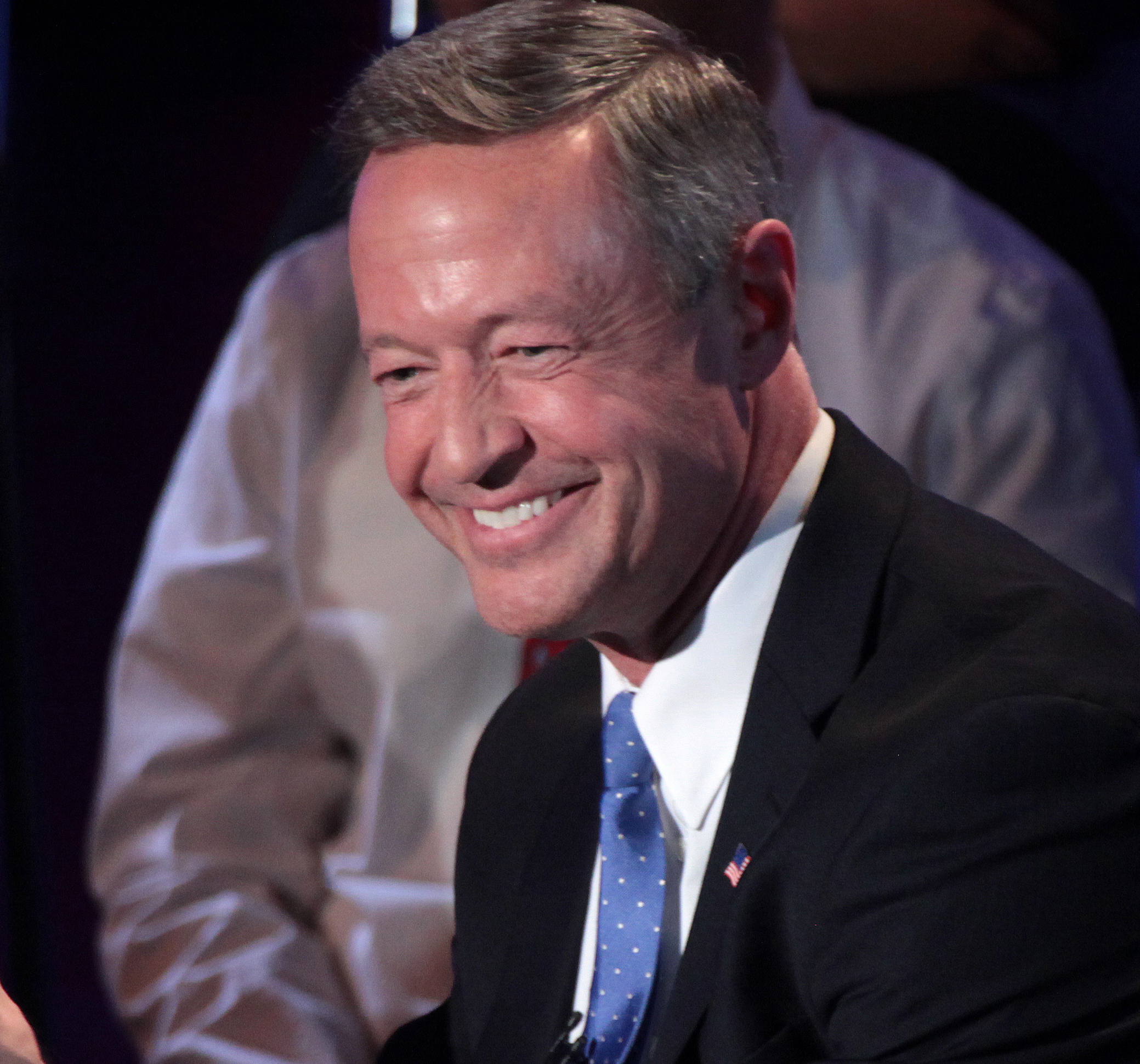
O'Malley during the forum

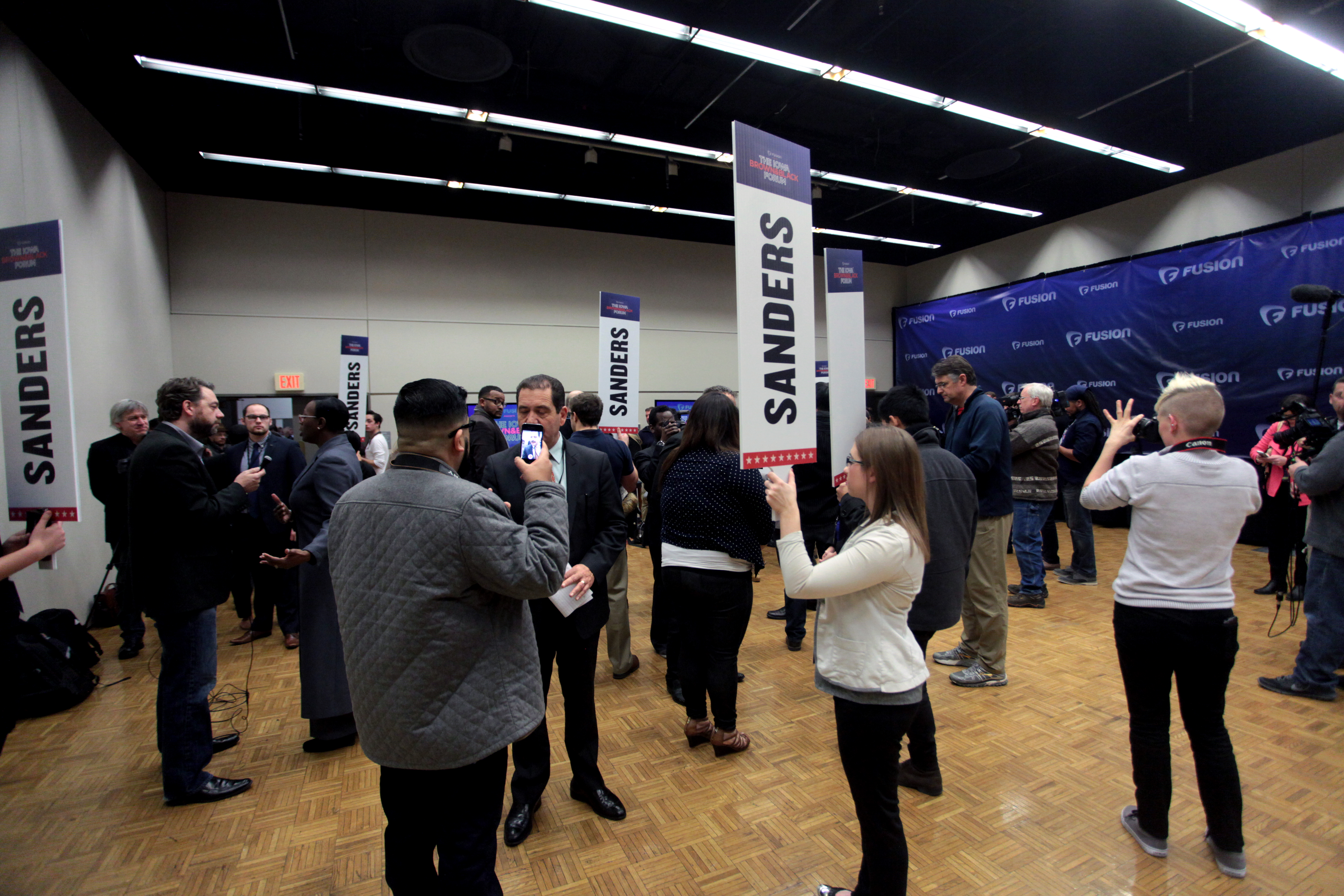
Sanders contingent in the spin room

=== January 25, 2016 – Des Moines, Iowa ===
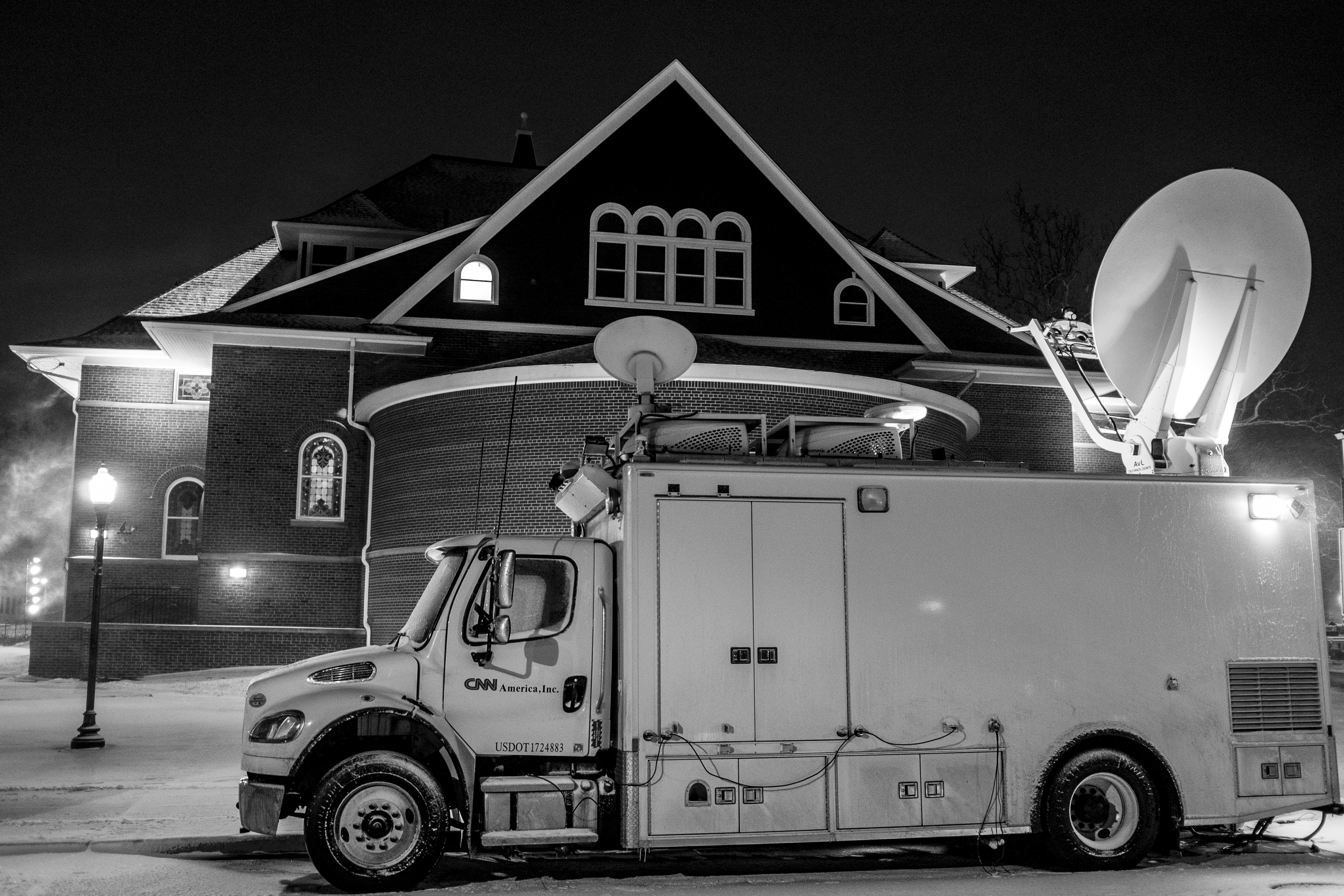
CNN broadcasting van outside of the fourth forum

The fourth forum was a Town Hall held on January 25, 2016, also at Drake University in Des Moines, Iowa. Focusing on "Progressive revolution and change", it aired on CNN.

=== February 3, 2016 – Derry, New Hampshire ===
The fifth forum, a Town Hall event, happened on February 3, 2016, at "Adams Opera House" in Derry, New Hampshire. Focusing on the several topics for "progressive proposals", it aired on CNN.

=== February 18, 2016 – Las Vegas, Nevada ===
The sixth forum, a Town Hall event, occurred on February 18, 2016, at the Keep Memory Alive (KMA) event center in Las Vegas, Nevada. It aired on MSNBC and Telemundo. Sanders was asked a series of questions before the microphone was turned over to Hillary Rodham Clinton. A number of questions were directed at Latino and American-Islamic issues and some questions were asked in Spanish. Young voters and first-time voters also spoke.

=== February 23, 2016 – Columbia, South Carolina ===
The seventh forum and Town Hall event was held at 8:00 pm EST on February 23, 2016, at the campus of the University of South Carolina in Columbia, South Carolina. It was aired on CNN.

=== March 7, 2016 – Detroit, Michigan ===
The eighth forum, a Town Hall event, was held at 6:00 p.m. EST on March 7, 2016, at the Gem Theatre in Detroit, Michigan, on the Fox News Channel. The forum was moderated by Bret Baier.

=== March 13, 2016 – Columbus, Ohio ===
The ninth forum was held at 8:00 pm EDT on March 13, 2016, at the campus of Ohio State University in Columbus, Ohio, and aired on CNN.

=== March 14, 2016 – Columbus, Ohio and Springfield, Illinois ===
The tenth forum was held at 6:00 pm EDT on March 14, 2016, at the campus of Ohio State University in Columbus, Ohio, and at the Old State Capitol State Historic Site in Springfield, Illinois. It aired on MSNBC. The first section of the town hall with Bernie Sanders was moderated by Chuck Todd in Columbus; the second section of the town hall with Hillary Clinton was moderated by Chris Matthews in Springfield.

=== March 21, 2016 – Washington, D.C. ===
The eleventh forum was held at 8:00 pm EDT on March 21, 2016. This was known as the Final Five Forum by CNN, and included Hillary Clinton, Donald Trump, Ted Cruz and John Kasich live, with Bernie Sanders participating remotely. The event was hosted by Anderson Cooper.

=== March 30, 2016 – Wisconsin and New York City ===
The twelfth forum was held at 7:00 pm EDT on March 30, 2016. This was a four-hour special on MSNBC, with the first hour featuring John Kasich in Queens, New York in a town hall format moderated by Chuck Todd, with the next hour being a town hall with Donald Trump in Green Bay, Wisconsin moderated by Chris Matthews. Rachel Maddow conducted back-to-back one-on-one interviews with Hillary Clinton and Bernie Sanders.

=== April 25, 2016 – Philadelphia, Pennsylvania ===
The thirteenth forum was held on April 25, 2016, at the National Constitution Center in Philadelphia, Pennsylvania on MSNBC. Chris Hayes interviewed Bernie Sanders at 8:00 pm EDT, and Rachel Maddow interviewed Hillary Clinton at 9:00 pm EDT.

== Criticism and controversy ==
=== Number of debates ===
Bernie Sanders and Martin O'Malley criticized the number of DNC debates, saying that there should have been more of them. The DNC had scheduled six debates, the same number it had scheduled in the previous two contested primaries, 2004 and 2008. Democratic Party candidates are not formally allowed to participate in non-sanctioned debates if they want to participate in the official DNC debates. However, that rule is unenforceable if candidates jointly agree to additional debates or if the sanctioned debates are already over, as was the case in 2016 and in previous years when additional debates were scheduled.

Criticism over the number of debates reached a peak at the DNC's national meeting in Minneapolis on August 28. State Senator Martha Fuller Clark, vice chair of the New Hampshire Democratic Party, reportedly had an "intense discussion" about the number of debates with DNC chairwoman Debbie Wasserman Schultz. During the national meeting, candidate Martin O'Malley criticized DNC officials for the lack of debates. Cecil Benjamin, chair of the Democratic Party of the US Virgin Islands, interrupted the meeting to offer a motion to increase the number of debates; the motion received applause and cheers from the audience.

In early September, Congresswoman Tulsi Gabbard and former Mayor of Minneapolis R. T. Rybak released a statement calling for more debates and for releasing the restrictions imposed to keep candidates from participating in non-DNC debates. Former DNC chair Howard Dean expressed his disappointment in the rule barring candidates from non-DNC debates, saying "It's not right." A small protest took place outside the DNC headquarters in Washington, D.C., on September 16 calling for more debates. On September 18, House Minority Leader Nancy Pelosi echoed calls for more debates in an interview with the Los Angeles Times.

On September 19, 2015, during her speech at the New Hampshire Democratic Party convention, DNC chair Wasserman Schultz was heckled with shouts for more debates. On September 22, the Vermont Democratic Party sent a letter to the DNC calling for more debates.

=== Black Lives Matter debate ===
A week after the first debate was held in Las Vegas, the organization Black Lives Matter (which plays a central part in the movement of the same name) launched a petition targeted at the DNC and chairwoman Debbie Wasserman Schultz demanding more debates, and "specifically for a #BlackLivesMatter themed Presidential debate." The petition received over 10,000 signatures within 24 hours of being launched, and had over 33,000 signatures as of October 27. The DNC said that it would permit presidential candidates to attend a presidential town hall organized by activists, but that it would not add another debate to its official schedule. In response, the organization released a press statement on its Facebook page stating that "[i]n consultation with our chapters, our communities, allies, and supporters, we remain unequivocal that a Presidential Town Hall with support from the DNC does not sufficiently respond to the concerns raised by our members", continuing to demand a full additional debate.

=== Candidates invited to debate ===
Harvard professor Lawrence Lessig, who announced his campaign on September 6, criticized the requirement that Democratic candidates must earn at least 1% in three major national polls in the six weeks before the debate. His criticism was centered on the fact that he was excluded from most polls because the Democratic National Committee (DNC) did not officially welcome him to the campaign as it had done for all five other candidates. In the two weeks following his announcement, Lessig was only included in one national poll, in which he met the 1% requirement; other national polls included Vice President Biden, who had yet to announce whether he was running. The day before the CNN debate, the Bloomberg Editorial Board published an editorial entitled, "Let All the Candidates Debate, Democrats," calling for the DNC to include Lessig in the debate, but this demand went unheeded.

Lessig, upon his withdrawal from the campaign, was quoted as saying that "from the start it was clear that getting into the Democratic debates was the essential step in this campaign. I may be known in tiny corners of the tubes of the internets, but I am not well-known to the American public generally." Lessig acknowledged that in order to raise the discussion of campaign finance reform in the 2016 election, getting into debates was key. "But last week, we learned that the Democratic party has changed its rules for inclusion in the debate," he said. The DNC debate-qualifying rule originally required a candidate to poll at least 1% in three national polls during the six weeks prior to a debate. Under the new rule, which Lessig stated was the reason for his campaign suspension, a candidate is required to poll at least 1% in three national polls at least six weeks before a debate. Lessig said that "unless we can time travel, there is no way that I can qualify." He then announced the suspension of his campaign.

=== Dates with low expected ratings ===
The campaigns of both Bernie Sanders and Martin O'Malley criticized the days and times for the debates, as well as stating that more of them were needed. Of the nine debates, two took place on a Saturday, two on Sunday, three on a Thursday, one on a Tuesday and one on a Wednesday. The choice of Saturday was criticised because it generally has lower television viewership according to Nielsen ratings, with only Friday nights having lower ratings. While the first Democratic debate took place on a Tuesday night and drew 15.3 million viewers, the second Democratic debate took place on a Saturday night and drew only about 8.5 million viewers. The third Democratic debate also took place on a Saturday night, and drew slightly lower but comparable ratings to the second debate. In the event, the Saturday night debates were the third- and fifth-most watched debates.

One of the Saturday night debates took place the Saturday before Christmas, and another took place on Sunday night of Martin Luther King Day weekend, a scheduling that Vox.com says is also expected to make for poor ratings.

Democratic National Committee (DNC) chair Debbie Wasserman Schultz has denied claims that the DNC wants to protect frontrunner Hillary Clinton by picking dates that will receive poor viewership.

== See also ==
- 2016 Democratic Party presidential primaries
- 2016 Democratic Party presidential candidates
- 2016 Republican Party presidential debates and forums
- 2016 Green Party presidential debates and forums
- 2016 Libertarian Party presidential debates and forums
- 2016 United States presidential debates
- 2004 Democratic Party presidential debates and forums
- 2008 Democratic Party presidential debates and forums
- 2020 Democratic Party presidential debates and forums
