= Left, Right & Center =

Political radio program and podcast

- Genre: Talk show
- Running time: Circa 60 minutes
- Country of origin: United States
- Language: English
- Home station: KCRW
- Syndicates: KCRW
- Hosted by: David Greene
- Recording studio: Santa Monica, California
- Original release: April 1996 – present
- Audio format: Stereophonic
- Website: www.kcrw.com/news/shows/left-right-center

Left, Right & Center is a weekly hour-long public radio program. Debuting in April, 1996, the program is also distributed as a political podcast. The show is recorded each Friday, produced by KCRW in Santa Monica, California, by Laura Dine Million.

After covering the week's events and speaking to invited guests about other topics of interest, each host gets a short period of time to rant or rave about whatever they like without fear of rebuttal.

== Co-hosts and guests ==
The show's regular co-hosts are the following:

- David Greene, co-founder of Fearless Media, has been host and moderator since 2022, replacing former host Josh Barro, columnist at New York magazine. and Matthew Miller, senior fellow at the Center for American Progress.
- Mo Elleithee, an American political campaign strategist and Executive Director at Georgetown University's Institute of Politics and Public Service, represents the political left. Previous co-hosts include Elizabeth Bruenig and Robert Scheer.
- Sarah Isgur, representing the political right, is an American attorney, political commentator and former spokesperson in the United States Department of Justice in the first Trump administration. Previous co-hosts representing the right include Arianna Huffington, David Frum, Rich Lowry, and Tony Blankley,
