= 2016 Green Party presidential debates and forums =

A series of political debates were held between the Green candidates for president in the 2016 United States presidential election.

== Presidential debates ==
=== July 24, 2015 - Green Party Annual National Meeting ===
On July 24, 2016, the Green Party had its first presidential candidate forum for the 2016 election cycle, taking place in St. Louis, Missouri. The five leading Green candidates were present in the debate: Former Lexington Town Meeting Member and 2012 Green Party Presidential Nominee Jill Stein, Distinguished Professor Emeritus of the University of South Carolina William Kreml, People's National Convention organizer Sedinam Kinamo Christin Moyowasifza Curry, San Diego County Air Pollution Control Inspector Kent Mesplay, and Earth First! organizer Darryl Cherney. On the following day, the candidates participated in a Black Lives Matter rally in Ferguson.

=== January 23, 2016 - Green Candidate Forum (cancelled) ===
In conjunction with the General Assembly of the Green Party of California, the planned San Diego debate was cancelled supposedly due to a candidate exclusion dispute. In addition to the Green Party of California, the national Green Party Presidential Campaign Support Committee was also to host the livestreamed forum.

=== May 9, 2016 - RT America ===
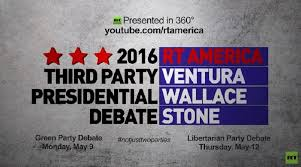

On May 9, a televised Green debate was hosted by RT America. It was the only live televised presidential debate for the Green Party. Not in attendance were William Kreml and Darryl Cherney. Instead, Jill Stein, Kent Mesplay and Sedinam Kinamo Christin Moyowasifza Curry appeared in the event. The debate was moderated by Tyrel Ventura (son of former Minnesota Governor Jesse Ventura) and Tabetha Wallace. RT America also hosted a televised debate for the Libertarian Party three days later.

== Post convention town hall forums and debates ==
=== August 17, 2016 - CNN ===
CNN hosted a Green Party town hall on August 17, 2016. Green nominee Jill Stein and her running mate Ajamu Baraka appeared in the event, facilitated by CNN's Chris Cuomo.

=== September 19, 2016 - Fusion TV ===
Fusion TV hosted a presidential Green Party forum on September 19, 2016. Green nominee Jill Stein and her running mate Ajamu Baraka appeared in the event, facilitated by Fusion TV's Jorge Ramos and Alicia Menendez.

=== September 23, 2016 - FOX Business ===
Fox Business Network hosted a Green Party town hall on September 23, 2016. Green nominee Jill Stein appeared solo in the event, facilitated by FOX Business' John Stossel.

=== October 11, 2016 - C-SPAN ===
C-SPAN hosted a Green Party town hall on October 11, 2016. Green nominee Jill Stein and her running mate Ajamu Baraka appeared in the event, facilitated by C-SPAN's Steve Scully.

=== October 31, 2016 - PBS ===
PBS hosted a debate on October 31, 2016, between Green nominee Jill Stein and Libertarian nominee Gary Johnson. The event took place on The Tavis Smiley Show with Tavis Smiley as the moderator for the 3 part production.

== See also ==
- Green Party presidential primaries, 2016
- Republican Party presidential debates and forums, 2016
- Democratic Party presidential debates and forums, 2016
- Libertarian Party presidential debates and forums, 2016
