= FWHS =

FWHS may refer to:

- Fairfield Warde High School, Fairfield, Connecticut, United States
- Federal Way High School, Federal Way, Washington, United States
- Flowing Wells High School, Tucson, Arizona, United States
