= Flowing Wells, Arizona =

CDP in Pima County, Arizona

- CDP
- Location in Pima County and the state of Arizona

- Location in the United States
- Coordinates: 32°17′29″N 111°0′32″W
- Country: United States
- State: Arizona
- County: Pima

Area
  - Total: 3.81 sq mi (9.87 km^{2})
  - Land: 3.81 sq mi (9.87 km^{2})
  - Water: 0 sq mi (0.00 km^{2})
- Elevation: 2,270 ft (692 m)

Population (2020)
  - Total: 15,657
  - Density: 4,110.3/sq mi (1,586.98/km^{2})
- Time zone: UTC-7 (MST (no DST))
- Area code: 520
- FIPS code: 04-23960
- GNIS feature ID: 1866983

Flowing Wells is a census-designated place (CDP) in Pima County, Arizona, United States. It is a suburb of Tucson. The population was 16,419 at the 2010 census.

The Flowing Wells community was given an All-America City Award by the National Civic League in 2007.

== Geography ==
Flowing Wells is located at 32°17′29″N 111°0′32″W (32.291305, -111.008859).

According to the United States Census Bureau, the CDP has a total area of 3.4 square miles (8.8 km^{2}), all land.

Flowing Wells is roughly bound by Interstate 10 to the West, the Rillito River to the North, and the City of Tucson to the South and East.

It is entirely within Arizona's 2nd congressional district, on the western side of the district. Additionally, it is within Arizona's 9th legislative district and primarily within Pima County's 3rd supervisor district, though the northern portion of the CDP is within the 1st supervisor district.

== Demographics ==
Historical population
| Census | Pop. | Note | %± |
|---|---|---|---|
| 1990 | 14,013 | | — |
| 2000 | 15,050 | | 7.4% |
| 2010 | 16,419 | | 9.1% |
| 2020 | 15,657 | | −4.6% |

=== 2020 census ===
As of the 2020 census, Flowing Wells had a population of 15,657. There were 6,463 households and 3,849 families residing in the CDP. The median age was 40.0 years. 22.0% of residents were under the age of 18 and 18.3% of residents were 65 years of age or older. For every 100 females there were 94.9 males, and for every 100 females age 18 and over there were 93.4 males age 18 and over.

100.0% of residents lived in urban areas, while 0.0% lived in rural areas.

Of households in Flowing Wells, 26.7% had children under the age of 18 living in them. Of all households, 34.1% were married-couple households, 23.7% were households with a male householder and no spouse or partner present, and 33.3% were households with a female householder and no spouse or partner present. About 33.3% of all households were made up of individuals and 15.9% had someone living alone who was 65 years of age or older.

There were 7,129 housing units, of which 9.3% were vacant. The homeowner vacancy rate was 2.5% and the rental vacancy rate was 7.4%.

Racial composition as of the 2020 census
| Race | Number | Percent |
|---|---|---|
| White | 9,349 | 59.7% |
| Black or African American | 255 | 1.6% |
| American Indian and Alaska Native | 333 | 2.1% |
| Asian | 330 | 2.1% |
| Native Hawaiian and Other Pacific Islander | 13 | 0.1% |
| Some other race | 2,498 | 16.0% |
| Two or more races | 2,879 | 18.4% |
| Hispanic or Latino (of any race) | 7,001 | 44.7% |

=== 2010 census ===
In 2010 Flowing Wells had a population of 16,419. The racial and ethnic composition of the population was 58.2% non-Hispanic white, 1.7% African American, 2.0% Native American, 1.2% Asian, 0.1% Pacific Islander, 0.1% non-Hispanic of some other race, 3.7% two or more races and 36.3% Hispanic or Latino.

=== Income and poverty ===
The median income for a household in the CDP was $37,092, and the median income for a family was $31,786. Males had a median income of $26,235 versus $21,972 for females. The per capita income for the CDP was $14,833. About 15.2% of families and 17.1% of the population were below the poverty line, including 24.2% of those under age 18 and 9.8% of those age 65 or over.

== Public safety ==
Law enforcement services are provided by the Foothills District of the Pima County Sheriff's Department with the portion of the CDP lying west of La Cholla Boulevard served by Beat 4 and the portion lying east of La Cholla Boulevard served by Beat 3. Fire protection and paramedic services are provided by the Northwest Fire District.

== Economy ==
=== Primary and secondary schools ===
Flowing Wells Unified School District operates public schools in Flowing Wells and serves much of Flowing Wells (the extreme eastern part of the census-designated place is served by Amphitheater Public Schools).

Flowing Wells USD schools: Emily Meschter Early Learning Center is located in Flowing Wells. District elementary schools in Flowing Wells include Centennial Elementary School, Homer Davis Elementary School, and Laguna Elementary School. Flowing Wells Junior High School is located in Flowing Wells.

=== Public libraries ===
Pima County Public Library operates the Flowing Wells Branch Library.

=== Water ===
The Flowing Wells Irrigation District, an independent public water provider founded in 1922, provides water for the southern majority portion of the CDP.

== See also ==
- Flowing Wells Witch Trial
