= 2016 Republican Party presidential debates and forums =

Twelve presidential debates and nine forums were held between the candidates for the Republican Party's nomination for president in the 2016 United States presidential election, starting on August 6, 2015.

== Presidential debates ==
=== Schedule ===
The Republican National Committee announced the 2015–2016 debate schedule on January 16, 2015. It revealed that 12 debates would be held, in contrast to the 20 debates that were held from 2011 to 2012. The announcement included which news organizations would host each debate, with Fox News and CNN having three each; and one each for ABC, CBS, NBC, CNBC, Fox Business Network, and a conservative media outlet to be announced. It had some changes during the primary.

The first live-broadcast debate occurred on Thursday, August 6, 2015, at the Quicken Loans Arena in Cleveland, Ohio. It was seen on the Fox News Channel by 24 million viewers, making the debate the most watched live broadcast for a non-sporting event in cable television history. Due to the number of candidates running for nomination, Fox News aired two separate debates on August 6, with the less popular candidates going first, followed by the candidates with more support in the 'prime time' debate.

One debate per month followed through December 2015. The GOP candidates debated twice in January and three times in February 2016. On February 20, 2016, the RNC announced a thirteenth debate, which was to be held in Salt Lake City, Utah, on Monday, March 21. This would have made for three debates in March, but the event was later canceled due to all but one of the candidates opting not to attend.

The following table lists the twelve RNC debates which took place, along with the dates, times, places, hosts, and participants.

Debates among candidates for the 2016 Republican Party U.S. presidential nomination
No.	Date	Time	Place	Host	Participants^{*}																
P Participant, main debate. S Participant, secondary debate. I Invitee, main debate. N Non-invitee. A Absent invitee, main debate. AS Absent invitee, secondary debate. O Out of race (withdrawn).					Bush	Carson	Christie	Cruz	Fiorina	Gilmore	Graham	Huckabee	Jindal	Kasich	Pataki	Paul	Perry	Rubio	Santorum	Trump	Walker
RNC sanctioned debates
1	August 6, 2015	5 p.m. EDT; 9 p.m. EDT	Quicken Loans Arena; Cleveland, OH	Fox News/ Facebook	P	P	P	P	S	S	S	P	S	P	S	P	S	P	S	P	P
2	September 16, 2015	3 p.m. PDT; 5 p.m. PDT	Reagan Library; Simi Valley, CA	CNN/ Salem Radio	P	P	P	P	P	N	S	P	S	P	S	P	O	P	S	P	P
3	October 28, 2015	4 p.m. MDT; 6 p.m. MDT	Coors Events Ctr. Boulder, CO	CNBC/ Westwood One	P	P	P	P	P	N	S	P	S	P	S	P	O	P	S	P	O
4	November 10, 2015	6 p.m. CST; 8 p.m. CST	Milwaukee Theatre; Milwaukee, WI	Fox Business/ WSJ	P	P	S	P	P	N	N	S	S	P	N	P	O	P	S	P	O
5	December 15, 2015	3 p.m. PST; 5:30 p.m. PST	The Venetian; Las Vegas, NV	CNN/ Salem Radio	P	P	P	P	P	N	S	S	O	P	S	P	O	P	S	P	O
6	January 14, 2016	6 p.m. EST; 9 p.m. EST	N. Charleston Coliseum; N. Charleston, SC	Fox Business/ Facebook	P	P	P	P	S	N	O	S	O	P	O	AS	O	P	S	P	O
7	January 28, 2016	6 p.m. CST; 8 p.m. CST	Iowa Events Center; Des Moines, IA	Fox News/ Google	P	P	P	P	S	S	O	S	O	P	O	P	O	P	S	A	O
8	February 6, 2016	8 p.m. EST	St. Anselm College; Goffstown, NH	ABC News/ IJReview.com	P	P	P	P	N	N	O	O	O	P	O	O	O	P	O	P	O
9	February 13, 2016	9 p.m. EST	Peace Center; Greenville, SC	CBS News	P	P	O	P	O	O	O	O	O	P	O	O	O	P	O	P	O
10	February 25, 2016	7 p.m. CST	University of Houston; Houston, TX	CNN/Salem; Radio/Telemundo	O	P	O	P	O	O	O	O	O	P	O	O	O	P	O	P	O
11	March 3, 2016	9 p.m. EST	Fox Theatre; Detroit, MI	Fox News	O	O	O	P	O	O	O	O	O	P	O	O	O	P	O	P	O
12	March 10, 2016	9 p.m. EST	University of Miami; BankUnited Center; Coral Gables, FL	CNN/Salem Radio/ Washington Times	O	O	O	P	O	O	O	O	O	P	O	O	O	P	O	P	O
_{*}Participating in at least one debate listed above: Former Gov. Jeb Bush of Florida • Neurosurgeon Ben Carson of Maryland • Gov. Chris Christie of New Jersey • Sen. Ted Cruz of Texas • Businesswoman Carly Fiorina of California • Former Gov. Jim Gilmore of Virginia • Sen. Lindsey Graham of South Carolina • Former Gov. Mike Huckabee of Arkansas • Gov. Bobby Jindal of Louisiana • Gov. John Kasich of Ohio • Former Gov. George Pataki of New York • Sen. Rand Paul of Kentucky • Former Gov. Rick Perry of Texas • Sen. Marco Rubio of Florida • Former Sen. Rick Santorum of Pennsylvania • Businessman Donald Trump of New York • Gov. Scott Walker of Wisconsin

=== Polling effect ===
The use of polling data had initially been criticized by polling firms such as highly regarded Marist. Prior to the first debate, Marist decided to temporarily suspend its national polling of preferences for the Republican nominee on the basis that using non-scientific polling data to select the bipartisan debate field puts polling firms such as Marist under pressure to produce high-precision results that are inherently impossible to provide at that point in time.

For instance, it would be difficult to determine the margin of error in any statistical sampling process like a preference poll (see statistical tie for tenth place, and more generally the independence of clones).

FiveThirtyEight made the point of the varying degrees of discretion the television networks gave themselves with their distinct debate invitation criteria, noting that polling data can only be seen as an objective method for selection of the debate participants, if the full and exact criteria are made clear in advance. The rhetoric about the pros and cons of the debate criteria, and the use of polls to winnow the field, partially displaced more substantive discussions of concrete policies that candidates are proposing.

In terms of many GOP candidates, the use of polls to winnow the field was criticized, especially by candidates with relatively low-polling numbers in August, including Rick Santorum and Lindsey Graham, who both said through the media that their exclusion from the main debates could prevent them from being competitive in the primaries and caucuses.

Candidates ranked from 8th to 12th place in the polls prior to the August 2015 debate, which included Chris Christie, Rick Perry, and John Kasich, downplayed the importance of being invited to any specific debate by emphasizing that delegate selection in early states is more important. Christie and fellow one-time candidate Rand Paul both had made the point that the early debates would give candidates a chance to communicate policy ideas to voters, and would subsequently be helpful in giving voters the information needed to decide which candidate to support.

Some in the media questioned Donald Trump's seriousness as a candidate, and pondered as to whether or not he should be included in the debates. Trump filed FEC paperwork to make his run official; however, despite doing well in the early polling which effectively guaranteed him an invitation to the Fox News and CNN debates, Trump expressed ambivalence about the value of the debates to his own campaign (saying he was not a debater and therefore did not know how well he would perform in one), and to the process in general (saying that politicians are always debating with little in the way of results).

=== Logistics ===
With as many as 17 major candidates vying for the nomination, the prospect of including all the candidates in a debate presented logistical difficulties. For each of the debates held from August 2015 through January 2016, the sponsoring television network conducted both a debate broadcast in prime time preceded by another debate in the afternoon or early evening; the candidates who ranked higher in the polls were invited to the prime time debate, with lower-ranking candidates admitted to the earlier debate only. The earlier debates for the lower-ranked candidates were nicknamed the "undercard" debates or the "kids' table" debates.

=== Ratings ===
The following table lists the ratings (number of estimated viewers) of the debates to date.

Debate	Channel	Date	Viewers
1	FNC	August 6, 2015	24 million
2	CNN	September 16, 2015	23 million
3	CNBC	October 28, 2015	14 million
4	FBN	November 10, 2015	13.5 million
5	CNN	December 15, 2015	18 million
6	FBN	January 14, 2016	11.1 million
7	FNC	January 28, 2016	12.5 million
8	ABC	February 6, 2016	13.2 million
9	CBS	February 13, 2016	13.5 million
10	CNN	February 25, 2016	14.5 million
11	FNC	March 3, 2016	16.9 million
12	CNN	March 10, 2016	11.9 million

Sites of the 2016 Republican primary debates.

=== August 6, 2015 – Cleveland, Ohio ===
The first debate was hosted by Fox News Channel, Facebook, and the Ohio Republican Party at the Quicken Loans Arena in Cleveland, Ohio – the same location as the future 2016 Republican National Convention. The two-hour debate invited the 10 highest-polling candidates, as measured by the average of the top five national polls selected by Fox. In addition, all other candidates who were "consistently being offered" as choices in national polls were invited to a one-hour debate earlier that same day. (Originally, the non-primetime debate had a minimum requirement that invitees were averaging at least 1% in Fox-recognized national polls, and was to be aired at noon for a total of two hours in duration.) The two-tiered debate hosted by Fox News on the 6th was qualitatively different from the C-SPAN forum held on the 3rd, for at least three reasons: it was a debate rather than a forum, where candidates were allowed to challenge each other, not just speak one at a time sequentially; it was divided into two tiers based on national polling numbers, only a subset of the candidates were on-stage (during each of the two distinct Fox News airtimes); and finally, Donald Trump and Mike Huckabee were participants in the primetime tier, but did not appear at the C-SPAN forum.

The candidates in the main debate were Donald Trump, Jeb Bush, Scott Walker, Mike Huckabee, Ben Carson, Ted Cruz, Marco Rubio, Rand Paul, Chris Christie, and John Kasich. The moderators were Bret Baier, Megyn Kelly, and Chris Wallace. Seven candidates who did not qualify were invited to participate in the 5 p.m. forum; these were Rick Perry, Bobby Jindal, Rick Santorum, Lindsey Graham, Carly Fiorina, Jim Gilmore, and George Pataki; the moderators for this debate were Bill Hemmer and Martha McCallum. Because of a rule-change announced by FOX one week before the debate-invitations went out, Graham, Pataki, and Gilmore were allowed to participate at 5 p.m. despite averaging below 1% in the five selected polls. (Former IRS Commissioner Mark Everson was excluded from the 5 p.m. tier, along with other relatively unknown candidates who did not meet the updated invitation-criteria of "consistently being offered to respondents in major national polls as recognized by Fox News.") The five selected polls were conducted by Fox News, Bloomberg, CBS News, Monmouth University, and Quinnipiac University.

In the main event, Trump was afforded the most time to speak at the debate by the Fox moderators (at 10 minutes, 32 seconds) followed by Bush (8:31), Huckabee (6:40), Cruz (6:39), Kasich (6:31), Carson (6:23), Rubio (6:22), Christie (6:10), Walker (5:51), and Paul (5:10). The debate itself was viewed by 24 million people at its peak, setting records for the most-watched presidential primary debate ever and the highest-rated non-sports telecast in cable television history.

The two different debates received rather different analyses in terms of the performances of the candidates. In the lower tier debate with only 7 candidates, Carly Fiorina was overwhelmingly considered the best debater, while Perry and Jindal were also praised, and Gilmore, Graham, Pataki, and Santorum were criticized. In the primetime debate, frontrunner Donald Trump's overall performance was criticized as rude and erratic by many pundits, while others said his comments were popular and his criticisms were overdue, including his criticism of Bush's description of illegal immigration as an "act of love." Cruz, Rubio, Christie, and Huckabee received praise. Notable conflicts between candidates included Rand Paul vs. Christie over the NSA surveillance program, Paul vs. Trump on the latter's possible third-party run, Paul vs. Trump on healthcare, and Christie vs. Huckabee on the issue of welfare reform. Trump also clashed with two of the moderators – Kelly and Wallace – on the issue of sexism with Kelly, and the issue of illegal immigration with Wallace (specifically, Trump's false claims that the Mexican government was deliberately sending criminals into America illegally).

The lower tier debate was the first and only debate appearance of former Texas governor Rick Perry, who dropped out of the race less than a month later, after he failed to qualify for the second primetime debate and said that this was damaging to his fundraising abilities.

=== September 16, 2015 – Simi Valley, California ===
The second debate took place at (and was co-sponsored by) the Ronald Reagan Presidential Library, which previously hosted two of the Republican debates in 2008 – the first and penultimate ones. This 2015 debate was aired on CNN, and simulcast on the Salem Radio Network. Similar to the Fox News-sponsored debate in Cleveland, but with slightly different ranking-criteria, the debate was split into primetime and pre-primetime groups based on averaged polling numbers. The primetime debate was originally planned to include the candidates ranking in the top ten, as measured by nationwide polling performed by specific firms, averaged across polls that are released between July 16 and September 10; the rules were later changed to allow candidates placing in the top ten in polls from August 7 through September 10 to qualify as well. This change was made due to an unexpected scarcity of polls taken after the August 6 debate, which would otherwise have been particularly disadvantageous to Carly Fiorina, who had significantly increased her support in polls taken after that debate but who would otherwise have been kept out of the primetime debate due to her minimal support in the large number of polls taken before the August 6 debate.

Eleven candidates participated in the prime time debate: Jeb Bush, Ben Carson, Chris Christie, Ted Cruz, Carly Fiorina, Mike Huckabee, John Kasich, Rand Paul, Marco Rubio, Donald Trump, and Scott Walker. The candidates in the undercard debate were Bobby Jindal, Lindsey Graham, Rick Santorum, and George Pataki. Rick Perry had been invited to the undercard debate but suspended his campaign on September 11, effectively ending his candidacy. Former governor Jim Gilmore did not qualify for either debate.

The undercard broadcast took place at 3 pm PDT, while the main card broadcast took place at 5 pm PDT. The two-tiered CNN broadcasts were consecutive, with the primetime debate immediately following the second-tier broadcast. The moderator was Jake Tapper of CNN, with participation by Hugh Hewitt and Dana Bash. The primetime debate, like the first on Fox News, was a massive ratings success with nearly 23 million viewers, roughly 1 million less than the previous debate, and setting the record for the highest-rated broadcast in CNN's history.

The primary focus of the debate was on Carly Fiorina, the one and only candidate who rose from the "undercard" tier of the previous debate into the primetime debate this time around. After the debate, most analysts believed that she successfully solidified her newfound status as a top-tier candidate, and successfully defended herself against attacks by Donald Trump. Marco Rubio was also largely viewed as the other strong performer of the night, and both Fiorina's and Rubio's poll numbers began to increase significantly in the wake of this debate. Additional candidates who received praise included Mike Huckabee and Chris Christie, while frontrunner Donald Trump, former Florida governor Jeb Bush, and Ohio governor John Kasich were largely criticized. Notable exchanges in the debate were Trump vs Fiorina on the former's comments about her face and on each other's business records, Trump vs Paul on the former's insults, Trump vs Bush on immigration, Trump vs Bush on casino gambling in Florida, women's health issues, and foreign policy, as well as Christie and Bush against Paul on marijuana legalization. This was the second and final debate appearance by Wisconsin governor Scott Walker, who dropped out of the race five days later, saying that the subsequent decrease of his own poll numbers and fundraising were largely due to his two debate performances being largely panned by commentators.

During the less formal section of the debate the candidates were asked what secret service nicknames they'd choose were they to become President of the United States. The candidates answered as follows; Jeb Bush: Eveready (a reference to Donald Trump's earlier "low-energy" criticism), Ben Carson: One Nation, Chris Christie: True Heart, Ted Cruz: Cohiba, Carly Fiorina: Secretariat, Mike Huckabee: Duck Hunter, John Kasich: Unit 2 (his wife is Unit 1), Rand Paul: Justice Never Sleeps (Tapper suggest it might be a mouthful), Marco Rubio: Gator, Donald Trump: Humble, and Scott Walker: Harley.

=== October 28, 2015 – Boulder, Colorado ===
The third debate was held on October 28 at the University of Colorado in Boulder, which is also one of the sponsors. CNBC stated that the debate would focus on the economy. The moderators were announced as John Harwood, Carl Quintanilla, and Becky Quick, with additional questions to be asked by Rick Santelli, Sharon Epperson, and Jim Cramer.

On September 30, CNBC announced that all candidates with an average of 2.5% or better in polls conducted by NBC, Fox, CNN, ABC, CBS, and Bloomberg released in the five weeks (from September 17 through October 21 inclusive) before the October 28 debate would be invited to participate in the primetime debate at 8 p.m. EDT. All other candidates receiving at least 1% in any one of the polls conducted by the six recognized firms would be invited to the undercard debate at 6 p.m. EDT.

In response to the previous debate on CNN running over three hours in length, the top two highest-polling candidates – Donald Trump and Ben Carson – teamed up in a threatened boycott of the CNBC debate. They demanded that the debate be limited to no longer than two hours, and also that opening and closing statements be included in those two hours; otherwise, if these conditions were not met, both Trump and Carson would withdraw from the debate. On October 16, CNBC announced that it had accepted the demands of Trump and Carson, setting the two-hour maximum and allowing for opening and closing statements.

On October 21, CNBC announced that 10 candidates (Bush, Carson, Christie, Cruz, Fiorina, Huckabee, Kasich, Paul, Rubio and Trump) would take the stage shortly after 8 p.m. EDT, with four candidates (Graham, Jindal, Santorum, and Pataki) on stage about two hours earlier. Whether Jindal would participate was unclear; he said on October 20 that he might skip the debate if the criteria for the main group was not changed. On October 27, Jindal's press secretary said he would participate: "We just thought about it and he's always been ready to debate at any time."

The primetime debate featured numerous clashes between the candidates and the moderators, and the moderators were criticized – both by the candidates and by commentators in the aftermath – for perceived rudeness towards the candidates, asking questions that were perceived as biased. Cruz, Rubio, Christie, Huckabee, Trump, and Carson all criticized the moderators at some point or another, and often received the loudest applause as a result. The CNBC moderators were also criticized by some news outlets, such as The Daily Beast, with Bill Maher, Byron York, and Stuart Rothenberg also criticizing the moderators. Other news sources have come out in support of CNBC's vigorous vetting of the candidates, such as The Guardian. At Salon, Huffington Post Senior Media Editor Jack Mirkinson described CNBC's handling of the debate as "catastrophic", while feminist blogger and former John Edwards Campaign Blogmaster Amanda Marcotte described the questions as "substantive".

Many commentators considered the winners of the primetime debate to be Rubio, Cruz, and Christie, primarily for their attacks on the debate's moderator's questions. The two front-runners in the polls at the time, Trump and Carson, did not receive as much focus nor had as many memorable moments, but were still viewed as doing fairly well. Bush and Kasich were largely criticized for their performances, particularly when the former argued with Rubio over Rubio's attendance record as a Senator, and when the latter clashed with Trump over Kasich's record as governor, and his sudden shift in debate strategy from passive to aggressive, which Trump said was simply being done in response to his falling poll numbers.

On October 30, 2015, the RNC announced that NBC News would no longer host the February 26, 2016, debate in Houston. RNC chairman Reince Priebus showed concerns that an NBC-hosted debate could result in a "repeat" of the CNBC debate, as both are divisions of NBCUniversal, although NBC News is editorially separate from CNBC. Priebus explained that CNBC had conducted the October 28 debate in "bad faith", arguing that "while debates are meant to include tough questions and contrast candidates' visions and policies for the future of America, CNBC's moderators engaged in a series of 'gotcha' questions, petty and mean-spirited in tone, and designed to embarrass our candidates. What took place Wednesday night was not an attempt to give the American people a greater understanding of our candidates' policies and ideas."

As for the venue, Marco Rubio and Donald Trump complained about the heat in the arena made their sweating visible to the viewers. The Republicans then drafted a list of demands including "The temperature in the auditorium must be below 67°F (19°C)."

=== November 10, 2015 – Milwaukee, Wisconsin ===
The fourth debate was held on November 10, 2015, at the Milwaukee Theatre in Milwaukee, Wisconsin, airing on the Fox Business Network and sponsored by The Wall Street Journal. This debate focused on jobs, taxes, and the general health of the U.S. economy, as well as on domestic and international policy issues. The moderators were Neil Cavuto, Maria Bartiromo and Gerard Baker.

To participate in the main debate, a candidate needed to have an average of at least 2.5% in the four most recent recognized national polls conducted through November 4. Candidates who failed to reach that average but who scored at least 1% in any of those four polls were invited to the secondary debate, which was moderated by Sandra Smith, Trish Regan, and The Wall Street Journal′s Washington bureau chief, Gerald Seib.

The official debate lineup was unveiled on November 5. This lineup noticeably differed from previous lineups in several significant ways: For the first time in the debate season, there were fewer than ten candidates in the primetime lineup; that consists of eight candidates: Trump, Carson, Rubio, Cruz, Bush, Fiorina, Kasich, and Paul. Also, over half of the original set of lower-tier candidates polling less than 1% were excluded from the undercard debate due to failing to reach at least 1% in some polls, those being Graham, Pataki, and Gilmore. Thus, the lower-tier debate lineup instead featured Christie and Huckabee – both removed from the main stage for the first time – alongside previous lower-tier candidates Santorum and Jindal. Notable exchanges included Trump vs Kasich and Bush on immigration, Trump vs Bush on foreign policy, Fiorina vs Paul on Russia, and Rubio vs Paul on the formers tax plan as well as military spending. Cruz and Kasich also had an exchange on whether they would bail out the banks.

The undercard debate was the fourth and final debate appearance of Governor Bobby Jindal, who ended his campaign on November 17, stating "this is not my time."

=== December 15, 2015 – Las Vegas, Nevada ===
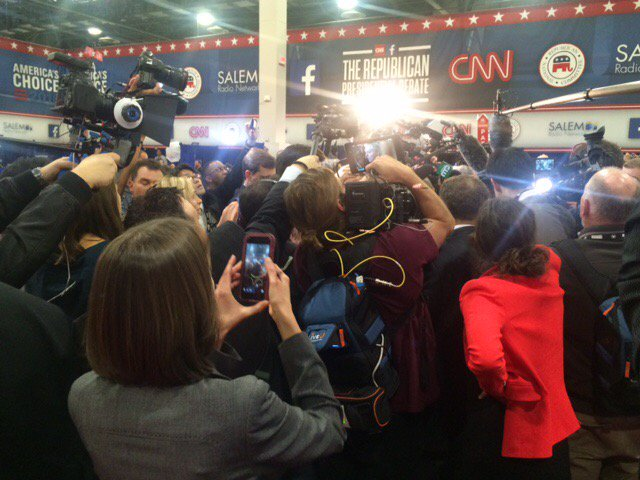
Spin room at the Las Vegas debate

The fifth debate was held on December 15, 2015, at the Venetian Resort in Las Vegas, Nevada. It was the second debate to air on CNN, and was also broadcast by Salem Radio. The debate was moderated solely by Wolf Blitzer with Dana Bash and Hugh Hewitt serving alongside as questioners.

The debate was split into primetime and pre-primetime groups based on averaged polling numbers; in order to participate in the main debate, candidates had to meet one of three criteria in polls conducted between October 29 and December 13 which were recognized by CNN—either an average of at least 3.5% nationally, or at least 4% in either Iowa or New Hampshire. The secondary debate featured candidates that had reached at least 1% in four separate national, Iowa, or New Hampshire polls that are recognized by CNN. Paul was included in the main debate after not qualifying under the original rules because he received 5% support in Iowa in a Fox News poll.

The debate lineup was announced on December 13 to include Trump, Cruz, Rubio, Carson, Bush, Fiorina, Christie, Paul, and Kasich in the primetime debate, and Huckabee, Santorum, Graham, and Pataki in the undercard debate. Commentators suggested that the key confrontation would be between Trump and Cruz, based on their respective polling in Iowa.

Eighteen million people watched the debate, making it the third-largest audience ever for a presidential primary debate. During the debate, the audible coughing was attributed to Ben Carson. His campaign admitted that they all got sick a month prior and Carson had kept the cough for weeks. The cough was "almost gone" and Carson was not really sick at the time. Notable exchanges included Trump vs Bush on foreign policy as well as the formers proposed Muslim ban, Paul vs Rubio on the NSA and immigration, as well as Cruz vs Rubio on the NSA metadata program, foreign policy, and immigration.

The undercard debate was the fourth and final debate appearance of Senator Lindsey Graham and former Governor George Pataki, who suspended their campaigns on December 21 and December 29, respectively.

=== January 14, 2016 – North Charleston, South Carolina ===
On December 8, 2015, it was announced that Fox Business Network would host an additional debate two days after the State of the Union address. The debate was held in the North Charleston Coliseum in North Charleston, South Carolina. The anchor and managing editor of Business News, Neil Cavuto, and anchor and global markets editor, Maria Bartiromo, repeated their roles as moderators for the prime-time debate, which began at 9 p.m. EST. The earlier debate, which started at 6 p.m. EST, was again moderated by anchors Trish Regan and Sandra Smith.

On December 22, 2015, Fox Business Network announced that in order to qualify for the prime-time debate, candidates would have to either place in the top six nationally (based on an average of the five most recent national polls recognized by FOX News), place in the top five in Iowa (based on an average of the five most recent Iowa state polls recognized by FOX News), or place in the top five in New Hampshire (based on an average of the five most recent New Hampshire state polls recognized by FOX News). In order to qualify for the first debate, candidates must have registered at least 1% in one of the five most recent national polls.

Seven candidates were revealed to have been invited to the prime-time debate on January 11, 2016, namely Jeb Bush, Ben Carson, Chris Christie, Ted Cruz, John Kasich, Marco Rubio, and Donald Trump. At the debate, participants were introduced in order of their poll rankings.

Carly Fiorina, Mike Huckabee, and Rick Santorum participated in the undercard debate. Rand Paul was invited, but said, "I won't participate in anything that's not first tier because we have a first tier campaign." Noteworthy exchanges included Rubio versus Christie on the latter's record, Trump versus Cruz on Cruz's eligibility and "New York Values", Trump vs Bush and Rubio on trade with China and versus Rubio on the former's tax plan as well as illegal immigration records.

=== January 28, 2016 – Des Moines, Iowa ===
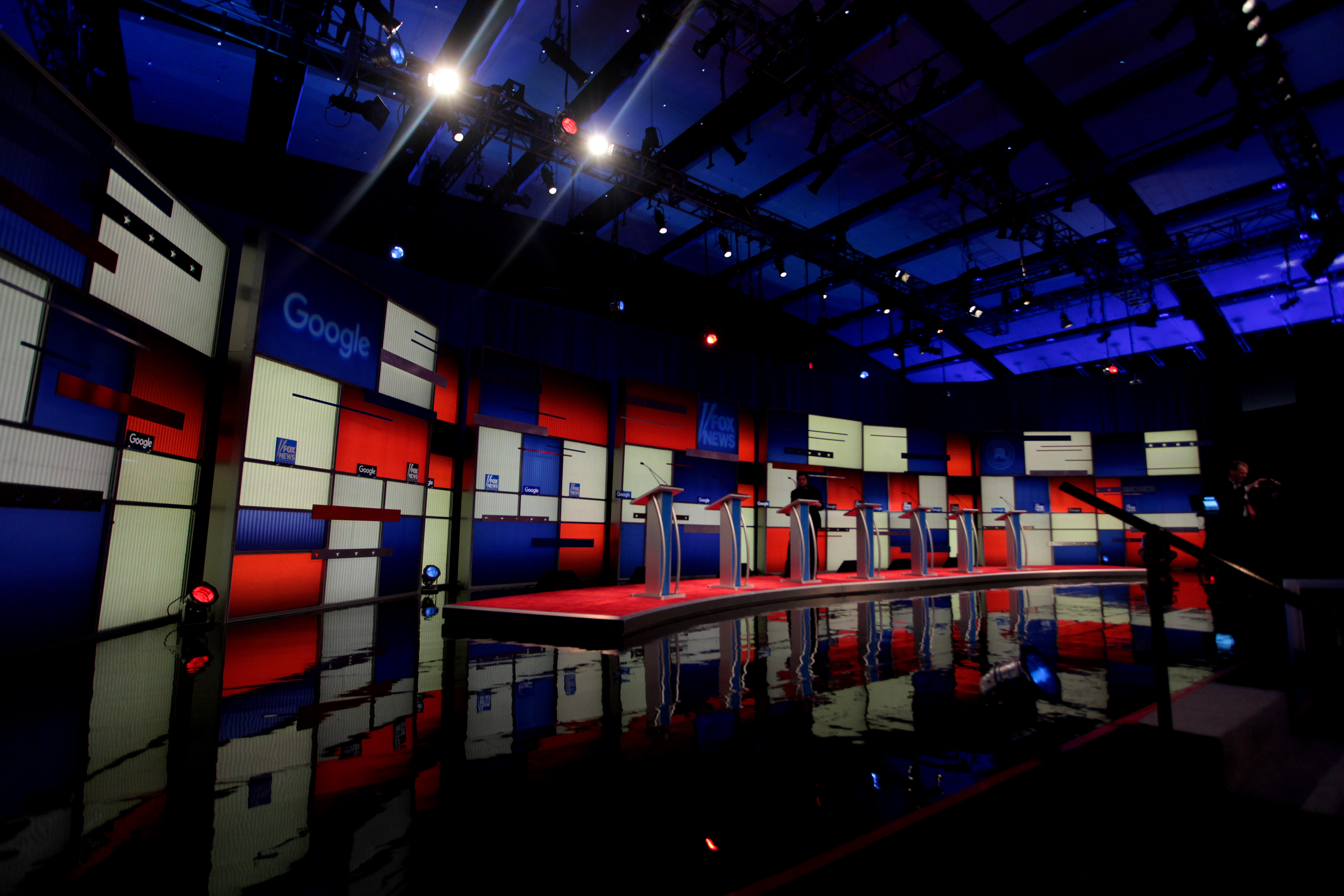
Republican Party debate stage, Des Moines, Iowa, January 2016

The seventh debate was held in Iowa, which holds the first caucuses, and was the second debate to air on Fox News Channel. As in Fox's first debate, the moderators were Bret Baier, Megyn Kelly, and Chris Wallace. It was the last debate before actual voting began with the Iowa caucuses on February 1, 2016.

The debate was, again, divided into undercard and primetime rounds; to qualify for the primetime debate, candidates must have, in polls recognized by FNC, either placed in the top six nationally based on an average of the five most recent national polls; place in the top five in Iowa, based on an average of the five most recent Iowa state polls, or place in the top five in New Hampshire, based on an average of the five most recent New Hampshire state polls. In order to qualify for the first debate, candidates must have registered at least one percent in one of the five most recent national polls.

On January 26, 2016, Jeb Bush, Ben Carson, Chris Christie, Ted Cruz, John Kasich, Rand Paul, Marco Rubio, and Donald Trump were invited to the primetime debate. Trump, however, declined to participate due to prior confrontations with the network and moderator Megyn Kelly, and instead hosted a town hall with charitable proceeds going to veterans groups. Carly Fiorina, Jim Gilmore, Mike Huckabee, and Rick Santorum were invited to the undercard debate. The undercard debate was only the second of the 2016 cycle to which Gilmore was invited; he was also in the August 6, 2015, undercard debate, also hosted by Fox News.

Immigration and foreign policy featured prominently in this debate. Multiple candidates (namely Rand Paul, Marco Rubio, Chris Christie, and Jeb Bush) used the opportunity to criticize the second-place Cruz, who had also been subjected to attack ads in the weeks before Iowa from prominent Republican leaders. Christie took on Cruz on the issue of the NSA metadata program, and Bush took on both Cruz and Rubio on their senate records and also took on Rubio on his immigration record. Rand Paul and Ted Cruz had 2 exchanges: the 1st on the NSA and Audit the Fed, and the 2nd on immigration. In particular, Cruz and Rubio (the third-place candidate at this point in the race) attacked each other's immigration records.

This was the final debate appearance of Fiorina, Gilmore, Huckabee, Paul, and Santorum. Huckabee suspended his campaign on February 1, while Paul and Santorum ended their presidential bids on February 3. Fiorina and Gilmore were excluded from the following debate, and suspended their campaigns on February 10 and 12, respectively.

=== February 6, 2016 – Goffstown, New Hampshire ===
The eighth debate was held in New Hampshire, the first state to hold primaries, was organized by ABC News and the Independent Journal Review. It was scheduled to be held in the St Anselm's College Institute of Politics. The eighth debate was the first to not feature an undercard event for minor candidates. David Muir and Martha Raddatz were moderaters, along with WMUR political director Josh McElveen and Mary Katherine Ham.

To participate in the debate, a candidate had to have either placed among the top three candidates in the popular vote of the Iowa caucus, or placed among the top six candidates in an average of New Hampshire or national polls recognized by ABC News. Only polls conducted no earlier than January 1 and released by February 4 were included in the averages.

On February 4, 2016, Jeb Bush, Ben Carson, Chris Christie, Ted Cruz, John Kasich, Marco Rubio, and Donald Trump were invited to the debate. Carly Fiorina and Jim Gilmore were not invited as they did not meet the criteria.

The introduction of the candidates caused several mishaps, including Carson missing his introduction and Kasich's introduction being skipped by the announcers. During the debate, Rubio – who was perceived as gaining significant momentum after a close third-place finish in Iowa – faced attacks from Bush and particularly Christie, who criticized Rubio for repeating popular talking points rather than debating specifics. Rubio's poor response to Christie's criticisms led many to consider Rubio as the loser of the debate, with most of his post-Iowa momentum severely blunted by the performance. Conversely, Cruz faced attacks from Carson over allegations that Cruz's campaign, on the night of the Iowa caucuses, was spreading rumors that Carson had already dropped out of the race, so as to switch Carson voters to Cruz. There was also another clash between Trump and Bush over the issue of eminent domain, to the point where Trump was booed by the audience. Trump subsequently accused the audience of consisting mostly of Bush's donors and supporters.

Despite Christie's perceived strong performance, this would ultimately be his final debate appearance, as the governor suspended his campaign four days later, after finishing 6th in New Hampshire.

=== February 13, 2016 – Greenville, South Carolina ===
The ninth debate was held in another early primary state, South Carolina, and organized by CBS News. The debate was moderated by John Dickerson in the Peace Center in Greenville, started at 9 pm ET and went for 90 minutes. Major Garrett of CBS and Kimberley Strassel of WSJ also asked questions. To participate in the debate, a candidate had to have either (1) placed among the top five candidates in the popular vote of the New Hampshire primary, (2) placed among the top three candidates in the popular vote of the Iowa caucuses, or (3) be among the top five candidates in an average of national and South Carolina polls over the four weeks beginning January 15 (that are recognized by CBS) and have received at least 3% in Iowa or New Hampshire or the South Carolina or national polls. The day before the debate, Ben Carson was invited to join the other participants: Jeb Bush, Ted Cruz, John Kasich, Marco Rubio, and Donald Trump.

The debate was particularly combative, with Trump attacking Bush for his stances on illegal immigration, his defense of former president George W. Bush, and his record as governor. It also included Trump saying "The war in Iraq was a big, fat mistake" and "They lied. They said there were weapons of mass destruction -- there were none. And they knew there were none." Bush also took on Kasich on the subject of Medicaid. Cruz had exchanges with Trump over Planned Parenthood and other issues. Cruz also reiterated comments made by Rubio on Univision and when the latter claimed he could not speak Spanish, Cruz retorted using the language and demonstrating that he was bilingual. This was the ninth and final debate appearance of Bush, who suspended his campaign on February 20.

=== February 25, 2016 – Houston, Texas ===
After the caucus in Nevada, the tenth debate was held at the University of Houston in Houston and broadcast by CNN as its third of four debates, in conjunction with Telemundo. The debate aired five days before 14 states voted on Super Tuesday, March 1. While the debate was to be held in partnership with Telemundo's English-language counterpart NBC, RNC Chairman Reince Priebus announced on October 30, 2015, that it had suspended the partnership in response to CNBC's "bad faith" in handling the October 28, 2015, debate. On January 18, 2016, the RNC announced that CNN would replace NBC News as the main host of the debate, in partnership with Telemundo and Salem Communications (CNN's conservative media partner). The debate was shifted a day earlier at the same time. National Review was disinvited by the Republican National Committee from co-hosting the debate over its criticism of GOP front-runner Donald Trump. On February 19, the criteria for invitation to the debate was announced: in addition to having official statements of candidacy with the Federal Election Commission and accepting the rules of the debate, candidates must have received at least 5% support in one of the first four election contests held in Iowa, New Hampshire, South Carolina, and Nevada. By these criteria, all five remaining candidates, Carson, Cruz, Kasich, Rubio, and Trump, qualified for invitation to the debate. This was the tenth and final debate appearance of Carson, who skipped the following debate on March 3, and dropped out of the race the following day.

Rubio and Cruz both were considered winners, while Trump struggled. Both attacked Trump on illegal immigration, Israel, his business record, religious liberty, Planned Parenthood, and healthcare. Trump, after criticizing Rubio for repeating himself in the New Hampshire debate, promptly repeated himself several times when talking about healthcare, which Rubio quickly pointed out, leading to almost a minute of applause. Cruz also attacked Trump on his record of giving to Democrats as well as the polls, and attacked Rubio on illegal immigration and his vote to confirm John Kerry as secretary of state.

=== March 3, 2016 – Detroit, Michigan ===
The eleventh debate was held on March 3, 2016, at the Fox Theatre in downtown Detroit, Michigan. It was the third debate to air on Fox News Channel. Special Report anchor Bret Baier, The Kelly File anchor Megyn Kelly and Fox News Sunday host Chris Wallace served as moderators. It led into the Maine, Kansas, Kentucky, Louisiana, Michigan, Mississippi, Idaho, and Hawaii contests. Fox announced that in order for candidates to qualify, they must have at least 3 percent support in the five most recent national polls by March 1 at 5 pm. Ben Carson said on March 2 he would not be attending the debate. The debate drew controversy for an allusion Trump made to his penis in response to Rubio's comment about the size of his hands. During the debate, Ted Cruz repeated his claim that Donald Trump supported Jimmy Carter and other Democrats for president.

When asked "So what would you do, as commander-in-chief, if the U.S. military refused to carry out those orders?", Trump responded "They won't refuse. They're not going to refuse me. Believe me."

=== March 10, 2016 – Coral Gables, Florida ===
The twelfth debate was the fourth and final debate to air on CNN and led into the Florida, Illinois, North Carolina, Missouri, and Ohio primaries on March 15. The candidates debated at the University of Miami's BankUnited Center arena, moderated by Jake Tapper and questioned by CNN chief political correspondent Dana Bash, Salem Radio Network talk-show host Hugh Hewitt, and The Washington Times contributor Stephen Dinan. The Washington Times cohosted the debate. The debate was originally scheduled considering the unlikelihood that a candidate would clinch the Republican nomination before March 15, due to the overall size of the field. On the day of the debate, CNN summarized the immediate stakes: "This debate comes just five days ahead of 'Super Tuesday 3', when more than 350 delegates are decided, including winner-take-all contests in Florida and Ohio. Both Trump and Rubio are predicting [a win in] Florida. For Trump, a win here would fuel his growing momentum and further grow his delegate lead; for Rubio, losing his home state could be the death knell for his campaign." This was the twelfth and final debate appearance of Rubio, who suspended his campaign on March 15. It was also the twelfth and final debate appearance of Cruz who suspended his campaign on May 3 and the twelfth and final debate appearance of Kasich who suspended his campaign on May 4.

== Canceled debate ==
=== March 21, 2016 – Salt Lake City, Utah ===
A thirteenth debate was originally announced to take place at the Salt Palace in Salt Lake City, Utah, airing on Fox News Channel, and moderated by Bret Baier, Chris Wallace, and Megyn Kelly to lead into the Arizona, Idaho, and Utah primaries. However, on March 16, 2016, Donald Trump announced that he would skip the debate because he was planning to give a "very major speech" at the AIPAC conference. He also said he had debated enough, with the same questions/answers. Additionally, Kasich stated that he would only participate in the debate if Trump were in attendance, while Rubio suspended his campaign on March 15 following his loss in the Florida primaries, leaving only Ted Cruz. As a result, the RNC and Fox News Channel announced that the debate had been cancelled due to the lack of participants, stating that "obviously, there needs to be more than one participant".

As most of the candidates were in Washington for the AIPAC conference, several news channels obtained interviews with the candidates, to air on the night of the cancelled debate instead. Both CNN and Fox News Channel aired interviews with the three remaining Republican candidates, while CNN also aired interviews with the two remaining Democratic candidates.

== Forums ==
=== Schedule ===
Forums among candidates for the 2016 Republican Party U.S. presidential nomination
No.	Date	Time	Place	Host	Participants^{*}																
P Participant, main debate. S Participant, secondary debate. I Invitee, main debate. N Non-invitee. A Absent invitee, main debate. AS Absent invitee, secondary debate. O Out of race (withdrawn).					Bush	Carson	Christie	Cruz	Fiorina	Gilmore	Graham	Huckabee	Jindal	Kasich	Pataki	Paul	Perry	Rubio	Santorum	Trump	Walker
1^{^{†}}	August 3, 2015	5 p.m. EDT	St. Anselm College; Goffstown, NH	C-SPAN	P	P	P	P	P	N	P	A	P	P	P	P	P	P	P	A	P
2^{^{†}}	November 20, 2015	6:30 p.m. CST	CCCU Conv. Ctr. Des Moines, IA	Family Leader	A	P	A	P	P	A	A	P	O	A	A	P	O	P	P	A	O
3^{^{†}}	December 3, 2015	9 a.m. EST	Reagan Building; Washington, D.C.	Rep. Jewish; Coalition	P	P	P	P	P	P	P	P	O	P	P	A	O	P	P	P	O
4^{^{†}}	January 9, 2016	9 a.m. EST	Convention Center; Columbia, SC	Jack Kemp; Foundation	P	P	P	A	A	A	O	P	O	P	O	A	O	P	A	A	O
5^{^{†}}	Feb. 17–18, 2016	8 p.m. EST	Greenville, SC; Columbia, SC	CNN	P	P	O	P	O	O	O	O	O	P	O	O	O	P	O	P	O
6^{^{†}}	February 24, 2016	8 p.m. CST	Queensbury Theatre; Houston, TX	Fox News	O	P	O	P	O	O	O	O	O	P	O	O	O	P	O	A	O
7^{^{†}}	March 9, 2016	7 p.m. EST	Fayetteville, NC; Raleigh, NC; Chicago, IL; Hialeah, FL	Fox News	O	O	O	P	O	O	O	O	O	P	O	O	O	P	O	P	O
8^{^{†}}	March 21, 2016	8 p.m. EST	CNN DC Bureau; Washington, D.C.	CNN	O	O	O	P	O	O	O	O	O	P	O	O	O	O	O	P	O
9^{^{†}}	March 29, 2016	8 p.m. EST	Riverside Theater; Milwaukee, WI	CNN	O	O	O	P	O	O	O	O	O	P	O	O	O	O	O	P	O
^{†}A forum in which candidates speak one at a time with no direct challenges, rather than a debate. Forums are not sanctioned by the RNC; although an RNC rule makes a candidate who participates in a nonsanctioned debate ineligible to participate in a sanctioned one, participation in a forum does not affect a candidate's eligibility to participate in sanctioned debates.
_{*}Participating in at least one debate listed above: Former Gov. Jeb Bush of Florida • Neurosurgeon Dr. Ben Carson of Maryland • Gov. Chris Christie of New Jersey • Sen. Ted Cruz of Texas • Former CEO Carly Fiorina of California • Former Gov. Jim Gilmore of Virginia • Sen. Lindsey Graham of South Carolina • Former Gov. Mike Huckabee of Arkansas • Gov. Bobby Jindal of Louisiana • Gov. John Kasich of Ohio • Former Gov. George Pataki of New York • Sen. Rand Paul of Kentucky • Former Gov. Rick Perry of Texas • Sen. Marco Rubio of Florida • Former Sen. Rick Santorum of Pennsylvania • Businessman Donald Trump of New York • Gov. Scott Walker of Wisconsin

Sites of the 2016 Republican primary forums.

=== August 3, 2015 – Goffstown, New Hampshire ===
The 2016 Voters First Presidential Forum moderator was Jack Heath of WGIR radio, who asked questions of each of the participating candidates based on a random draw. Candidates each had three opportunities to speak: two rounds of questions, and a closing statement. Topics of discussion during the forum were partially selected based on the results of an online voter survey. The facilities were provided by the New Hampshire Institute of Politics and Political Library of St. Anselm College. The forum was organized in response to the top-ten invitation limitations placed by Fox News and CNN on their first televised debates (see descriptions below).

Eleven of the candidates were present in person; Senators Ted Cruz, Rand Paul, and Marco Rubio participated in the forum via satellite to avoid missing a vote. Three major Republican candidates who did not participate were Donald Trump (who chose not to attend), Jim Gilmore (who missed the cutoff deadline) and Mike Huckabee (who was invited, but did not respond). Mark Everson did not receive an invitation, albeit after a "serious look".

The Voters First forum was broadcast nationally by C-SPAN as the originating source media entity, beginning at 6:30 p.m. EDT and lasting from 7 to 9 p.m. The event was also simulcast and/or co-sponsored by television stations KCRG-TV in Iowa, New England Cable News in the northeast, WBIN-TV in New Hampshire, WLTX-TV in South Carolina, radio stations New Hampshire Public Radio, WGIR in New Hampshire, iHeartRadio on the internet (C-SPAN is also offering an online version of the broadcast), and newspapers the Cedar Rapids Gazette in Iowa, the Union Leader in New Hampshire, and the Post and Courier in Charleston, South Carolina. There was a live audience, with tickets to the event awarded via a lottery.

=== November 20, 2015 – Des Moines, Iowa ===
The Presidential Family Forum was held in the Community Choice Credit Union Convention Center in Des Moines, Iowa. Ben Carson, Ted Cruz, Carly Fiorina, Mike Huckabee, Rand Paul, Marco Rubio, and Rick Santorum attended the forum hosted by evangelical Christian advocacy group The Family Leader. It was hosted by politician and political activist Bob Vander Plaats and moderated by political consultant and pollster Frank Luntz. Protesters interrupted the beginning of the event and were removed by police.

=== December 3, 2015 – Washington, D.C. ===
The Republican Jewish Coalition Presidential Candidates Forum was held in the Ronald Reagan Building and International Trade Center by the lobbyist group Republican Jewish Coalition. All candidates except Rand Paul attended the eight-hour-long forum.

=== January 9, 2016 – Columbia, South Carolina ===
The Kemp Forum was held in the Columbia Metropolitan Convention Center by the Jack Kemp Foundation. Bush, Carson, Christie, Huckabee, Kasich, and Rubio attended. Fiorina was scheduled to attend the forum, but missed her flight. The forum was moderated by Speaker of the House Paul Ryan and Senator Tim Scott.

=== February 17–18, 2016 – Greenville/Columbia, South Carolina ===
The CNN Republican town halls were held in Greenville, South Carolina, and Columbia, South Carolina.

=== February 24, 2016 – Houston, Texas ===
Megyn Kelly hosted a two-hour town hall event on the Kelly File with Kasich, Cruz, Rubio, and Carson in attendance. Trump did not participate in the forum.

=== March 29, 2016 – Milwaukee, Wisconsin ===
CNN hosted a town hall moderated by Anderson Cooper airing from 8 to 11 pm EST. The three remaining candidates, Trump, Cruz, and Kasich, all participated in the town hall.

== See also ==
- 2016 Republican Party presidential primaries
- 2016 Republican Party presidential candidates
- 2016 Democratic Party presidential debates and forums
- 2016 Green Party presidential debates and forums
- 2016 Libertarian Party presidential debates and forums
- 2016 United States presidential debates
