= Matthew Miller (journalist) =

American journalist (born 1962)

- Born: 1962 (age 63–64); New York City, New York, U.S.
- Education: Brown University (BA); Columbia Law School (JD)
- Occupation: Journalist
- Spouse: Jody Greenstone Miller
- Family: Milton Petrie (grandfather)

Matthew Miller (born 1962) is an American journalist, senior fellow at the Center for American Progress, a monthly columnist for Fortune, regular contributor to The New York Times Magazine and The Atlantic Monthly, and author of The Two Percent Solution. He also appears regularly on CNN.

Miller was an unsuccessful candidate for Congress in California's 33rd congressional district during the 2014 election. The primary followed Henry Waxman's announced retirement from the House of Representatives.

== Life and career ==
Miller is the son of Marianne (née Petrie) and Tilden E. Miller. His grandfather was retail executive Milton Petrie. He is a graduate of Blind Brook High School in Rye Brook, New York. He received a B.A. degree from Brown University (1983) and a J.D. degree from Columbia Law School (1986).

In the 1990s, Miller served as an advisor to the Office of Management and Budget in the Clinton administration. Miller is a senior advisor to global management consulting firm McKinsey & Company and to the firm's in-house economics think-tank McKinsey Global Institute. Miller was a co-host of the nationally syndicated public radio program Left, Right & Center from the mid-1990s until January 2015, representing the center. Miller's last episode as co-host was January 30, 2015.

On February 14, 2014, Miller announced his candidacy for the seat of Henry Waxman retiring member for California's 33rd congressional district He finished fifth in the primary election, with 12%.

== Politics ==
Miller has been characterized as a leading radical centrist, and has written columns defining and supporting radical centrism. Miller supports universal health insurance, increased education spending, school vouchers and other goals detailed in his book. Miller supported the 2003 invasion of Iraq but later stated that he was wrong in supporting the war, stating, "If I'd known beforehand that Hussein did not possess weapons of mass destruction, I would not have supported the war."

== Personal life ==
In 1995 he married Jody Greenstone Miller.

== Bibliography ==
- Miller, Matthew (2003). The Two Percent Solution. New York: PublicAffairs. ISBN 1-58648-289-0.
- Miller, Matthew (2009). The Tyranny of Dead Ideas. New York: Henry Holt and Company. ISBN 978-0-8050-8787-1.
