= Milton Petrie =

American retailer, investor and philanthropist

- Born: August 5, 1902; Salt Lake City, Utah, US
- Died: November 6, 1994 (aged 92)
- Occupation: Businessman
- Known for: founder of Petrie Stores
- Spouse: Carroll McDaniel
- Children: Bernard Petrie; Marianne Petrie Miller; Patricia Petrie Hugenberg
- Parent: Minnie Petrie
- Family: Matthew Miller (grandson)

Milton Petrie (August 5, 1902 – November 6, 1994) was an American retailer, investor and philanthropist. He made a fortune from a chain of retail stores and supplemented it through a series of investments in real estate and stocks. He was well known in New York City as a philanthropist who gave money to universities and cultural institutions and also to many individuals.

== Early life and career ==
His parents were Russian Jewish immigrants who were running a pawn shop in Salt Lake City when he was born. In 1927, he started a chain of hosiery stores, but it ultimately failed. He then built a large retail company called Petrie Stores, which operated over 1700 discount women's clothing stores under various names, Petries, Three Sisters, Jean Nicole, Rave, Stuarts, Winkleman's, Marianne's and G & G. In 1977, his $10 million investment in a consortium organized by A. Alfred Taubman to buy the Irvine Company returned $100 million. In 1987, he began to acquire shares in Toys "R" Us for less than a dollar per share. His stake grew to 38% percent of the company and was worth $1.5 billion at the time of his death.

== Philanthropy ==
Petrie was known for large contributions to educational and cultural institutions in New York. The Carroll and Milton Petrie European Sculpture Court at the Metropolitan Museum of Art was named in appreciation of his gift of $10 million to the museum. In appreciation for his $1 million gift to the Cathedral of Saint John the Divine, his likeness is carved in the form of a corbel on the wall of the cathedral's south bell tower. He also gave millions more to the Beth Israel Medical Center, United Jewish Appeal, and Memorial Sloan-Kettering Cancer Center. The Minnie Petrie Synagogue at the Hebrew Union College-Jewish Institute of Religion in Manhattan is named after his mother.

Petrie was also known for his gifts to ordinary individuals. He gave $20,000 a year to Marla Hanson, a model whose face was slashed in an attack instigated by a former landlord. He was especially generous to police officers. He pledged $20,000 a year to the widow of Anthony Venditti, a New York City police detective who was killed in a 1986 shootout, as well as setting up trust funds for the college education of the detective's children. He made the same gift to the widow of Louis Miller, a New York City police detective who was killed in 1987 and to Steven McDonald, a New York City police officer who was shot and paralyzed in 1987.

== Personal life ==
Petrie was married to Yetta Fridman with whom he had a son, Bernard Petrie. In 1978, he married his fourth wife, a Baptist by upbringing from Greenville, South Carolina and three-times-married, Carroll McDaniel Portago Carey-Hughes Pistell Petrie. She was the ex-wife of the Spanish race car driver Alfonso de Portago. At the time of Petrie's death, he was survived by his wife Carroll, his children by earlier marriages Bernard Petrie, Marianne Miller and Patricia Hugenberg, grandchildren Matthew Miller and Kurt Hugenberg, and great grandchild Anthony Aria Petrie Hugenberg. Services were held at Temple Emanuel in New York City. At his death, he left $300–400 million to establish the Carroll and Milton Petrie Foundation, which continued his philanthropy.
