= Flowing Wells High School =

Coordinates: 32.2750°N 110.9973°W

Location
- 3725 N. Flowing Wells Road; Tucson, Arizona 85705; United States of America

Information
- School type: Public high school
- Motto: F-Dub, you Know!
- School district: Flowing Wells Unified School District
- CEEB code: 030485
- Principal: Frank Thomas
- Staff: 81.92 (on an FTE basis)
- Grades: 9–12
- Enrollment: 1,708 (2023–2024)
- Student to teacher ratio: 20.85
- Colors: Navy and gold
- Mascot: Caballeros
- Rivals: Amphitheater High School
- Website: fwhs.flowingwellsschools.org

Flowing Wells High School (est. 1954) is a secondary school in Tucson, Arizona. It is the primary high school in the Flowing Wells Unified School District, the other being Sentinel Peak High School.

== Curriculum ==
Flowing Wells offers several AP courses, including Biology, Psychology, Environmental Science, Chemistry, U.S. History, European History, Government, Human Geography, Macroeconomics, Microeconomics, English III, English IV, Pre-calculus, Calculus AB, Physics, Spanish, Computer Science Principles, and Statistics. AP Music Theory has also been offered in the past. The school also offers many CTE and fine arts classes for students, along with having JTED classes. Flowing Wells also has a dual-enrollment programme with Pima Community College.

The high school also places a high value on arts education and charges students only small fees for sports participation, keeping items such as sports uniforms being for all participating students.

Flowing Wells awards two different kinds of diplomas, a standard or "blue" diploma matching state graduation requirements, and a "gold" advanced studies diploma, earned by having two foreign language credits and having at least a 3.0 GPA. A valedictorian, salutatorian, seniors graduating with distinction, Arizona Academic Scholars, and a Seal of Biliteracy are also recognised upon graduation.

== Traditions ==
The Flowing Wells High School has many traditions, such as large and loud pep assemblies every quarter of the school year with the game lover's leap being played beforehand. Spirit Week (where a theme is chosen every day that students are encouraged to dress as) is similarly done before pep assemblies. Every day during morning announcements, Frank Thomas asks a trivia question. A number is also given, and whoever the nth student to correctly answer the question is given a prize.

== Awards ==
- In 1968, it won the National Bellamy Award.
- In the 1986–87 school year, it was honored as a Blue Ribbon school.
- A+ School of Excellence Award (1986, 1991, 2002, 2004, 2023)

== Notable alumni ==
- Dominick Cruz – professional mixed martial artist, former UFC Bantamweight Champion
- Mo Elleithee – A political campaign strategist and current executive director of Georgetown Institute of Politics and Public Service
- Marcus Titus – deaf American swimmer who made it as far as eighth place in the 2012 Olympic Trials.

== See also ==
- Flowing Wells Witch Trial
