= Tony Blankley =

American political analyst (1948–2012)

- Born: January 21, 1948; London, England
- Died: January 7, 2012 (aged 63); Washington, D.C., U.S.
- Education: Fairfax High School; UCLA, B.S. (political science); Loyola Marymount University, J.D. University of London, international law certificate
- Occupations: Public relations executive, newspaper editor, television commentator, radio commentator, prosecutor, child actor
- Notable work: The West's Last Chance: Will We Win the Clash of Civilizations? (2005); American Grit: What It Will Take to Survive and Win in the 21st Century (2009)
- Political party: Republican
- Spouse: Lynda Davis c. 1985–2012 (his death)
- Children: 3

Anthony David Blankley (January 21, 1948 – January 7, 2012) was an American political analyst who served as press secretary for Speaker of the House Newt Gingrich and as a regular panelist on The McLaughlin Group. He later became an executive vice president at Edelman, a Washington, D.C.–based public relations firm.

He was a visiting senior fellow in national security communications at The Heritage Foundation and a weekly contributor to the nationally syndicated public radio programme Left, Right & Center, author of The West's Last Chance: Will We Win the Clash of Civilizations? and American Grit: What It Will Take to Survive and Win in the 21st Century. From 2002 to 2009, he served as editorial page editor at The Washington Times.

== Early life and education ==
Blankley was born in London, England, on January 21, 1948. He was a child actor briefly, appearing as Rod Steiger's son in The Harder They Fall, starring Humphrey Bogart and released in 1956. The movie was, as Blankley liked to joke, both his and his co-star Bogart's last movie.

He graduated from the University of California, Los Angeles, and then Loyola Law School in Los Angeles, where he earned a J.D. He was admitted to the State Bar of California in 1972.

== Career ==
Blankley spent ten years as a deputy attorney general with the California attorney general's office.

He then served in the Reagan administration as a policy analyst and speechwriter, and was a staff writer for Congresswoman Bobbi Fiedler. He then served for seven years as press secretary to House Speaker Newt Gingrich.

From 2002 to 2009, Blankley was an editorial page editor for The Washington Times, a contributing editor and monthly columnist for George magazine, and a regular panelist on The McLaughlin Group. He was a regular commentator for radio shows, including The Diane Rehm Show, Left, Right & Center, and The Steve Gill Show with a segment titled Fill In the Blanks.

In 2006, he authored a book, The West's Last Chance, in which he argued that, "Within our lifetimes, Europe could become Eurabia, a continent overwhelmed by militant Islam, which poses a greater threat to the United States than Nazi Germany did."

He lectured at universities and institutes. On November 19, 2009, he presented his lecture, A Year out from the 2010 Congressional Elections – National Politics, Policy and their Communication, at the New Hampshire Institute of Politics at Saint Anselm College.

=== Political views ===
His political opinions were considered to fall within traditional conservatism, although he was labeled as a neoconservative by some critics. He denied that label, claiming that his views are more comparable to a classic conservative such as Ronald Reagan.

== Death ==
Blankley died of stomach cancer at Sibley Memorial Hospital in Washington, D.C., on January 7, 2012, at age 63.

== Selected filmography ==
- Alfred Hitchcock Presents (1955) (Season 1 Episode 12: "Santa Claus and the Tenth Avenue Kid") as boy
- The Harder They Fall (1956) as Nick's son
