= Flowing Wells Unified School District =

School district in Arizona, United States

Address
- 1556 West Prince Road Tucson, Arizona, 85705; United States

District information
- Type: Public
- Motto: F-Dub, You Know!
- Grades: PreK–12
- Superintendent: Dr. Stoltzfus
- NCES District ID: 0403010

Students and staff
- Students: 5,408
- Teachers: 329.73
- Staff: 288.77
- Student–teacher ratio: 16.40
- Colors: Blue and Gold

Other information
- Website: www.flowingwellsschools.org

The Flowing Wells Unified School District is a unified school district headquartered at 1556 West Prince Road, Tucson, Arizona. It serves much of Flowing Wells, as well as bits of Tucson, Marana, Cortaro, Casas Adobes, & unnamed, unincorporated parts of Pima County. The district does practice open enrollment for students outside of district boundaries, provided said students maintain certain academic performance.

The school district serves some 5,500 students in eleven schools. It was founded in 1889 as the Rillito School District and changed in 1928 due to an error in documentation in the Arizona School Directory. As of 2021, the superintendent is Dr. Kevin Stoltzfus.

In fiscal year 2023, the district had a budget of approximately $63.7 million.

The district is overseen by a 5-member board that holds public meetings twice a month.

== Schools ==
=== Early childhood ===
- Emily Meschter Early Learning Center (Teddy Bears)

=== Elementary schools ===
- Centennial Elementary School (Coyotes)
- Homer Davis Elementary School (Dragons)
- Douglas Elementary School (Bulldogs)
- J. Robert Hendricks Elementary School (Hawks)
- Laguna Elementary School (Longhorns) (originally the sole school of the since annexed Pima County School District No. 17)
- Robert S. Richardson Elementary School (Roadrunners)

=== Junior high school ===
- Flowing Wells Junior High School (Mustangs)

=== High schools ===
- Flowing Wells High School (Caballeros)
- Sentinel Peak High School (Scorpions)

== See also ==
- Flowing Wells Witch Trial
