= Mo Elleithee =

American lobbyist

Mohamad Aly "Mo" Elleithee (born December 13, 1972) is an American Democratic political campaign strategist.

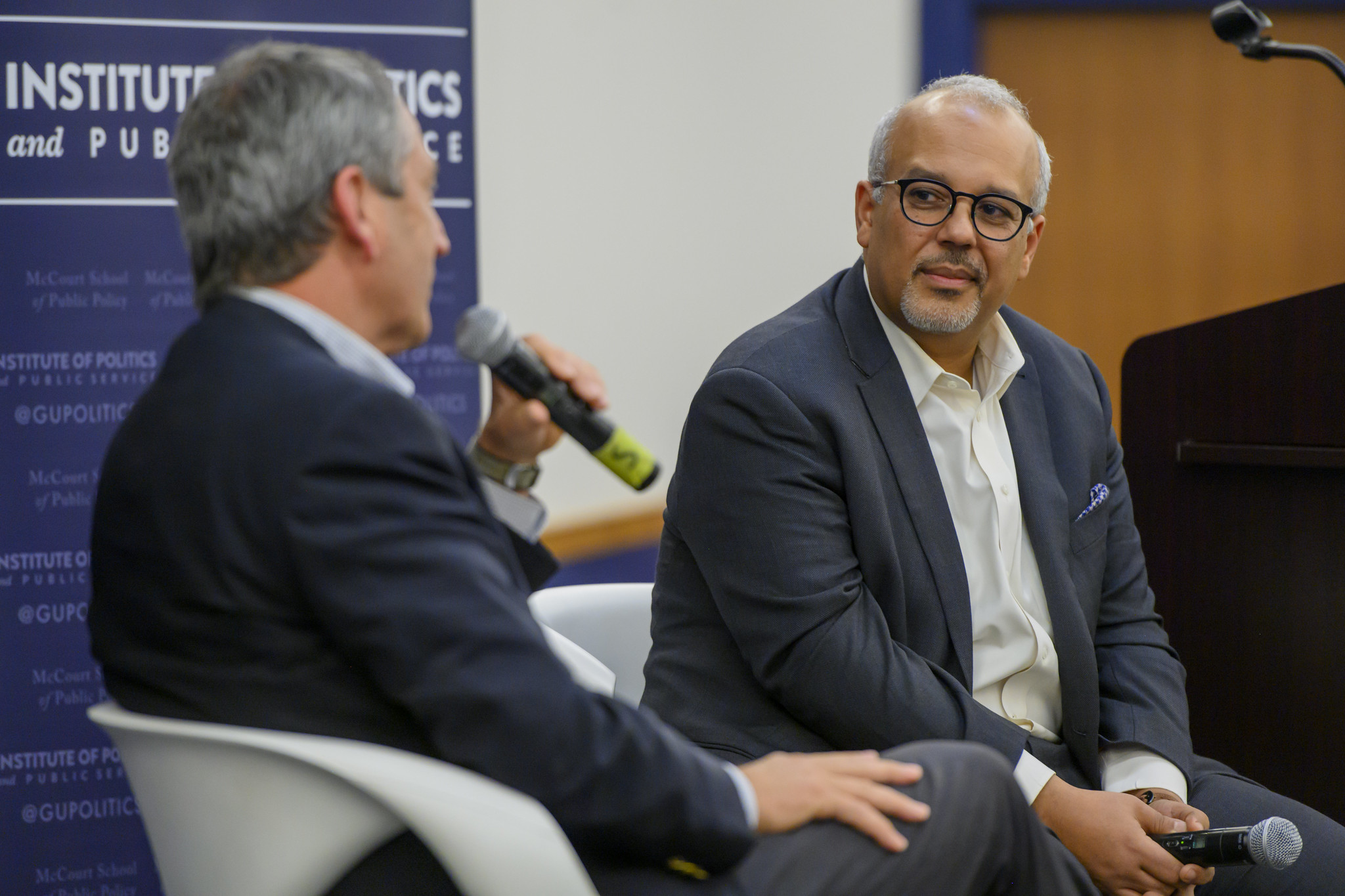
Ellleithee at GU Politics Forum event

== Personal life and education ==
Born in New Jersey, Elleithee grew up in Tucson, Arizona, to parents who had immigrated a year prior from Egypt. He was a student at Flowing Wells High School before moving to Washington, D.C., to attend Georgetown University, from which he graduated in 1994 with a degree from the School of Foreign Service. He received his master's degree in political management from George Washington University, also in Washington, D.C., in 1996.

== Career ==
A Democrat, he has served as spokesman for the Democratic National Committee, Hillary Clinton, and other Democratic elected officials and organizations.

He is currently executive director of the Institute of Politics and Public Service at Georgetown University. In 2016, he became a Fox News political contributor. He has co-hosted Left, Right & Center.

== Private life ==
He is married to Tali Stein. He and his wife have two children.
