= Flowing Wells witch trial =

1970s civil case in Tucson, Arizona

The Flowing Wells witch trial was a series of events that resulted in the 1971 firing of Ann Stewart, a tenured teacher, by the Flowing Wells Unified School District in Tucson, Arizona, under charges that she claimed to be a witch and taught witchcraft to her students. A later legal challenge overturned the firing and required the district to rehire the teacher.

== Background ==
In late 1969, an expert on folklore and witchcraft from the University of Arizona was invited to speak to upperclassmen at Flowing Wells High School in northern Tucson, Arizona. The presentation included a description of physical attributes for witches. These included blond hair, a widow's peak, green or blue eyes, a preference for wearing devil's green (a shade between chartreuse and lime), and a pointed left ear. Shortly thereafter, students began joking with Ann Stewart, an English instructor with over a decade teaching experience, about how closely she matched the description of a witch. Seeing an opportunity to stimulate her students' interest in American literature and folklore, Stewart responded with "What do you think?" when her students asked if she was a witch. As Stewart later explained, "I never said I was a witch, I told the students I had the physical characteristics of a witch, and they chose to believe I was one." She also suggested her students learn about astrology as another method to promote interest in literature.

During this time rumors grew among the student body that Stewart was a witch. Some of the following year's incoming freshmen began speculating Stewart was a witch after she dressed as a witch for a presentation about folklore given at a local middle school. Stewart claimed her discussions of witches and witchcraft were focused on their appearances in literature. This view was not universal however as a petition signed by the majority of her fellow faculty supported her removal. As one student recalled, Stewart discussed witchcraft with her students but "did not try to influence or convince students of the reality of witchcraft".

== Situation ==
Stewart was suspended from her position on November 27, 1970. The reason for her suspension was "teaching about witchcraft, having stated that you were a witch in a way that affects students psychologically". Other charges were that Stewart discussed subjects not in the curriculum to the detriment of curriculum material, being a poor influence to students, insubordination, and causing mental stress in other teachers. Stewart denied charges against her and claimed her removal was due to a personality conflict between her and the school's principal.

Reports of the suspension made international news, which prompted neighbors and former friends to avoid Stewart, and she started receiving letters that read, "Thou shall not suffer a witch to live". Stewart in turn changed her hair style to hide her widow's peak and began wearing an ebony cross that had belonged to her great-great-grandmother. As to her reason for wearing the cross, Stewart said, "I wear it because a real witch wouldn't dare and I want to demonstrate that I've been defamed."

An appeal of the suspension was made to the school board on December 9, 1970. The board deferred making a decision and instead formed a committee of faculty members to investigate the charges and recommend what action to take. A final hearing on the suspension was scheduled by the board for March 22, 1971. During the hearing the board officially decided not to renew Stewart's contract for the upcoming school year.

After her firing, Stewart filed a legal challenge to the board's decision. Her suit claimed she did not receive proper notice of the hearing and that the board violated a state law requiring such a hearing to occur before March 15. The court sided with Stewart and ordered the school district to rehire Stewart. In the ruling, the judge stated "It is obvious, unfortunately, that the school district has not complied with the requisite statutory procedures for dismissing a tenured teacher as have heretofore been approved by our state supreme court." As of February 1972, she had not been rehired; no further sources report whether she returned to the school later.
