= Georgetown Institute of Politics and Public Service =

- Motto: Public service is a good thing. Politics can be, too.
- Parent institution: McCourt School of Public Policy, Georgetown University
- Established: 2015; 11 years ago
- Mission: To help prepare more young people to go into public service.
- Director: Mo Elleithee
- Location: Washington, D.C.
- Website: politics.georgetown.edu

The Georgetown Institute of Politics and Public Service (GU Politics) is a nonpartisan extracurricular program associated with the McCourt School of Public Policy at Georgetown University in Washington, D.C. It was announced in 2013 as part of the school's founding and launched operations in June 2015 to help prepare Georgetown students to go into public service.

== History ==
GU Politics was announced as part of the McCourt School of Public Policy in the fall of 2013. In June 2015, Mo Elleithee, the former communications director of the Democratic National Committee, was appointed its first executive director, and in fall 2015, GU Politics launched its first programs. The goal of the institute is to serve as an "incubator of political thought" in a bipartisan manner and to study such matters as leadership, governance, elections, and public engagement. It brings candidates for public office and incumbents, including presidential candidates, and political practitioners to Georgetown's campus and enable "student-driven conversation."

Since the launch of GU Politics in fall 2015, it has hosted over 725 of the top names in politics, journalism, and government as speakers, and had 117 leaders in politics and journalism serve as GU Politics Fellows.

== Organizations ==
=== GU Politics Fellows and Student Strategy Teams ===
As part of the GU Politics Fellows program, a number of prominent individuals in politics, journalism, and/or public service are invited to Georgetown every semester to host weekly discussion sections, office hours, and campus panels. As part of the program, Georgetown students are given the opportunity to serve on Student Strategy Teams, which advise their assigned GU Politics Fellow on how to connect with the Georgetown University community.

=== Advance Team ===
The Advance Team refers to the volunteer group of students that assist GU Politics in the "behind-the-scenes" logistics, operation, and execution of GU Politics speaker events.

=== GU Votes ===
GU Votes is an on-campus voter assistance initiative that aims to assist students, faculty, staff, and other members of the Georgetown University community in the voting process. In 2019, GU Votes successfully advocated for the Office of the Registrar to include voter registration info on the University's class registration portal. Additionally, the organization organizes annual on-campus voter registration drives in student dormitories and with various faculty departments.

=== The Fly ===
The Fly is GU Politics' student-run weekly political podcast. The Fly has interviewed hundreds of leaders in politics, journalism, and public service, including CBS News Correspondent Norah O'Donnell and former Chief Medical Advisor to the President of United States Anthony Fauci.

=== On The Record ===
On The Record is GU Politics' student-run print publication. Its mission statement is:

"to promote a better understanding of politics, encourage respectful dialogue, and contribute to the political conversation in Washington and beyond."

=== Site visits ===
The institute regularly organizes trips to visit party conventions, caucuses, national and international elections, and more in order to allow students to experience politics firsthand. In the past, GU Politics has brought students to watch the 2025 Canadian federal election, the 2024 Republican National Convention, and both the 2016 Republican National Convention and 2016 Democratic National Convention.

=== Student Advisory Board ===
GU Politics programming is informed by both the Hilltop Campus and Capitol Campus Student Advisory Boards, led by students at the undergraduate and graduate levels.
