= 2016 Libertarian Party presidential debates and forums =

A series of political debates were held between the Libertarian candidates for US president in the 2016 presidential election.

== Presidential debates ==
=== Schedule ===
The following presidential candidates participated in debates: Thomas Clements, JD Donaghe, Marc Allan Feldman, Cecil Ince, Gary Johnson, Steve Kerbel, John McAfee, Kevin McCormick, Darryl W. Perry, Austin Petersen, Derrick Michael Reid, Jack Robinson, Jr., Sam Sloan, Rhett Smith, Shawna Sterling, Vermin Supreme, Joy Waymire, and Heidi Zeman. Will Coley, a vice-presidential candidate, also appeared in one presidential debate.

Debates among candidates for the 2016 Libertarian Party U.S. presidential nomination
Date	Place	Host	Participants													
P Participant, main debate. S Participant, secondary debate only. A Absent. N Confirmed non-invitee. O Out of race (exploring, suspended, or not yet entered)			Clements	Feldman	Ince	Johnson	Kerbel	McAfee	McCormick	Perry	Petersen	Reid	Robinson	Smith	Sterling	others
October 17, 2015	Worcester, MA	Libertarian Party of Massachusetts	O	P	A	O	P	O	O	P	O	P	A	A	A	none
February 27	Biloxi, MS	Libertarian Party of Alabama; Libertarian Party of Mississippi	S	P	S	P	A	P	O	P	P	S	S	S	S	none
March 5	Marietta, GA	Libertarian Party of Georgia	P	A	A	A (Note: Jim Gray stood in for Johnson.)	A	P	A	A	P	A	A (Note: David Robinson stood in for Robinson.)	A	P	none
March 5	Sandston, VA	Libertarian Party of Virginia	A	A	A	P	A	A	A	P	A	P	P	P	A	none
March 7	Raleigh, NC; Google Hangouts	Libertarian Party of North Carolina	N	N	N	P	P	P	N	P	P	N	P	N	N	none
March 11	Springfield, IL	Libertarian Party of Illinois	A	P	P	P	A	A	A	A	P	P	A	P	P	none
March 12	Colorado Springs, CO	Libertarian Party of Colorado	A	S	S	P	P	A (Note: Chris Thrasher stood in for McAfee, and made the second debate round.)	A	S	P	A	P	A	S	none
March 19	Philadelphia, PA	Libertarian Party of Pennsylvania	A	P	O	P	O	A	A	P	A	P	A	A	A	none
March 25	Hillsboro, OR	Libertarian Party of Oregon PAC	A	A	O	P	O	A	A	A	P	A	A	A	A	none
March 29 April 1 and 8 (air)	New York, NY	Stossel; Fox Business Network	N	N	O	P	O	P	N	N	P	N	N	N	N	none
April 1	Washington, D.C.	Public Square, Inc.	N	P	O	N	O	N	N	P	N	N	N	N	N	none
April 2	Los Angeles, CA	Libertarian Party of California	A	P	O	P	O	P	S	A (Note: Starchild read a statement from Perry.)	P	S	A	S	A	Sloan; Waymire; Zeman
April 8	San Antonio, TX	Libertarian Party of Texas	N	P	O	P	O	P	N	N	P	N	N	N	P	none
April 9	Palm Beach, FL	Libertarian Party of Florida	A	P	O	P	O	A	A	P	P	A	A	A	A	none
April 16	Baton Rouge, LA	Libertarian Party of Louisiana	P	A	O	A	O	A	A	P	A	A	P	P	A	none
April 16	Maple Grove, MN	Libertarian Party of Minnesota	A	A	O	P	O	A	A	A	A	A	A	A	P	none
April 30	New York, NY	Libertarian Party of New York	A	S	O	P	O	P	A	P	P	S	A	A	A	Coley; Supreme
May 16 May 20 (air)	Las Vegas, NV	Libertarian Party of Nevada; TheBlaze	N	N	O	P	O	P	N	N	P	N	N	N	N	none
May 26	Orlando, FL	Libertarian Party National Convention	S	P (Note: Feldman was promoted to the primary debate from the secondary debate.)	O	P	O	P	S	P	P	?	?	?	S	Donaghe
May 28	Orlando, FL	Libertarian Party National Convention; C-SPAN	N	P	O	P	O	P	N	P	P	N	N	N	N	none

=== April 1 and 8 – New York – Fox Business Network ===
The first nationally televised Libertarian Party presidential debate was hosted by Fox Business Network on John Stossel's show Stossel. The two-hour debate was divided into two one-hour segments which were televised on April 1 and 8 at 9:00 Eastern Time. The debate featured the three highest-polling candidates, as measured by the Libertarian Party's own online poll. The candidates featured in the debate were former Republican Governor of New Mexico Gary Johnson, "The Libertarian Republic" founder Austin Petersen and anti-virus software developer John McAfee; John Stossel moderated the debate which featured questions from himself, Fox media personalities (second part) and people who submitted their questions on social media. All three candidates were afforded about the same amount of time to speak at the debate.

In the first hour of the debate, the main focus was on religious liberty and discrimination. Johnson said:

I think that if you discriminate on the basis of religion, I think that is a black hole. I think you should be able to discriminate for stink or you're not wearing shoes or whatever. If we discriminate on the basis of religion, to me, that's doing harm to a big class of people.

Petersen then asked whether a Jewish baker should be required to bake a Nazi-themed wedding cake, to which Johnson replied: "That would be my contention, yes." However, McAfee said:

If you're the only baker in town, it may be a problem. But no one is forcing you to buy anything or to choose one person over another. So why should I be forced to do anything if I am not harming you? It's my choice to sell, your choice to buy.

Petersen's responded to Johnson's statement:

This portrays a fundamental lack of understanding of the free market. You have to allow the marketplace to work. The government cannot stamp out bigotry. The government is not supposed to make us into better people – that's not what the United States was founded on.

Another topic was foreign policy, specifically the United States' role in military intervention. Johnson said we should go to war only "when attacked;" Petersen said we should cut "every penny" of foreign aid, and McAfee questioned why we need to go to war and told Stossel that he is running for president "because our bodies and our minds belong to ourselves". On the issue of marijuana, Johnson advocated for the legalization of marijuana, saying that it "will lead to less overall substance abuse". Furthermore, he noted that he is the highest official to advocate for the legalization of marijuana. On the contrary, Petersen said that "the federal government should have absolutely no role [in determining the legality of drugs]" and that it should be left to the states. On the issue of social security, Petersen said that "the government stole our money in the first place and they should give it back" and even proposed an option to "let young people opt out of social security".

Other topics discussed during the first hour were abortion, Social Security, gender-pay equality and the national debt. While there was some disagreement over abortion, Social Security, and gender-pay equality, all of the candidates on the stage agreed on the need to balance the federal budget in order to reduce the national debt. Towards the end of the debate, Stossel grilled the candidates on their past. For Johnson, Stossel noted that he is the CEO of a marijuana company and that in 2012 he only got 1% of the vote as the Libertarian Party nominee. Johnson responded by citing that marijuana is soon going to be legalized nationwide and that he received the most votes of any Libertarian Party candidate in the history of their party (1.2 million). For McAfee, Stossel made him clarify what happened when his property was raided in Belize. McAfee explained that the government wanted him to pay the extra money and that they were the ones that raided his home. McAfee also had to clarify that his DUI was self-inflicted and that he took all responsibility for his actions. Petersen was asked how he is only 35 years old and would be the youngest president ever elected. Petersen responded by noting the ages of the Founding Fathers at the Constitutional Convention and how they were all in their twenties or thirties.

On Twitter, Stossel polled users on who they thought had won the debate and what the candidates best lines were. Out of the 1,704 votes Petersen won with 49% saying that he performed the best, he was followed by Johnson at 29% and McAfee at 22%. A similar poll was conducted by the Libertarian Party on their website showing similar results. Johnson received high marks when he said: "I advocated for legalizing marijuana, I'm the highest official to do that." Petersen's best line was that "all humans deserve the same right to life, liberty, and the pursuit of happiness". McAfee's stand out line came when talking about cyber security "we are 20 years behind the Chinese in potato security...we'll be speaking Chinese in 5 years." A notable moment was when Johnson kissed McAfee on the cheek, in stark contrast from the infighting from the two major parties.

Part two of the Libertarian Party presidential debate was broadcast on April 8 at 21:00 Eastern Time on the Fox Business Network. Social media responses were similar in the hours after the debate. During the second hour of the debate, candidates took questions about immigration, free trade, jobs, using phones to prevent non-state terrorism (specifically the Apple case in San Bernardino, California), environmental issues by the government, Keystone XL pipeline, eminent domain, drug legalization, drug addiction, prostitution, protecting the Constitution, where they agreed almost identically.

The main point of contention came during a discussion about gun rights where Johnson raised the question about taking guns away from the mentally ill. Petersen quickly blasted the Governor stating the second amendment rights, and McAfee took Petersen's side. McAfee questioned how you can determine who is "mentally ill". Petersen questioned Governor Johnson on his stance on background checks. Johnson replied by talking about his record as Governor of New Mexico where he passed concealed carry laws. However, he failed to come up with a way to address how someone is "mentally ill".

It was estimated that the viewing audience was around 200,000.

=== May 12 – Washington, DC – RT America ===
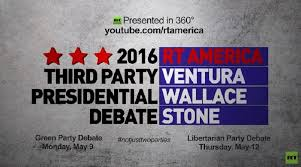

On May 12, a second televised Libertarian debate was aired and hosted by RT America. It was televised live. The three main candidates were invited but did not participate. Instead, Marc Allan Feldman, Darryl W. Perry and Kevin McCormick appeared in the event. The debate was moderated by Tyrel Ventura (son of former Minnesota Governor Jesse Ventura) and Tabetha Wallace. RT America also hosted a televised debate for the Green Party three days prior.

Perry surprised the moderators during the debate when he said he wanted to end the United States federal government, going as far as to say "the United States government is the world's largest terrorist organization".

=== May 20 – Las Vegas – TheBlaze ===
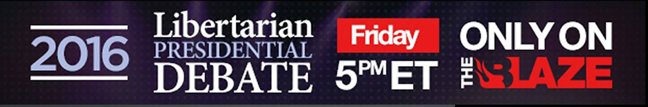

On May 16, the three leading Libertarian candidates (Johnson, Petersen and McAfee) participated in a debate held in Las Vegas, Nevada. Longtime Libertarian and entertainer Penn Jillette hosted the debate, which was aired by TheBlaze cable channel on May 20. The candidates were asked questions by other celebrities, including comedians Drew Carey, Carrot Top, Jeff Ross as well as Dee Snider of Twisted Sister and The Five co-host Greg Gutfeld. The debate focused on corporate greed, the War on Drugs and the government's use of force, both at home and abroad. "The government is, by definition, force, and there are certain things you need to do. You need to do defense, you need to do courts, you need to do police. But beyond that, I don't know if we have to use a lot of force to decide how people make their lawns look," Jillette said. On the issues Johnson said, "The fact that we have the highest incarceration rate of any country in the world, the War on Drugs is really about Black Lives Matter. With regard to our military interventions, I think that they have the unintended consequence of making things worse, not better," Johnson said. "They're probably fine human beings, but the two-party system takes the soul of a man or woman," McAfee said. "That has to change. It is why we, as Americans, are so dissatisfied. Where will they turn? There's only us."

=== May 26 and 28 – Orlando – Libertarian National Convention ===

On May 26 and May 28, the presidential candidates debated during the Libertarian National Convention. The preliminary May 26 debate was not televised, and included three tiers. The top tier debate included candidates Feldman, Johnson, McAfee, Perry, and Petersen. Participants in the May 28 debate were determined by a token system. To be invited, a candidate had to earn the tokens of at least 10% of registered delegates. Feldman, Johnson, McAfee, Perry, and Petersen all earned enough tokens to participate in the May 28 debate. Larry Elder moderated the debate. C-SPAN televised the May 28 debate live.

The debate stirred some criticism when Gary Johnson was met with boos after saying he would've signed/voted on the Civil Rights Act of 1964. Much of the Libertarian audience opposes the bill because of its contents on private discrimination. He was also booed for supporting drivers' licenses.

== Vice-presidential debates ==
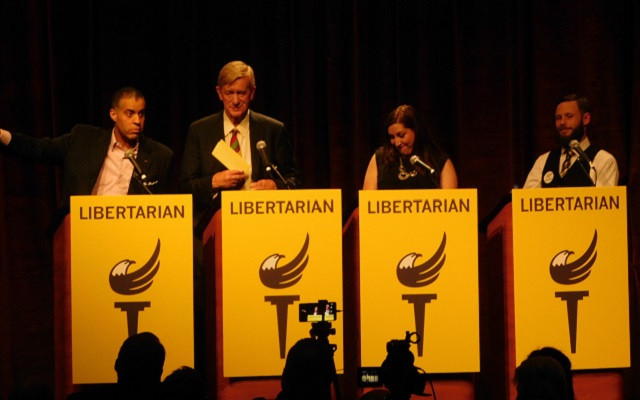
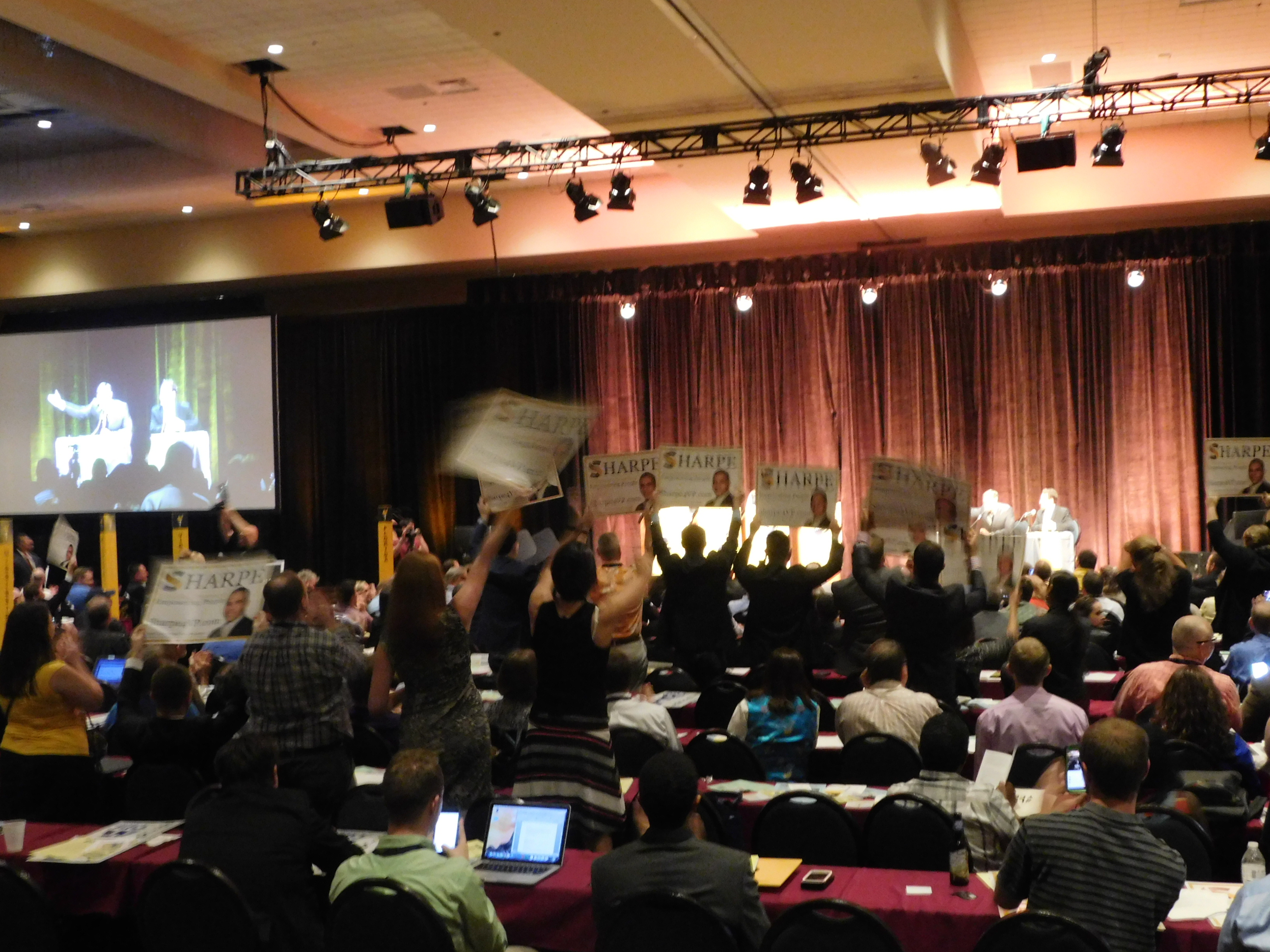
Images of the main vice presidential debate at the Libertarian National Convention on May 27

=== May 17 – Freedom Gulch ===
On May 17, Freedom Gulch hosted a Libertarian vice-presidential debate on Google Hangouts featuring the candidates: Will Coley, Alicia Dearn, Larry Sharpe, and Judd Weiss. This occurred before Gary Johnson announced William Weld as his vice-presidential pick.

=== May 26 and 27 – Orlando – Libertarian National Convention ===
On May 26, at the Libertarian National Convention, the vice-presidential candidates held a preliminary debate after the preliminary presidential debate. It was a two-tiered debate, with the top tier featuring candidates William Weld, Will Coley, Larry Sharpe, Alicia Dearn, and Judd Weiss. The next day on May 27, the vice-presidential candidates had their main debate, featuring Weld, Coley, Sharpe, and Dearn.

== Post-convention town halls and forums ==
=== June 22 – New York – CNN ===
On June 22, CNN hosted a Libertarian prime time town hall with Libertarian nominees Gary Johnson and William Weld. It was held at CNN's headquarters, inside the Time Warner Center in New York City. The town hall was moderated by Chris Cuomo. Over 900,000 people watched the broadcast.

=== August 3 – CNN ===
CNN again hosted a Libertarian town hall, on August 3, featuring Gary Johnson and Bill Weld, this time moderated by Anderson Cooper. The town hall was viewed by more than 1.6 million viewers and helped lead the network to a cable news first-place rating in the 18-49 category, scoring a 0.5.

=== August 12 – Las Vegas – AAJA Presidential Election Forum ===
On August 12, Gary Johnson participated in a Presidential Election Forum at Caesars Palace in Las Vegas during the Asian American Journalists Association's annual conference. Former president Bill Clinton was also a participant, representing his wife, Democratic nominee Hillary Clinton.

=== August 17 – Fusion Libertarian Forum ===
On August 17, Fusion hosted a forum featuring Johnson and Weld and was moderated by Jorge Ramos and Alicia Menendez.

=== August 26 – New York – Fox Business Network ===
On August 26, the Fox Business Network aired a town hall featuring Gary Johnson and William Weld and hosted by John Stossel.

=== September 12 – Philadelphia – Sirius XM ===
On September 12, Gary Johnson and William Weld participated in a town hall at the National Constitution Center in Philadelphia, moderated by Michael Smerconish and broadcast on the Sirius XM channel P.O.T.U.S.

=== September 13 – Purdue University ===
On September 13, Gary Johnson participated in a discussion at Purdue University hosted by Purdue president and former Indiana governor Mitch Daniels.

=== September 28 – University of New Hampshire – MSNBC ===
On September 28, MSNBC aired a town hall featuring Gary Johnson and William Weld, moderated by Chris Matthews and taking place at the University of New Hampshire.
