= William Loeb =

William Loeb may refer to:

- William Loeb Jr. (1866–1937), American political figure, secretary to President Theodore Roosevelt
- William Loeb III (1905–1981), American publisher of the conservative Union Leader newspaper in New Hampshire

== See also ==
- Bill Loebs, comic-book writer
