= Landrigan =

Landrigan is a surname. Notable people with the surname include:

- Jim Landrigan (1923–1974), American football player
- Kevin Landrigan (fl. 2014), American journalist
- Philip J. Landrigan (born 1942), American epidemiologist and pediatrician
