= Skol Company =

20th-century American manufacturer of sun protection products

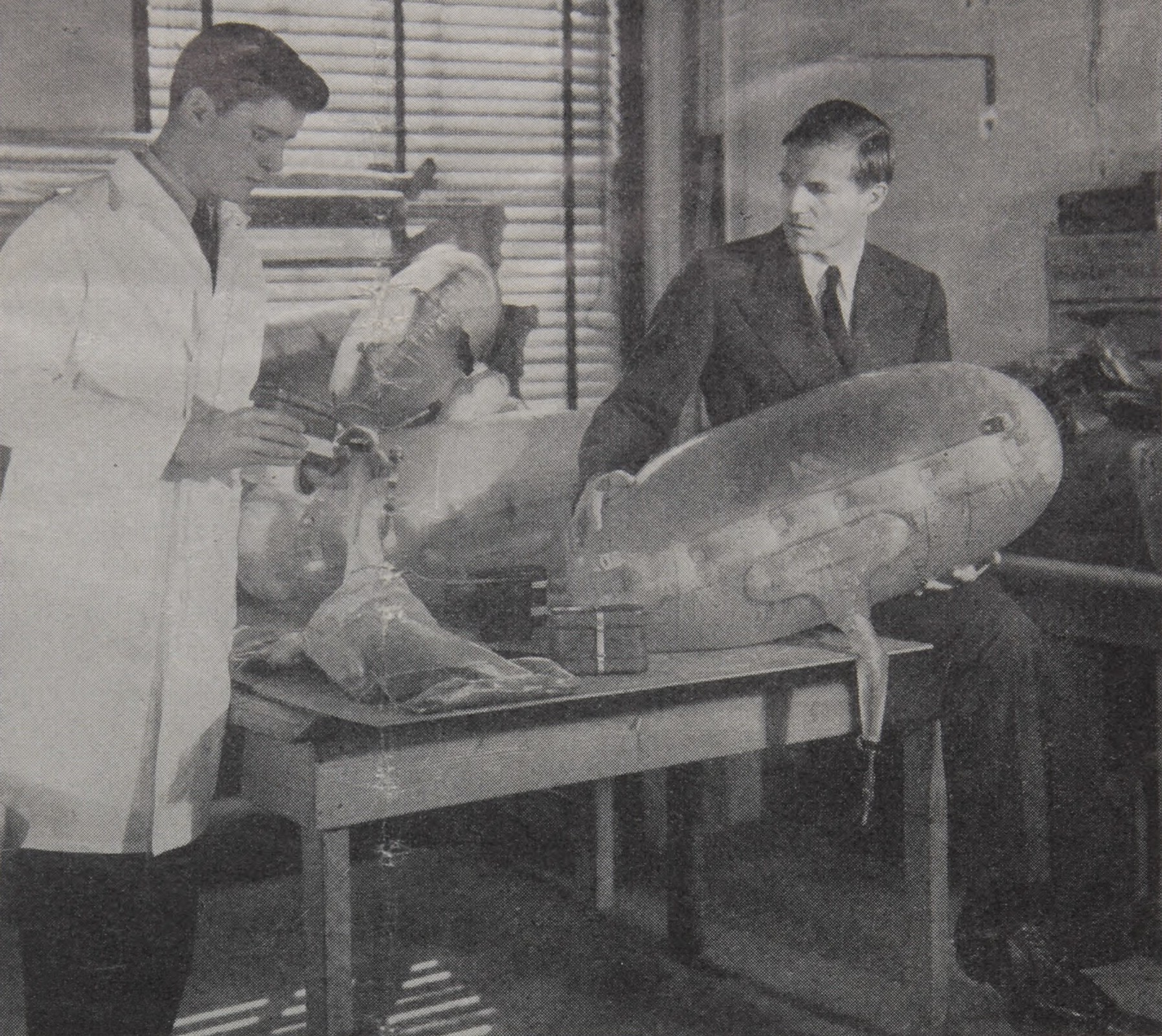
Bill Miller and George Gallowhur with Sunstill

The Skol Company produced Skol antiseptic for sunburn and Skol sunglasses from the 1920s through the mid-1940s. Based in New York City, their products were available in the United States and Canada. George Gallowhur (Note: Gallowhur was the first husband of Elizabeth Scripps, better known as Nackey Loeb via her second marriage, to newspaper publisher William Loeb III.) was president of the business. He developed Skol suntan lotion in the Austrian Alps in the 1920s. He also introduced Skat insect repellent.

In April 1938, the firm signed a five-year contract with the J. Walter Thompson Company for car-card advertising. The following month the Skol Company launched a nationwide campaign to promote Skol sunglasses, utilizing newspapers throughout the United States.

== Merger and sale ==
On November 6, 1946, the Skol Company merged with the Gallowhur Chemical Company. Gallowhur maintained his titles as president and treasurer. The Skol business was sold to the J.B. Williams Company in 1948.

Gallowhur died at the age of 69 at the Miami Heart Institute in Miami, Florida, in March 1974.
