= Nackey Loeb =

American newspaper publisher

- Born: Elizabeth Anne Scripps; February 24, 1924; Los Angeles, California, U.S.
- Died: January 8, 2000 (aged 75); Goffstown, New Hampshire, U.S.
- Other names: Elizabeth Scripps-Gallowhur; Nackey S. Loeb
- Education: Francis Parker School (San Diego)
- Alma mater: Scripps College
- Occupation: Newspaper publisher
- Years active: 1981–1999
- Known for: Publisher of the Manchester Union Leader
- Spouses: George Gallowhur (m. 1944; div. 1949); William Loeb III (m. 1952; died 1981)
- Children: 2
- Relatives: E. W. Scripps (grandfather)

Elizabeth Scripps "Nackey" Loeb (February 24, 1924 – January 8, 2000) was an American newspaper publisher. Her paternal grandfather was the namesake of the E. W. Scripps Company. Her second husband, William Loeb III, was publisher of the Manchester Union Leader newspaper of Manchester, New Hampshire, for 35 years. Upon his death in 1981, Nackey Loeb became publisher and served in that role until 1999.

== Biography ==
Nackey Loeb was born in Los Angeles on February 24, 1924, as Elizabeth Anne Scripps. Her parents were Robert Paine Scripps and Margaret Lou Culbertson. She was always known as Nackey, a name "given to generations of Scripps women". Her paternal grandfather, newspaper titan E. W. Scripps, founded the E. W. Scripps Company. Her father died in 1938, shortly after her 14th birthday. She attended Francis Parker School in San Diego, then Scripps College, which had been founded by her great-aunt, Ellen Browning Scripps.

In 1944, Nackey (Note: Due to surname changes over time, "Nackey" is used for clarity in this article.) married George Gallowhur; inventor of Skol suntan lotion. The couple (she used Scripps-Gallowhur as her last name) had one daughter; they divorced in November 1949.

In 1952, Nackey married William Loeb III, (Note: In August 1949, Loeb had been sued by Gallowhur for having "alienated the affection" of Nackey.) a conservative newspaper publisher who had bought the Manchester Union Leader of Manchester, New Hampshire, in the years after World War II. The Loebs had one daughter, Edith Tomasko, who died in 2014.

In December 1977, Nackey suffered spinal damage and was paralyzed from the waist down in a car accident outside of Reno, Nevada, after the car her husband was driving skidded off the road due to ice and flipped over. In 1984, President Ronald Reagan appointed her to the Architectural and Transportation Barriers Compliance Board.

Nackey helped her husband run the Union Leader for decades until his death in 1981. She then succeeded him as publisher, and served until that role until stepping down in May 1999, shortly before her death. She died on January 8, 2000, at her home in Goffstown, New Hampshire.

== Legacy ==
In 1999, she founded the Nackey S. Loeb School of Communications, a private non-profit school. Annually, the school issues a First Amendment Award. The organization retained majority ownership of the Union Leader newspaper until January 2025.

On May 1, 2022, Nackey's daughter from her marriage to George Gallowhur—Nackey E. Gallowhur-Scagliotti—accused her stepfather, William Loeb, of sexually molesting her when she was 7 years old. The Union Leader denounced William Loeb and removed his name from their masthead in response to the accusations.
