= 2004 Democratic Party presidential debates and forums =

Debates and forums took place between candidates in the campaign for the Democratic Party's nomination for the president of the United States in the 2004 presidential election. The Democratic National Committee sanctioned 6 debates out of 16 total.

== Candidates in debate ==
Ten major Democratic candidates participated in the debates:

- Retired General Wesley Clark
- Former Governor Howard Dean
- Senator John Edwards
- Congressman Dick Gephardt
- Senator Bob Graham
- Senator John Kerry
- Congressman Dennis Kucinich
- Senator Joe Lieberman
- Former Senator and Ambassador Carol Moseley Braun
- Reverend Al Sharpton

== Debate table ==
Key: P denotes candidate participated in debate; N denotes candidate was not invited; A denotes candidate absent but was invited; O denotes candidate was out of the race.

Debates among candidates for the 2004 Democratic Party U.S. presidential nomination
Details				Invitees									
No.	Date	Place	Broadcast	Clark	Dean	Edwards	Gephardt	Graham	Kerry	Kucinich	Lieberman	Moseley Braun	Sharpton
1	May 3, 2003	Columbia, SC	ABC	O	P	P	P	P	P	P	P	P	P
2	September 4, 2003	Albuquerque, NM	PBS & Univision	O	P	P	P	P	P	P	P	P	A
3	September 9, 2003	Baltimore, MD	Fox News	O	P	P	P	P	P	P	P	P	P
4	September 25, 2003	New York, NY	CNBC	P	P	P	P	P	P	P	P	P	P
5	October 9, 2003	Phoenix, AZ	CNN	P	P	P	P	O	P	P	P	P	P
6	October 26, 2003	Detroit, MI	Fox News	P	P	P	P	O	P	P	P	P	P
7	November 24, 2003	Des Moines, IA	MSNBC	P	P	P	P	O	P	P	N	P	P
8	December 9, 2003	Durham, NH	ABC	P	P	P	P	O	P	P	P	P	P
9	January 4, 2004	Johnston, IA	PBS	A	P	P	P	O	P	P	P	P	A
10	January 6, 2004	Des Moines, IA	NPR (radio only)	A	P	A	P	O	P	P	P	P	A
11	January 11, 2004	Des Moines, IA	MSNBC	A	P	P	P	O	P	P	P	P	P
12	January 22, 2004	Goffstown, NH	Fox News	P	P	P	O	O	P	P	P	O	P
13	January 29, 2004	Greenville, SC	MSNBC	P	P	P	O	O	P	P	P	O	P
14	February 15, 2004	Milwaukee, WI	MSNBC	O	P	P	O	O	P	P	O	O	P
15	February 26, 2004	Los Angeles, CA	CNN	O	O	P	O	O	P	P	O	O	P
16	February 29, 2004	New York, NY	CBS	O	O	P	O	O	P	P	O	O	P

== Debates ==
=== May 3, 2003 – Columbia, South Carolina ===
The first debate was held at Drayton Hall Theatre at the University of South Carolina in Columbia, South Carolina on May 3, 2003 at 9 p.m. EDT. It was sponsored by ABC News and the South Carolina Democratic Party and moderated by George Stephanopoulos of ABC News. It was the earliest formal debate in presidential campaign history.

Video on C-SPAN

=== September 4, 2003 – Albuquerque, New Mexico ===
The second debate overall, and the first sanctioned by the DNC, was held at Popejoy Hall at the University of New Mexico in Albuquerque, New Mexico on September 4, 2003 at 6 p.m. MDT. It was sponsored by PBS, Univision and moderated by María Elena Salinas of Univision and Ray Suarez of PBS and hosted by Governor Bill Richardson and the Congressional Hispanic Caucus. This was the first ever primary debate simulcast in both English and Spanish.

Video on C-SPAN

=== September 9, 2003 – Baltimore, Maryland ===
The third debate was held at Gilliam Concert Hall, Murphy Fine Arts Center at Morgan State University in Baltimore, Maryland on September 9, 2003. Sponsored by the Congressional Black Caucus Institute and Fox News, it was moderated by Brit Hume, joined by Farai Chideya, Ed Gordon and Juan Williams, with an introduction by Congressman Elijah Cummings.

Video on C-SPAN

Transcript from The Washington Post

=== September 25, 2003 – New York, New York ===
The fourth debate overall, and the second sanctioned by the DNC, was held at Pace University in New York, New York on September 25, 2003 at 4 p.m. EDT. Sponsored by CNBC and The Wall Street Journal, it was moderated by Brian Williams of NBC, joined by Gerald Seib of The Wall Street Journal, Ron Insana of CNBC and Gloria Borger of CNBC. This was the only debate to feature all 10 candidates.

Video on C-SPAN

=== October 9, 2003 – Phoenix, Arizona ===
The fifth debate overall, and the third sanctioned by the DNC, was held at the Orpheum Theatre in Phoenix, Arizona on October 9, 2003 at 5 p.m. MST. Sponsored by CNN and the Arizona Democratic Party, it was moderated by Judy Woodruff, joined by Jeff Greenfield and Candy Crowley, with an introduction by Governor Janet Napolitano.

Video on C-SPAN

Transcript from CNN

=== October 26, 2003 – Detroit, Michigan ===
The sixth debate overall, and the fourth sanctioned by the DNC, was held at Fox Theatre in Detroit, Michigan on October 26, 2003. Sponsored by the Congressional Black Caucus Institute and Fox News, it was moderated by Gwen Ifill of PBS, joined by Carl Cameron of Fox News and Huel Perkins of WJBK, with an introduction by Congresswoman Carolyn Cheeks Kilpatrick.

Video on C-SPAN

=== November 24, 2003 – Des Moines, Iowa ===
The seventh debate overall, and the fifth sanctioned by the DNC, was held at the Polk County Convention Center in Des Moines, Iowa on November 24, 2003. Sponsored by MSNBC, it was moderated by Tom Brokaw of NBC. Senators John Kerry and John Edwards appeared by satellite from studios in Washington, D.C. due to debate on final passage of the Medicare Prescription Drug, Improvement, and Modernization Act. Senator Joe Lieberman initially declined to attend because he was not competing in the Iowa Caucuses, then asked to participate by satellite as well, but was not allowed.

Transcript from The New York Times

=== December 9, 2003 – Durham, New Hampshire ===
The eighth debate overall, and the sixth and final debate sanctioned by the DNC, was held at Johnson Theatre at the University of New Hampshire in Durham, New Hampshire on December 9, 2003 at 7:00 p.m. EST. Sponsored by WMUR-TV and ABC News, it was moderated by Ted Koppel, joined by Scott Spradling of WMUR-TV.

Video on C-SPAN

=== January 4, 2004 – Johnston, Iowa ===
The ninth debate was held at the Maytag Auditorium at Iowa Public Television in Johnston, Iowa on January 4, 2004 at 2 p.m. CST. Sponsored by The Des Moines Register and PBS, it was moderated by Paul Anger of The Des Moines Register, joined by David Yepsen and Michele Norris of NPR.

Video on C-SPAN

Transcript from CNN

=== January 6, 2004 – Des Moines, Iowa ===
The tenth debate was held in Des Moines, Iowa on January 6, 2004. Sponsored by NPR News and WOI Radio Group, it was moderated by Neal Conan. It was the first radio-only debate since Republicans Thomas Dewey and Harold Stassen debated before the 1948 Oregon primary.

=== January 11, 2004 – Des Moines, Iowa ===
The eleventh debate was held at Polk County Convention Center in Des Moines, Iowa on January 11, 2004. Sponsored by the Iowa Brown & Black Presidential Forum and MSNBC, it was moderated by Lester Holt and María Celeste Arrarás.

Video on C-SPAN

=== January 22, 2004 – Goffstown, New Hampshire ===
The twelfth debate was held at Koonz Auditorium at Saint Anselm College in Goffstown, New Hampshire on January 22, 2004. Sponsored by WMUR-TV, New Hampshire Union Leader and Fox News, it was moderated by Brit Hume, joined by Tom Griffith of WMUR-TV, John DiStaso of the New Hampshire Union Leader, and Peter Jennings of ABC.

=== January 29, 2004 – Greenville, South Carolina ===
The thirteenth debate was held at the Peace Center at Furman University in Greenville, South Carolina on January 29, 2004. Sponsored by MSNBC, Young Democrats of South Carolina and Furman University, it was moderated by Tom Brokaw of NBC. The contenders attacked President Bush on Iraq, terrorism and the economy.

Video on C-SPAN

=== February 15, 2004 – Milwaukee, Wisconsin ===
The fourteenth debate was held at Alumni Memorial Union at Marquette University in Milwaukee, Wisconsin on February 15, 2004. Sponsored by Journal Communications, WTMJ-TV, the Milwaukee Journal Sentinel and MSNBC, it was moderated by Mike Gousha of WTMJ-TV, joined by Craig Gilbert of the Milwaukee Journal Sentinel, Gloria Borger of CNBC/U.S. News & World Report and Lester Holt of MSNBC.

=== February 26, 2004 – Los Angeles, California ===
The fifteenth debate was held at Bovard Auditorium at the University of Southern California in Los Angeles, California on February 26, 2004 at 6:00 p.m. PST. Sponsored by CNN and the Los Angeles Times, it was moderated by Larry King of CNN, joined by Janet Clayton and Ron Brownstein of the Los Angeles Times.

Video on C-SPAN

Transcript from The Los Angeles Times

=== February 29, 2004 – New York, New York ===
The sixteenth and final debate was held at the CBS Broadcast Center in New York, New York on February 29, 2004. Sponsored by CBS News, WCBS-TV, and The New York Times, it was moderated by Dan Rather, joined by Elisabeth Bumiller of The New York Times and Andrew Kirtzman of WCBS-TV. It was John Edwards' last chance to boost himself before the Super Tuesday primaries.

Video on C-SPAN

Transcript from The New York Times

== Forums ==
=== November 4, 2003 – Boston, Massachusetts ===
America Rocks the Vote was held at Faneuil Hall in Boston, Massachusetts on November 4, 2003. Sponsored by CNN and Rock the Vote, it was moderated by Anderson Cooper.
