= Cashman Center =

Multiuse complex in Las Vegas, Nevada

- Interactive map of Cashman Center
- Location: Las Vegas, Nevada
- Coordinates: 36.179952°N 115.131027°W

Construction
- Opened: 1948
- Closed: December 2017

The Cashman Center or the Cashman Field Center is a 483,000 sq ft (44,900 m^{2}) complex on a 55 acres (22 ha) site in Las Vegas, Nevada. Operated by the City of Las Vegas, it includes Cashman Field and a permanently closed 98,100 sq ft (9,110 m^{2}) convention center. The center was mostly used for local events, but did host national events throughout the years, including the second 2008 Democratic presidential debate, the 1986 American Bowling Congress National Bowling Tournament, and the 2008-09 United States Bowling Congress Open Championships.

== History ==
The center opened in 1948. The convention center closed in 2017. The final event was the Moscow Ballet in December 2017. The convention center will be replaced by a larger downtown expo center.

The adjacent field complex remains open and in use. During the COVID-19 pandemic, the parking lot was painted with spaces six feet apart to enforce social distancing among the homeless people that were sleeping there while a shelter was being cleaned after an infected person had been at the facility.
