= Kevin Landrigan =

American journalist

Kevin Landrigan is an American journalist.

Landrigan began his career at the Nashua Telegraph, where he spent 27 years as a state politics reporter. He later moved to New Hampshire 1 News, and then the New Hampshire Union Leader where he was chief of the Union Leader's state house bureau. He has also been a contributor to PolitiFact.

Landrigan has been described by Politico as "an institution in New Hampshire". He is the 2019 recipient of the Lifetime Achievement Award from the New Hampshire Press Association (NHPA) and his expose on allegations of sexual molestation by William Loeb III (1905–1981), longtime publisher of the Union Leader, received first place in the general news category in the 2023 NHPA annual journalism awards.
