= William Loeb Jr. =

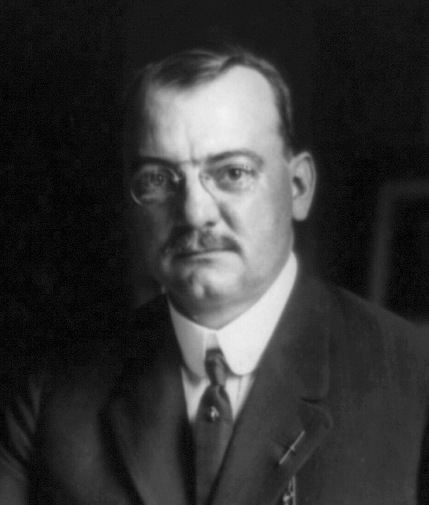
- William Loeb Jr. in 1910

Collector of the Port of New York
- In office 1909–1913
- Appointed by: William Howard Taft
- Preceded by: Edward S. Fowler
- Succeeded by: John Purroy Mitchel

Secretary to the President
- In office February 18, 1903 – March 4, 1909
- President: Theodore Roosevelt
- Preceded by: George B. Cortelyou
- Succeeded by: Fred W. Carpenter

Personal details
- Born: October 9, 1866; Albany, New York, U.S.
- Died: September 19, 1937 (aged 70); Glen Cove, New York, U.S.
- Political party: Republican
- Relatives: William Loeb III (son)

William Loeb Jr. (October 9, 1866 – September 19, 1937) was an American political figure. He was the Presidential secretary to President Theodore Roosevelt and Collector of the Port of New York from 1909 to 1913. He was the father of William Loeb III, the conservative publisher of the Manchester Union Leader.

== Early life and career ==
William Loeb Jr. was born in Albany, New York. He was the son of Louisa (Meyer) and William Loeb, a barber. His father was a Prussian immigrant, and his mother was also of German origin. He attended the public schools of Albany and was a graduate of Albany High School. At the age of 12, he took his first job as secretary to Bishop William Croswell Doane, the first Bishop of Albany. He became a stenographer and court reporter and developed an interest in politics. Loeb served as secretary to the Republican county committee of Albany County and as vice president of the Unconditional Republican Club. In 1888, he was elected official stenographer of the New York State Assembly, and over the years, he gained political experience and acquaintances by serving as private secretaries to the Lieutenant-Governor, President pro tempore of the State Senate, Speaker of the Assembly; touting and touring the state for the 1891 campaign for Governor Jacob Sloat Fassett; and reporting on the debates of the 1894 New York State Constitutional Convention.

== Roosevelt's right-hand man ==
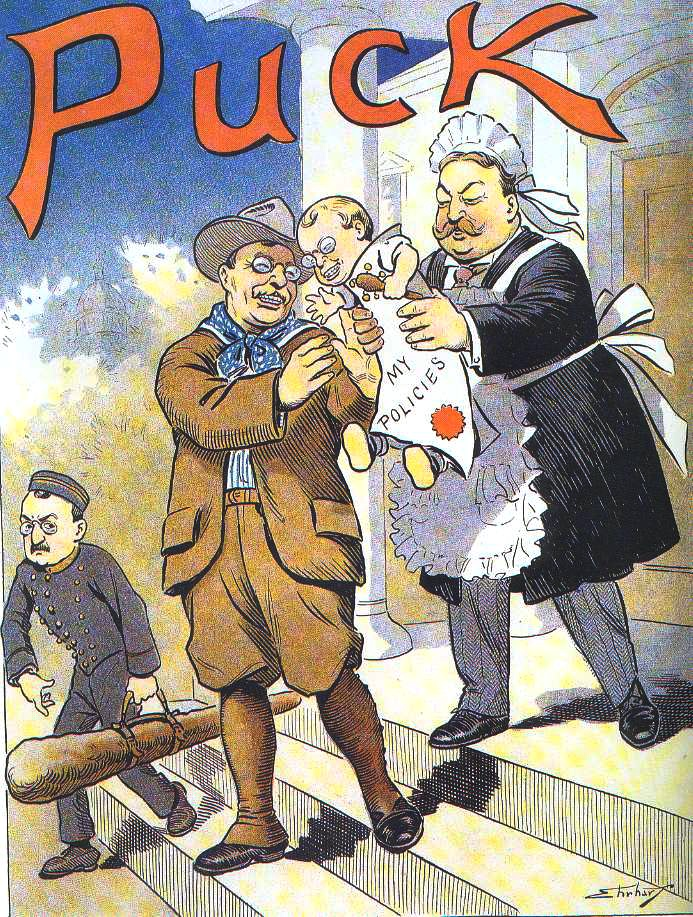
1909 cartoon: TR hands his policies to the care of Taft while William Loeb Jr. carries the "Big Stick"

When Theodore Roosevelt became Governor of New York he was appointed as one of his official stenographers. His ability to do things without specific instructions and his familiarity with public officials and affairs attracted Roosevelt's notice and Loeb became his private secretary in 1899.

On September 14, 1901, on the night President William McKinley died after being shot by an assassin eight days earlier, Loeb met Vice President Roosevelt during his dash to Buffalo at the North Creek, New York train station delivering the telegram from Secretary of State John Hay announcing McKinley's death at 2:15 that morning.

In the White House he served as assistant secretary to the President from 1901 to 1903, and then succeeded George B. Cortelyou as Secretary to the President in 1903 where he stayed by the President's side for the rest of Roosevelt's time in office.

Loeb was a very intimate aide to Roosevelt and was one of the era's most powerful figures. As Roosevelt's principal advisor he participated in shaping policy and solving political problems. Acting as the President's public alter-ego, he unofficially became the nation's first presidential press secretary, as Loeb was empowered to speak for the President and reporters were able to contact him twenty-four hours a day. Known to those in the press as "Stonewall Loeb", he controlled access to the President in an unprecedented fashion, dealing with the queries of most of the President's visitors without their ever having to disturb him.

When Roosevelt took to learning judo (then known as jiu-jitsu) from Yamashita Yoshitsugu in March and April 1904 and trained in the White House, Loeb and the President's Japanese naval attaché, Isamu Takeshita, were his training partners.

Roosevelt once described him as "The best secretary that any President ever had". In addition, in his own autobiography, Roosevelt stated that Loeb was responsible for starting the investigations into the frauds committed by the Sugar Trust in New York's Custom House.

He also played a part in aligning the 1908 Republican National Convention behind the nomination of William H. Taft. In January 1908 he brought it to the President's attention that there was no front-runner for the Republican nomination to succeed him and that many Republican leaders in the United States Congress were under the suspicion that Roosevelt had every intention of running for a third term. Loeb urged the President that he would only be able to sustain the credibility of his pledge not to run again by endorsing a candidate. Loeb told Roosevelt that any nominee could win if only he would back him. In response, Roosevelt said that he would favor Elihu Root and authorized Loeb at that moment to go to see Root and make the offer of his endorsement. Root, then Secretary of State, was astonished by the endorsement but did not accept it because he judged himself to be unelectable. Loeb reported back to the President that same day to report on his meeting. Roosevelt accepted Root's decision and told Loeb that his choice then was William Howard Taft, saying that he had the experience to run the government.

== Later life ==
From March 1909 to 1913, Loeb was appointed by President Taft as Collector of the Port of New York. He later went on to become Vice President of the American Smelting and Refining Company and retired to a quiet life in Oyster Bay where he lived with his wife and son, William Loeb III.

William Loeb Jr. died on 19 September 1937 in Glen Cove, Nassau County, New York, at age 70.

Government offices
Preceded by Edward S. Fowler	Collector of the Port of New York; 1909–1913	Succeeded by John Purroy Mitchel
