= Tom Fahey =

American journalist

Tom Fahey was the State House Bureau Chief of the New Hampshire Union Leader, for which he wrote the "State House Dome" column. He is a regular guest on New Hampshire Outlook on New Hampshire Public Television. He left that position in November 2011. http://www.unionleader.com/article/20111120/NEWS0604/711209971 He was one of the questioners during the 2002 Republican primary debate. Fahey was the questioner for the Democratic (June 3) and Republican (June 5) Debates on CNN and WMUR sponsored by the Union Leader.

He appeared on the June 3rd edition of Late Edition with Wolf Blitzer on CNN.

== See also ==
- New Hampshire State House press
