= New Hampshire Union Leader =

Daily newspaper from Manchester, New Hampshire, US

New Hampshire Union Leader New Hampshire Sunday News

- November 27, 2011 front page of the New Hampshire Sunday News, which is now the Saturday edition of the New Hampshire Union Leader
- Type: Daily newspaper
- Format: Broadsheet
- Owner: Union Leader Corp.
- Publisher: Brendan J. McQuaid
- Founded: 1863
- Headquarters: 200 Bedford Street; Manchester, NH 03108-9555; United States
- Circulation: 160,000 Average print circulation 4,000 Digital Subscribers
- ISSN: 0745-5798
- Website: UnionLeader.com

The New Hampshire Union Leader is a daily newspaper from Manchester, the largest city in the U.S. state of New Hampshire. On Saturdays, it is published as the New Hampshire Sunday News.

Founded in 1863, the paper was best known for the conservative political opinions of its late publisher, William Loeb, and his wife, Elizabeth Scripps "Nackey" Loeb, in the second half of the 20th century. Ownership of the paper passed from William Loeb to his wife upon his death, then to the Nackey S. Loeb School of Communications upon her death, until moving to private investors in January 2025.

Over the decades, the Loebs gained considerable influence and helped shape New Hampshire's political landscape. The paper helped to derail the candidacy of Maine U.S. Senator Edmund Muskie, who unsuccessfully sought the Democratic presidential nomination in 1972. Loeb criticized Muskie's wife, Jane, in editorials. When Muskie defended her in a press conference, there was a measured negative effect on voter perceptions of Muskie within New Hampshire.

== History ==
Like many newspapers, the Union Leader has a complex history involving mergers and buyouts.

The weekly Union became the Manchester Daily Union on March 31, 1863. The afternoon Union became a morning Daily Union (dropping the "Manchester"). Although the Union began as a Democratic paper, by the early 1910s it had been purchased by Londonderry politician Rosecrans Pillsbury, a Republican.

In October 1912, the competing Manchester Leader was founded by Frank Knox, later Secretary of the Navy during World War II, and financed by then-Governor Robert P. Bass, a member of the Progressive (or Bull Moose) Party who was attempting to promote the Progressive cause in New Hampshire. The newspaper was so successful that Knox bought out the Union, and the two newspapers merged under the banner of the Union-Leader Corporation in July 1913. Owing to Pillsbury's role in the company, both papers espoused a moderate Republican, pro-business stance.

Following Knox's death in 1944, William Loeb purchased the company, merging the Union and Leader into a single morning paper, the Manchester Union-Leader, in 1948. Under Loeb's leadership, the Union-Leader moved sharply to the right. He often placed editorials on the front page and supported highly conservative candidates for public office. He dropped Manchester from the paper's masthead in the mid-1970s to emphasize the fact that it was the only statewide newspaper in New Hampshire.

In 2000, after Nackey Loeb's death on January 8, Joseph McQuaid, the son and nephew of the founders of the New Hampshire Sunday News, Bernard J. and Elias McQuaid, took over as publisher. He was succeeded by his son, Brendan, in 2020.

On April 4, 2005, it changed its name to the New Hampshire Union Leader to reflect its statewide reach. However, it is still called the Manchester Union Leader by some residents due to its historical legacy.

The New Hampshire Sunday News was created in 1948 and later, after Loeb's attempts to start a Sunday edition of the Union-Leader failed, was purchased by the Union-Leader Corporation. The Union Leader published the Sunday News as its Sunday edition for decades but converted it to Saturday publication beginning February 10, 2024.

In January 2025, majority ownership of the paper moved from the Nackey S. Loeb School of Communications, a nonprofit organization, to two private investors.

Office of the Manchester Daily Union and its publisher Campbell & Hanscom, in 1877

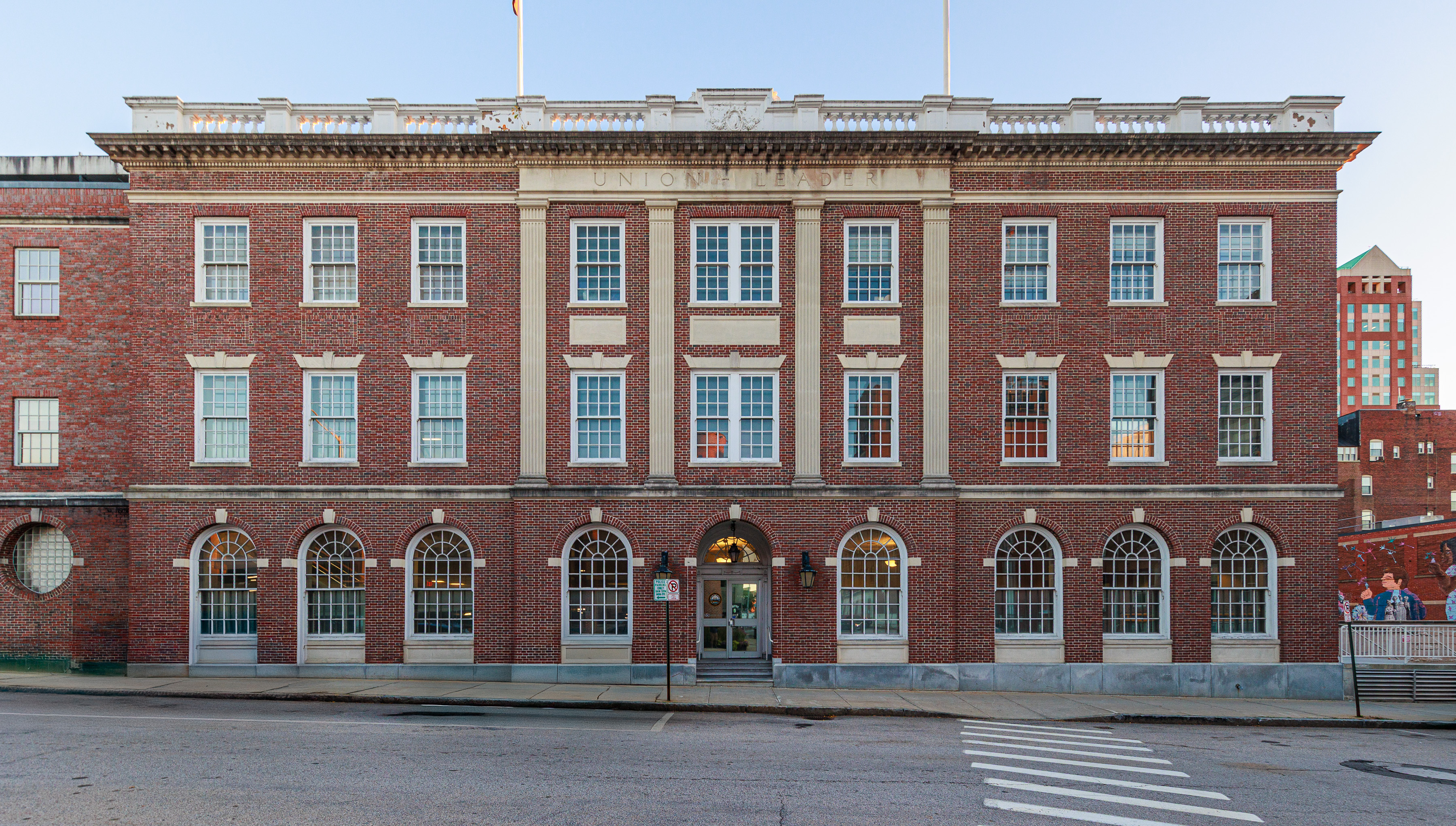
The downtown Union Leader building on Amherst Street was converted to the Manchester District Court c. 1996

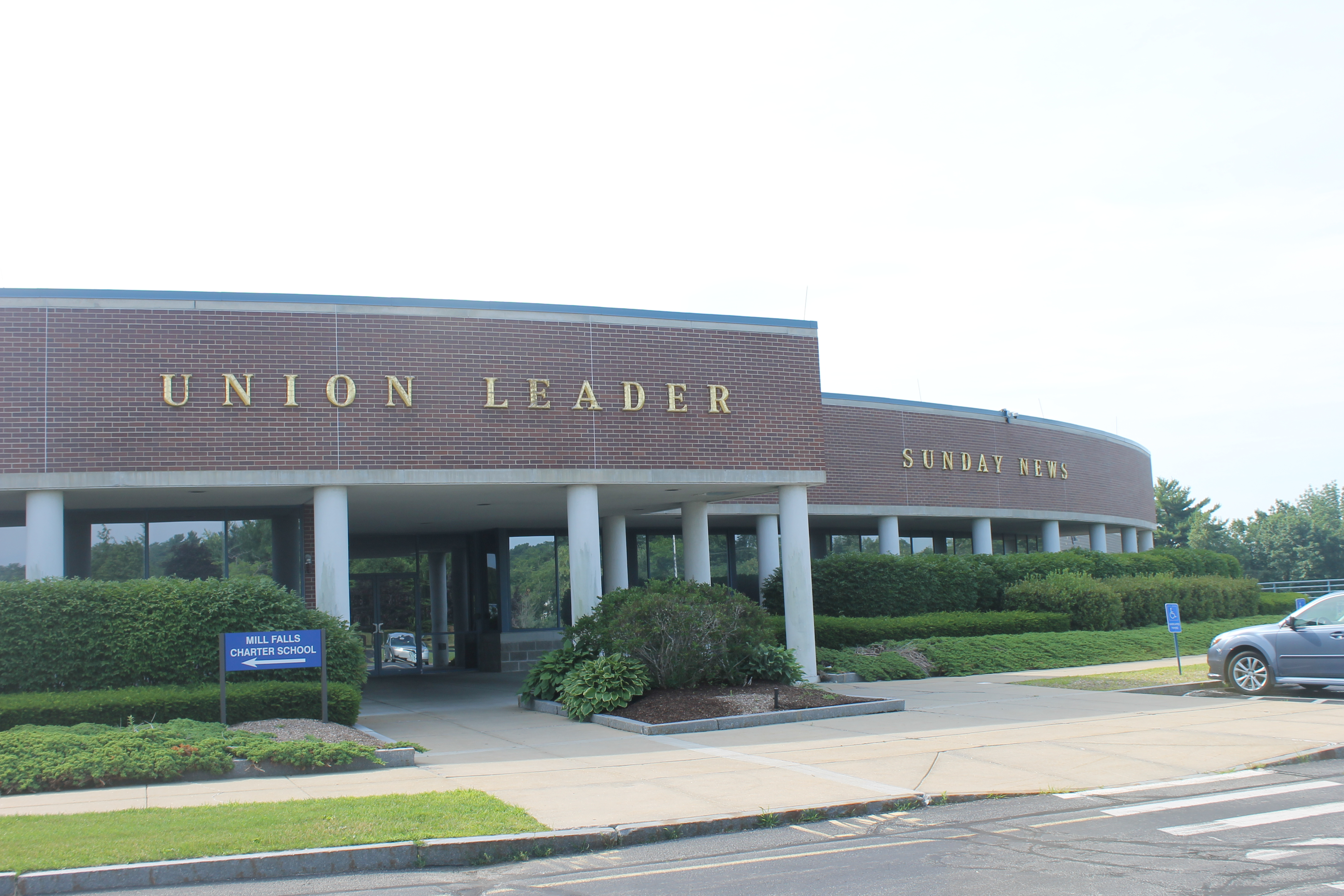
New Hampshire Union Leader building at 100 William Loeb Drive in Manchester, New Hampshire

== Contributors ==
- John DiStaso
- Tom Fahey
- Kevin Landrigan

Two notable early employees of the New Hampshire Sunday News were Ralph M. Blagden, the first managing editor, and Benjamin C. Bradlee, who was then a reporter. Bradlee later served as executive editor of The Washington Post for nearly 30 years and was its vice president until his death in 2014.

== Editorial style ==
Throughout its existence, the Union Leader and its predecessors have been closely involved in state politics and during the quadrennial United States presidential election, national politics. Until Trump, its orientation had been unyieldingly conservative (though the paper was already a reliable supporter of the GOP long before the Loebs bought it), a tradition that continued after McQuaid took over the paper. The paper's hard-hitting editorials, sometimes written by the publisher and featured on the front page, drew national attention and frequently prompted criticism:

The Manchester Union Leader, practitioner of a style of knife-and-kill journalism that went out of fashion half a century ago in the rest of the country, is the primary daily paper of 40 percent of New Hampshire's population...

— Theodore Harold White, The Making of the President, 1972

The Union Leader had endorsed Newt Gingrich in the 2012 New Hampshire Republican presidential primary, Chris Christie in the 2016 Republican Party presidential primaries, neither candidate won the primary.

In 2016, the Union Leader endorsed Libertarian candidate Gary Johnson for president—the first time in 100 years that the paper and its predecessors had not endorsed a Republican. The Union Leader remained a staunch opponent of Trump after his election.

After 2018, when the newspaper laid off its full-time editorial writer, the Union Leader's brash editorial tone softened.

In 2020, it endorsed Democratic candidate Joe Biden for president.

In 2024, publisher Brendan McQuaid announced that the paper would not endorse either "terrible" presidential candidate.

== Cutbacks and reduced circulation ==
In a message printed in the paper in early 2009, publisher Joseph McQuaid announced that owing to financial difficulties affecting the entire newspaper industry, the Saturday edition of the paper would no longer be distributed outside the Greater Manchester area and that Saturday content would be moved to a combined Friday/Saturday edition.

In 2015, the paper's flagship building at 100 William Loeb Drive was subdivided into parcels and offered for lease. In 2017, the Union Leader building was sold to investor Peter Levine for $3.8 million after being on the market for about four years. The newspaper leased back space to remain in the building at 100 William Loeb Drive. Three other tenants, two of them charter schools and a distributor, also were occupying space in the building at the time of the sale.

On February 4, 2024, publisher Brendan J. McQuaid announced that future New Hampshire Sunday News editions would be distributed on Saturdays due to changes affecting the news industry including a shortage of labor. McQuaid explained that mail subscribers could now receive the Sunday News on Saturdays.

After repeated rounds of layoffs over several years, the newspaper moved into smaller quarters in Manchester's downtown Millyard in the summer of 2024.

The newspaper said in 2011 that its daily circulation was 45,536, rising to 64,068 on Sundays.

In November 2024, New Hampshire Public Radio reported that the publisher said the Sunday circulation was about 20,000.

== See also ==
- Concord Monitor
- Foster's Daily Democrat
- The Keene Sentinel
- The Portsmouth Herald
- The Telegraph (Nashua)
