= William Loeb III =

American newspaper publisher

William Loeb
- Born: William Loeb III; December 26, 1905; Washington, D.C., U.S.
- Died: September 13, 1981 (aged 75); Burlington, Massachusetts, U.S.
- Education: Hotchkiss School
- Alma mater: Williams College
- Occupation: Newspaper publisher
- Years active: 1941–1981
- Known for: Conservative political views; publisher of the Manchester Union Leader
- Spouses: Elizabeth Nagy (m. 1926; div. 1932); Eleanore McAllister (m. 1942; div. 1952); Elizabeth Scripps-Gallowhur (m. 1952–1981)
- Children: 2
- Relatives: William Loeb Jr. (father)

William Loeb III (December 26, 1905 – September 13, 1981) was an American newspaper publisher. He is remembered for his unyieldingly conservative political views, which helped made the Manchester Union Leader of Manchester, New Hampshire, one of the best-known small papers in the country. The newspaper also benefited from nationwide attention every four years during the New Hampshire presidential primary. Loeb was publisher of the Union Leader from 1946 until his death, a period of 35 years.

== Biography ==
=== Early years ===
Loeb was born on December 26, 1905, in Washington, D.C., the son of Catharine/Katherine Wilhelmina (Dorr) and William Loeb Jr. (1866–1937). His parents were both of German descent. His father was executive secretary to Theodore Roosevelt, and a nationally known figure in his own day. Loeb's paternal grandfather, also named William Loeb, was a German immigrant. Loeb's siblings were Louisa Loeb-Neudorf, Amelia Olive Loeb and Lillian May Loeb.

The younger Loeb attended the Hotchkiss School and Williams College, and soon met and married Elizabeth Nagy, a faculty member at nearby Smith College. They were married on May 29, 1926. Nagy was eight years older than Loeb, and his parents objected to the matrimony. Loeb's father excluded him from his will in light of the marriage. The couple divorced six years later on October 11, 1932, and Loeb received alimony from Nagy for several years. Later in his life, Loeb made efforts to hide the marriage, and records of the divorce (Loeb v. Loeb F-3144) were found missing at the time they were to be archived on microfiche.

=== 1941–1948 ===
Loeb partnered with his friend Charlie Weaver to buy the St. Albans Messenger in St. Albans, Vermont, in 1941 to enter the publishing arena. Loeb also received cash investments from a woman named Marka Loening, who indulged in an extramarital affair with Loeb while waiting for her divorce from her estranged husband to be finalized. Loeb later used funding from Loening to buy the Burlington Daily News in 1942. One of Loeb's first infamous journalistic exploits was the publishing of his own baptismal certificate on the front page of both Vermont papers in an attempt to disprove rumors of his Jewish ancestry.

Loeb cited ulcers for his medical exemption from service during World War II, allegedly drinking large quantities of alcohol before doctor's visits to ensure flare-ups.

In 1946, Loeb secured funding from Ridder Publications to buy the Manchester Union and the Evening Leader from Annie Reid Knox, the widow of former Navy Secretary William Franklin Knox. Mrs. Knox later regretted the sale, claiming she had not seen how Loeb handled his Vermont newspapers, and claiming that Loeb did not mention the involvement of the Ridder family. Loeb used $250,000 ($4.13 million in 2025) in funding from his mother's accounts to fund the purchase of his share in the papers, and in 1948 used an additional $300,000 ($4.02 million in 2025) to buy out other shareholders and gain complete control of the papers, which he then merged into the Union Leader.

In 1947, Loeb brought in investor Leonard Finder as a business partner in the paper. Marka Loening, increasingly resentful of the presence of Scripps-Howard heiress Elizabeth "Nackey" Scripps-Gallowhur in the newspaper offices, withdrew her interests in Loeb's papers that same year. Loeb's mother had been under the impression that he and Loening were to be married, but discovered upon Loening's departure that Loeb had been secretly married to Vermont resident Eleanore McAllister since 1942. Afterwards, Loeb publicly disclosed the marriage in his papers, but claimed it had taken place in 1947 and not 1942.

Meanwhile, new competition emerged in Manchester with the return of Bernard J. "B.J." McQuaid, a former Manchester Union reporter under the tenure of Colonel Knox, from military service in Europe. McQuaid founded a rival paper, The New Hampshire Sunday News, with his brother, Elias. Loeb quickly wooed Bernard McQuaid over to the Union Leader, and bought the Sunday News outright in 1948. With no other statewide media (radio signals being blocked by mountains, and other papers only local to their towns), Loeb essentially gained a media monopoly in the state for himself. He tried, but failed, to win the license for the only television station licensed in the state, WMUR-TV.

Loeb's then-wife, Eleanore McAllister, gave birth to a daughter, Katharine Penelope, on October 29, 1948.

=== 1949–1952 ===
In 1949, Loeb used the additional $300,000 from his mother and cash from various state politicians he endorsed to buy out Leonard Finder. Also in 1949, Loeb founded the Vermont Sunday News, largely a copy of the New Hampshire edition's content.

On August 5, 1949, Loeb took Nackey Gallowhur to meet his mother in New York City. There, George Gallowhur, Nackey's husband, attempted to serve her divorce papers. Loeb refused to permit Gallowhur's agents from serving her, and he was jailed briefly for interfering. Gallowhur sued Loeb for alienation of affection in accordance with an old Vermont law. Mrs. Loeb, infuriated at her son's mistreatment of Eleanore McAllister, excluded him from her will and sued him for the $1 million ($13.5 million in 2025) in funding he had obtained from her to finance his acquisitions of the Union Leader in 1946 and 1949.

Also in 1949, Loeb became the third president of American China Policy Association (ACPA), an anti-communist organization that supported the government of Republic of China under Chiang Kai-shek.

Loeb continued to see Nackey. In 1949, he fired the print staff at his Vermont newspapers when they attempted to unionize. Nackey was initially placed in charge of printing, but the couple left Vermont in 1952 in the wake of his mother's lawsuit.

=== 1952–1966 ===
Loeb and Nackey Gallowhur moved to Reno, Nevada, where Loeb sued for divorce from Eleanore McAllister and then married Nackey. The Vermont papers flailed in the absence of Loeb's attention, and also suffered from negative reader and advertiser reaction to his opinionated absentee editorials. The Daily News ceased operations in 1959. Loeb did not visit the St. Albans paper offices again until 1973.

In 1950, Loeb repeated his baptismal certificate stunt, this time on the Union Leader front page. He again hoped to dispel gossip about his Jewish heritage, this time in the wake of controversy surrounding his political endorsements.

Loeb moved to Prides Crossing outside Beverly, Massachusetts, in 1955 to be closer to his New England newspaper operations. The Loeb's had one daughter, Edith Roosevelt, born in 1956.

In 1957, Loeb attempted to launch a paper in nearby Haverhill, the Haverhill Journal, but the publication proved to be a drain on the staff and presses shared with his other newspapers. The Journal folded in 1965, and Loeb blamed union activity for the closure. During a newspaper strike in Boston, he imported copies of the Union Leader into the city, but stopped after incorrect sports information in the publication led to threats from figures in the city's crime world. Loeb purchased the rights to the Connecticut Sunday Herald name (but not its presses), and relaunched it from Bridgeport, Connecticut, but once again his editorial stances alienated readers, and the paper closed.

Loeb's mother, Katherine Dorr-Loeb, died on November 24, 1966. Her will acknowledged Loeb's siblings, ex-wife Eleanore McAllister, and his daughter Katharine Penelope, but left him nothing. He filed suit, beginning a five-year legal battle that lasted through 1973 and rose to the Vermont Supreme Court, claiming that he had reconciled with his mother and that she had promised him 75 percent of her estate. He settled for less than 10 percent, after her estate had been drained of the bulk of its funds through his legal maneuvering. Loeb separated himself from his ex-wife and Katharine Penelope. When his daughter suffered a near-fatal injury in an equestrian accident the next year and lost a kidney, Loeb refused to speak to her.

William and Nackey Loeb used the Union Leader's pages to aggressively oppose the Civil Rights movement of the 1960s, champion racial segregation, and align with white supremacist groups. Their efforts included a long affiliation with the extremist John Birch Society, as well as the Mississippi White Citizens' Council, which used economic terrorism to fight racial integration. In private correspondence later revealed by historians, Loeb explicitly advocated what became known as the Republican Party's Southern strategy, calculating that even if Black voters defected to the Democrats "white people, thank God, are still in the majority". Loeb editorialized against Martin Luther King Jr., once famously referring to him as a "pious, pompous fraud". After Loeb's death, Nackey Loeb continued the Union Leader's opposition to civil rights and advocacy for King's legacy. In a front-page editorial on January 18, 1988, she criticized the federal holiday honoring King, falsely claiming he knowingly accepted Communist funds and that the holiday was "foisted on us by a loud gaggle of black extremists".

=== 1970s ===
In early 1972, Loeb attacked Edmund Muskie through the Union Leader, derailing the Maine senator's 1972 presidential bid. A letter to the editor, known as the Canuck letter, was published by the newspaper. Believed to be an act of political sabotage originating from within the Committee for the Re-Election of the President, the letter implied that Muskie was prejudiced against French-Canadians. Loeb also published an editorial previously issued by Newsweek that portrayed Muskie's wife, Jane, in an unfavorable light. Muskie's subsequent emotional defense of himself and his wife in front of the newspaper's offices in Manchester was seen as a sign of weakness and instability. Muskie later claimed that there were not tears in his eyes, as many papers reported, but rather melting snow, as it had been snowing during his speech. Regardless, the event had a negative impact on his campaign—in the view of reporter David S. Broder, "Muskie never recovered from that Saturday in the snow." In the same year, Loeb appeared at national leadership conferences of the Citizens' Councils.

Loeb's journalism résumé was the subject of skepticism in 1974, when he claimed in a front-page editorial to have worked for the Hearst conglomerate, as a reporter for the New York World for eight years before buying his St. Albans paper. The Hearst Corporation denied he had ever been employed there, and the World had actually ceased operations eight years before Loeb said he had started work there. Toledo Blade chairman Paul Block Jr. also denied ever seeing Loeb on the assignments he claimed to have worked.

Author Kevin Cash published a biography of Loeb entitled Who the Hell IS William Loeb? in 1975. Loeb's legal threats forced Cash to create his own publishing company, incorporated in Delaware, out of Loeb's reach. After four New Hampshire publishers balked at printing it, Cash had the book printed in Vermont. Loeb also gained infamy in the 1970s for attacking then-governor Walter R. Peterson Jr.'s teenage daughter for allegedly advocating the use of marijuana. She suffered an emotional breakdown as a result of the stress and public scrutiny thrust upon her in the wake of the allegations. Loeb was instrumental in the victory of Meldrim Thomson Jr., in the next gubernatorial election, and remained a political ally of Thomson's until Loeb's death.

In December 1977, Loeb was driving with his wife outside of Reno, Nevada, when the card skidded off the road due to ice and flipped over; Nackey Loeb suffered spinal damage and was paralyzed from the waist down.

Loeb died of cancer in September 1981 at the Lahey Clinic in Burlington, Massachusetts. He left control of the Union Leader to his wife. She remained as publisher until stepping down in May 1999; she died in January 2000. Control of the newspaper then fell to Bernard McQuaid's son, Joseph McQuaid.

== Legacy ==
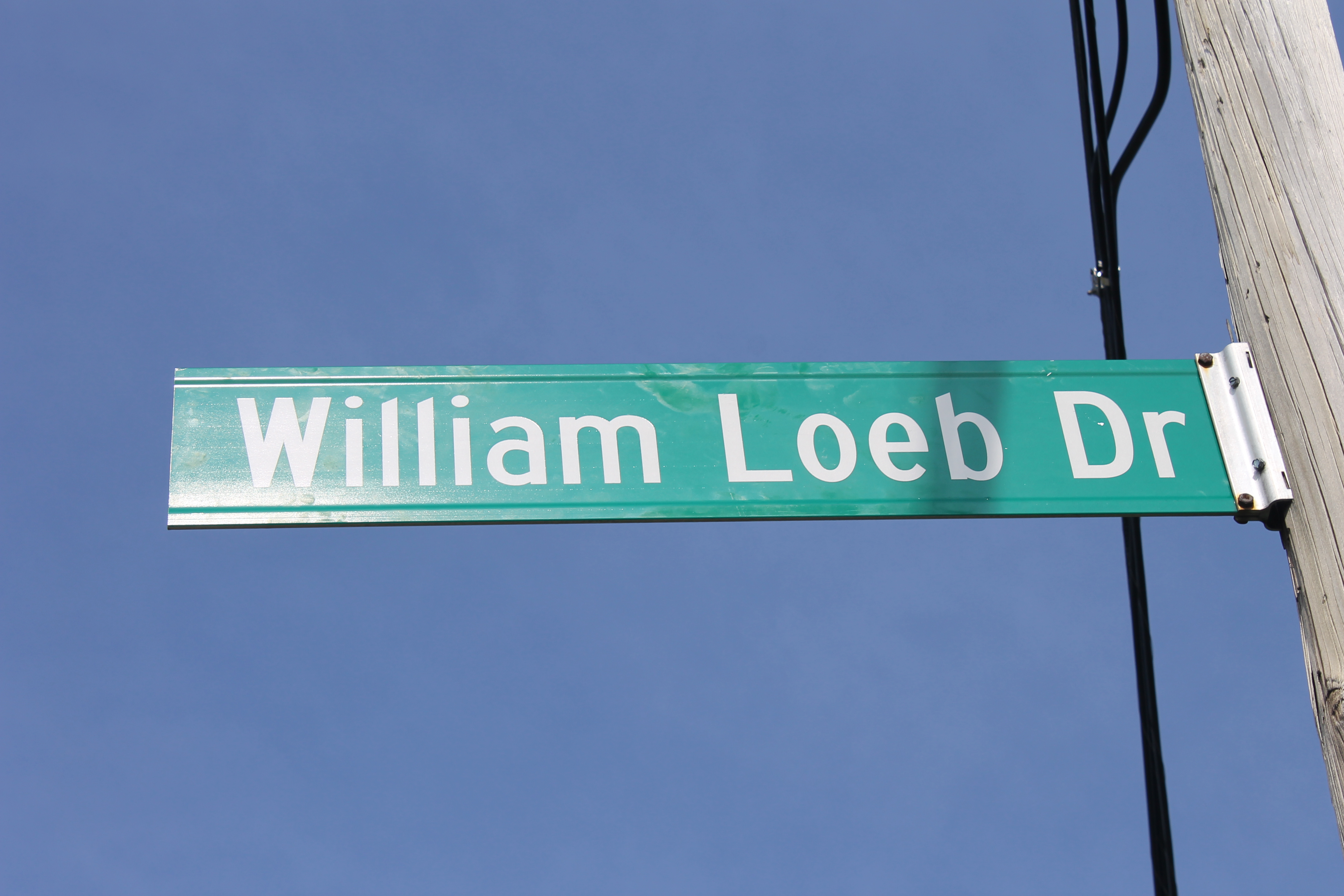
William Loeb Drive leads to the New Hampshire Union Leader physical plant and offices in Manchester, New Hampshire.

Loeb is best remembered for his unyielding conservatism. The Union Leader already tilted Republican editorially when he bought it, but veered sharply to the right after his purchase. Regardless, Loeb did not hesitate to castigate fellow Republicans, once writing: "This newspaper now solemnly charges that President Eisenhower has done more to destroy the respect, honor and power of the United States than any President in its history." Loeb also stood alone among conservatives in his staunch support for Jimmy Hoffa, despite otherwise being a foe of labor.

In New Hampshire, Loeb's major political legacy is an anti-tax pledge ("The Pledge") that has been taken not only by all Republicans seeking the gubernatorial nomination, but also by all Democrats who have successfully been elected.

On May 1, 2022, Loeb's stepdaughter—Nackey E. Gallowhur-Scagliotti, daughter of Nackey and George Gallowhur—accused him of sexually molesting her when she was 7 years old. The Union Leader denounced Loeb and removed his name from their masthead in response to the accusations.
