= Press secretary =

Person who provides advice on how to deal with the news media

A press secretary or press officer is a senior advisor who provides advice on how to deal with the news media and, using news management techniques, helps their employer to maintain a positive public image and avoid negative media coverage.

== Duties and functions ==
They often, but not always, act as the organization's senior spokesperson. Many governments also have deputy press secretaries. A deputy press secretary is typically a mid-level political staffer who assists the press secretary and communications director with aspects of public outreach. They often write the press releases and media advisories for review by the press secretary and communications director. There are usually assistant press secretaries and press officers that support the press secretary. Press secretaries also give declarations to the media when a particular event happens or an issue arises inside an organization. They are expected, therefore, to have in-depth knowledge about the institution or organization they represent, and to be able to explain and answer questions about the organization's policies, views upon a particular issue and its official standpoint on problematic questions.

== History ==
The role of the press officer originated in Europe in the 19th century, created by governments.

In the United States, Stephen T. Early, who worked for President Franklin D. Roosevelt, is credited as being America's first modern presidential press secretary.

== See also ==
- Attaché
- Chief Cabinet Secretary
- Downing Street Press Secretary
- Press service
- Spin doctor
- Spokesperson
- White House Press Secretary
- Kremlin Press Secretary
