= 2016 United States presidential debates =

Part of the 2016 U.S. presidential election

- September 26, 2016; October 9, 2016; October 19, 2016
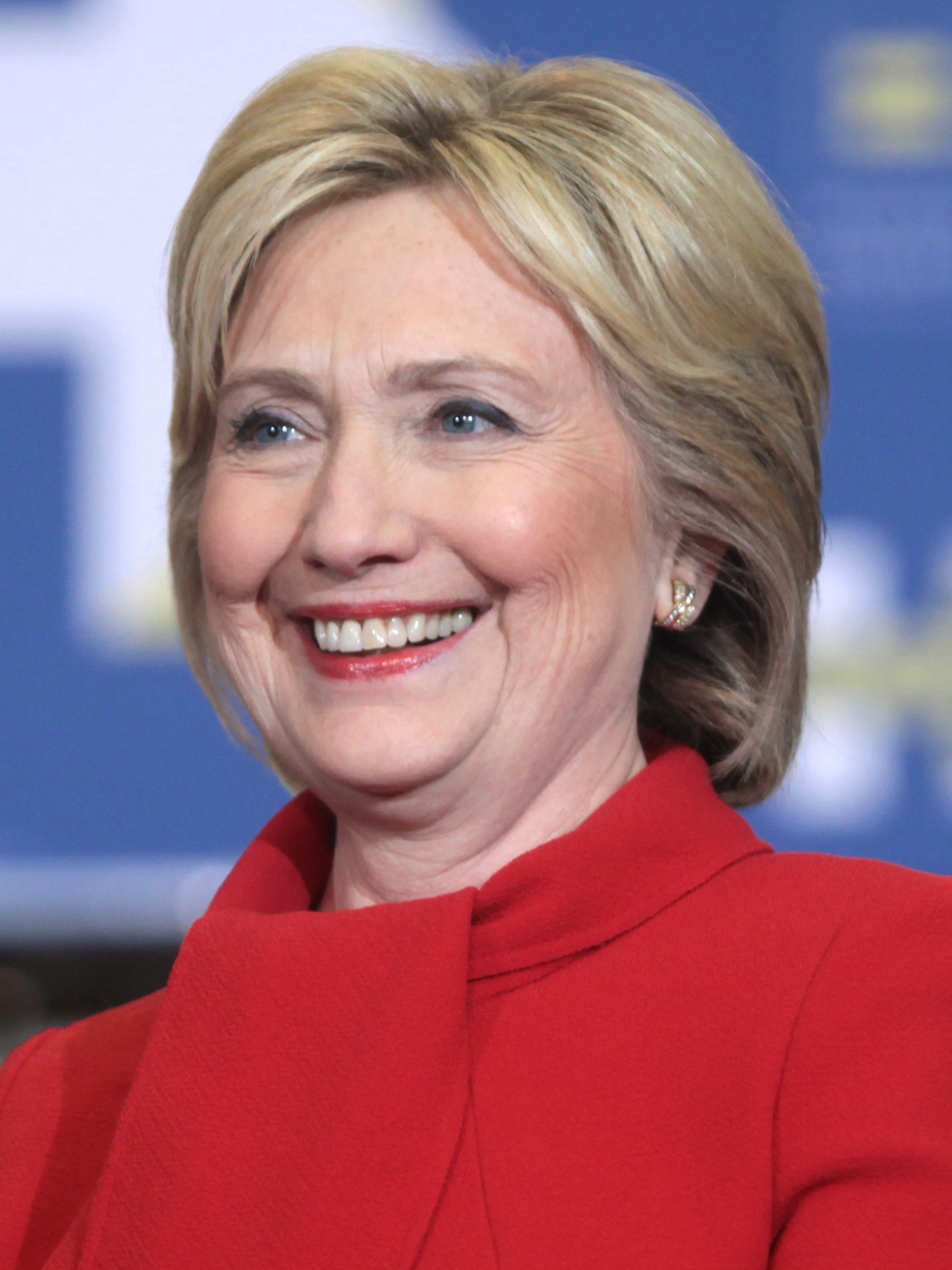

Nominee	Hillary Clinton	Donald Trump
Party	Democratic	Republican
Home state	New York	New York
- 2016 United States vice presidential debate
- October 4, 2016
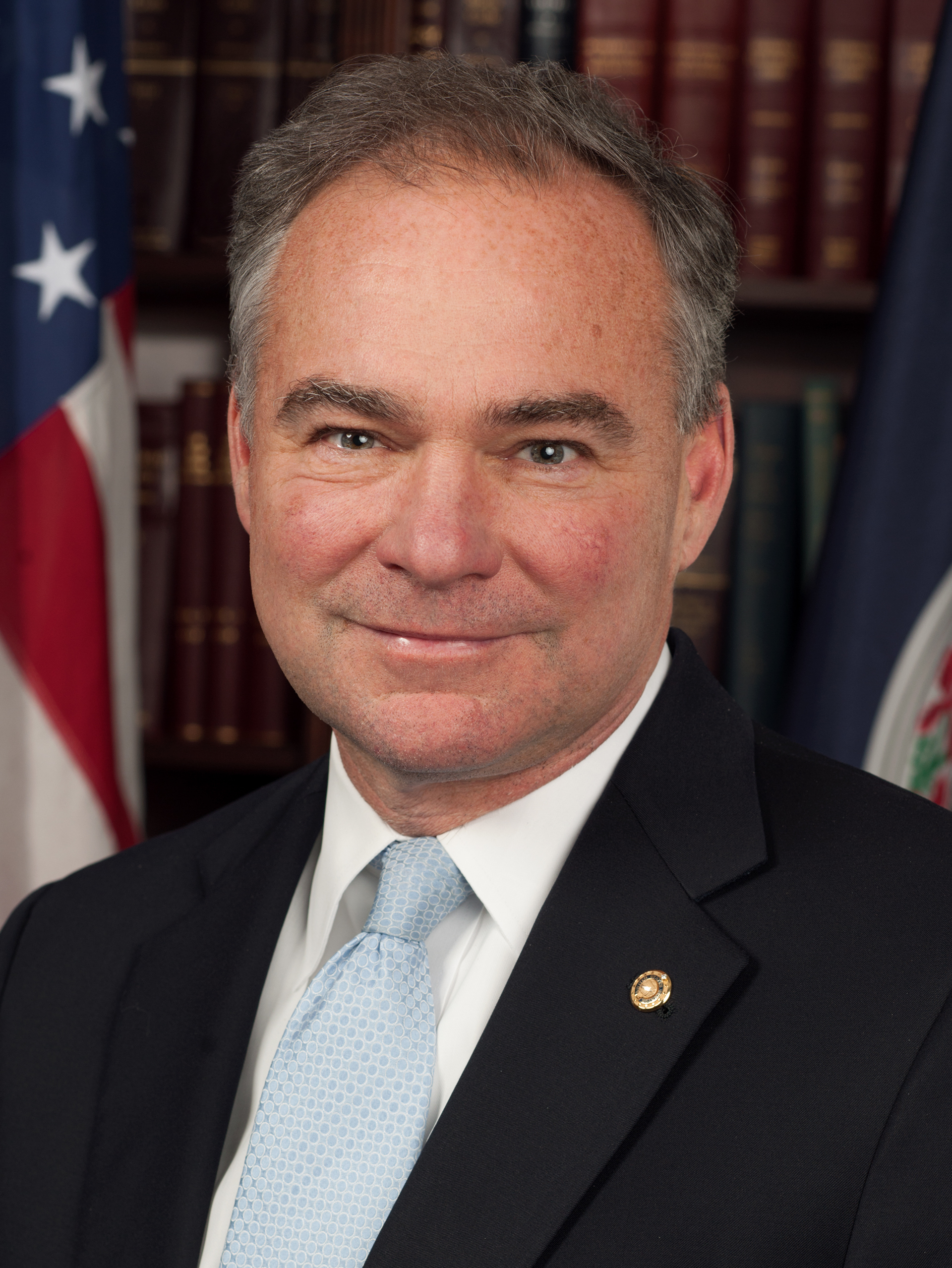

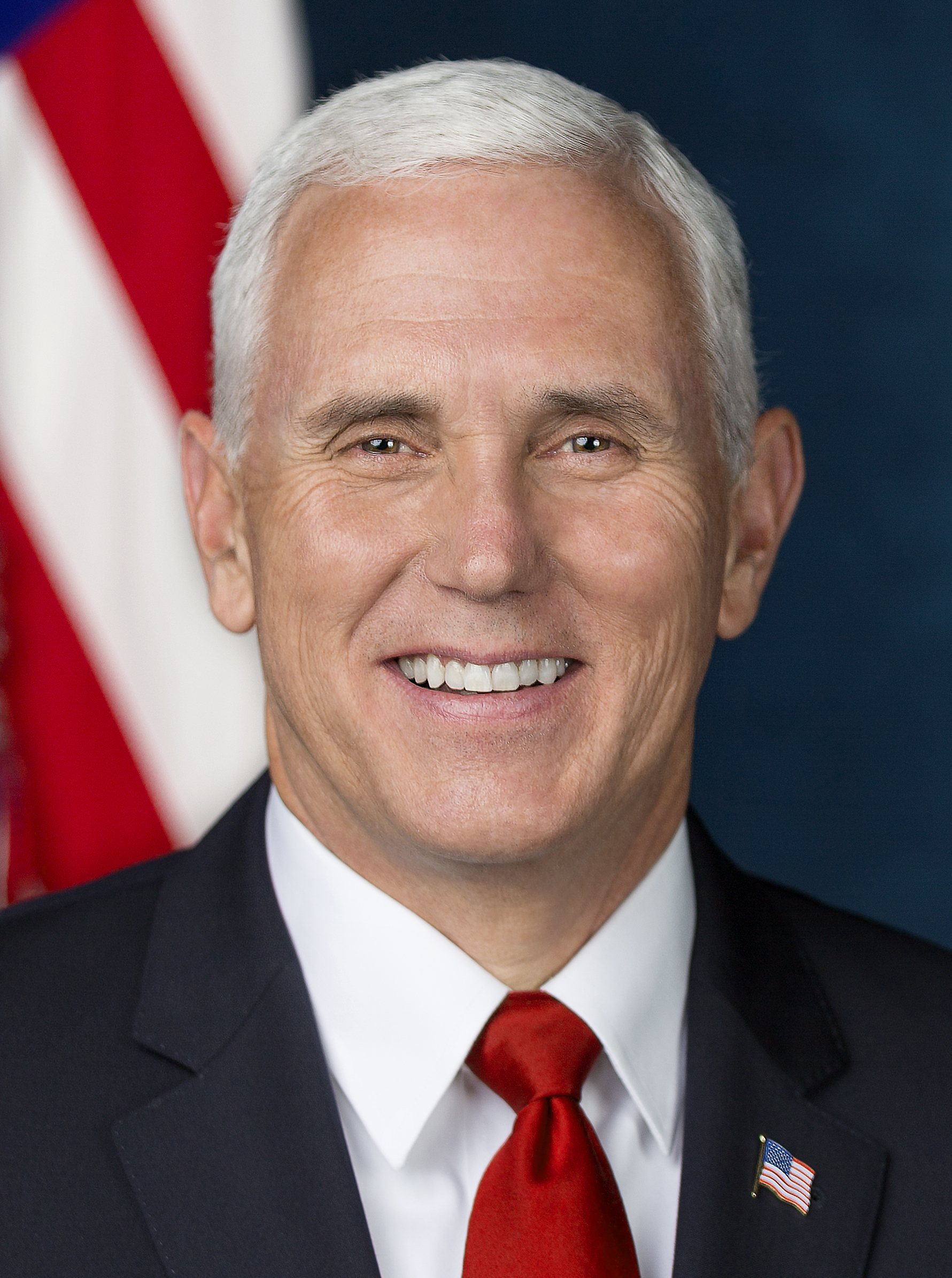
Nominee	Tim Kaine	Mike Pence
Party	Democratic	Republican
Home state	Virginia	Indiana

The 2016 United States presidential debates were a series of debates held during the 2016 presidential election.

The Commission on Presidential Debates (CPD), a bipartisan organization formed in 1987, organized four debates among the major party candidates, sponsored three presidential debates and one vice presidential debate. Only Democratic nominee Hillary Clinton and Republican nominee Donald Trump met the criteria for inclusion in the debates, and thus were the only two to appear in the debates sponsored by the Commission on Presidential Debates. The CPD-sponsored vice presidential debate took place between their respective vice presidential running mates, Tim Kaine and Mike Pence.

The first presidential debates took place on September 26, 2016, and set the record as the most-watched debate in American history, with 84 million viewers. The second presidential debate took place on October 9, 2016. The third and final presidential debate took place on October 19, 2016. Additionally, a vice presidential debate took place on October 4, 2016.

== Commission on Presidential Debates-sponsored debates ==
The Commission on Presidential Debates stipulates three criteria for eligibility for the presidential debates: constitutional eligibility to serve as president, appearance on enough ballots to potentially reach 270 electoral votes, and an average at least 15% on five selected national polls. For the vice-presidential debate, the running mates of the presidential candidates qualifying for the first presidential debate will be invited. By mid-September Hillary Clinton, Donald Trump, Gary Johnson, and Jill Stein were on enough ballots to reach 270 electoral votes; however, only Clinton and Trump had reached the 15% polling threshold. As of August 2016, Johnson and Stein had polled as high as 13% and 7%, respectively, and had an average of 8.3% and 3%, respectively.

On August 15, the CPD announced that it would use the most recent CBS/The New York Times, Fox News, CNN/Opinion Research Corporation, NBC/The Wall Street Journal, and ABC/The Washington Post polls for the debate criteria and that candidates must be at an average of 15% in these polls.

On September 16, the commission announced the official invitation of both Clinton and Trump to participate in the first debate to be held on September 26 at Hofstra University, but Johnson and Stein did not meet the established criteria, and would not be participants in the debate. The commission also confirmed that Clinton and Trump had committed to participate. It was also announced that Mike Pence and Tim Kaine would be participating in the only scheduled vice presidential debate, to take place at Longwood University on October 4. The 15% threshold was reapplied with polling numbers following the first debate in order to judge the participants in the second debate on October 9.

Moderators for the four debates were announced September 2, 2016.

=== Topics addressed and not addressed ===
Over the combined six hours of debate time at the three presidential debates and one vice presidential debate, the issues most raised in moderators' questions were the Syrian civil war (six questions) and terrorism (four questions). U.S.-Russia relations, immigration, job creation, Trump's taxes, and Trump's lewd leaked recording controversy were each asked about in three questions, and Clinton's emails, the Supreme Court, Social Security, taxation of the wealthy, the national debt, Iraq, the Affordable Care Act, "uniting the country," nuclear weapons, and the legitimacy of the election, were each the subject of two questions. A number of issues were the subject of a single question, including expectations of police conduct, race relations, abortion, gun policy, "birtherism," jobs in the energy industry, cyberterrorism, Islamophobia, the Clinton Foundation, the Donald J. Trump Foundation, the strengths of the candidates' opponents, the skills of the vice presidential nominees, the candidate's faith, the low favorability ratings of both candidates, the paid speeches given by Clinton, Trump's Twitter posts, Clinton's "basket of deplorables" remark, Clinton's "look," and the candidates' behavior.

The debate moderators failed to ask a question about climate change at any of the three debates, although Clinton did touch on the issue twice as part of responses to other questions. The moderators' failure to address the issue prompted complaints by commentators. David Leonhardt of The New York Times termed it "a failure of journalism" and a "a grievous error." Prominent climate scientists Kerry Emanuel and Michael E. Mann, as well as activist group 350.org, criticized the failure of the debates to address the issue.

A number of other issues were either addressed sparingly or not at all:

- On national security issues, the sole mention of Afghanistan, the U.S.'s longest-running war, came in a mention by Clinton in response to a question about NATO in the first debate. Veterans and the VA were the subject of brief mentions six times over the three presidential debates, but "never in the context of major policy or reform proposals."
- On foreign policy, a number of issues were not addressed by any candidate or moderator, including Africa, U.S.-Cuba relations, China's nine-dash line, South America, Egypt, and drone warfare.
- On domestic policy, issues that neither candidate mentioned in any debate include universal pre-kindergarten, affirmative action, the death penalty, the NSA, the Patriot Act, marijuana, charter schools, and DACA or the Dreamers.
- On economic issues, issues that neither candidate mentioned in any debate include budget sequestration, the capital gains tax, paid leave, oil drilling and fracking, pensions, and labor unions.
- On Russian cyberattacks on the United States and influence on the election, no questions were asked, but during the third debate Clinton revealed her knowledge of behind the scenes events, which she stated happened because Putin favored Trump, whom she called a "puppet". Trump strongly rejected the description.

=== Speaking time ===
Speaking time at the debates was as follows:

- At the first presidential debate, Trump spoke for 45 minutes and three seconds; Clinton spoke for 41 minutes and 50 seconds.
- At the second presidential debate, Trump spoke for 40 minutes and 10 seconds; Clinton spoke for 39 minutes and five seconds.
- At the third presidential debate, Trump spoke for 35 minutes and 41 seconds; Clinton spoke for 41 minutes and 46 seconds.

Overall, Clinton spoke for 107 seconds more than Trump.

=== Polling ===
The following polls were conducted prior to each of the respective debates, and determined the candidates who participated in each debate.

Candidates in green participated in the debate, while those in red were excluded. Italics denotes the leading candidate in the respective poll.

==== First presidential debate ====
The following polls were the most recent conducted prior to September 16, 2016, the polling deadline for both the first presidential debate and only vice presidential debate:

Poll	Date taken	Hillary Clinton Tim Kaine Democratic	Donald Trump Mike Pence Republican	Gary Johnson Bill Weld Libertarian	Jill Stein Ajamu Baraka Green
ABC/The Washington Post	September 5–8	46%	41%	9%	2%
CBS/The New York Times	September 9–13	41%	41%	8%	4%
CNN/Opinion Research Corporation	September 1–4	43%	45%	7%	2%
Fox News	September 11–14	41%	40%	8%	3%
NBC/The Wall Street Journal	July 31 – August 3	43%	34%	10%	5%
Average	July 31 – September 14	42.8%	40.2%	8.4%	3.2%

==== Second presidential debate ====
The following polls were the most recent conducted prior to October 4, 2016, the polling deadline for the second presidential debate:

Poll	Date taken	Hillary Clinton Democratic	Donald Trump Republican	Gary Johnson Libertarian	Jill Stein Green
ABC/The Washington Post	September 19–22	46%	44%	5%	1%
CBS/The New York Times	September 28 – October 2	45%	41%	8%	3%
CNN/Opinion Research Corporation	September 28 – October 2	47%	42%	7%	2%
Fox News	September 27–29	43%	40%	8%	4%
NBC/The Wall Street Journal	September 16–19	43%	37%	9%	2%
Average	September 16 – October 2	44.8%	40.8%	7.4%	2.6%

==== Third presidential debate ====
The following polls were the most recent conducted prior to October 14, 2016, the polling deadline for the third presidential debate:

Poll	Date taken	Hillary Clinton Democratic	Donald Trump Republican	Gary Johnson Libertarian	Jill Stein Green
ABC/The Washington Post	September 19–22	46%	44%	5%	1%
CBS/The New York Times	September 28 – October 2	45%	41%	8%	3%
CNN/Opinion Research Corporation	September 28 – October 2	47%	42%	7%	2%
Fox News	October 10–12	45%	38%	7%	3%
NBC/The Wall Street Journal	October 8–10	46%	37%	8%	2%
Average	September 19 – October 12	45.8%	40.4%	7.0%	2.2%

== Debate list ==
All presidential debates (including the vice presidential debate) ran from 9:00 p.m. to 10:30 p.m. EDT.

2016 United States presidential election debates
No.	Date and time	Host	Location	Moderator	Participants	
Key: P Participant					Democratic	Republican
Key: P Participant					Secretary Hillary Clinton of New York	Businessman Donald Trump of New York
1	Monday, September 26, 2016 9:00 – 10:30 p.m. EDT	Hofstra University	Hempstead, New York	Lester Holt of NBC	P	P
2	Sunday, October 9, 2016, 9:00 – 10:30 p.m. EDT	Washington University in St. Louis	St. Louis, Missouri	Martha Raddatz of ABC; Anderson Cooper of CNN	P	P
3	Wednesday, October 19, 2016, 9:00 – 10:30 p.m. EDT	University of Nevada, Las Vegas	Paradise, Nevada	Chris Wallace of Fox	P	P

2016 United States vice presidential debate
No.	Date and time	Host	Location	Moderator	Participants	
Key: P Participant					Democratic	Republican
Key: P Participant					Senator Tim Kaine of Virginia	Governor Mike Pence of Indiana
VP	Tuesday, October 4, 2016 9:00 – 10:30 p.m. EDT	Longwood University	Farmville, Virginia	Elaine Quijano of CBS	P	P

== September 26: First presidential debate (Hofstra University) ==
First presidential debate
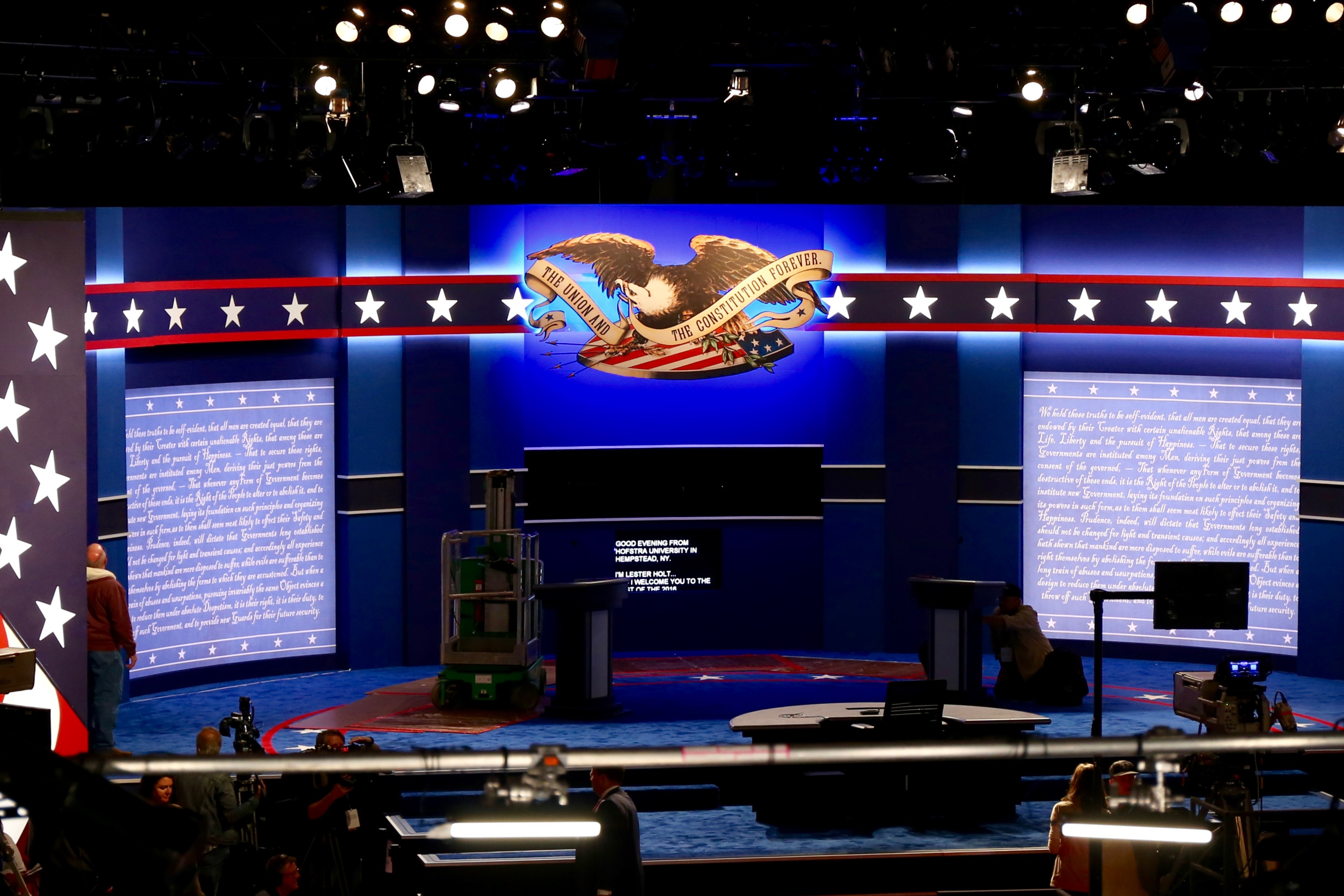
- The set of the first debate
- Date(s): September 26, 2016
- Duration: 95 minutes
- Venue: Hofstra University
- Location: Hempstead, New York
- Participants: Hillary Clinton; Donald Trump
- Footage: NBC; C-SPAN; Bloomberg Politics
- Moderator(s): Lester Holt of NBC
- Transcript: Commission on Presidential Debates; Politico; The Washington Post
- Fact checking: FactCheck.org; PolitiFact; NPR; The New York Times; Associated Press Archived March 3, 2017, at the Wayback Machine; Bloomberg Politics
- Website: hofstra.edu/debate

The first presidential debate between former Secretary of State Hillary Clinton and Businessman Donald Trump, took place on Monday, September 26, 2016, at Hofstra University in Hempstead, New York. The debate was moderated by Lester Holt of NBC. It was originally scheduled to take place at Wright State University, but the venue was changed due to security and financial concerns.

=== Format ===
The first presidential debate was divided into six segments, each of approximately 15 minutes in length, with the moderator introducing a topic and giving each candidate two minutes, followed by approximately 8 minutes and 45 seconds of facilitated discussion between the two candidates, with both candidates receiving approximately equal time. The questions discussed during the 90 minutes were at the sole discretion of the moderator, and were not shared beforehand with the commission or with either campaign. Each candidate spoke in front of a lectern. Besides applause at the beginning and end of the debate, there was no audience participation allowed, but sporadic applause occurred at various points throughout the 90 minutes.

The segments were on the economy and job creation, trade, the federal deficit, race relations and policing, the war on terror, the foreign policy of the United States, and each candidate's experience in the political and business realm.

=== Reception ===
Debate winner
Outlet	Clinton	Trump	Not sure
CNN/ORC	62%	27%	11%
PPP	51%	40%	9%
YouGov	57%	30%	13%
Politico/Morning Consult	49%	26%	25%
Echelon Insights	48%	22%	30%
Reuters/Ipsos	56%	26%	18%
NBC News/SurveyMonkey	52%	21%	27%
Gallup	61%	27%	12%
Fox News	61%	21%	18%
ABC News/The Washington Post	53%	18%	29%
CBS News	32%	10%	58%

Writing on September 28, FiveThirtyEight found that every scientific poll to that point had suggested that voters thought Hillary Clinton performed better than Donald Trump in the debate. A CNN/ORC poll of debate viewers found that 62% believed Clinton won, compared to 27% for Trump. A poll conducted by Public Policy Polling found that 51% thought Clinton won the debate, while 40% thought Trump won. A YouGov poll found that 57% of Americans declared Clinton the winner, while 30% declared Trump the winner. A Politico/Morning Consult poll showed that 49% of likely voters thought that Clinton won the debate, while 26% thought that Trump won, and 25% were undecided. Echelon Insights polling showed that Clinton won the debate 48–22, and that the debate made 41% of respondents more likely to vote for Clinton while 29% were more likely to vote for Trump. A Reuters/Ipsos poll found that 56% of Americans thought Clinton did better, while 26% thought Trump did. An NBC News/SurveyMonkey poll shows that 52% of likely voters who followed the debate chose Clinton was the winner, 21% chose Trump, and 26% did not choose either candidate. A Gallup poll showed that more respondents thought Clinton did a better job than Trump by a margin of 61% to 27%. A Fox News poll shows that 61% of respondents thought that Clinton won the debate while 21% said Trump did. An ABC News/The Washington Post poll shows that 53% of respondents thought that Clinton won the debate while 18% said Trump did. A CBS News poll shows that 32% of likely voters say that they thought better of Clinton after watching the debate, but only 10% of voters said that they thought better of Trump afterward.

A panel of Los Angeles Times analysts consisting of Doyle McManus and two others found that Clinton won all six of the debate segments. Among swing-state party officials and strategists surveyed by Politico, 79% agreed that Trump did not win the debate.

==== Moderation ====
A confident Trump tells VOA News he felt he won the debate against rival Clinton during an interview in the spin room immediately after the debate.

The performance of Lester Holt as moderator of the debate received mixed reactions, with political critics stating that Holt struggled to keep control of the debate, and although he challenged both candidates, Holt's repeated attempts to get the candidates to adhere to the time restrictions were ignored.

Michael M. Grynbaum of The New York Times described Holt's performance by stating "He was silent for minutes at a time, allowing Hillary Clinton and Donald J. Trump to joust and bicker between themselves—and sometimes talk right over him—prompting some viewers to wonder if Mr. Holt had left the building." He continued, "Being less conspicuous often means attracting less criticism, and Mr. Holt's conservative approach seemed designed to avoid the opprobrium that befell his NBC colleague, Matt Lauer, whose performance at a forum this month was widely panned after he repeatedly interrupted Mrs. Clinton and failed to challenge Mr. Trump." Hadas Gold of Politico wrote "Lester Holt was on an island on Monday night. And for most of the first presidential debate, he stayed there, letting the battleships of Hillary Clinton and Donald Trump shoot their missiles at one another. It made for some memorable exchanges between Trump and Clinton, matched in close-up on most networks. For some debate watchers, that's what they want their moderators to do: say 'go' and let them run. But it also left some gaps where viewers probably expected sharp questions."

==== Viewership ====
The debate set the record as the most-watched debate in television history, with 84 million viewers across the 13 channels that carried it live and were counted by Nielsen, surpassing the previous record of 80.6 million viewers set by the only debate between Jimmy Carter and Ronald Reagan in 1980. These numbers do not account for the millions of viewers who watched the debates online and the people who watched the debate at parties, bars, restaurants, and offices. Two million concurrent viewers watched it live on YouTube, while there were 8 million views on Facebook (whose numbers do not break down into unique viewers); in addition, 1.4 million unique viewers watched it live on CBS's streaming service. All debate-related video on YouTube exceeded 88 million views on October 3, 2016. CNN Digital reported 2.4 million live streams, and Yahoo News reported 5 million views, both live and on-demand.

Legend

cable news network
broadcast network
online streaming

Total television viewers

Network	Viewers
NBC	18,156,000
ABC	13,521,000
CBS	12,082,000
FNC	11,359,000
CNN	9,805,000
Fox	5,573,000
MSNBC	4,895,000

Viewers 25 to 54

Network	Viewers
NBC	8,323,000
ABC	4,802,000
CBS	4,750,000
CNN	4,435,000
FNC	3,525,000
Fox	2,709,000
MSNBC	1,576,000

Total streams reported

Network	Streams
YouTube	2,000,000
Facebook	8,000,000
CBS	2,980,000
CNN	2,400,000
Yahoo	5,000,000
Twitter	2,500,000

Source: adweek.com

== October 4: Vice presidential debate (Longwood University) ==
Vice presidential debate
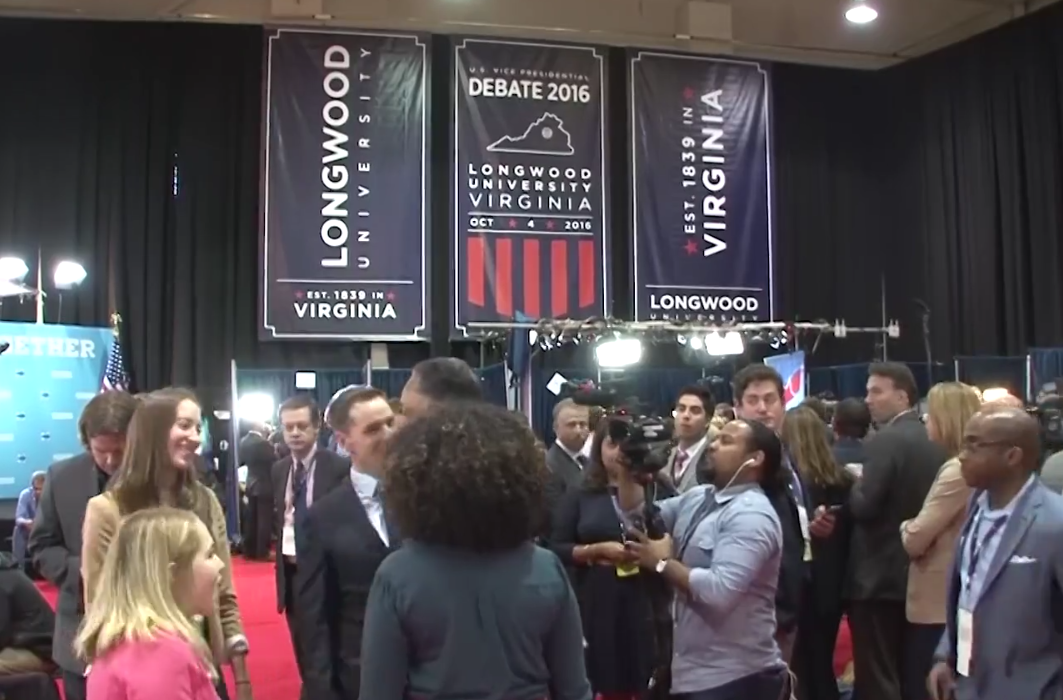
- The debate's spin room
- Date(s): October 4, 2016
- Duration: 92 minutes
- Venue: Longwood University
- Location: Farmville, Virginia
- Participants: Tim Kaine; Mike Pence
- Footage: CBS; C-SPAN; Bloomberg Politics
- Moderator(s): Elaine Quijano of CBS
- Transcript: Commission on Presidential Debates; The New York Times; The Washington Post
- Fact checking: PolitiFact; NPR; ABC News; The New York Times; Associated Press
- Website: debate.longwood.edu

The only vice presidential debate between Senator Tim Kaine and Governor Mike Pence took place on Tuesday, October 4, 2016, at Longwood University in Farmville, Virginia. The debate was moderated by Elaine Quijano of CBS.

=== Format ===
The candidates were seated at a table with Quijano. The debate consisted of nine segments, each 10 minutes in length. Both candidates were given two minutes to respond to questions, with the remaining time used for a deeper discussion of the topic. Quijano asked questions about Donald Trump's temperament, the economy, Social Security, police and race relations, nuclear weapons, abortion and religious faith.

=== Reception ===
Debate winner
Outlet	Pence	Kaine	Not sure
CNN	48%	42%	10%

A CNN instant-poll found that 48% of viewers believed Pence had won while 42% thought Kaine won. Pence was criticized after the debate for not defending Donald Trump's comments, while Kaine was criticized for being too aggressive and interrupting.

Two hours before the debate took place, the website of the Republican National Committee declared Pence the clear winner, writing "During the debate we helped fact check and monitor the conversation in real time @GOP." The post went on to say that his strong points concerned the economy and Clinton's alleged "scandals". The post was removed prior to the start of the debate, but not before getting widespread press and social media attention.

Rachel Maddow of MSNBC said that the debate was occasionally "incomprehensible" due to the number of times that the candidates interrupted each other. According to ABC News, Kaine interrupted 70 times throughout the debate.

=== Moderation ===
Elaine Quijano moderated and thereby became the first Asian American to moderate a U.S. debate for national elected office in the general election, and the youngest journalist to moderate a debate since 1988. It was also the first time a digital network anchor had been selected to moderate a national debate.

=== Viewership ===
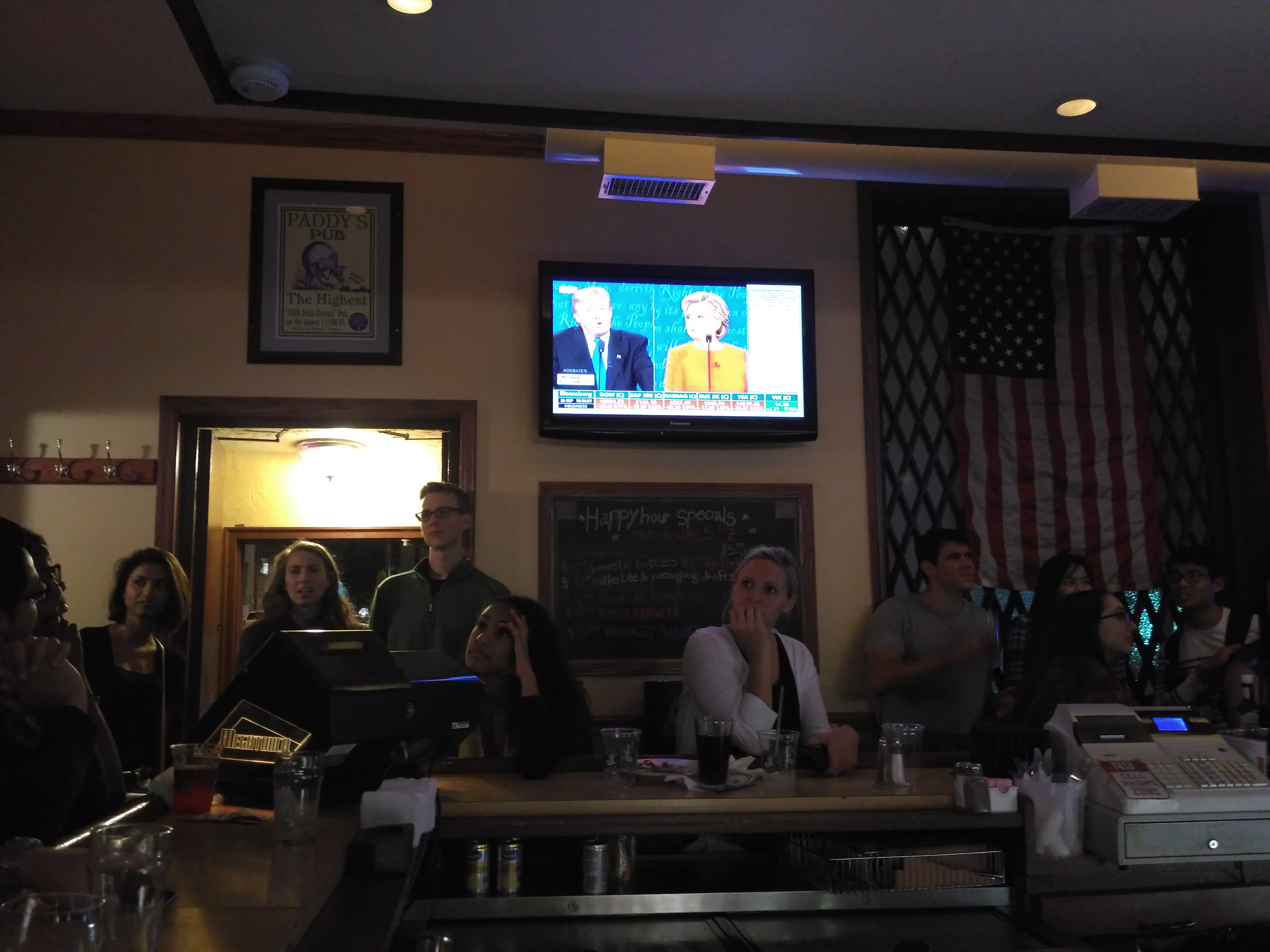
Patrons of a Philadelphia pub watching the debates

According to Nielsen, the four broadcast networks and the three largest cable news channels averaged around 36 million viewers.

Legend

cable news network
broadcast network

Total television viewers

Network	Viewership
NBC	7,028,000
CBS	6,462,000
ABC	6,149,000
FNC	6,083,000
CNN	4,167,000
MSNBC	3,125,000
Fox	2,208,000

Viewers 25 to 54

Network	Viewership
NBC	2,950,000
CBS	1,184,000
ABC	1,858,000
CNN	1,680,000
FNC	1,506,000
Fox	1,107,000
MSNBC	908,000

== October 9: Second presidential debate (Washington University in St. Louis) ==
Second presidential debate
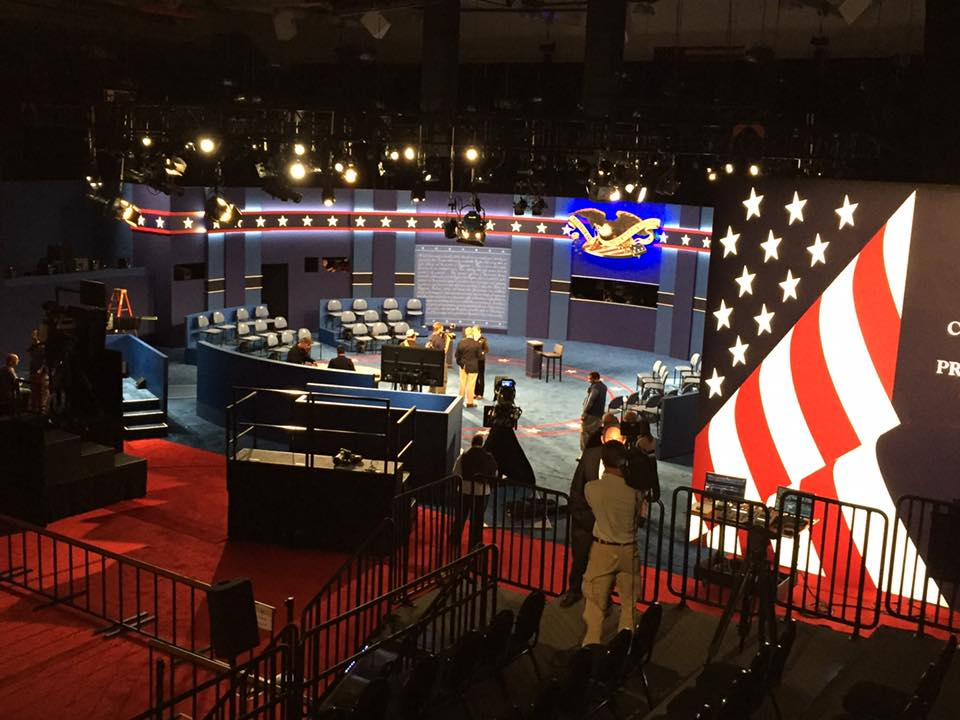
- The set of the second debate
- Date(s): October 9, 2016
- Duration: 90 minutes
- Venue: Washington University in St. Louis
- Location: St. Louis, Missouri
- Participants: Hillary Clinton; Donald Trump
- Footage: NBC; CBS; C-SPAN; Bloomberg Politics
- Moderator(s): Anderson Cooper of CNN; Martha Raddatz of ABC News
- Transcript: Commission on Presidential Debates; Politico; The New York Times
- Fact checking: FactCheck.org; PolitiFact; NPR; The New York Times
- Website: debate.wustl.edu

The second presidential debate between former Secretary of State Hillary Clinton and Businessman Donald Trump took place on Sunday, October 9, 2016, at Washington University in St. Louis, Missouri. The town hall style debate was moderated by Martha Raddatz of ABC and Anderson Cooper of CNN.

=== Format ===
The debate was conducted in a "town meeting" format on Sunday, October 9, with an audience of uncommitted voters selected by the Gallup Organization. The CPD originally stipulated that half of the questions come from the audience, while the other half would come from the moderators "based on topics of broad public interest as reflected in social media and other sources." The Commission subsequently invited members of the public to submit and vote on questions through the bipartisan Open Debate Coalition's website. Moderators chose from the 30 most popular questions. CNN's Anderson Cooper and ABC's Martha Raddatz were the moderators. Candidates had two minutes to respond with an additional minute for the moderator to facilitate further discussion.

=== Content ===
Members of the audience were allowed to ask questions. The eight questions, in order, were:

1. "The last presidential debate could have been rated as MA, mature audiences per TV parental guidelines. Knowing that educators assign viewing the presidential debates as students’ homework, do you feel you are modelling appropriate and positive behavior for today's youth?"
2. "The Affordable Care Act known as Obamacare, it is not affordable. Premiums have gone up, deductibles have gone up, copays has gone up, prescriptions have gone up and the coverage has gone down. What will you do to bring the cost down and make coverage better?"
3. "There are 3.3 million Muslims in the United States and I'm one of them. You've mentioned working with Muslim nations. But with Islamophobia on the rise, how will you help people like me deal with the consequences of being labelled as a threat to the country after the election is over?"
4. "What specific tax provisions will you change to ensure the wealthiest Americans pay their fair share in taxes?"
5. "Do you believe you can be a devoted president to all the people in the United States?"
6. "Perhaps the most important aspect of this election is the Supreme Court justice. What would you prioritize as the most important aspect of selecting a Supreme Court justice?"
7. "What steps will your energy policy take to meet our energy needs, while at the same time remaining environmentally-friendly and minimizing job loss for fossil power plant workers?" - this question was asked by audience member Ken Bone (see below).
8. "Regardless of the current rhetoric, would either of you name one positive thing that you respect in one another?"

The first portion of the content was dominated by discussion of a tape of Trump making lewd comments about women to Billy Bush, which had been leaked two days earlier. Trump attempted to deflect criticism by making counter-accusations of sexual misconduct against Bill Clinton. Trump had invited four people who had accused Bill Clinton of sexual assault to a press conference prior to the debate and accused Hillary Clinton of attacking those same women. At one point in the debate, Trump raised the issue of Hillary Clinton's emails. Trump stated that if elected, he would appoint a special prosecutor to investigate Secretary Clinton in relation to the matter. Clinton responded by remarking that the country was lucky that someone with Trump's temperament was not in charge of the law, to which Trump promptly responded, "because you'd be in jail." The audience cheered this line, to which Cooper interrupted the debate and warned the audience to refrain from making noise. An array of scholars, including political scientists and law professors, criticized Trump's pledge to imprison Clinton, saying that it reflected an anti-democratic impulse.

=== Reception ===
Debate winner
Outlet	Clinton	Trump	Not sure
Politico/Morning Consult	42%	28%	30%
CNN/ORC	57%	34%	9%
NBC News/SurveyMonkey	44%	34%	22%
Reuters/Ipsos	53%	32%	15%
Gallup	53%	35%	12%
Fox News	52%	39%	9%
CRI	52%	31%	17%
Qriously	44%	33%	23%
Fox 2 Detroit/Mitchell	48%	36%	16%

A Politico/Morning Consult poll showed that 42% of respondents considered Clinton the winner of the debate, while 28% considered Trump the winner, and a slightly higher percentage (30%) were undecided. A CNN/ORC poll found that 57% of viewers believed Clinton won, compared to 34% for Trump, despite the fact that most respondents felt that the latter exceeded expectations. An NBC News/SurveyMonkey poll showed that Clinton won the debate with 44% to Trump's 34%, while 21% said neither won. A Reuters/Ipsos poll found that 53% of viewers said Clinton won while 32% said Trump won. According to a Gallup poll, 53% of viewers considered Clinton to be the winner while 35% considered Trump the winner. A Fox News poll of debate watchers found 52% considered Clinton the winner compared to 39% for Trump, with 9% saying they tied or did not know. A Baldwin Wallace University Community Research Institute (CRI) poll of likely Ohio voters showed that 52% found that Clinton won the debate, 31% that Trump won, and 17% found that it was a tie. According to a Qriously poll of likely voters in eight key battleground states, 44% gave the win to Clinton while 33% gave it to Trump. According to a Fox 2 Detroit/Mitchell Poll of likely Michigan voters, 48% gave the win to Clinton while 36% gave it to Trump.

Trump's claim that he won the second debate with Hillary Clinton "in a landslide" in "every poll" was found to be false by Politifact, which noted that "not only did Trump not win by a landslide margin, he didn't win any of the polls at all".

=== Ken Bone phenomenon ===
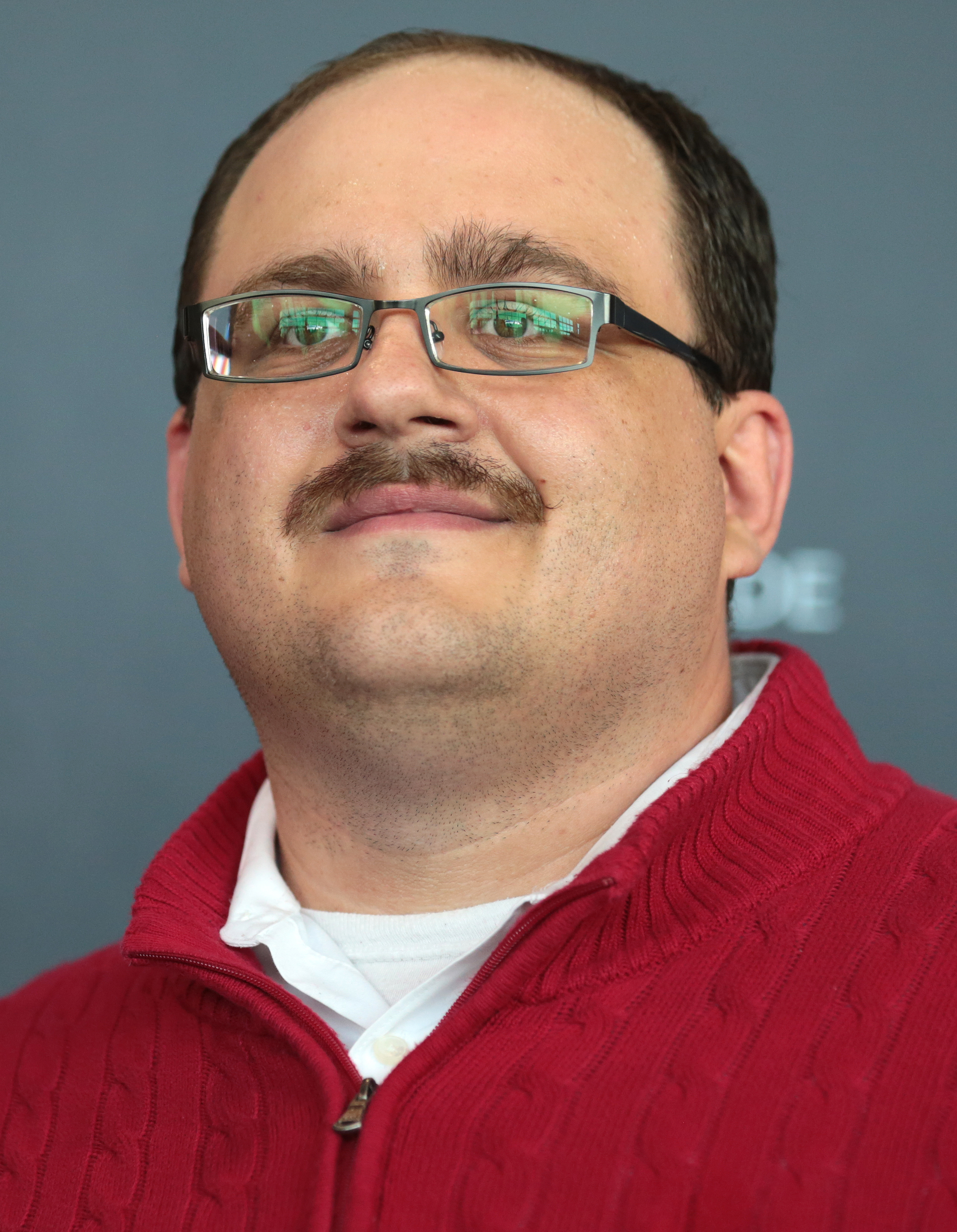
Ken Bone

Questioner Ken Bone, a power plant operator from Illinois, had a media presence and became an Internet meme in the days following the debate. His rise to popularity was due to his name, his red sweater, and his use of a disposable camera prior to and after the debate. Bone appeared on ESPN College GameDay and @midnight. He was portrayed by Bobby Moynihan during the cold open of NBC sketch comedy show Saturday Night Live's October 15 episode, dancing to the song "Get Ready for This". Bone received a short-term endorsement deal with American transportation network company Uber to promote the launch of Uber Select in St. Louis. A backlash against Bone happened after controversial posts under his username on Reddit were revealed.

=== Viewership ===
According to Nielsen, approximately 66.5 million people watched the second presidential debate on television across 11 networks. YouTube reported 1.5 million peak live streams and 124 million views on debate-related videos as of October 11.

Legend

cable news network
broadcast network
online streaming

Total television viewers

Network	Viewers
CBS	16,456,000
ABC	11,512,000
CNN	11,289,000
FNC	9,888,000
Fox	5,589,000
MSNBC	5,542,000
Univision	2,364,000
FBN	565,000

Viewers 25 to 54

Network	Viewers
CBS	6,411,000
CNN	4,858,000
ABC	4,641,000
FNC	2,928,000
Fox	2,823,000
MSNBC	1,761,000

Total streams reported

Network	Streams
YouTube	1,500,000
CNN	2,300,000
Twitter	3,200,000

== October 19: Third presidential debate (University of Nevada, Las Vegas) ==
Third presidential debate
- Date(s): October 19, 2016
- Duration: 93 minutes
- Venue: University of Nevada, Las Vegas
- Location: Paradise, Nevada
- Participants: Hillary Clinton; Donald Trump
- Footage: CBS; NBC; C-SPAN
- Moderator(s): Chris Wallace of Fox
- Transcript: Commission on Presidential Debates; The Washington Post; The New York Times
- Fact checking: The Washington Post; The New York Times; PolitiFact; NPR; CBS News Archived March 23, 2021, at the Wayback Machine
- Website: unlv.edu/2016debate

The third and final presidential debate between former Secretary of State Hillary Clinton and Businessman Donald Trump took place on Wednesday, October 19, 2016, at the University of Nevada, Las Vegas in Paradise, Nevada.

=== Format ===
The format mirrored that of the first debate: 90 minutes divided into six topical segments of approximately 15 minutes each. The moderator began each segment with a question and gave each candidate two minutes, followed by facilitated discussion between the two candidates, with each receiving approximately equal time. Questions were at the sole discretion of the moderator. Each candidate was stationed at a lectern. Audience participation was confined to applause at the beginning and end of the debate.

=== Moderation ===
The debate was moderated by Chris Wallace of Fox. This marked the first instance when a Fox News host moderated a presidential debate.

The topics, announced in advance of the debate, were: debt and entitlements, immigration, economy, Supreme Court, foreign hot spots, and fitness to be president.

=== Reception ===
Debate winner
Outlet	Clinton	Trump	Not sure
Politico/Morning Consult	43%	26%	31%
NBC News/SurveyMonkey	46%	37%	17%
ABC News	52%	29%	19%
Gallup	60%	31%	9%
CBS News	49%	39%	12%

A Politico/Morning Consult poll found that 43% of respondents considered Clinton the winner of the debate, with 26% saying Trump. An NBC News/SurveyMonkey poll showed that 46% of respondents considered Clinton as the winner, where as 37% considered Trump the winner. An ABC News poll found that 52% of likely voters thought that Clinton was the winner, with 29% saying that Trump won the debate. A Gallup poll showed that Clinton beat Trump 60% to 31% in perceptions of who won debate. A poll by the CBS News Battleground Tracker of viewers in 13 swing states found that 49% of voters in those states thought that Clinton won the debate, while 39% thought Trump won, with 12% calling it a tie.

Trump's use of the phrases "bad hombres" and "nasty woman" spurred massive viral backlash, the latter resulting in the formation of the nasty women movement in response.

An Associated Press/GfK poll, which asked respondents about the candidates' performance in all three debates, found that 69% thought that Clinton performed better while 29% thought that Trump did.

=== Viewership ===
According to Nielsen, approximately 71.6 million people watched the third presidential debate on television across 13 networks. YouTube reported 1.7 million peak live streams and 140 million views on debate-related videos as of October 20.

Legend

cable news network
broadcast network
online streaming

Total television viewers

Network	Viewers
FNC	11,349,000
ABC	10,962,000
NBC	10,393,000
CBS	10,120,000
CNN	8,712,000
Fox	6,622,000
MSNBC	5,517,000
PBS	2,700,000
Univision	2,378,000
Telemundo	1,479,000
FBN	714,000
CNBC	559,000

Viewers 25 to 54

Network	Viewers
NBC	4,472,000
ABC	4,365,000
CBS	3,703,000
FNC	3,500,000
CNN	3,462,000
Fox	3,137,000
MSNBC	1,801,000
Univision	1,190,000
Telemundo	739,000
CNBC	289,000
FBN	166,000

Total streams reported

Network	Streams
YouTube	1,700,000
CNN	1,900,000

== Free & Equal Elections Foundation-sponsored debate ==
The Free & Equal Elections Foundation hosted a single presidential debate in 2016. It was held at the University of Colorado Boulder's Macky Auditorium on October 25, 2016. The debate was co-hosted by Student Voices Count. Originally, all presidential candidates with ballot access sufficient to represent a majority of electoral votes were invited. In October 2016, Free and Equal extended the invitation to all candidates with ballot lines representing at least fifteen percent of potential voters: the Democratic, Republican, Libertarian, Green, Constitution, Reform, and Socialism and Liberation parties, as well as independent candidate Evan McMullin. Gary Johnson, who participated in the 2012 debate, had already publicly declined in July 2016 to debate Jill Stein on The Young Turks because of a matter of "just time".

Free & Equal debates, 2016
N°	Date	Host	Location	Moderators	Invited participants							
P Participant. A Absent invitee.					Democratic	Republican	Libertarian	Green	Constitution	Reform	PSL	Independent
P Participant. A Absent invitee.					Secretary Hillary Clinton of New York	Businessman Donald Trump of New York	Governor Gary Johnson of New Mexico	Doctor Jill Stein of Massachusetts	Lieutenant Darrell Castle of Tennessee	Businessman Rocky De La Fuente of California	Activist Gloria La Riva of California	Director Evan McMullin of Utah
1	October 25, 2016	University of Colorado Boulder	Boulder, Colorado	Ed Asner	A	A	A	A	P	P	P	A

== See also ==
- Hillary Clinton 2016 presidential campaign
- Donald Trump 2016 presidential campaign
- 2016 United States presidential election
- 2016 Democratic Party presidential debates and forums
- 2016 Green Party presidential debates and forums
- 2016 Libertarian Party presidential debates and forums
- 2016 Republican Party presidential debates and forums
- Timeline of Russian interference in the 2016 United States elections and Timeline of Russian interference in the 2016 United States elections (July 2016–election day)
