= McCamish Pavilion =

Basketball arena in Atlanta, Georgia

- The Thrillerdome
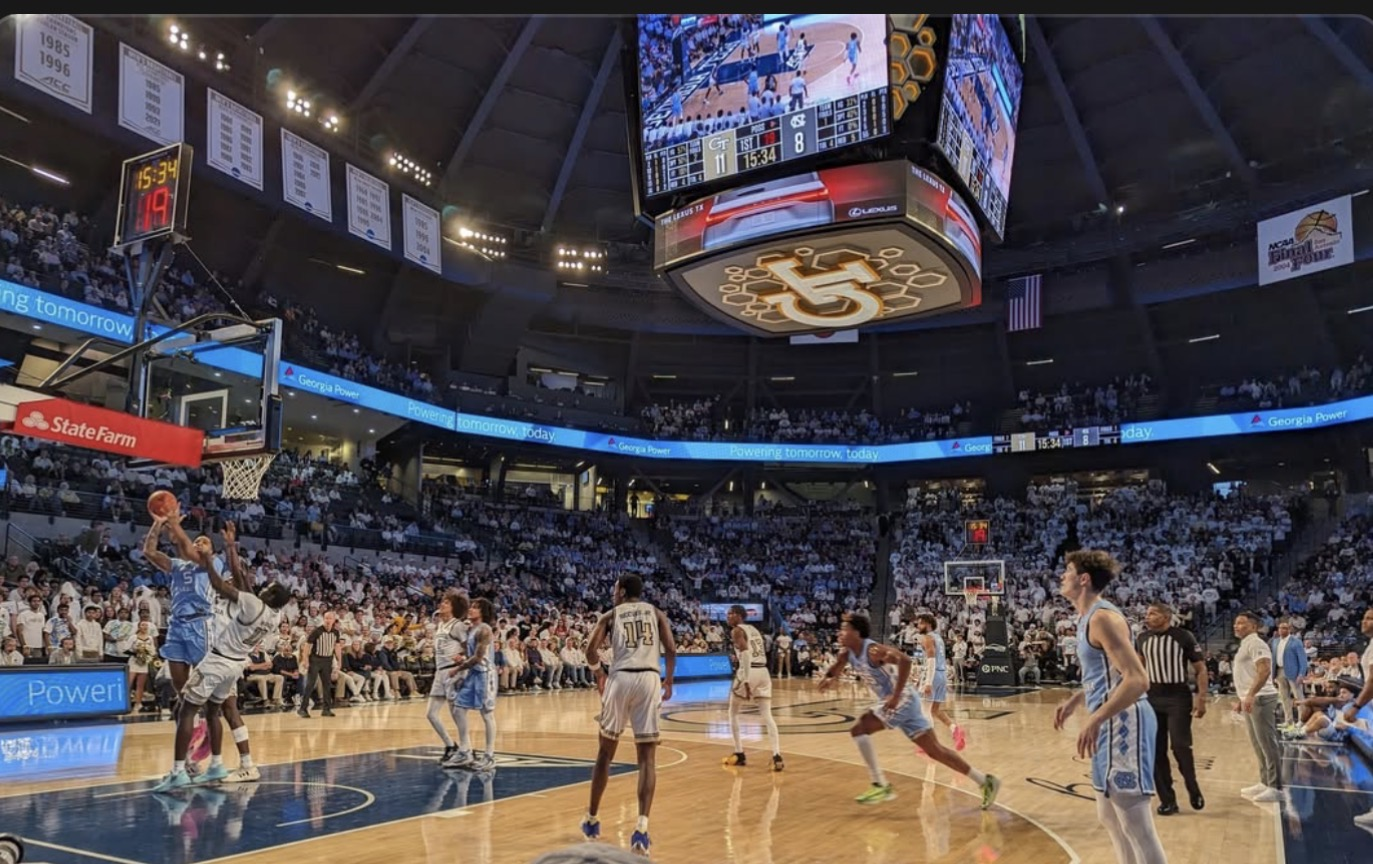
- The interior of McCamish Pavilion during a game in 2024.
- Interactive map of McCamish Pavilion
- Former names: Alexander Memorial Coliseum (1956–2011); Alexander Memorial Coliseum at McDonalds Center (1996–2005)
- Address: 965 Fowler St.
- Location: Atlanta, Georgia
- Coordinates: 33°46′51″N 84°23′34″W
- Owner: Georgia Tech (1956 - present)
- Operator: Georgia Tech
- Capacity: 8,600 (2012–present); 9,191 (1996–2011); 9,596 (1990–1996); 8,846 (1986–1990); 6,696 (1956–1986)
- Record attendance: 10,125 (1993 vs Duke)

Construction
- Opened: November 30, 1956
- Closed: March 6, 2011 (renovations)
- Reopened: November 9, 2012
- Cost: $1.6 million ($18.9 million in 2025 dollars) $45 million (2012 renovation)
- Architect: Aeck Associates of Atlanta

Tenants
- Georgia Tech Yellow Jackets (NCAA) (1956–2011, 2012–present); Atlanta Hawks (NBA) (1968–1972, 1997–1999); Atlanta Dream (WNBA) (2017–2018)

Hank McCamish Pavilion, nicknamed The Thrillerdome and originally known as Alexander Memorial Coliseum, is an indoor arena located on the campus of the Georgia Institute of Technology in Atlanta, Georgia. It is the home of the Georgia Tech Yellow Jackets men's basketball and Yellow Jackets women's basketball teams.

The venue previously hosted the Atlanta Hawks of the National Basketball Association (NBA) from 1968 to 1972 and again from 1997 to 1999. Tech's women's volleyball team occasionally uses the facility as well, primarily for NCAA tournament games and other matches that draw crowds that would overflow the O'Keefe Gymnasium.

== History ==
=== Alexander Memorial Coliseum ===
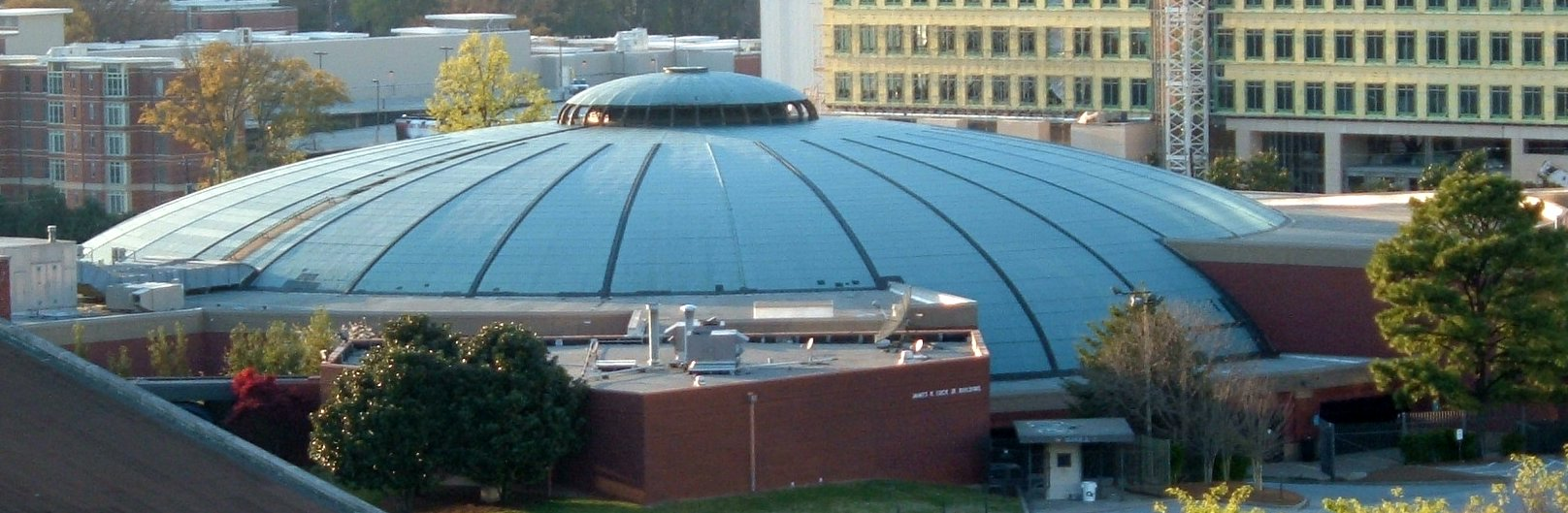
View of Alexander Memorial Coliseum from the southeast

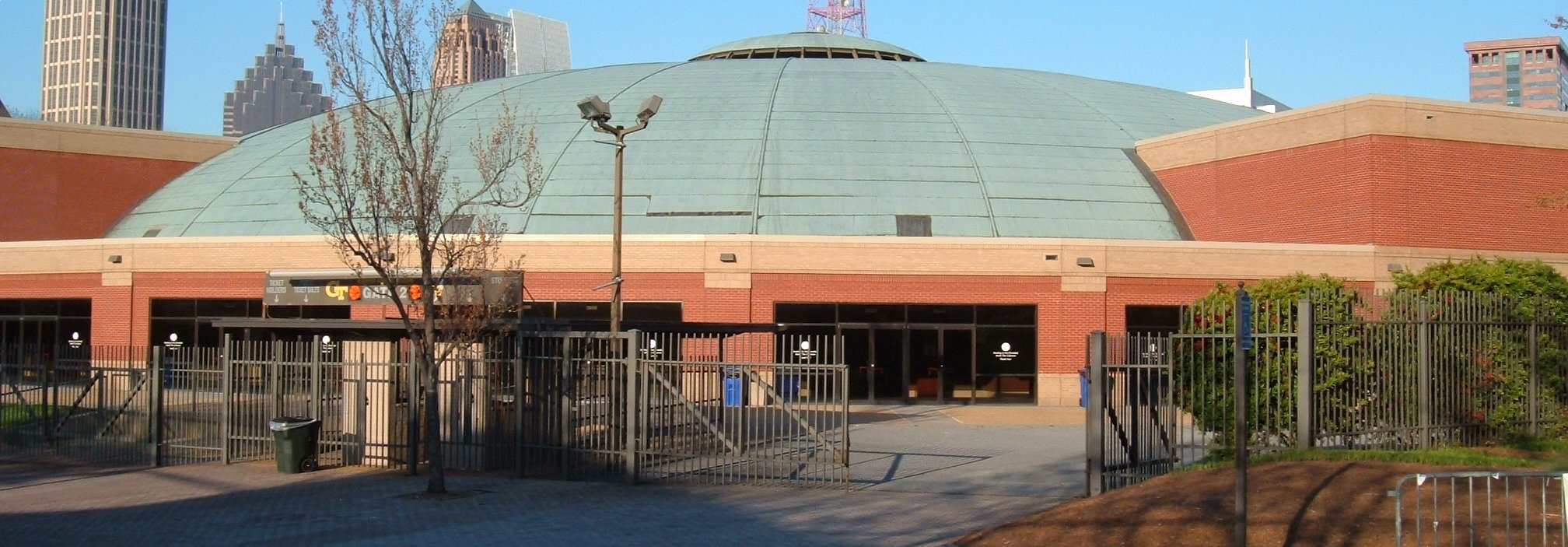
Alexander Memorial Coliseum from the southwest

The 270-foot-diameter (82 m) Alexander Coliseum opened in 1956 at the intersection of 10th Street and Fowler on the northeast end of the Georgia Tech campus. The building was named for William A. Alexander, Georgia Tech's football coach from 1920 to 1944 and the third athletic director (after John W. Heisman); his tenure as coach included the 1928 Rose Bowl team (the 1928 season, the Rose Bowl itself was played on January 1, 1929). The huge dome was constructed by Calvert Iron Works, Co., a local Atlanta company that built many Atlanta landmarks. It was designed and built without any support pillars to obstruct the view of any fans during games. It served as a replacement for the Third Street Gymnasium (later known as the Heisman Gym) on the campus of Georgia Tech, an 1,800-seat arena opened just 18 years before. The arena's original capacity was 6,996 seats, though crowds larger than that sometimes assembled for big games.

Between 1956 and 1996, the Coliseum had undergone three major renovations. In 1986, 2,150 seats were added in what was previously an upper walkway around the rim of the arena. In 1989–1990, 750 seats were added in the end zone areas. At this point official capacity attained 9,596 seats, which would be the peak capacity in the Coliseum's history. The last major renovation was during 1995–1996, prior to the 1996 Summer Olympics. The floor was lowered 4 feet (1.2 m) to increase seating, 12 luxury suites were added, and many of the benches were replaced with chairback seats. Sightlines were also improved for those sitting in the first few rows of the side of the court opposite the benches. Connected to the south end of the Coliseum are the Luck Building, and the Coliseum Annex. The facility was renamed Alexander Memorial Coliseum at McDonald's Center for 10 seasons from 1996 to 2005 in conjunction with a $5.5 million donation to help pay for the mid-1990s renovation, which decreased seating capacity to 9,191.

The Coliseum played host to the Atlanta Hawks after they moved from St. Louis while The Omni was under construction, and again between 1997 and 1999, after the Omni was demolished and while Philips Arena was being built on its site. During the latter period, the Hawks played most of their home games at the Georgia Dome with the remainder at the Coliseum. The team again played at McCamish Pavilion during October 2017 for preseason games, when Philips Arena improvements forced the Hawks to play there a third time.

During the 1996 Summer Olympics, the arena hosted the Olympic boxing tournament.

For most of its life, the Coliseum has hosted many rounds of the Georgia High School Association men's and women's state tournament games. The first integrated high school state tournament in Georgia history was played there before record overflow crowds in 1967.

The arena received its nickname, "The Thrillerdome," from former Tech color radio announcer and former ESPN broadcaster Brad Nessler, for the many close games it witnessed during the 1983–84 season. It became known as a particularly tough environment for visiting teams to play in during the 1980s, 1990s, and early 2000s. On certain occasions, standing room only crowds would allow for some games to have over 10,000 in attendance. This was the case on January 10, 1993 when a all-time record crowd of 10,125 people saw #10 Georgia Tech upset the #1 ranked Duke Blue Devils.

In 2003, the playing surface was renamed "Cremins Court" in honor of Bobby Cremins, Georgia Tech's head coach from 1981 to 2000.

On February 21, 2008, the men's basketball game between Georgia Tech and the University of Virginia was cancelled due to a leak in the roof that was caused by hard rainfall that had accumulated over the day. The decision to cancel the game was based on the fact that officials and staff at the game could not find where the water was coming through and they had no way to stop it. The game was delayed for about a half-hour, and then ultimately postponed until March 3, 2008.

On March 14, 2008, a tornado ripped through downtown Atlanta, causing damage to the CNN Center, Philips Arena, and Georgia Dome. During the weekend, the SEC men's basketball tournament was set to play at the Georgia Dome on Thursday through Sunday. The tornado struck while the third of four quarterfinal games was in overtime. While that game was completed, SEC officials decided not to risk playing the fourth. Later that night, the conference decided to move the tournament, including the championship game, to the smaller Coliseum (damage to the Dome's roof was confirmed shortly thereafter). Due to the reduced capacity, only players' families, school officials, credentialed media and 400 fans from each school were allowed to attend the remaining games.

=== Hank McCamish Pavilion ===
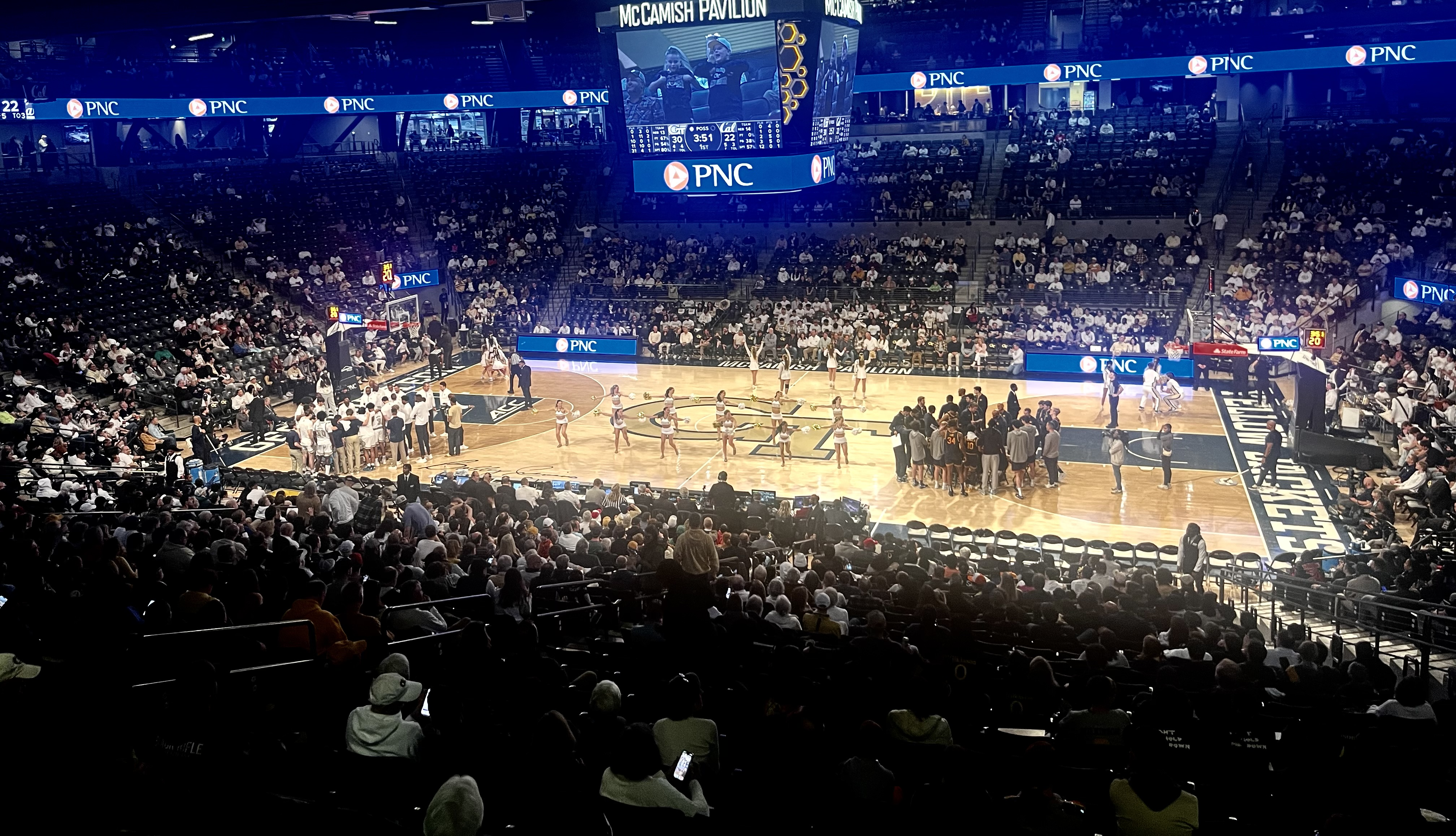
2025 Men’s Basketball game vs California at Hank McCamish Pavilion

On October 19, 2010, Georgia Tech announced that Alexander Memorial Coliseum would undergo a $45 million renovation and would be renamed McCamish Pavilion after Hank McCamish in honor of a $15 million donation from the McCamish family. The facility's extensive renovation included reconstruction of the seating bowl, the addition of an upper level balcony and club seating, and the expansion of the concourse and plaza area. During the renovation, Georgia Tech's basketball teams played their 2011–2012 games at Philips Arena and Gas South Arena.

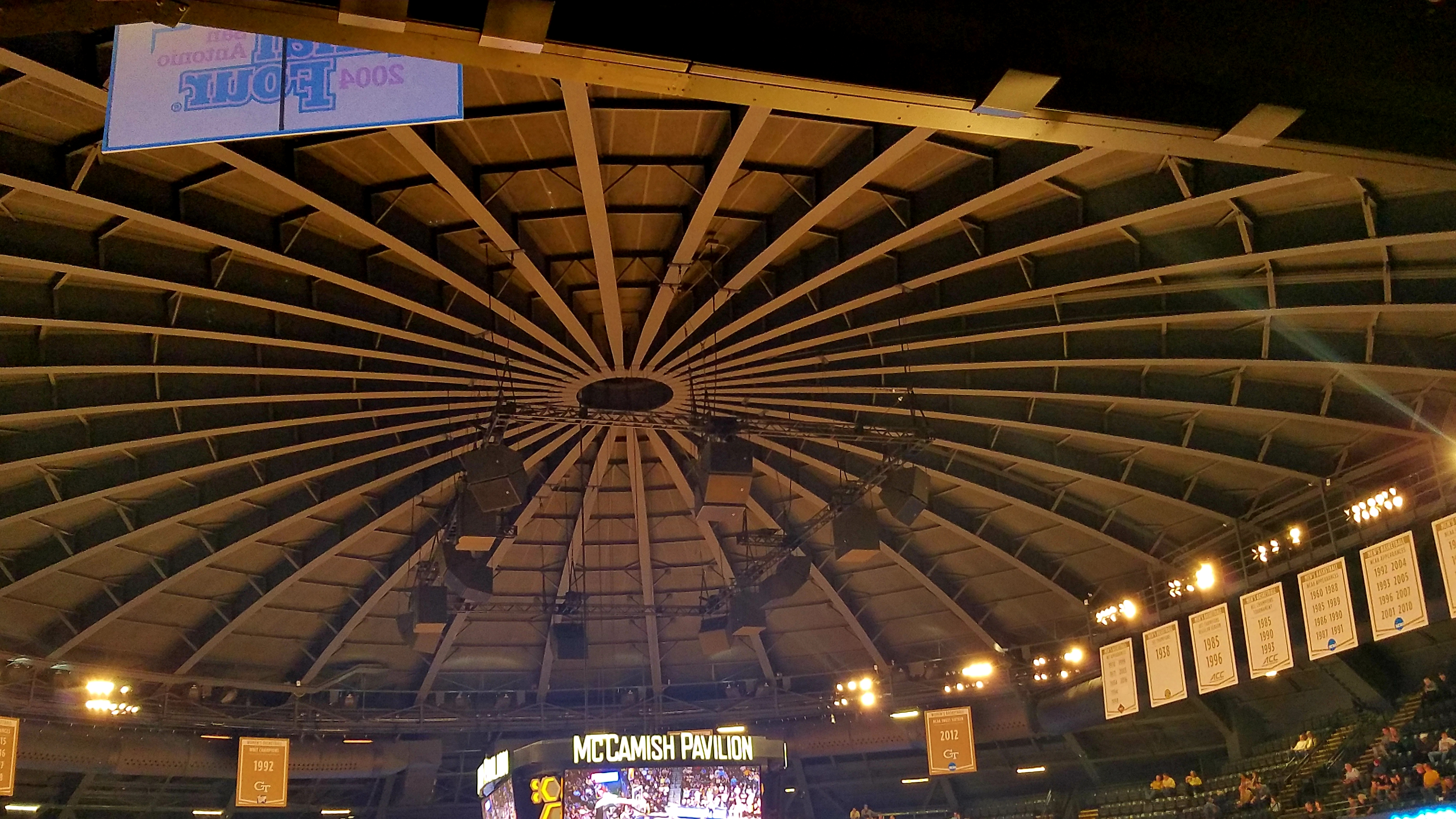
The familiar domed roof and the 32 steel support beams remain, but the McCamish interior is almost entirely different from the old Alexander Memorial Coliseum.

The first game in the renovated arena was on November 9, 2012, when the Yellow Jacket men's basketball team defeated Tulane in front of a sold-out crowd of 8,600 people. The playing surface retained the title "Cremins Court" from its predecessor.

On August 22, 2016, the Atlanta Dream of the Women's National Basketball Association (WNBA) announced that they would play the entirety of their 2017 and 2018 home schedules as well as any 2016 home playoff games at McCamish Pavilion due to renovations at Philips Arena conflicting with the WNBA schedule. Georgia State University held its Spring 2017 commencement ceremonies at McCamish Pavilion, due to the Georgia Dome's closure and scheduled demolition as well as other venues within Metro Atlanta being either unavailable, undersized, or too distant.

On January 14, 2019, McCamish Pavilion served as the venue for the swearing in of Georgia's 83rd Governor, Brian Kemp, as well as other recently elected state officials.

In recent years, McCamish has been the home of many upset wins for the Tech men's basketball team. Since the 2012 renovation, 14 ranked teams have lost at McCamish, five of those being in the top ten.

On June 27, 2024, the arena acted as the spin room for the first Presidential Debate in 2024. Later that year on October 28, it served as the venue for a Republican political rally led by former president Donald Trump in the final days of the 2024 United States presidential election.

On January 21, 2025 Georgia Tech’s men’s basketball team played 16th ranked North Carolina in front of 8,700 fans, which was the largest crowd to see a game in the arena since its 2012 renovation.

== See also ==
- List of NCAA Division I basketball arenas
