= News leak =

Unsanctioned release of confidential information to news media

A news leak is the unsanctioned release of confidential information to news media. It may also be the premature publication by a news outlet, of information that it had agreed not to release before a specified time, in violation of a news embargo.

== Types ==
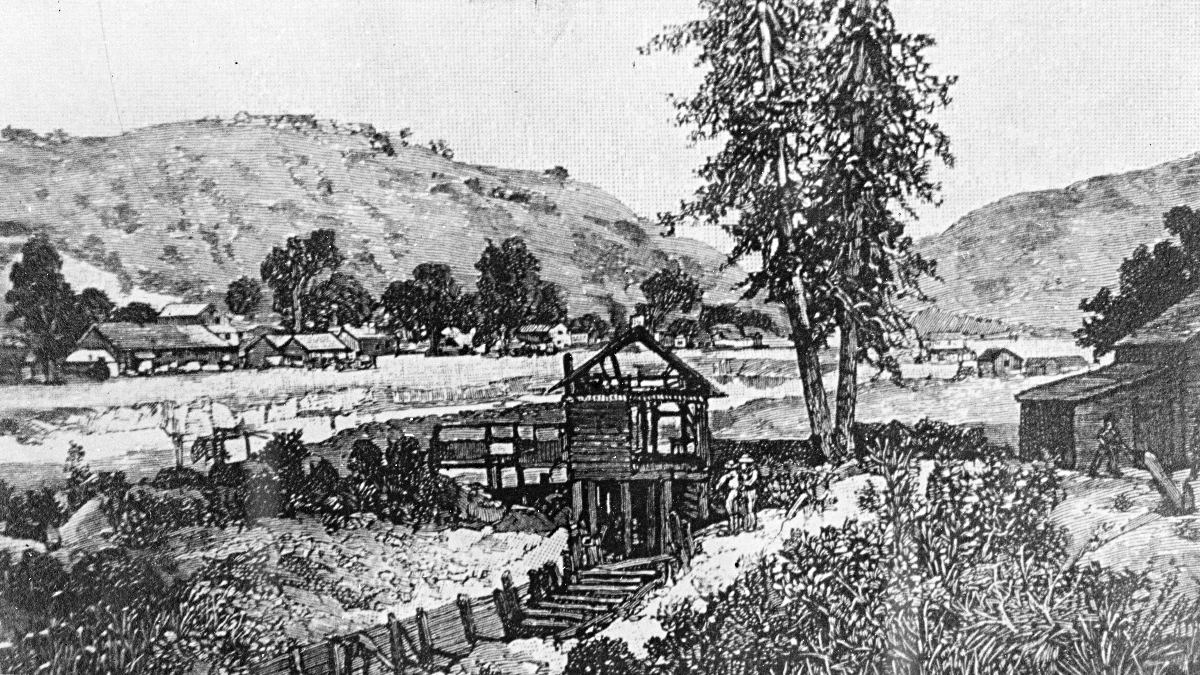
Sutter's Mill, 1851. First Discovery of Gold in California, January 19, 1848. James Marshall's discovery of gold in the South Fork of the American River at Sutter's mill on January 24, 1848, started the great rush of Argonauts to California. Marshall and Captain John Sutter tried their best to keep the discovery of gold quiet until the construction of Sutter's mill was completed, well knowing that the workmen would desert their jobs and turn to digging gold. The news leaked out, and the stampede began.

Leaks are often made by employees of an organization who happened to have access to interesting information but who are not officially authorized to disclose it to the press. They may believe that doing so is in the public interest due to the need for speedy publication, because it otherwise would not have been able to be made public, or to rally opinion to their side of an internal debate. This type of leak is common; as former White House advisor Sidney Souers advised a young scholar in 1957, "there are no leaks in Washington, only plants."

On the other hand, leaks can sometimes be made simply as self-promotion, to elevate the leaker as a person of importance. Leaks can be intentional or unintentional. A leaker may be doing the journalist a personal favor (possibly in exchange for future cooperation), or simply wishes to disseminate secret information in order to affect the news. The latter type of leak is often made anonymously.

Sometimes partial information is released to the media off the record in advance of a press release to "prepare" the press or the public for the official announcement. This may also be intended to allow journalists more time to prepare more extensive coverage, which can then be published immediately after the official release. This technique is designed to maximize the impact of the announcement. It might be considered an element of political "spin", or news management.

Some people who leak information to the media are seeking to manipulate coverage. Cloaking information in secrecy may make it seem more valuable to journalists, and anonymity reduces the ability of others to cross-check or discredit the information.

Some leaks are made in the open; for example, politicians who (whether inadvertently or otherwise) disclose classified or confidential information while speaking to the press.

Leaks can have strong consequences. President Richard M. Nixon was enraged by the existence of leaks, and according to his former staffer William Safire, that rage coupled with the president's lifelong disdain of the press set the environment that led to Nixon's downfall. Most immediately, fear of further leaks after the Pentagon Papers were published in 1971, such as of the Secret Bombing of Cambodia, led to the formation of the "White House Plumbers" unit (so named because they wanted to fix leaks), which conducted the break-in that led to the Watergate scandal and Nixon's eventual resignation in 1974.

== Reasons ==
There are many reasons why information might be leaked. Some of these include:

- Politicians and policy makers may wish to judge the reaction of the public to their plans before committing (a trial balloon). Leaked information may be plausibly denied without blame for proposed unpopular measures affecting their perpetrators.
- People with access to confidential information may find it to their advantage to make it public, without themselves appearing to be responsible for publishing the information. For example, information which will embarrass political opponents, or cause damage to national security, may be leaked.
- People privy to secret information about matters which they consider to be morally wrong or against the public interest — often referred to as "whistleblowers" — may leak the information.
- People may be enticed to expose secret information for other self-serving motives, such as financial gain.

== Role in political communication ==
News leaks can play a major role in political communication by morphing the context in which the public obtains political information. Leaked information mostly gives journalists previously undisclosed material that can influence media coverage. Educators and scholars have noted the role leaks play in democratic governance. This is because it give journalists to report on internal government actions that would otherwise remain hidden to the public.

More often than not journalists serve as mediators between confidential sources and the public, fully contextualizing the leaked information before it is given to the public. Researchers have concluded that reporting on major document leaks creates a political narrative and has influence on how citizens understand political events.

Leaks can also be easily connected to discussions about press freedom and whistle blowing. Investigators have claimed that those that whistleblow mainly relay on journalists to publicize leaked information. This is because this is the main way in which the leaked information the whistleblower gave will actually reach the public eye.

== Notable ==
=== International ===
- The Panama Papers, confidential documents leaked on 3 April 2016 regarding offshore tax havens.
- The Paradise Papers, confidential documents leaked on 5 November 2017 regarding offshore tax havens.
- The FinCEN Files collection of FinCEN documents brought to the public's attention in September 2020.
- The Pandora Papers, confidential documents leaked on 3 October 2021 regarding offshore tax havens.

=== United States ===
- Leaks to the press were commonly made by both sides of the U.S. government's internal debate during August 1949–January 1950 regarding whether to proceed with development of the hydrogen bomb.
- The Pentagon Papers, a top-secret United States Department of Defense history of the United States' political-military involvement in Vietnam from 1945 to 1967. Made public on the front page of the New York Times in 1971.
- A source known as Deep Throat, later identified as FBI Deputy Director Mark Felt, leaked information related to the Watergate scandal to The Washington Post reporter Bob Woodward.
- Columnist Robert Novak published a leak, outing CIA agent Valerie Plame in 2003.
- As reported in the Senate Intelligence Committee report on CIA torture, the CIA deliberately planted false stories with the media to mislead the public, while claiming the stories were leaked.
- The United States diplomatic cables leak of November 2010 in which the organisation WikiLeaks began releasing details of 251,287 US diplomatic cables provided to them by Chelsea Manning.
- The NSA leaks in June 2013, in which NSA employee Edward Snowden leaked secret documents exposing the American PRISM and the British Tempora, clandestine espionage programs.
- The Vault 7 leaks of March 2017 in which the CIA employee Joshua Adam Schulte leaked secret documents exposing the capabilities of the CIA to perform electronic surveillance and cyber warfare.

=== United Kingdom ===
- Spies for Peace, a group of British anti-war activists associated with CND and the Committee of 100 who publicised government preparations for rule after a nuclear war. In 1963 they broke into a secret government bunker where they photographed and copied documents. They published this information in a pamphlet, Danger! Official Secret RSG-6. Four thousand copies were sent to the national press, politicians and peace movement activists.
- The NSA leaks in June 2013, in which NSA employee Edward Snowden leaked secret documents exposing the British Tempora and the American PRISM clandestine espionage programs.

=== Israel ===
- Mordechai Vanunu, an Israeli nuclear technician who revealed details of Israel's nuclear weapons program to the British press in 1986.
- Anat Kamm leaked classified documents from the Israeli Defense Force in 2008, which suggested the Israeli military had been engaged in extrajudicial killings.

=== Spain ===
- At the time of the Spanish coup of July 1936, the takeover of the Spanish Republican Navy by coup leaders failed mainly because the messages calling for a coup against the Spanish Republic were not sent in code, as would have been the norm, from Ciudad Lineal to the senior officers commanding the ships. Navy radiotelegrapher Benjamin Balboa took credit for the news leak.

=== China ===
- Leaked minutes from an internal meeting of China's National Health Commission held on 2022-12-21 revealed that as many as 248 million people in China might have contracted COVID-19 over the first 20 days of December and nearly 37 million people may have been infected on a single day. A copy of the notes were circulated on Chinese social media. The Financial Times said it was Sun Yang – a deputy director of the Chinese Center for Disease Control and Prevention – who presented the figures to officials during the closed-door briefing, citing two people familiar with the matter.
- In November 2019, the International Consortium of Investigative Journalists published the China Cables, consisting of six documents. The documents include a telegram which details the first known "operations manual" for running the Xinjiang re-education camps, including detailed use of predictive policing and AI to target people and regulate life inside the camps.
- Document Number Nine is a confidential internal document widely circulated within the Chinese Communist Party (CCP) in 2013 by the General Office of the CCP. The document warns of seven dangerous Western values, allegedly including media freedom and judicial independence.

== See also ==
- Internet leak
- GlobaLeaks (software)
- Hot mic

== Books and references ==
- Blair Jr., Clay, Silent Victory: The US Submarine War against Japan, Annapolis, MD: Naval Institute Press, 2001
- Lanning, Michael Lee (Lt. Col.), Senseless Secrets: The Failures of U.S. Military Intelligence from George Washington to the Present, Carol Publishing Group, 1995
