= Todd Herman =

American radio host and political adviser

- Born: Todd Eugene Herman; 1966 or 1967 (age 58–59)
- Presenting career
- Show: "The Todd Herman Show" "The Rush Limbaugh Show" (rotating host)
- Station: KTTH
- Show: “The Candy, Mike and Todd Show”
- Station: KIRO-FM
- Country: United States
- Website: thetoddhermanshow.com

Todd Herman is an American radio show host, digital political strategist, and public speaker. He hosted The Todd Herman Show on KTTH in Seattle and was a regular rotating host on The Rush Limbaugh Show. He was co-chief digital strategist for the Republican National Committee 2009 to 2011, and founded several media companies before being a conservative talk radio host.

== Career ==
=== Business ===
Herman was president and chief evangelizing officer of theDial (formerly TheDial.com), a start-up Internet radio company. The company was based in Salt Lake City before moving to Seattle in 1999, when it had 22 staff members. The company was ultimately acquired by Loudeye. Herman then joined Microsoft's MSN, and was involved in the creation of its MSN Video business unit. He held the position of Streaming Media Evangelist at MSNBC.com and then General Manager, Media Strategy and Monetization for MSN. He left Microsoft in September 2007. Herman was founder and chief creative officer for SpinSpotter, a software add-on designed to detect "personal voice, passive voice, biased source, disregarded context, selective disclosure, lack of balance and over-reliance on news releases" in journalism. The company had 14 employees in 2008.

In March 2009, after leaving Microsoft, Herman was hired as Director of New Media for the Republican National Committee (RNC), taking up the job the following month. In that role, he oversaw the national Republican Party's digital strategy. In 2010, Herman posted a personal tweet suggesting that President Barack Obama was a Muslim; the RNC distanced itself from Herman's tweet.

Herman co-founded Crowdverb, a social media monitoring startup, in 2011; it was acquired in 2012 by Washington, D.C.-based Direct Impact, a unit of Burson-Marsteller.

=== Radio ===
In September 2015, Herman became afternoon host at the Seattle conservative talk radio station KTTH (AM 770) in Seattle when Ben Shapiro left the slot open. At KTTH Herman worked alongside other conservative talk show hosts David Boze and Michael Medved.

In January 2019 Herman became co-host (along with Candy Harper and Mike Lewis) of The Candy, Mike and Todd Show on KIRO; the program replaced the Ron and Don Show, which had aired for 13 years. The show ran in the 3 p.m. to 7 p.m. time slot for one year, ending in January 2020. Herman returned to KTTH to host during morning drive time in March 2020, replacing "morning personality" Saul Spady.

Herman has expressed support for the "FairTax," a proposal to abolish income and payroll taxes and replace them with a flat sales tax.

Herman filled in regularly as a guest host on the nationally syndicated Rush Limbaugh Show. In January 2021, while a guest host on Limbaugh's show, Herman suggested that the perpetrators of the U.S. Capitol attack might have been "Antifa" or "BLM". The disinformation circulated widely among Trump supporters. Subsequently, in late February 2021, Herman acknowledged that "it was clear a large group of Trump supporters entered the Capitol and assaulted people" but continued to make the claim that antifa activists had planned to impersonate Trump supporters.

Herman announced his retirement from his KTTH show in November 2021, with the intent to launch a podcast afterward. The podcast will have a more religious focus than his radio show. The radio show ended on December 1, 2021.

In October 2022 Radio America signed a new distribution and sales agreement with Herman's daily podcast and a new weekly Todd Herman Radio Show to launch November 5, 2022. He guest-hosted for The Clay Travis and Buck Sexton Show in 2022.

In January 2023 Herman was added to the line-up of the Seattle talk radio station KVI (570 AM) with a show running Sundays 5 to 7 p.m. plus daily commentary segments for other KVI shows.

As of 2025, Herman hosts The Todd Herman Show, a podcast and syndicated radio program offering Christian conservative perspectives on politics, culture, and other issues. He also hosts A Disciple's View with Todd Herman weekdays on American Family Radio.

== Personal ==
Herman considers himself a "college dropout" and a "lifetime Washingtonian". Herman identifies as a Christian conservative and a disciple of Jesus Christ and "aims for this identity to drive his life".
