= Elaine Quijano =

American journalist

- Born: Elaine Cagas Quijano; 1973 or 1974 (age 52–53); Chicago, Illinois, U.S.
- Education: University of Illinois at Urbana–Champaign
- Occupation: Reporter

Elaine Cagas Quijano is an American television reporter. Formerly with CNN, she was an anchor with CBS News.

== Early life and education ==
Quijano grew up in the Skokie and Morton Grove suburbs of Chicago, Illinois. She is a second-generation Filipina American. Quijano received a bachelor's degree in journalism in 1995 from the University of Illinois at Urbana–Champaign.

== Career ==
Quijano began her career as an intern at WCIA-TV in Champaign, Illinois, in 1994, and later became a reporter, producer, and anchor there. In 1998, Quijano left WCIA to become a general assignment reporter for WFTS-TV in Tampa, Florida.

Quijano was a correspondent for CNN Newsource, an affiliate of CNN, starting in December 2000. She covered the September 11, 2001 attacks and traveled to Kuwait City shortly before the U.S. invasion of Iraq in 2003. She remained in Kuwait for about a month. Quijano also covered the 2003 Space Shuttle Columbia disaster and the Beltway sniper attacks. In 2004, Quijano joined CNN/US as a Washington, D.C.–based general assignment correspondent. She covered The Pentagon, the Supreme Court, the 2004 re-election campaign of President George W. Bush and campaign of vice presidential candidate John Edwards. In 2006, she was named a White House correspondent for CNN. In that role, Quijano covered major stories of the George W. Bush administration, including the war on terror, the unsuccessful bid for comprehensive immigration reform, and the 2008 financial crisis.

Quijano left CNN on December 23, 2009, and joined CBS News in early 2010 as a general assignment reporter.

At CBS News, Quijano is based in New York City. She covered Hurricane Sandy in 2012, the Boston Marathon bombing in 2013, the 2012 Sandy Hook Elementary School massacre, and the 2014 World Cup. Quijano is an anchor for CBSN, the digital streaming network for CBS. Quijano anchored the Sunday edition of CBS Weekend News from 2016 to 2020. Her work has appeared on CBS This Morning and CBS Evening News.

In 2009, Quijano was the convocation speaker at the UIUC College of Media, her alma mater.

In 2016, Quijano was named by the Commission on Presidential Debates (CPD) as the moderator for the vice presidential debate on Tuesday, October 4, at Longwood University in Farmville, Virginia; Quijano thereby became the first Asian American to moderate a U.S. debate for national elected office in the general election, and the youngest journalist to moderate a debate since 1988. It was also the first time a digital network anchor had been selected to moderate a national debate.

She was laid off by CBS in a round of staff cuts on March 20, 2026.

== See also ==
- Filipinos in the New York City metropolitan region
- New Yorkers in journalism
