= Nasty women movement =

2016 feminist movement

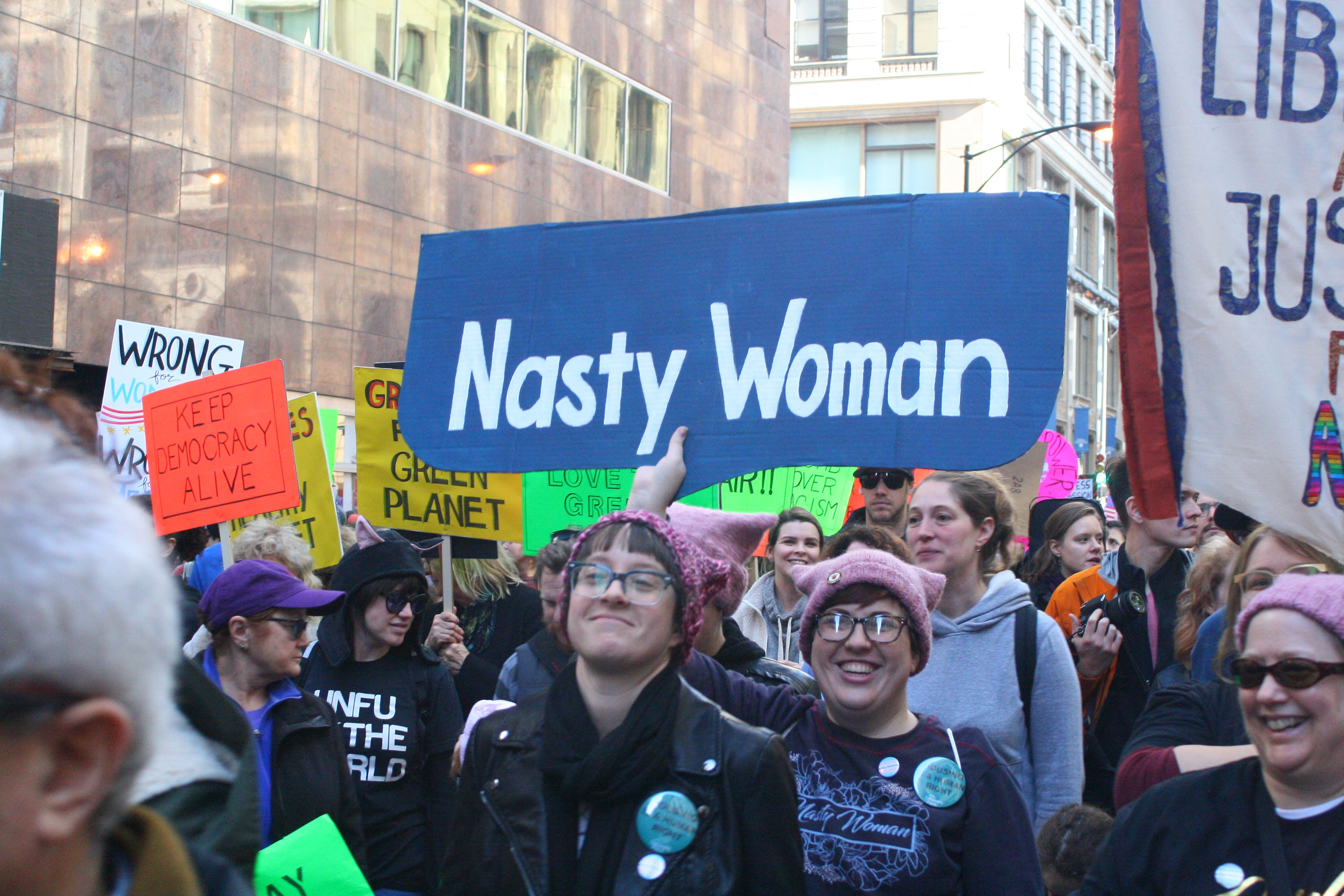
- Demonstrator holding "nasty woman" sign at Women's March, Chicago, January 2017
- Formation: October 19, 2016
- Headquarters: United States

The nasty women movement is a feminist movement that was launched in response to a verbal attack on 2016 US presidential candidate Hillary Clinton by her challenger, Donald Trump, during the third presidential debate. After he called her a "nasty woman", the phrase made worldwide news, becoming a viral phenomenon and call to action for some female voters.

The phrase influenced memes, popular culture, books and magazines, art exhibits, and theater and concert productions, and came to be known as a women's rights rallying cry by some in the media.

== Origin ==
On October 19, 2016, during the final presidential debate, Hillary Clinton said she hoped to improve the Social Security program by increasing taxes on the wealthy, commenting that her own Social Security contributions would accordingly go up along with those of her opponent, Donald Trump, "assuming he can't figure out how to get out of it." Trump responded, "Such a nasty woman." His comment sparked an immediate reaction on various social media platforms, having the biggest response from Twitter. Women, and some men, embraced Trump's insult and turned it into a hashtag. Some users referenced Janet Jackson's 1986 single "Nasty". "Nasty woman" became an international rallying cry for feminist women in defiance of Trump.

== Movement ==
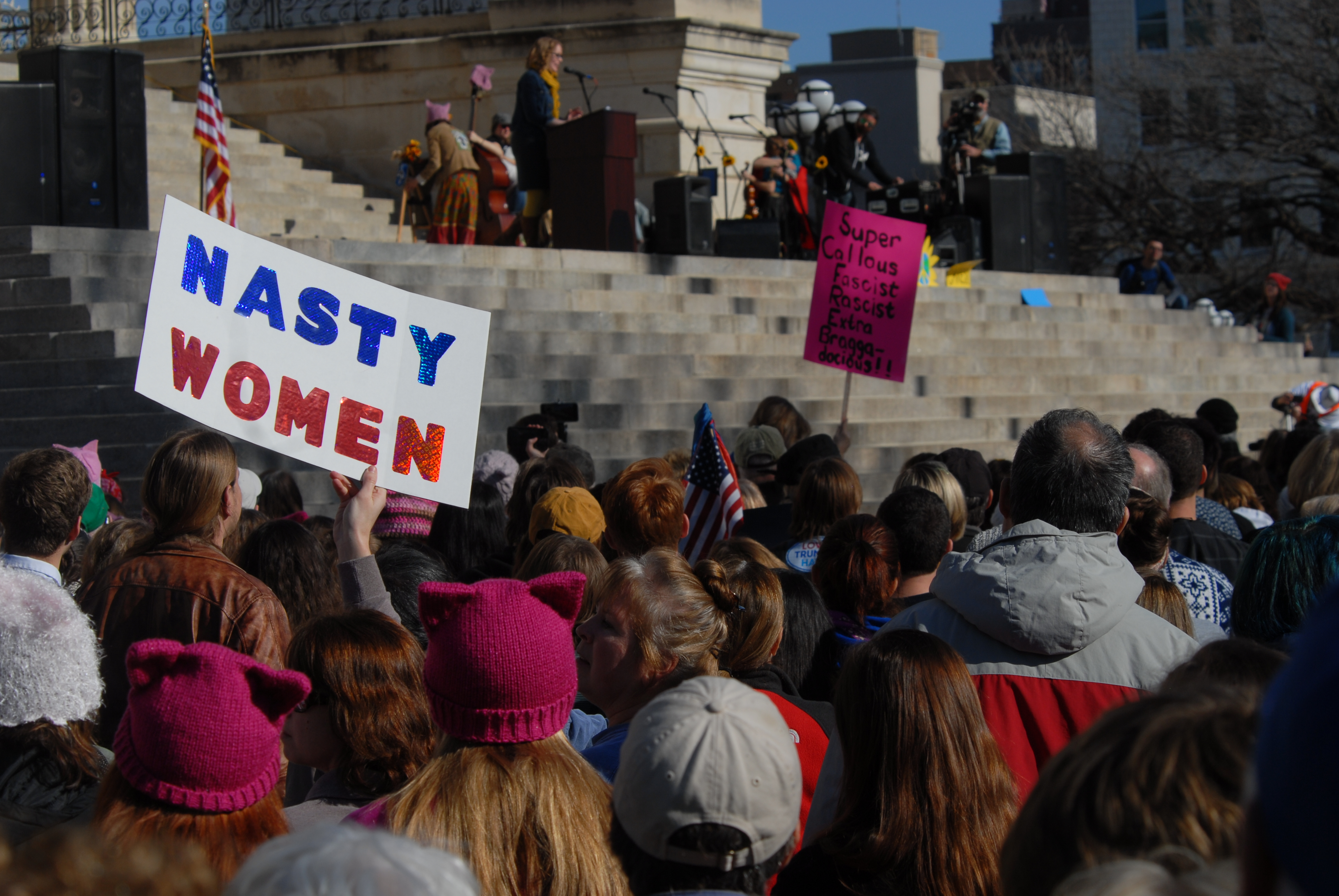
Women's March in Topeka, Kansas, 2017

The nasty woman movement was launched in 2016 in response to the disparaging comment. The phrase has been used by feminists that describe themselves as being "just as nasty – maybe even more nasty – than the woman [Hillary Clinton] Trump had attempted to denigrate, via a weaponized mutter." The term is associated with the goals of the Women's Movement through a poem, "I Am a Nasty Woman", which was recited at the Women's March on Washington. Its intent is to reclaim the pejorative term 'nasty'. "The phrase [nasty woman] became a rallying cry for women everywhere", and it has generated merchandise that bears the term 'nasty woman'. Projects and exhibitions have used the term for their efforts to fundraise for Planned Parenthood. Some celebrities favor the phrase, wearing 'nasty woman' T-shirts and expressing their support. The support was most notable on Twitter, where the phrase was, approvingly, tweeted about.

== Partnerships ==
Various offshoot independent projects from the nasty women movement have raised funds for the organization Planned Parenthood. The fundraising is in direct response to President Donald Trump's conservative anti-abortion agenda to cut federal funding to Planned Parenthood due to their abortion services.

=== Nasty Women Project: Voices from the Resistance ===
Nasty Women Project: Voices from the Resistance is a book compiling a collection of stories from "Nasty Women" around the nation that were affected emotionally or in other ways by the 2016 election that resulted in Donald Trump getting the nomination. The book was published "to fight the threat of misogyny and oppression overtaking our nation" with 100% of the proceeds going directly to funding Planned Parenthood. The book is "not a project to shed the limelight or give the glory to any one person. It is to chronicle and be a reminder of where we have been, where we will go, what we are capable of doing and what we will do, as women, mothers, daughters, sisters, friends." Writers Margaret Atwood, Louise O'Neill, and Nikesh Shukla have voiced their appreciation for The Nasty Women Project.

=== "Nasty Woman" Apparel ===
Sales from the "Nasty Woman" T-shirt, created by Amanda Brinkman and worn by various celebrities and many others involved in the movement, have thus far raised over $130,000 for Planned Parenthood. Google Ghost has since rebranded as Shrill Society and created other products revolving around the Nasty Women Movement, continuing to donate a percentage of all their merchandise sales to charitable organizations. Some of their new merchandise includes a "Year of the Nasty Woman" planner, also known as the "Fuck Trump Action Planner," that features quotes from other female leaders along with ideas of various ways to take action during Trump's presidency. Other independent designers have also created merchandise with portions of the proceeds going to Planned Parenthood.

=== Nasty Women Exhibition ===
Another large contributor is the global art and activism movement Nasty Women, which has held various art exhibits internationally featuring artists from around the world with 100% of the proceeds going directly to Planned Parenthood. One of the projects creators, Roxanne Jackson, explained that the exhibits have an open submission process that accepts "all submitted artwork for this show, regardless of content, as we are focusing on the solidarity of women coming together to object the Trump regime, rather than curating a more typical exhibition." The other co-director of the movement Jessamyn Fiore sees the art exhibit as a demonstration of "the power of our collective strength and determination and creativity and compassion. We will not tolerate any move backwards in time in terms of the policies that affect my body, my health, my quality of life, my freedom." The creators asked artists to price their pieces at $100 or less so anyone can afford them. Fiore explained, "I want audience members who have never bought a work of art before to come to the exhibition and be moved by the experience and fall in love with a piece and think '$30, yeah I can afford that, and I'm helping Planned Parenthood!'" Thus far, the Nasty Women exhibitions have raised over $180,000 for Planned Parenthood.

== Popular culture and reception ==
=== T-shirts, apparel and products ===
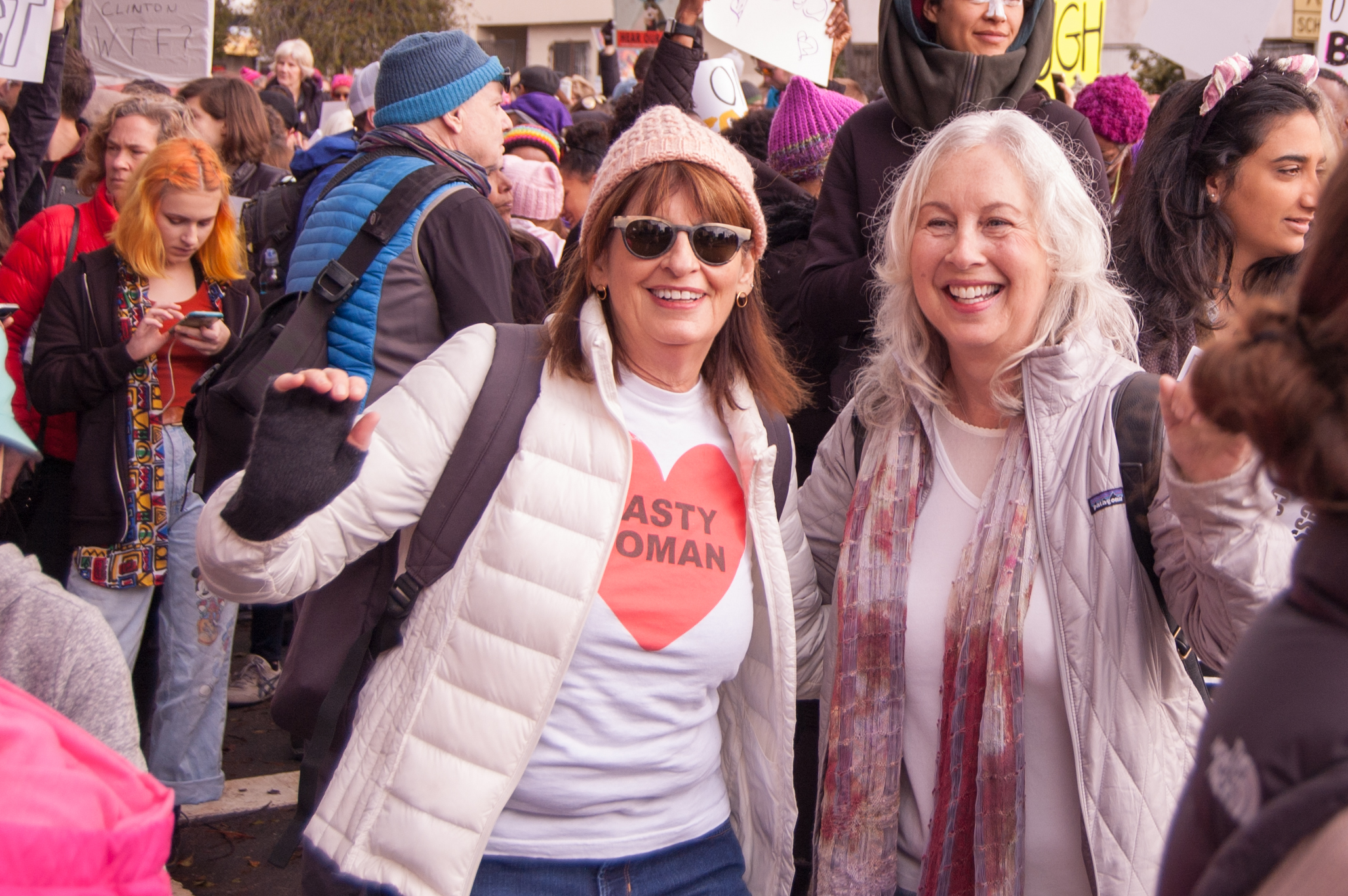
Women's March protest

The Nasty Woman t-shirt designed by Shrill Society was created during the 2016 debate and made available for purchase online, with half of the proceeds pledged to fund Planned Parenthood. The t-shirt went viral and attracted national media attention overnight, with celebrities such as Will Ferrell, Katy Perry, Kristen Bell and Julia Louis-Dreyfus all wearing them publicly and posting their support on social media outlets. The t-shirt quickly became a symbol for the movement.

In July 2017, Samantha Bee's "Nasty Woman Shirt" campaign raised over $1 million for Planned Parenthood. In addition to apparel, other women-owned businesses and brands launched products with philanthropic components. Founded by Meg Hursh Murray in 2016, Nasty Woman Wines produces "unapologetically feminist wines on a mission" donating 20% of net profits to organizations that help drive equality and representation for all. Nasty Woman Lip Gloss produces cruelty-free, vegan cosmetics with a mission of gender quality and proceeds of sales supporting organizations that value of empowerment and equality. Shrill Society created a Nasty Woman Card Game to get players talking about politics, feminism and current events. Published by Penguin Random House, it was released in August 2018.

=== In the media ===
The media has supplied support to the nasty women project with the types of articles written about the subject. BuzzFeed has written several articles about the Nasty Women Project, giving the topic more air in the social media sense. Various media outlets such as NPR, The Huffington Post, The Guardian, and many more, all covered aspects of Nasty Women. Saturday Night Live also performed a skit featuring Nasty Woman and Bad Hombres. The reclaiming of the title "nasty woman" has been viewed in a mostly favorable way by the political left, with Senator Elizabeth Warren using the "nasty woman" quote as a call for women to vote against Trump on election day.

Nina Mariah Donovan, a teenage poetry slam artist, created a poem in response entitled "Nasty Woman" that actress Ashley Judd performed at the 2017 Women's March following Donald Trump's inauguration as President of the United States.

The 2018 science-fiction film Jurassic World: Fallen Kingdom contained an allusion to the quote, the villainous character Ken Wheatley (Ted Levine) describing Dr. Zia Rodriguez (Daniella Pineda) as a "nasty woman".

Rodes Rollins, a singer-songwriter, released "Nasty Woman" in April 2018, "a song centered on the themes of female empowerment and pride".

In the ABC series Scandal, main character Olivia Pope tells future president Melody Grant that anytime a woman is in defiance of a man she will be perceived as a "nasty woman", referencing Donald Trump's comments.

=== "Nasty Woman" on Twitter ===
The #NastyWoman hashtag became popular on social media outlets almost immediately after Donald Trump made the offhanded comment of Hillary Clinton being "such a nasty woman". The hashtag is largely responsible for the immense amount of support and coverage that the movement has gotten. Elizabeth Banks, Jessica Chastain, Chloë Grace Moretz, Denis Leary, Aidy Bryant, Seth Meyers, Yvette Nicole Brown, Patton Oswalt, W. Kamau Bell, and Chelsea Handler have all taken to Twitter to criticize Donald Trump's comments and behavior during the presidential debates, particularly in regard to his "nasty woman" comment.

== See also ==
- Basket of deplorables
- List of nicknames used by Donald Trump
- List of United States political catchphrases
- MeToo movement
- Pussyhat
- Nevertheless, she persisted
- Sleepy Joe (nickname)
- Vast right-wing conspiracy
