= Spin (propaganda) =

Form of propaganda in public relations and politics

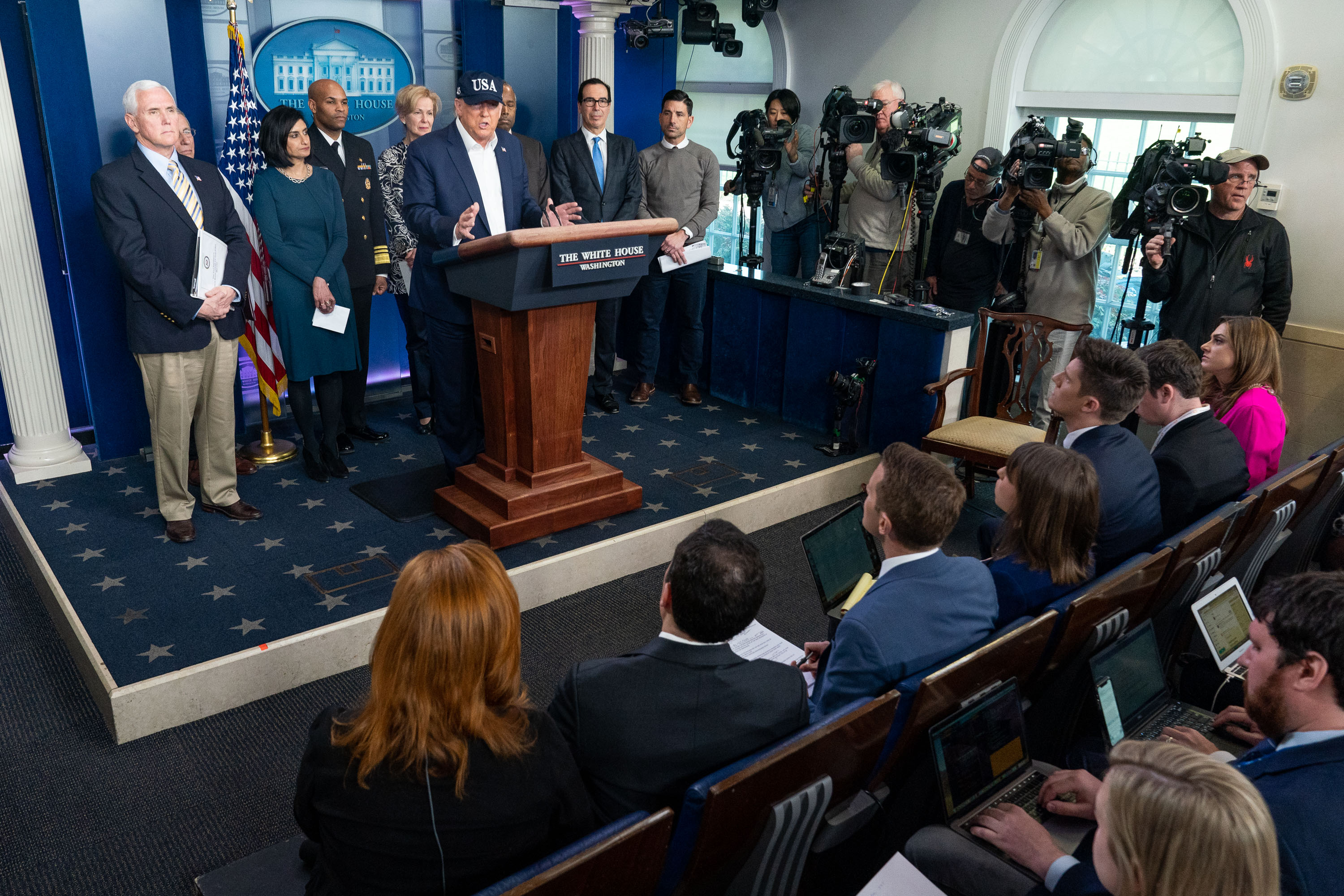
Public figures use press conferences so often as a way to control the timing and specificity of their messages to the media that press conference facilities have been nicknamed "spin rooms".

In public relations and politics, spin is a form of propaganda, achieved through knowingly providing a biased interpretation of an event. While traditional public relations and advertising may manage their presentation of facts, "spin" often implies the use of disingenuous, deceptive, and manipulative tactics.

Because of the frequent association between spin and press conferences (especially government press conferences), the room in which these conferences take place is sometimes described as a "spin room". Public relations advisors, pollsters and media consultants who develop deceptive or misleading messages may be referred to as "spin doctors" or "spinmeisters".

A standard tactic used in "spinning" is to reframe or modify the perception of an issue or event to reduce any negative impact it might have on public opinion. For example, a company whose top-selling product is found to have a significant safety problem may "reframe" the issue by criticizing the safety of its main competitor's products or by highlighting the risk associated with the entire product category. This might be done using a "catchy" slogan or sound bite that can help to persuade the public of the company's biased point of view. This tactic could enable the company to refocus the public's attention away from the negative aspects of its product.

Spinning is typically a service provided by paid media advisors and media consultants. The largest and most powerful companies may have in-house employees and sophisticated units with expertise in spinning issues. While spin is often considered to be a private-sector tactic, in the 1990s and 2000s some politicians and political staff were accused of using deceptive "spin" tactics to manipulate or deceive the public. Spin may include "burying" potentially negative new information by releasing it at the end of the workday on the last day before a long weekend; selectively cherry-picking quotes from previous speeches made by their employer or an opposing politician to give the impression that they advocate a certain position; or purposely leaking misinformation about an opposing politician or candidate that casts them in a negative light.

== History ==
=== Rise of political spin ===
Edward Bernays has been called the "Father of Public Relations". Bernays helped tobacco and alcohol companies make consumption of their products more socially acceptable, and he was proud of his work as a propagandist. Throughout the 1990s, the use of spin by politicians and parties accelerated, especially in the United Kingdom; the emergence of 24-hour news increased pressures placed upon journalists to provide nonstop content, which was further intensified by the competitive nature of British broadcasters and newspapers, and content quality declined due to 24-hour news' and political parties' techniques for handling the increased demand. This led to journalists relying more heavily on the public relations industry as a source for stories, and advertising revenue as a profit source, making them more susceptible to spin.

Spin in the United Kingdom began to break down with the high-profile resignations of the architects of spin within the New Labour government, with Charlie Whelan resigning as Gordon Brown's spokesman in 1999 and Alastair Campbell resigning as Tony Blair's Press Secretary in 2003. As information technology has increased since the end of the 20th century, commentators like Joe Trippi have advanced the theory that modern Internet activism spells the end for political spin, in that the Internet may reduce the effectiveness of spin by providing immediate counterpoints.

=== Examples of spin doctors ===
Spin doctors can either command media attention or remain anonymous. Examples from the UK include Jamie Shea during his time as NATO's press secretary throughout the Kosovo War, Charlie Whelan, and Alastair Campbell.

Campbell, previously a journalist before becoming Tony Blair's Press Secretary, was the driving force behind a government that was able to produce the message it wanted in the media. He played a key role in important decisions, with advisors viewing him as a 'Deputy Prime Minister' inseparable from Blair. Campbell identifies how he was able to spin Rupert Murdoch, during a meeting in July 1995, into positively reporting an upcoming Blair speech, gathering the support from The Sun and The Times, popular British newspapers. Campbell later acknowledged that his and the government's spinning had contributed to the electorate's growing distrust of politicians, and he asserted that spin must cease.

"Spin doctors" such as Shea praised and respected Campbell's work. In 1999, during the beginning of NATO's intervention in Kosovo, Shea's media strategy was non-existent before the arrival of Campbell and his team. Campbell taught Shea how to organise his team to deliver what he wanted to be in the media, which led to Shea being appreciated for his work by President Bill Clinton.

== Techniques ==
Some spin techniques include:

- Selectively presenting facts and quotes that support one's position ("cherry picking"). For example, a pharmaceutical company could choose only two trials where their product shows a positive effect and ignore hundreds of unsuccessful trials, or a politician's staff could handpick short speech quotations from past years which appear to show their candidate's support for a certain position.
- Non-denial denial – Statement that seems to deny an accusation but does not
- Non-apology apology – Purported apology that lacks remorse
- "Mistakes were made" is an example of distancing language, commonly used as a rhetorical device, whereby a speaker acknowledges that a situation was managed inappropriately but evades any direct responsibility. The expression focuses on the action, omitting any actor, via the passive voice, and "mistakes" are framed in an indirect sense that does not imply intent. A less evasive active voice construction would focus on the actor, such as: "I made mistakes" or "John Doe made mistakes."
- Speaking in a way that assumes unproven claims or avoids the question
- "Burying bad news": announcing unpopular things when the media is expected to be focusing on other news. In some cases, governments have released potentially controversial reports on summer long weekends. Sometimes "other news" is deliberately supplied.
- Misdirection and diversion This is when a government leaks a story to the news to limit the coverage of a more damaging story that has been circulating. New Labour used this tactic to reduce the coverage of Foreign Secretary Robin Cook’s affair. This was achieved by leaking a story that a previous Governor of Hong Kong was under investigation by MI6.
- Limited hangout – Espionage jargon
- Rewarding like-minded or amenable journalists with stories. During the Rhodesia crisis of 1964, Harold Wilson formulated a list of journalists that he trusted to write stories that aligned with the government’s opinion.
- Preventing access to journalists or broadcasters that are reporting to the disliking of the spin doctor. An example is the World at One being ignored by New Labour in the build up to the 1997 General election due to an interview they held with Blair that asked difficult questions, leading to interviews being handed to other stations.
- Dead cat strategy
- Astroturfing
- Big lie
- Doublespeak

For years, businesses have used fake or misleading customer testimonials by spinning customers to reflect a much more satisfied experience than was actually the case. In 2009, the Federal Trade Commission updated their laws to include measures to prohibit this type of "spinning" and have been enforcing these laws as of late.

== Impact on elections ==
The extent of the impact of "spin doctors" is contested, though their presence is still recognized in the political environment. The 1997 UK general election saw a landslide victory for New Labour with a 10.3% swing from Conservative to Labour, with help from newspapers such as The Sun towards which Alastair Campbell focused his spinning tactics as he greatly valued their support. The famous newspaper headline 'The Sun Backs Blair' was a key turning point in the campaign which provided New Labour with a lot of confidence and hope of increased electoral support. The change in political alignment had an impact on the electorate, with the number of individuals voting for Labour that read switching newspapers rising by 19.4%, compared to only 10.8% by those that did not read switching newspapers; a study conducted by Ladd and Lenz.

== See also ==
- Managing the news – Media manipulation
- Media manipulation – Techniques in which partisans create an image that favours their interests
- Spin (1995 film)
- Spin Dictators – 2022 political science book
- SpinSpotter – Online service to identify news bias and inaccuracy

== Bibliography ==
- Roberts, Alasdair S. (2005). "Spin Control and Freedom of Information: Lessons for the United Kingdom from Canada" (PDF). Public Administration. 83: 1–23. doi:10.1111/j.0033-3298.2005.00435.x.
- Kathleen Hall Jamieson and Brooks Jackson (2007): unSpun: Finding Facts in a World of Disinformation, (Random House Paperback, ISBN 978-1400065660)
