= SpinSpotter =

Online service to identify news bias and inaccuracy

SpinSpotter was an online service, developed by Seattle-based SpinSpotter Inc., designed to surface specific instances of bias and inaccuracy in any news story online. The service focuses mainly on the major news outlets: CNN, Fox News, MSNBC, The New York Times and Yahoo! News. Users of the service installed a browser toolbar called Spinoculars, which allowed them to see, share, and edit the spin out of any news story. When users noticed a subtle or egregious instance of spin, they would highlight the text within the news article, creating a "Spin Marker", and choose an appropriate "Rule of Spin" from a drop-down menu. The Seven Deadly Spins were: Reporter's Voice, Inaccurate Information, Passive Voice, Biased Source, Disregarded Context, Selective Disclosure, and Lack of Balance.

Users could interact in several ways, including adding a description to someone else's Spin Marker, joining a discussion on a Spin Marker, and voting on the significance of spin within a Spin Marker. Users then established a trust level within the community based on those votes. Votes with a higher impact came from a panel of journalism students and media professionals called "Referees". The service launched in beta form on September 8, 2008. SpinSpotter Inc. was founded by Todd Herman and its chief executive officer was John Atcheson; the company identified them as politically conservative and liberal, respectively.

Epic Ventures was the main corporation supporting SpinSpotter.

== Criticisms ==
In early reaction to the beta release, Language Log concluded that the service appeared to be overly reliant on user input and that its spin-spotting software didn't actually do anything at all. The New York Times reported that there appeared to be few phrases in SpinSpotter's database of spin and that the service's algorithm cannot account for context or tone. Language Log also noted that the service's example of passive voice is not in fact in the passive voice.

== Current status ==
SpinSpotter failed to achieve success. It attracted 30,000 unique visitors in the first month after its launch, but that was down to only 7,000 unique visitors in March 2009. SpinSpotter’s founders shut down the SpinSpotter.com web site that month and subsequently replaced it with SparkWords.com, a site that invites people to post a provocative phrase and follow it with a question, in hopes of generating discussion.
