= Spin room =

Area where press speaks with debate participants

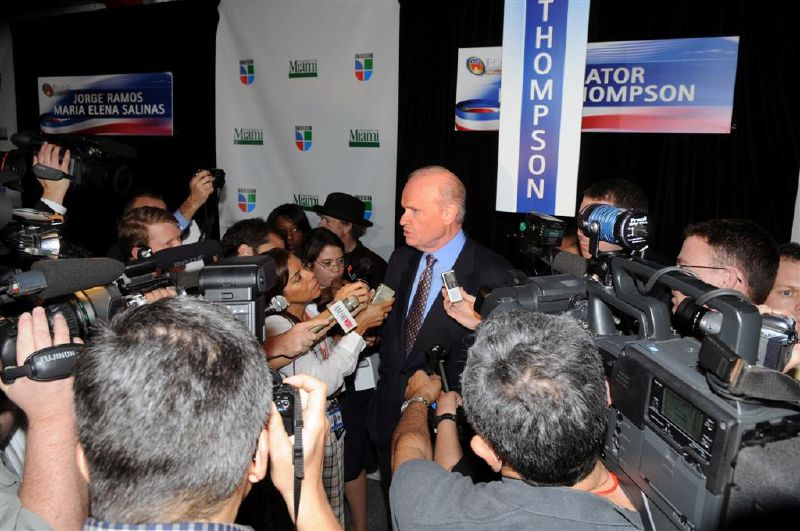
Former U.S. Senator and debate participant Fred Thompson addresses reporters in the spin room following a Republican presidential primary debate in 2007.

In the United States, a spin room, also known as spin row or spin alley, is an area in which reporters can speak with debate participants and/or their representatives after a debate. The name refers to the fact that the participants will attempt to "spin" or influence the perception of the debate among the assembled reporters. The benefit for reporters is that they quickly get in-person interviews with debaters or their representatives, complete with audio, video, and photos. For a U.S. presidential debate, the number of reporters in the spin room can number into the thousands.

== History ==
The earliest recorded spin room was set up by the Reagan Campaign in 1984. In a hotel banquet room, campaign officials spoke on the record with talking points playing up their own candidate's debate performance and minimizing opponent Walter Mondale's success, despite many observers believing Mondale had won. This operation was dubbed the "spin patrol."

== Operation ==
A spin room may also be active before a debate. A common form of pre-debate spin is for each side to try to raise expectations for the opposing debater and lower expectations for their own team, a pursuit known as playing the "expectations game".

During the 2020 U.S. general election debates, in order to reduce person-to-person viral contagion during the COVID-19 pandemic, the physical spin room was entirely supplanted by digital campaign operations and remote interviews with media surrogates while reporters watched the debate from home.

== Criticism ==
Some observers have criticized the overt nature of the media manipulation in spin rooms, and the media's willing participation in it. Defenders have said reporters know it's scripted and aren't persuaded by the spin, but rather, they use the talking points to analyze candidates' strategies. Spin rooms can occasionally include moments of candor, such as when presidential candidate Rick Perry admitted that he had "stepped in it" during a debate response that became known as his "oops" moment.

Spin rooms have also been portrayed as outdated in an era of instant online reaction from all quarters before a debate is even over. Focus groups and instant post-debate "snap polls" attempt to provide a more scientific method than spin rooms in determining who has won a debate.

== See also ==
- Managing the news
- Propaganda
- Framing
- Public relations
