= Managing the news =

Media manipulation

Managing the news is the deliberate influencing of the presentation of information within the news media. The expression managing the news is often used in a negative sense. For example, people or organizations that wish to lessen the publicity concerning bad news may choose to release the information late on a Friday, giving journalists less time to pursue the story. Staying "on message" is a technique intended to limit questions and attention to a narrow scope favorable to the subject.

An example cited by the Communication, Cultural and Media Studies infobase regards a February 1996 Scott Report on arms sales to Iraq. In the United Kingdom, the report was given early to certain officials.

== See also ==
- Propaganda
- Spin (propaganda)

== Sources ==
- News management entry from the Communication, Cultural and Media Studies infobase, part of Cultsock
- Helen Thomas. Watchdogs of democracy?, ISBN 978-0-7432-6781-6. Chapter 5: "Spinning the News".
