= Alan M. Steinman =

American physician and Coast Guard Chief Medical Officer from (1972–1992)

Rear Admiral Alan M. Steinman FACPM
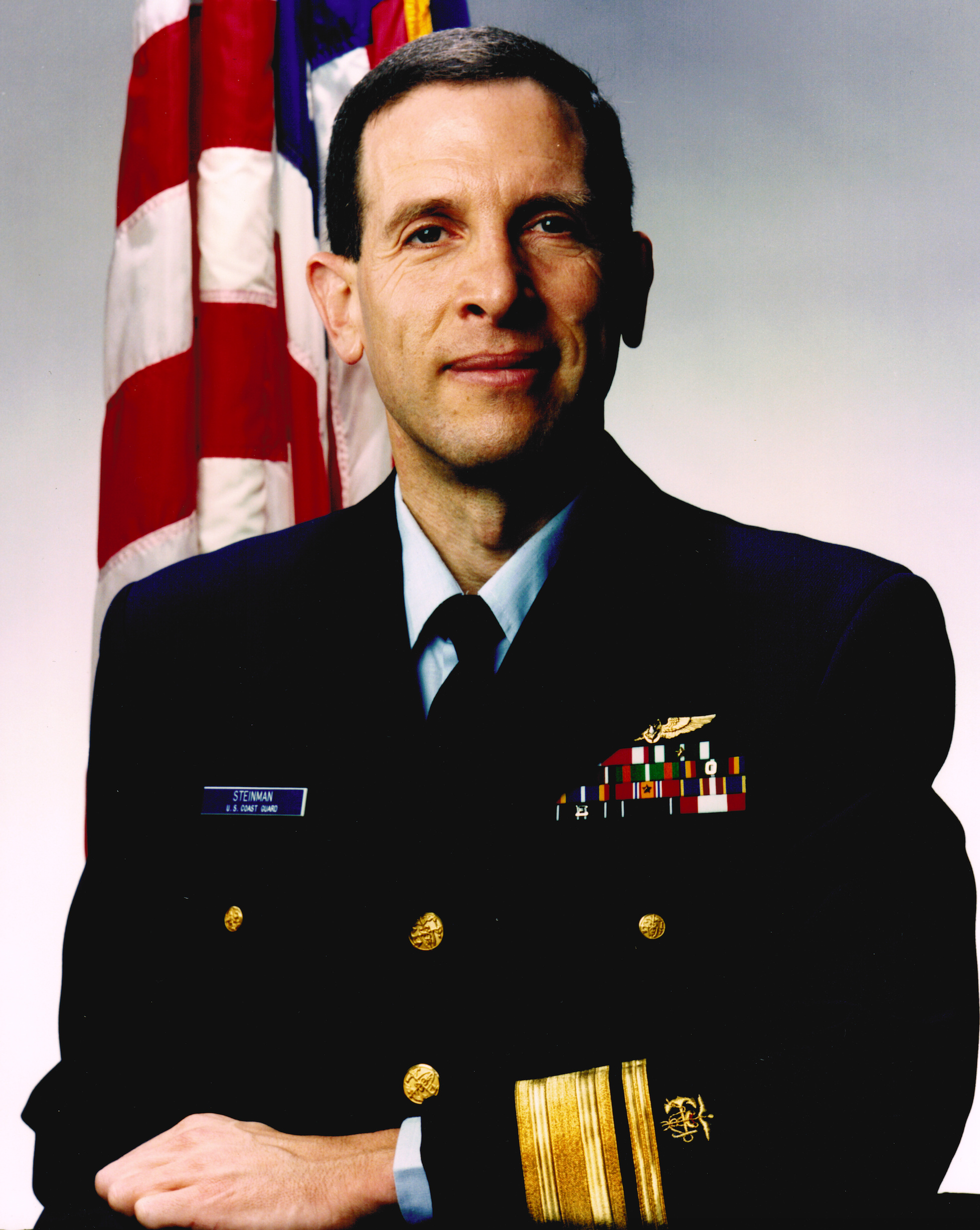
- RADM Steinman in 2013
- Born: 7 February 1945 (age 81); Newark, Ohio
- Military career
- Allegiance: United States of America
- Branch: U.S. Public Health Service Commissioned Corps
- Service years: 1972–1997
- Rank: Rear Admiral
- Commands: Chief Medical Officer of the U.S. Coast Guard; Director of Health and Safety for the U.S. Coast Guard
- Awards: Distinguished Service Medal; Legion of Merit
- Other work: Presidential Special Oversight Board for Department of Defense Investigations of Gulf-War Chemical and Biological Incidents, Transgender Military Service Commission

Alan M. Steinman (born February 7, 1945) is an American physician, retired U.S. Public Health Service Commissioned Corps rear admiral, who served with the U.S. Coast Guard for the majority of his commissioned corps career. His final assignment was serving as the Coast Guard's chief medical officer. (Note: U.S. federal law (42 U.S.C. § 207) states that a U.S. Public Health Service Commissioned Corps officer, while assigned as the chief medical officer of the United States Coast Guard, shall have the grade corresponding with the grade of major general. The equivalent rank to major general in the U.S. Public Health Service Commissioned Corps is rear admiral.) Steinman is expert in sea survival, hypothermia and drowning, and an advocate for the open service of LGBT people in the U.S. military.

== Early life and education ==
Born in Newark, Ohio, Steinman moved to Los Angeles with his family as a young boy. His father was a chemist and chemical plant owner and his mother was a housewife. Steinman earned a Bachelor of Science degree from the Massachusetts Institute of Technology in 1966 and his medical degree from Stanford University in 1971. Following medical school Steinman completed an internship at the Mayo Clinic. Steinman also has a Master of Public Health degree from the University of Washington.

== Career ==
Attracted by the Coast Guard's image as the country's "premier search and rescue agency" he joined the U.S. Public Health Service in order to pursue his interests in emergency medicine. Steinman received his commission in the U.S. Public Health Service Commissioned Corps as a lieutenant and was assigned to the U.S. Coast Guard in July 1972. Following graduation from the U.S. Navy's aerospace medicine school at NAS Pensacola in 1973, Steinman qualified and served as a Coast Guard flight surgeon.

As part of his duties as a flight surgeon, Steinman participated in numerous rescues at sea of ill and injured personnel. These occasionally required him to be lowered and recovered from vessels at sea by a helicopter rescue basket. With the exception of Coast Guard Base Kodiak, Steinman was the lone physician on staff at all of his field duty stations. During his time on active duty with the Coast Guard, Steinman was instrumental in establishing the Coast Guard's system of emergency medical services, including the establishment of the Coast Guard EMT School at Petaluma, California. He also established the Coast Guard Wellness Program, emphasizing good nutrition, physical fitness and avoidance of tobacco products.

Steinman is best known, however, for his research into sea-survival, hypothermia and drowning, publishing numerous scientific articles and book chapters and making numerous presentations at medical and search and rescue conferences on these topics. In 1989, the Aerospace Medical Association awarded Steinman its annual Arnold D. Tuttle Award in recognition of " 'his extraordinary series of studies which characterized the protective properties of antiexposure suits under real-world conditions,' culminating in the 1987 publication in Aviation, Space, and Environmental Medicine of 'Immersion hypothermia: comparative protection of anti-exposure garments in calm vs. rough seas.' " Steinman also co-developed an underwater escape breathing device and anti-exposure garment for use by helicopter crews and "a heated, humidified oxygen system for treating hypothermic patients."

In 1993, Steinman was selected for promotion to flag officer in the commissioned corps and assignment as the Coast Guard Director of Health and Safety. Steinman retired from the U.S. Public Health Service in 1997 and later served on the Presidential Special Oversight Board for Department of Defense Investigations of Gulf War Chemical and Biological Incident investigating Gulf War syndrome. Steinman is a Fellow of the American College of Preventive Medicine.

His military awards and citations include the Distinguished Service Medal and the Legion of Merit.

- Coast Guard Distinguished Service Medal
- Legion of Merit
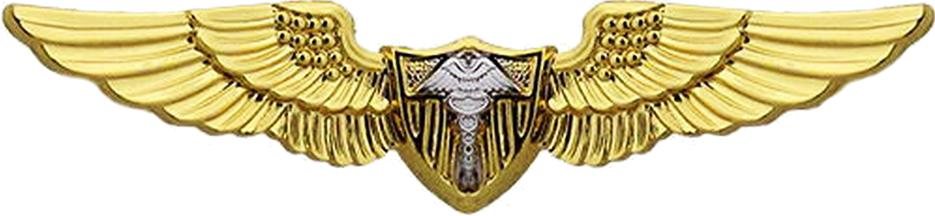
- Coast Guard Flight Surgeon Badge

== Advocacy ==
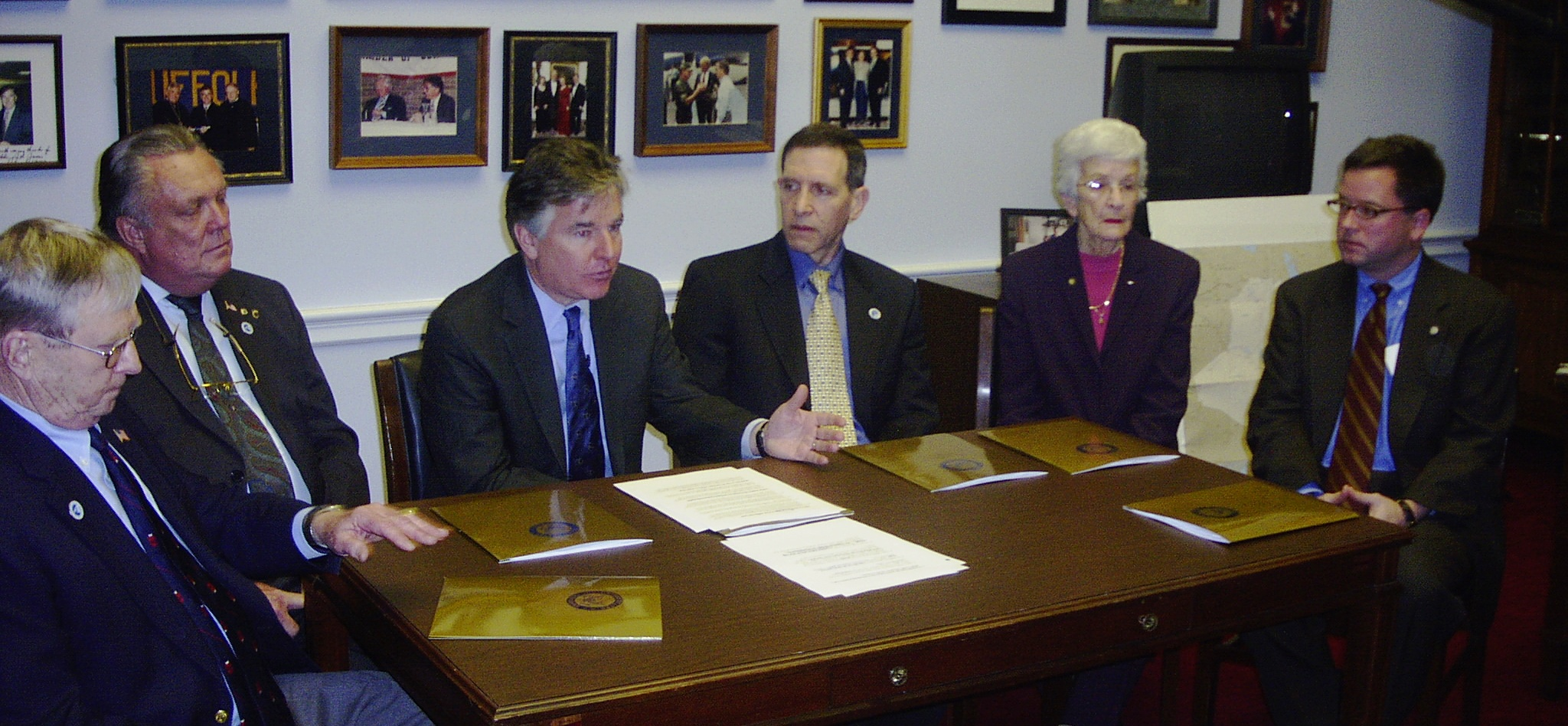
US Rep. Marty Meehan (3rd from left) is joined in a 2005 photo by RADM Alan M. Steinman (4th from left) and other retired flag officers supporting the repeal of DADT.

After his retirement, Steinman came out publicly as a gay man in a 2003 New York Times news article featuring Brigadier General Keith Kerr (CSMR, ret.) and Brigadier General Virgil A. Richard (USA, ret.). The three flag officers were made available to the Times by the Servicemembers Legal Defense Network in a move timed to coincide with the tenth anniversary of the Clinton administration's "Don't ask, don't tell" (DADT) policy concerning U.S. military service by gays and lesbians. At the time, Kerr, Richard, and Steinman were the highest-ranking members of the military to publicly acknowledge being gay and they did so in an attempt to foment dialogue with the aim of getting DADT changed.

In 2008, Steinman joined 103 other generals and admirals in signing an open letter calling upon President-elect Barack Obama to end DADT and allow gays and lesbians to serve openly in the U.S. military. In 2014, Steinman joined with former US Surgeon General Jocelyn Elders to co-chair the Transgender Military Service Commission, sponsored by the Palm Center. Among other things, the Commission found: "There is no compelling medical rationale for banning transgender military service, and medical regulations requiring the discharge of all transgender personnel are inconsistent with how the military regulates medical and psychological conditions." The commission's final report was published in the journal Armed Forces & Society. An earlier version of the report was published online by the Palm Center.

== Select publications ==
=== As lead or sole author ===
- Steinman, A; Giesbrecht, G (Spring 2011). "The four stages of cold-water immersion" (PDF). On Scene: The Journal of USCG Search and Rescue: 21. ISSN 0093-2124. Archived from the original (PDF) on 27 September 2012.
- Steinman, Alan M (2008). Hypothermia, Drowning, and Cold-Water Survival (PDF). Passenger Vessel Safety Specialists (PVSS). Archived from the original (PDF) on 8 Oct 2008.
- Steinman, AM (1987). "Adverse Effects of Heat and Cold on Military Operations: History and Current Solutions". Mil Med. 152 (8): 389–92. doi:10.1093/milmed/152.8.389. PMID 3116456.
- Steinman, AM; Hayward, JS; Nemiroff, MJ; Kubilis, PS (1987). "Immersion hypothermia: comparative protection of anti-exposure garments in calm vs. rough seas". Aviat Space Environ Med. 58 (6): 550–558. PMID 3606516.
- Steinman, AM (1986). "Cardiopulmonary Resuscitation and Hypothermia". Circulation. 74 (6 pt. 2): 32–35. PMID 3536162.
- Steinman, Alan M; Nemiroff, Martin J; Hayward, John S; Kubilis, Paul S (1985). A Comparison of the Protection Against Immersion Hypothermia Provided by Coast Guard Anti-Exposure Clothing in Calm versus Rough Seas (PDF) (Technical report). Washington DC: USCG Office of Research and Development. CG-D-17-85. Archived (PDF) from the original on February 15, 2017.
- Steinman, AM (1983). "The Hypothermic Code. CPR Controversy Revisited". JEMS. 8 (10): 32–35. PMID 10263356.
- Steinman, AM; Parris, L (1977). "Immersion hypothermia". Emerg Med Serv. 6 (4): 24–25. PMID 10236313.
- Steinman, AM; Smerin, SE; Barchas, JD (1969). "Epinephrine metabolism in mammalian brain after intravenous and intraventricular administration". Science. 165 (3893): 616–617. Bibcode:1969Sci...165..616S. doi:10.1126/science.165.3893.616. PMID 5794397. S2CID 35843968.

=== As other co-author ===
- Giesbrecht, GG; Steinman, AM (2016). "Immersion in Cold Water". In Auerbach, Paul S. (ed.). Wilderness Medicine (7th ed.). St. Louis: C.V. Mosby. ISBN 978-0-323-35942-9.
- Ducharme, MB; Steinman, AM; Giesbrecht, GG (2014). "Pre-hospital Management of Immersion Hypothermia". In Bierens, JJLM; et al. (eds.). Drowning: Prevention, Rescue, Treatment (2nd ed.). Heidelberg: Springer-Verlag. pp. 875–880. doi:10.1007/978-3-642-04253-9_135. ISBN 978-3-642-04252-2.
- Bhupinder, JKS; Sran, BPT; McDonald, GK; Steinman, AM; Gardiner, PF; Giesbrecht, GG (2014). "Comparison of heat donation through the head or torso on mild hypothermia rewarming". Wilderness and Environmental Medicine. 25 (1): 4–13. doi:10.1016/j.wem.2013.10.005. hdl:1993/18298. PMID 24412657.
- Lockhart, Tamara L; Jamieson, Christopher P; Steinman, Alan M; Giesbrecht, Gordon G (2005). "Life jacket design affects dorsal head and chest exposure, core cooling, and cognition in 10 °C water". Aviat Space Environ Med. 76 (10): 954–962. PMID 16235879.
- Collis, ML; Steinman, AM; Chaney, RD (1977). "Accidental hypothermia: an experimental study of practical rewarming methods". Aviat Space Environ Med. 48 (7): 625–632. PMID 883932.
- Hayward, JS; Steinman, AM (1975). "Accidental hypothermia: an experimental study of inhalation rewarming". Aviat Space Environ Med. 46 (10): 1236–1240. PMID 1180782.
- Barchas, JD; Ciaranello, RD; Steinman, AM (1969). "Epinephrine formation and metabolism in mammalian brain". Biol Psychiatry. 1 (1): 31–48. PMID 5367319.
