= Tommy Thompson 2008 presidential campaign =

Unsuccessful 2008 presidential campaign

Tommy 2008
- Campaign: U.S. presidential election, 2008
- Candidate: Tommy Thompson; Governor of Wisconsin (1987–2001); Secretary of Health and Human Services (2001–2005)
- Affiliation: Republican Party
- Headquarters: Alexandria, VA
- Key people: Darrin Schmitz (Director); Rodman Hise (Treasurer); Phil Prange (Finance Director); Brian Dumas (Consultant); Steve Grubbs (Adviser)
- Receipts: US$.890398 (2007-06-30)

Website
- http://www.tommy2008.com

The Tommy Thompson presidential campaign of 2008 began when the former Wisconsin Governor and Secretary of Health and Human Services Tommy Thompson announced his candidacy for the Republican Party nomination for President of the United States on April 1, 2007. Thompson centered his campaign in Iowa, where he had spent the previous year building an organization in anticipation of the Ames straw poll. Throughout the campaign, Thompson remained low in Republican opinion polls and garnered very few political endorsements and campaign donations. He dropped out of the race on August 12, 2007, following a sixth-place finish at Ames.

For his campaign, Thompson focused primarily on the issues of health care reform and the War in Iraq. He campaigned almost exclusively in Iowa but did participate in four nationally televised presidential debates. Political gaffes and health issues beset the campaign. After his withdrawal, Thompson endorsed Rudy Giuliani for president and backed John McCain once Giuliani exited the race. Four years later, Thompson unsuccessfully ran for U.S. Senate in Wisconsin as the Republican nominee.

== Background ==
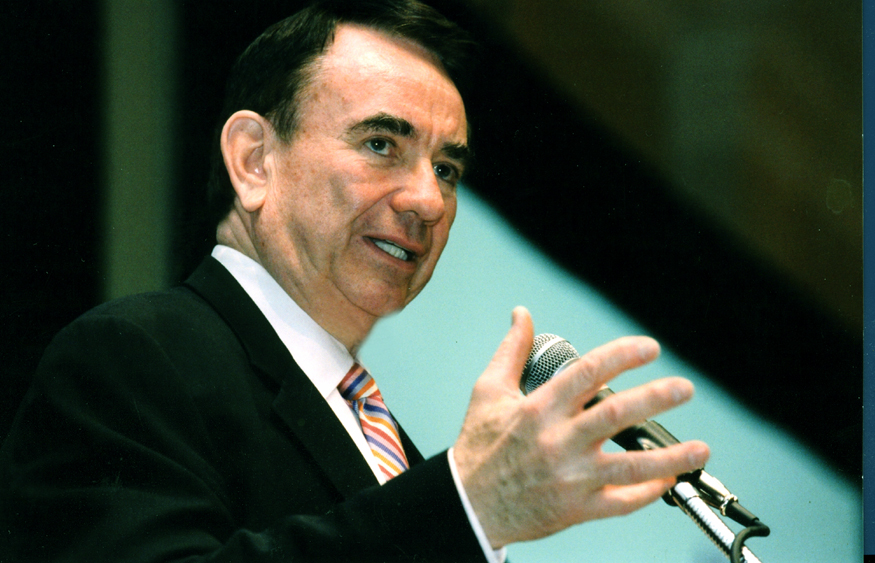
Thompson at the 2004 HealthierUS summit

Tommy Thompson's political career began in 1966 upon his election to the Wisconsin State Assembly after graduating from law school at University of Wisconsin–Madison. While in the assembly, he received the nickname of "Dr. No" for blocking legislation through parliamentary procedure. He was named assistant minority leader of the body in 1973 and became minority leader in 1981. He unsuccessfully ran for United States Congress in 1979, losing in the Republican primary to Tom Petri.

Thompson was elected Governor of Wisconsin in 1986. He was re-elected three times. During his tenure, he successfully pushed for welfare reform through Wisconsin Works, a workfare program. Welfare participation decreased by 90% under the program. Thompson also successfully backed a school voucher program. Near the end of his governorship, Thompson implemented BadgerCare, which provided health coverage for children ineligible for Medicaid. As governor, Thompson vetoed bills frequently and often exercised the line-item veto. None of his vetoes were overturned. Thompson served as chairman of the National Governors Association from 1995 to 1996. He was considered as a potential running mate for Republican presidential nominee Bob Dole in 1996, but was passed over for Jack Kemp. Thompson left as governor during his fourth term in 2001 to serve as Secretary of Health and Human Services in the George W. Bush administration.

As Secretary of Health and Human Services, Thompson introduced measures to increase funding for the National Institutes of Health and reorganized the Centers for Medicare and Medicaid Services. His position attained a unique significance following the attacks of 9/11 and the subsequent anthrax attacks. He was responsible for national preparedness in the event of bioterrorism. Though he wished to resign from the position in 2003, Bush asked that he stay on for the rest of Bush's first term. Thompson announced his resignation at a press conference in December 2004 in which he surprisingly admitted, "I, for the life of me, cannot understand why the terrorists have not attacked our food supply." He officially left the position in January 2005 and began work in the private sector.

== Exploration ==
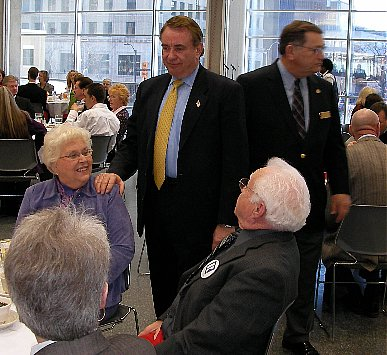
Thompson visits Des Moines in February 2007

Beginning in 2006, Thompson spent every weekend in Iowa to build an organization for his potential presidential run. He opened an exploratory committee on November 16, 2006, to test the waters, stating that "The times are right for my ideas." He hired Rodman P. Hise as the treasurer of the committee, and gained the assistance of former advisers from his previous campaigns, including fundraiser Phil Prange, and former press secretary Darrin Schmitz, who was eventually hired as political director. A Washington Post-ABC News poll placed Thompson at 2% in December 2006. He fell to 1% in January 2007, but climbed back to 2% the following month.

As his eventual entrance neared, Thompson spent additional time in Iowa and announced that his campaign strategy would focus on the state and its nonbinding straw poll held in August. Former Iowa State Representative Steve Grubbs was added as the campaign's consultant for the state. Grubbs had planned to work on the presidential campaign of Senator George Allen, but his usage of an offensive term prevented him from entering the race. Though Thompson was not yet considered a "viable candidate", Grubbs felt that the frontrunners John McCain, Rudy Giuliani and Mitt Romney were unacceptable to the Republican base. He believed that Thompson "had more experience" than any other candidate, and could unify the party.

In order to be a "viable candidate", Cook Political Report editor Jennifer Duffy commented that Thompson would have to raise at least $35 to $50 million by June. He raised $314,000 in the first quarter of 2007.

== On the campaign trail ==
=== Announcement ===
Thompson officially entered the race on April 1, 2007, following the announcement that he would seek the Republican Party's nomination for president during an interview on This Week with George Stephanopoulos. He branded himself as a reliant conservative whose campaign was "looking good" due to the base he was attempting to establish in Iowa. The state would hold the nation's first presidential caucus in January 2008. His entrance into the race slightly increased voter's recognition of "Thompson" in polls but pollsters stated that this increase was most likely attributed to the exposure of potential candidate Fred Thompson. He remained at 2% in presidential polls, in sixth place overall behind potential candidates Newt Gingrich and Fred Thompson, but ahead of declared candidates Ron Paul, Jim Gilmore, Tom Tancredo, Sam Brownback, Duncan Hunter and Mike Huckabee. Statewide polls placed Thompson at 24% in his home state of Wisconsin, which was considerably higher than the marks achieved by other lower tiered candidates in their home states. Upon his entrance, the candidate set forth his position on the War in Iraq, holding that as president, he would allow Iraqis to vote on whether or not the United States military should remain in the nation. He stated that if the Iraqis "don't want us there...we should get out."

=== April 2007 ===
Thompson first hit the trails in Iowa. His strategy in the state was to spend more time there than any other candidate, emphasizing that he "intend[ed] to win Iowa" because of his midwest roots. He commented on fiscal responsibility at an event in a Des Moines suburb stating that "Republicans went to Washington and we lost our way" because "we tried to spend [money] like Democrats." He introduced a health care platform that emphasized prevention and called for reforms in the current system to ensure that all Americans be covered in the future. In the financial sphere of the campaign, Thompson acknowledged that he could not compete with funds being raised by the upper-tiered candidates, but he stated that he did not intend to do so because his campaign was "different" than the others; according to Thompson, his was more centered around a strong ground organization in Iowa.

Thompson was criticized when he stated at a Jewish event that he believed earning money is "part of the Jewish tradition." Later at the event he stated that he was not trying to "imply anything about Jews and finances" but that he was "compliment[ing]" Jews for being "outstanding business people." His spokesman later said that he had "misspoke." Despite this setback, the campaign was given a boost later in the month when columnist George Will wrote in an editorial that Thompson was the "Republican presidential candidate with perhaps the most impressive résumé." He finished April campaigning in Iowa continuing with the strategy he planned.

=== May 2007 ===
Thompson began May at the first Republican debate at the Ronald Reagan Presidential Library in Simi Valley, California sponsored by MSNBC on May 3. During the debate, he again voiced his support for an Iraqi vote, and included the plan's second phase if the Iraqis chose for American forces to remain in the nation. He stated that the oil revenues could have been split and a system of federalism could have been established. When asked about abortion, Thompson stated that he believed its legalization should be left up to the individual states, disagreeing with the precedent set in Roe v. Wade. He was also given the opportunity to discuss his governorship of Wisconsin, highlighting his record of 1,900 vetoes and the overall cutting of taxes by $16.4 billion. On the subject of taxes, he articulated his support for the option of a flat tax for the taxpayer, if it was to their benefit. At the end of the debate, Thompson differentiated himself from President George W. Bush stating that as president he would "transform the health care system" and settle the situation in Iraq.

A comment he made during the debate became another campaign issue for Thompson. He again apologized for remarks, this time over an answer to a question in which he stated that he believed the decision to fire a gay worker based on the morals of the employer is something that should be "left up to the individual business." A few days following the debate, the candidate rescinded the comments, and blamed the gaffe on a malfunctioning hearing aid, stating that he "didn't hear the question." Thompson also said that he was sick during the debate, having been hospitalized three days earlier with the flu and bronchitis, and that all he could think about "was getting off the stage." Campaign adviser Steve Grubbs would later point to this episode as the moment Thompson's campaign became "unrecoverable." Thompson was harshly criticized for the remarks. Jason Stephany, the political director of the Democratic Party of Wisconsin, rhetorically asked "How many times is he going to say something that's completely offensive to the majority of Americans before people start to say, 'What's going on here?'" Thompson tried to reassure the public that there was "nothing discriminatory about [himself] at all." Afterwards, he finished second in a poll of state convention members from Wisconsin, with 84 of the 306 members polled, trailing Fred Thompson who received 95 votes. He stood at 16% in an average of statewide polls for the state in May, and stood at 4.3% in Iowa, where he based his campaign.

Thompson participated in the May 15 GOP debate, where he discussed his insistence to trim bureaucracy in the federal government, and his support for the advancements made in stem cell research, lauding the achievements of his alma mater University of Wisconsin–Madison in the field. He was asked what he would do in the event of a looming preemptive attack against a hypothetical anti-American nation promoting terrorism. The candidate quoted former Secretary of State Colin Powell reflecting the need to be sure the intelligence was correct, to deploy the right number of troops and to make sure that an exit strategy was planned. Following the debate, Thompson campaigned in New Hampshire before taking a break for the rest of the month.

=== June 2007 ===
After a day of campaigning in Iowa, Thompson returned to New Hampshire to participate in the June 5 GOP Debate. He discussed the issue of illegal immigration, arguing that the border should be secured before passing Comprehensive Immigration Reform. He later commented that once the border was secured, "there should be no amnesty" for illegal immigrants and that the proposed Comprehensive Immigration Reform Act of 2007 was "an amnesty bill", which he opposed. When asked about the potential candidate of his namesake, Thompson responded by saying "if you’re talking about a reliable conservative, it is THIS Thompson —Tommy Thompson, not the actor (Fred Thompson)." After being questioned about the biggest mistake of the George W. Bush presidency, as a former member of the cabinet Thompson responded:

We went to Washington to change Washington and Washington changed us. We didn’t come up with new ideas. We got to transform health care. We got to wind — we got to wind down the war in Iraq. We got to make sure that we really are conservatives. If we’re going to spend money like — as foolishly and as stupidly as the Democrats, the voters are going to vote for the professional spending, the Democrat not the amateur spender, the Republican.

He later joked that "I would certainly not send him to the United Nations." Following the debate, Thompson continued his criticism of the Bush administration. While campaigning in New Hampshire, he stated that he "would be a much more open president" than Bush. He criticized the handling of the Iraq War as "a terrible mistake" and assessed the president as "very cloistered... [with] very few inner-circle people."

A few days later, Thompson sent out an e-mail alerting the press about a conference call where he would make major announcement about the campaign. Though some speculated that Thompson would drop out of the race during the call, he instead announced his intentions to participate in the Ames Straw Poll. The move reaffirmed his strategy of relying on the straw poll to propel him from the lower tier, despite moves by the campaigns of Rudy Giuliani and John McCain to withdraw from the event. Drake University political science professor Dennis Goldford analyzed the straw poll strategy and commented that if Thompson "didn't make some sort of substantive showing" it would be hard for his money flow to continue.

In late June, the three Republican Representatives from Wisconsin commented on Thompson's campaign. Though Representative Tom Petri identified himself as a supporter and hailed Thompson for doing "a lot for the country and the state and the Republican Party of Wisconsin" he called Thompson "a long shot" and stopped short of endorsing him. Representative Jim Sensenbrenner described Thompson's campaign as "anemic" and Representative Paul Ryan commented that "I think a lot of us are hoping the best for Tommy and are wishing him well but are just sort of watching the field to see how it materializes." Other Republicans wondered if Thompson was running just to "get it out of his system." Strategist Mark Graul argued that the former governor "had a profound impact" on party members in Wisconsin, which had created a familiarity complex that caused people to say "'Oh, come on'" after hearing of his run. Despite the qualms, spokesman Steve Grubbs remarked that Thompson wants "for people to give him a chance...[because] he knows he has a lot to prove, and he is working 90 hours a week to prove it." A Strategic vision poll of Iowa voters placed Thompson in fifth place among the candidates, with only 6 percent support. To improve his standing ahead of the Ames Straw Poll, Thompson planned to escalate his Iowa campaign after July 4 in a swing labeled the "Common Sense Solutions Tour". Communications director Rennick Remley remarked that despite low amounts of capital, Thompson would spend "scads of time in Iowa in July." He compared Thompson's strategy to Jimmy Carter's 1976 "retail politics" strategy that led to victory in the Iowa caucuses.

To close the month, Thompson campaigned in Iowa, and made a brief stop in New Hampshire on June 25. On June 26, he won the Linn County straw poll at Kirkwood Community College in Cedar Rapids.

=== July 2007 ===
In July, Thompson campaigned extensively in Iowa, hoping to gain traction before the Ames Straw poll. As planned, he began his "Common Sense Solutions Tour" after the July 4 holiday, and traveled throughout Iowa in an ethanol-fueled Winnebago. After Mitt Romney embarked on a similar campaign bus tour, Thompson accused Romney of "copying" his idea. Thompson's first stop of the month was scheduled in Ames on the evening of July 6, but he was unable to make the event due to plane malfunction. He instead opened his tour in Webster City on July 7.

During one stop on the first leg of his "Common Sense Solutions Tour", Thompson made a bold promise. He proclaimed that if elected president, his administration would eliminate breast cancer by 2015. Once accomplished, he planned to "then attack every major cancer one after the other." Thompson explained that the disease had afflicted his family as well as millions of others and stated that "there's no candidate in either party more prepared and more motivated to lead this effort than me." He compared the announcement to President Kennedy's pledge to put a man on the moon before the end of the 1960s. The plan consisted of increases in funding for cancer research, including a doubling of the National Institute of Health's budget and additional incentives for private medical professionals to find a cure. Furthermore, Thompson remarked that as part of the plan, he would travel the world to promote cures, improving the United States' international standing. David Miller of CBS News questioned whether the announcement was "a desperate measure by a desperate candidate, or a well-thought out policy by a former Health and Human Services secretary." He added, "we can't say for sure, but this item is proof that it did succeed in drawing attention to the other Thompson in the race."

After eight straight days of campaigning, Thompson concluded the first leg of his tour on July 14. Like all other Republican presidential candidates except Congressman Tom Tancredo, Thompson chose to skip the July 12 presidential debate sponsored by the NAACP.

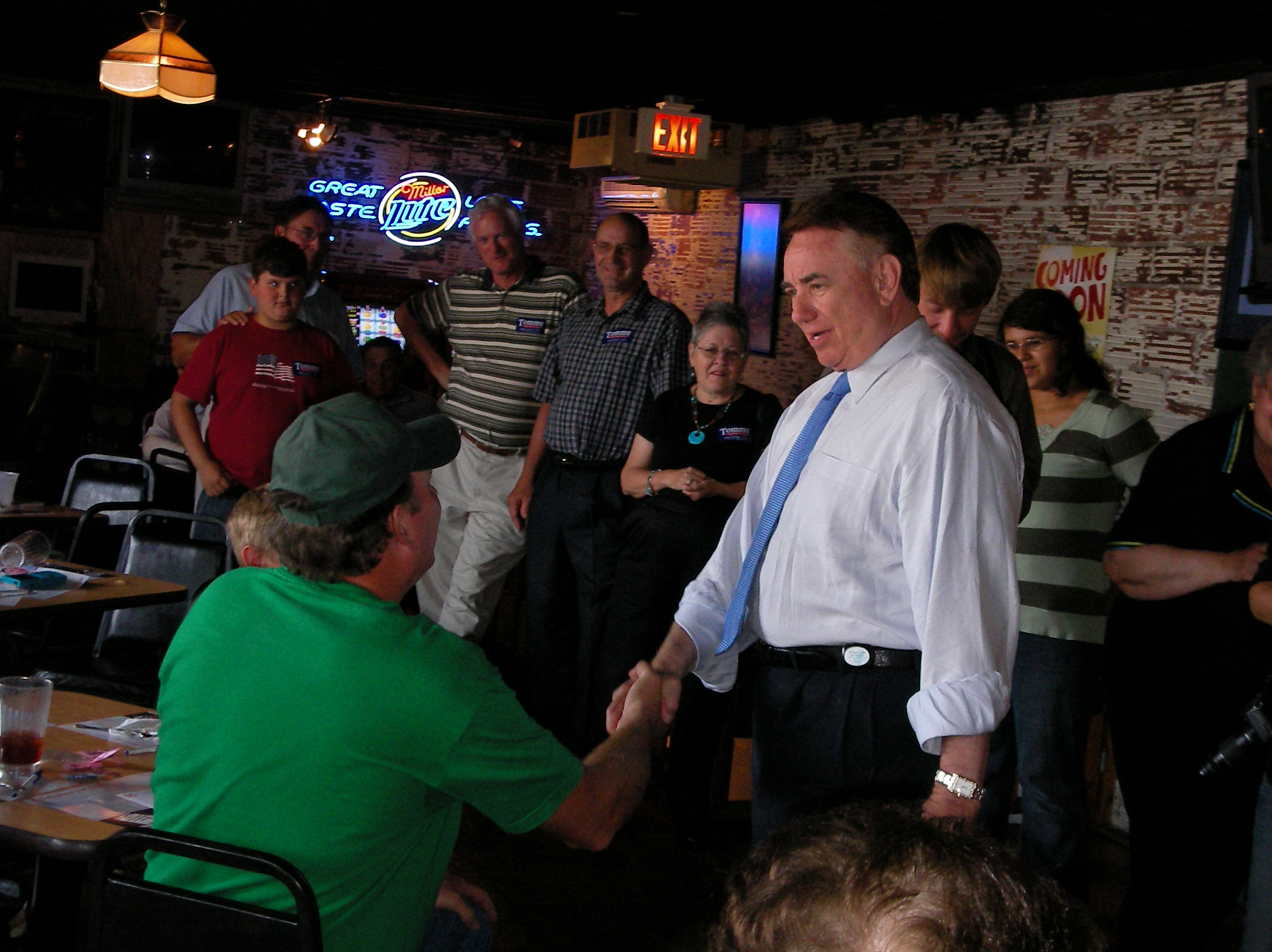
Thompson campaigns in Iowa in July 2007.

On July 15, new financial reports were released that revealed that Thompson had raised $445,000 during the second quarter of 2007 and had $115,000 cash on hand. This showed a slight increase from his first quarter figures, but was still far below his fellow Republican candidates. Among the candidates, he ranked second to last in fundraising, just ahead of Jim Gilmore, who dropped out of the race a day before the financial disclosure. Thompson stated earlier in the month that he was "pleased at the strong growth" in fundraising, and that he was still "able to run a campaign equal to that of the better-funded candidates despite the differences in funding." Additionally, Thompson remained low in nationwide polls, standing at three percent in a July 21 Washington Post-ABC News survey, which actually reflected a two-point increase in support from June.

Thompson addressed the monthly meeting of the San Diego Republican Party on July 16, before returning to Iowa on July 19 for the second leg of the "Common Sense Solutions Tour". He campaigned in the state for the next four days before taking a few days off. He returned to Iowa for the third and final leg of the tour on July 28 and remained there until the end of the month. David Wise of Wispolitics.com following Thompson during part of the final leg of the tour. He maintained a blog that described every event attended by Thompson and his interaction with voters. Wise also witnessed a spat between Thompson and fellow presidential candidate Tom Tancredo. Thompson criticized Tancredo for negative campaigning after discovering that he had sent out a mailer that referred to Thompson as a "moderate governor" that supported amnesty for illegal immigrants. He labelled the mailer a "hate piece" put out by "somebody who's way behind and is trying to attack me". At one event, as he countered Tancredo's claims, Tancredo himself entered the building, leading Thompson to point him out. He proceeded to list his accomplishments as governor and remarked "I have been against amnesty my whole career, contrary to what one of my opponents has said."

Around this time, Thompson accepted an invitation to CNN's YouTube debate despite assurances from Rudy Giuliani and Mitt Romney that they would not appear. Romney referenced the Democratic Party's YouTube debate, and commented that "the presidency ought to be held at a higher level than having to answer questions from a snowman." In response, Thompson's spokesman Steve Grubbs remarked: "We'll answer questions from any American who wants to ask one and that includes one dressed up like a snowman...Tommy Thompson is ready to take on all questions".

After spending nearly all of the month campaigning in Iowa, Thompson said at the end of July that if he failed to win or come in second at the state's straw poll, he would drop out of the race. He admitted that the campaign significantly lacked funding and that he was spending large amounts of his own money to stay afloat. He believed that a strong showing could improve his ability to raise funds, and planned to bus supporters to the straw poll and pay the $35 entrance fee for each.

In an interview with WisPolitics.com, Thompson commented that he had more experience than any other candidate in the race, and that only Democrat Bill Richardson came close. He believed that his experience, combined with his efforts in Iowa would make up for his lack of funds. Thompson proclaimed to Pajamas Media that he would be "shocked" if he did not win the straw poll, and in his own personal analysis of the race, commented: "I wouldn't say Romney's in trouble, but I'd say I think it's going to be between Romney and myself."

=== August 2007 ===
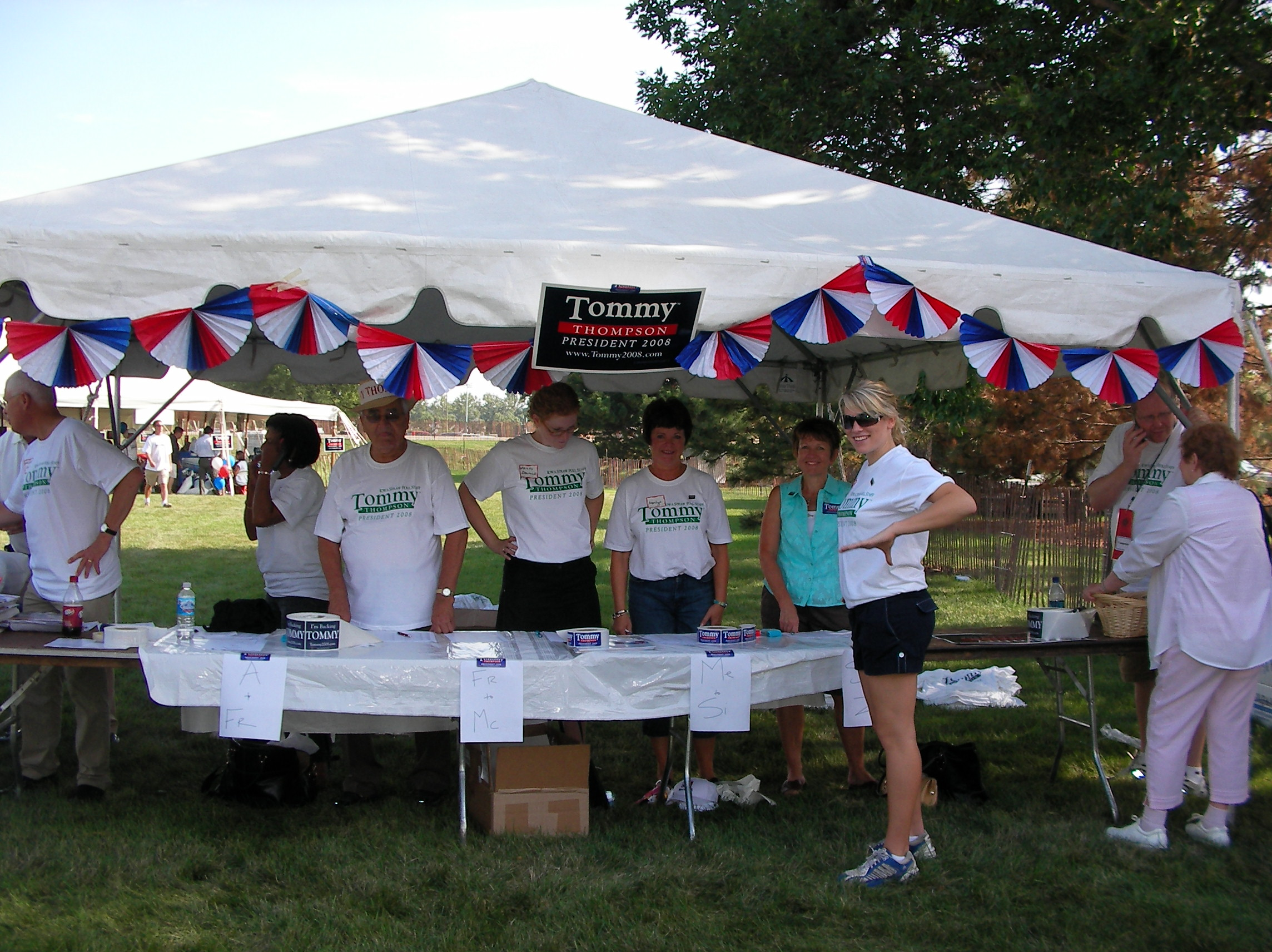
Tommy Thompson's campaign tent at the Ames Straw Poll

Thompson continued his strategy in Iowa heading into August, speaking on the trail about how "remarkably well" his campaign had been going. It was revealed that the campaign was running on an $890,000 budget and that no speechwriters or pollsters had been hired. In August, Thompson achieved his goal of having campaigned in all 99 Iowa counties.

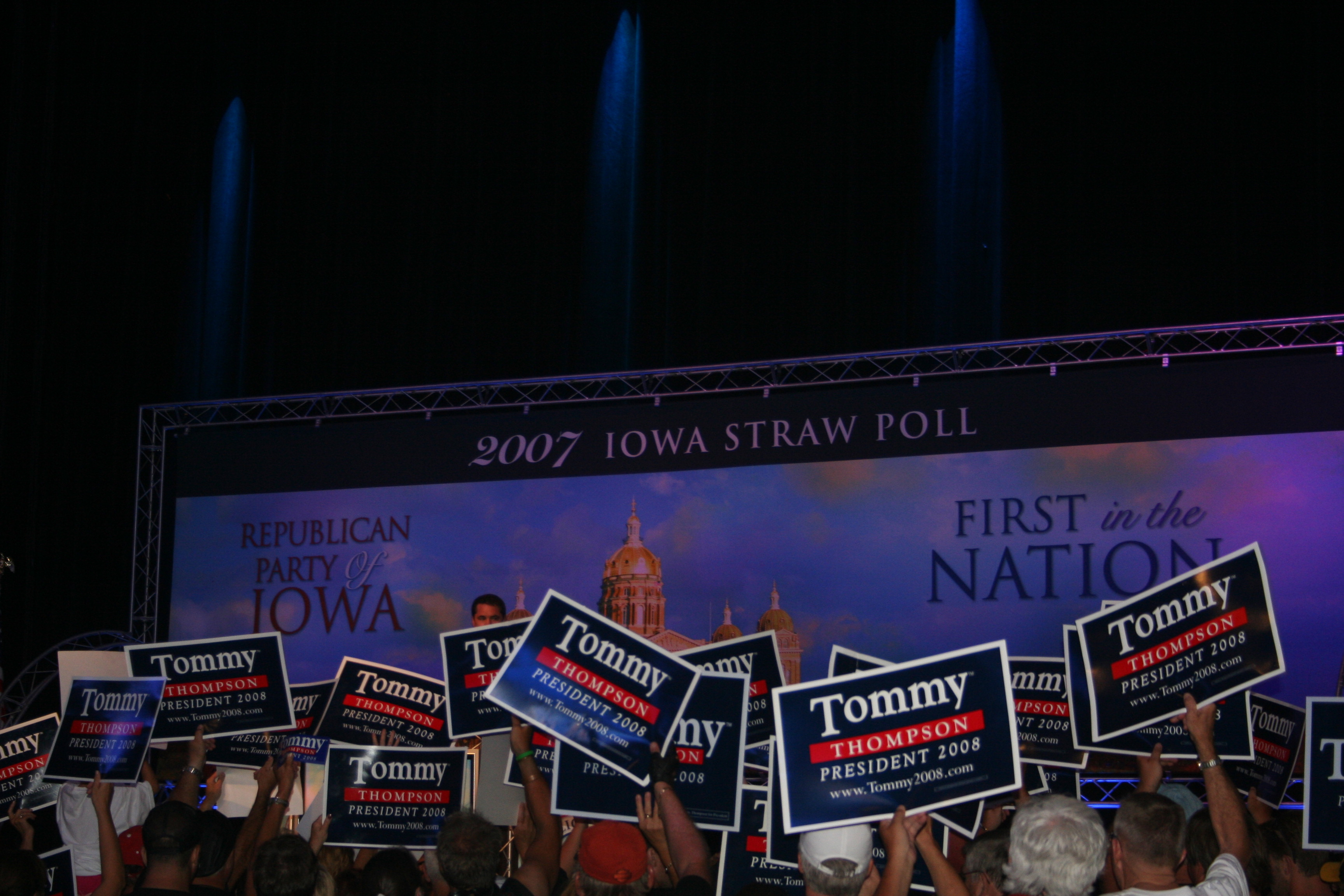
Thompson supporters display signs at the Ames Straw Poll

He competed in his final debate on August 5 in Des Moines. During the discourse, the candidate made the same points he had in previous debates, emphasizing health care, federalism, and popular sovereignty in Iraq. He described the war on terrorism as a "holy war" the United States was losing because of a lack of unity. At the end of the debate, Thompson made his last plea before the upcoming Ames straw poll, addressing his wish for Republicans, Democrats and Independents to unite to "start building America a stronger and healthier and better tomorrow than ever before."

=== Withdrawal ===
On August 11, 2007, Thompson finished in sixth place at the Ames straw poll with 1,039 votes or about seven percent of the total. Romney won the most votes, but his victory was overshadowed by the surprisingly strong showing of the second place Mike Huckabee. Huckabee considered skipping the straw poll, but decided to participate after a conversation with Thompson earlier in the summer. After the event, Thompson dropped out of the race. Campaign spokesman Brian Dumas commented that he had "worked very hard...[and] did everything we asked of him and more." The next day, Thompson released a statement on his withdrawal:

I felt my record as Governor of Wisconsin and Secretary of Health and Human Services gave me the experience I needed to serve as president, but I respect the decision of the voters. I am leaving the campaign trail today, but I will not leave the challenges of improving health care and welfare in America.

== Endorsements ==
The following people endorsed Tommy Thompson's 2008 presidential campaign:

- Pfizer lobbyist Kristine Coryell
- Bulk Petroleum Owner Darshan Dhaliwal
- Attorney Gerald Doyle
- Richland, Iowa Mayor Tom Hoekstra
- New Orleans Saints running back Aaron Stecker
- Former DHS Chief of Staff A. Scott Whitaker

== List of campaign events ==
2007 events

Date	Location(s)	Event(s)
4-4	Cedar Rapids, IA; Milwaukee, WI; Manchester, NH	Speeches, House Party
4–5	Manchester, NH	Speech, Meeting
4–14	Des Moines, IA; Fort Dodge, IA; Winterset, IA; Indianola, IA	Fundraiser, Speeches
4–18	Bettendorf, IA	Speech
4–19	Iowa City, IA	Appearance
4-25	Bankston, IA	Town Hall
4-26	Elkader, IA	Appearance
5–3	Simi Valley, CA	Debate
5–4	Clive, IA; Grundy Center, IA; Clarksville, IA	Appearance, Town Hall, Fundraiser
5-5	Waukon, IA; Cresco, IA; Forest City, IA; Mason City, IA; Charles City, IA	Town Halls, Appearances
5–8	Bedford, NH; Manchester, NH	Meeting, Speech
5–9	West Des Moines, IA; Anamosa, IA; Decorah, IA	Town Hall, Meetings
5–10	Le Mars, IA; Sioux City, IA	Meetings
5–15	Columbia, SC	Debate
5–16	Seabrook Beach, NH; Concord, NH	Meeting, Party Event
6–2	Alta, IA; Spencer, IA	Appearance, Town Hall
6–4	Manchester, NH	Meeting
6–5	Manchester, NH	Debate
6-6	Manchester, NH; Concord, NH; Portsmouth, NH	Speeches
6–8	Clinton, IA; Davenport, IA	Appearance, Fundraiser
6–10	Charles City, IA	Party Event
6–15	Davenport, IA; Clinton, IA	Appearances
6–19	Urbandale, IA; Des Moines, IA	House Party, Speech
6-23	Richland, IA; Cedar Rapids, IA	Appearance, Fundraiser
6-25	Hanover, NH	Fundraiser
6-26	Fort Madison, IA; Wapello, IA; Muscatine, IA	Meetings
6-27	Iowa City, IA	Appearance
6-28	Council Bluffs, IA; Des Moines, IA; Marshalltown, IA	Town Hall, Forum, Appearance
6-30	Council Bluffs, IA; Des Moines, IA; Marshalltown, IA	Town Hall, Forum, Meeting
7-7	Webster City, IA; Fort Dodge, IA; Pocahontas, IA; Rockwell City, IA; Carroll, IA; Jefferson, IA	Appearances
7–8	Boone, IA; Iowa Falls, IA	Appearances
7–9	Adel, IA; Winterset, IA; Pella, IA; Sully, IA	Town Halls, Appearances
7–10	Grinnell, IA; Marengo, IA; Mount Vernon, IA; Shellsburg, IA; Gladbrook, IA; Marshalltown, IA	Town Halls, Appearances, House Party
7–11	Allison, IA; Hampton, IA; Mason City, IA; New Hampton, IA; Waterloo, IA; Grundy Center, IA	Appearances, Town Hall, Party Event
7–12	Oelwein, IA; Independence, IA; Dubuque, IA; Maquoketa, IA; Davenport, IA	Appearances
7–13	Corydon, IA; Burlington, IA; Mt. Pleasant, IA; Centerville, IA	Appearances
7–14	Creston, IA; Council Bluffs, IA; Atlantic, IA; Chariton, IA	Appearances
7–16	San Diego, CA	Speech
7–19	Le Mars, IA	Meeting
7-20	Ida Grove, IA; Early, IA; Cherokee, IA; Spencer, IA; Okoboji, IA; Estherville, IA	Meetings, Town Hall
7-21	Emmetsburg, IA; Algona, IA; Garner, IA; Northwood, IA; Saint Ansgar, IA; Clear Lake, IA	House Party, Town Hall, Meetings
7-22	Strawberry Point, IA; Decorah, IA; Waukon, IA	Meetings
7-28	Washington, IA; Oskaloosa, IA; Albia, IA; Ottumwa, IA; Bloomfield, IA; Denmark, IA	Fundraiser, Party Event, Meetings
7-29	Iowa City, IA; Cedar Rapids, IA; Wilton, IA	House Party, Meetings
7-30	Corning, IA; Bedford, IA; Clarinda, IA; Sidney, IA; Red Oak, IA	Meetings
7-31	Onawa, IA; Missouri Valley, IA; Harlan, IA; Audubon, IA; Des Moines, IA	House Party, Meetings
8–2	Bettendorf, IA	Meeting
8–4	Des Moines, IA	Meeting
8–5	Des Moines, IA	Debate
8–9	Ames, IA; Des Moines, IA	Meeting, Forum
8–10	Ames, IA; Marshalltown, IA; Des Moines, IA	Rally, Fundraiser, Speeches, Forum
8–11	Ames, IA; Des Moines, IA; Ankeny, IA	Party Event, Forum, Speeches, Appearances

== Aftermath ==
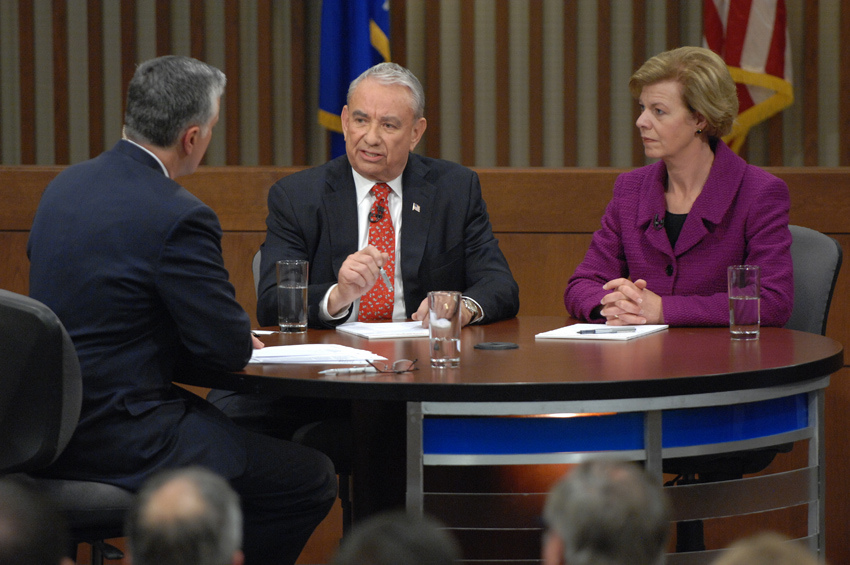
Thompson debates Baldwin in 2012

Two months after his withdrawal, Thompson endorsed Rudy Giuliani for president. He praised the former New York City mayor as someone who "can and will win the nomination and the presidency" and argued that "during a period of time of great stress for this country he showed tremendous leadership" as "America's mayor". After Giuliani's withdrawal in 2008, Thompson backed John McCain, who ultimately won the Republican Party's nomination. During the general election, Thompson told The New York Times that he was not satisfied with McCain's campaign and that "I don’t know who is." McCain lost the election to Democratic Senator Barack Obama.

In 2011, Thompson entered the 2012 race for the U.S. Senate seat vacated by retiring Democratic Senator Herb Kohl of Wisconsin. Thompson won the GOP nomination but lost to Representative Tammy Baldwin in the general election.

== Bibliography ==
- John F. Kennedy School of Government. Institute of Politics (July 28, 2009). Campaign for president: the managers look at 2008. Rowman & Littlefield. ISBN 978-0-7425-7047-4.
- Huckabee, Mike (November 18, 2008). Do the right thing: inside the movement that's bringing common sense back to America. Penguin. ISBN 978-1-59523-054-6.
