= Keith Kerr =

American military officer and gay rights activist

Keith H. Kerr
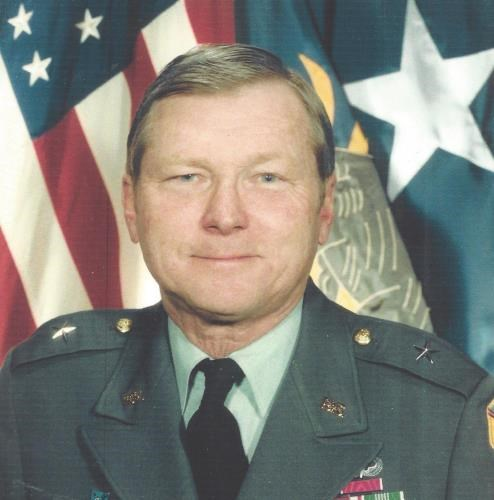
- Born: 1931; Kentfield, California, U.S.
- Died: October 24, 2021 (aged 90); Cupertino, California, U.S.
- Military career
- Allegiance: United States of America
- Branch: United States Army, California State Military Reserve (CSMR)
- Rank: Brigadier general (CSMR)
- Commands: Northern Area Command (CSMR)
- Awards: Legion of Merit, the Meritorious Service Medal, the Army Commendation Medal, the Army Reserve Medal, the California Medal of Merit, and the California Commendation Medal.
- Other work: City College of San Francisco Dean, Hillary Clinton Presidential Campaign Advisor

Keith H. Kerr (1931 – October 24, 2021) was a United States Army Reserve Colonel, who later was given the rank of brigadier general in the California State Military Reserve, part of the California State Defense Forces, and in 2003 became one of the highest-ranking openly gay military officers.

== Service record ==
Kerr enlisted as a private at Fort Ord on September 21, 1953, and served in the 513th Military Intelligence Group in Germany after the Korean War. After leaving Active Army service, Kerr served in the U. S. Army Reserve and was commissioned a first lieutenant in June 1960. Kerr retired from the U. S. Army Reserve in 1986 as a colonel.

Kerr was commissioned in the California State Military Reserve, a state defense force, and was given the rank of brigadier general on February 21, 1991. The brigadier general rank in a state organization is not recognized by the federal government where his U.S. Army rank for retirement purposes remains a colonel.

During his tenure with the California State Military Reserve, Kerr was the inspector general, chief of staff, commanding general of the Northern Area Command at the Alameda Naval Supply Depot in Alameda, California.

== Civilian record ==
He is a graduate of the University of California, Berkeley and has a master's degree from San Francisco State University.

As a member of the faculty at City College of San Francisco, Kerr was chair of the Business Department, dean of instruction, and dean of instructional support and special assistant to the president before retiring in 1995. After that time, he continued teaching as an adjunct professor.

He resided in Santa Rosa, California, then Cupertino, California. Kerr died on October 24, 2021, at the age of 90.

== Gay activist ==
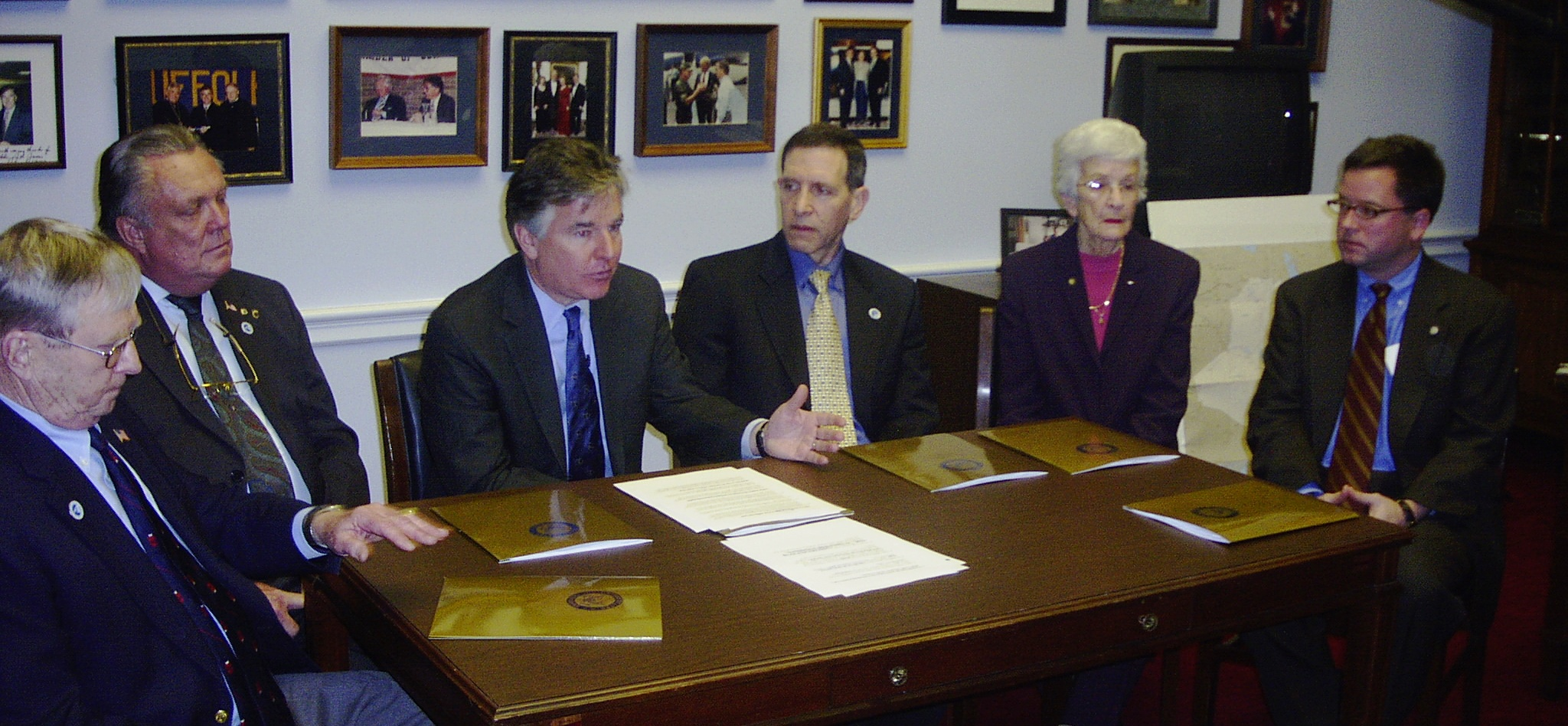
Kerr (left) during a 2005 announcement by Congressman Marty Meehan of introduction of ultimately unsuccessful legislation to repeal the Don't Ask Don't Tell Policy

On December 10, 2003, Kerr revealed in an interview with The New York Times that he is gay.

The interview was critical of the Don't ask, don't tell policy. Also coming out in the interview were Brigadier General Virgil A. Richard of the army and Rear Admiral Alan M. Steinman of the United States Coast Guard. At the time they were the highest-ranking members of the military to acknowledge being gay. In the interview he said, "The culture of the military is that you go along and conform ... And you keep your private life to yourself."

He became a member of the Servicemembers’ Legal Defense Network. Kerr was a supporter of John Kerry in his 2004 Presidential run and was listed on a Hillary Clinton press release as a member of the steering committee of the "LGBT Americans For Hillary."

=== CNN-YouTube Debate controversy ===
On November 28, 2007, Kerr submitted a YouTube video that was used as a question in the Republican Presidential Debate in St. Petersburg, Florida on CNN. Kerr was also present in the audience and was asked to speak in which he said:

My name is Keith Kerr, from Santa Rosa, California. I'm retired brigadier general with 43 years of service, and I'm a graduate of the Special Forces Officer Course, the Command and General Staff Course, and the Army War College. And I'm an openly gay man. I want to know why you think that American men and women in uniform are not professional enough to serve with gays and lesbians.

After the candidates responded Anderson Cooper asked him if he got an answer to his question to which he replied, "With all due respect, I did not get an answer from the candidates."

Kerr's question generated criticism of CNN for not disclosing Kerr's Clinton ties. CNN had paid Kerr's traveling expenses to the debate but stated that it was unaware of the connection with the Clinton campaign at the time. When asked if anyone affiliated with the Clinton campaign "put you up to the idea of asking this question," Mr. Kerr stated that "[t]his was a private initiative of my own." CNN pulled Kerr's question and response in subsequent replays.
