= 2008 Republican Party presidential debates and forums =

The first political debate before the 2008 Republican primaries was held on May 3, 2007, at the Ronald Reagan Presidential Library in California. Other debates have taken place in New Hampshire, South Carolina, and Florida. They were generally broadcast by television networks.

The debates can have a substantial effect on the primaries and are important chances for the public to compare the candidates side-by-side.

== Candidates in the debates ==
- Senator John McCain – Arizona (won nomination).
- Representative Ron Paul – Texas (withdrew June 12, 2008).
- Former UN Ambassador Alan Keyes – Maryland (withdrew from Republican Party April 15, 2008).
- Former Governor Mike Huckabee – Arkansas (withdrew March 4, 2008).
- Former Governor Mitt Romney – Massachusetts (withdrew February 7, 2008).
- Former Mayor Rudy Giuliani – New York (withdrew January 30, 2008).
- Former Senator Fred Thompson – Tennessee (withdrew January 22, 2008).
- Representative Duncan Hunter – California (withdrew January 19, 2008).
- Representative Tom Tancredo – Colorado (withdrew December 19, 2007).
- Senator Sam Brownback – Kansas (withdrew October 19, 2007).
- Former Governor Tommy Thompson – Wisconsin (withdrew August 12, 2007).
- Former Governor Jim Gilmore – Virginia (withdrew July 14, 2007).

== Attendance ==
Key: P denotes candidate participated in debate; N denotes candidate was not invited; A denotes candidate absent but was invited; O denotes candidate was out of the race.

Details			Candidates Participating											
Date	Place	Sponsor	Sen. Brownback	Fmr. Gov. Gilmore	Fmr. Mayor Giuliani	Fmr. Gov. Huckabee	Rep. Hunter	Sen. McCain	Fmr. Amb. Keyes	Rep. Paul	Fmr. Gov. Romney	Rep. Tancredo	Fmr. Sen. F. Thompson	Fmr. Gov. T. Thompson
May 3, 2007	Simi Valley, California	MSNBC	P	P	P	P	P	P	O	P	P	P	O	P
May 15, 2007	Columbia, South Carolina	Fox News Channel	P	P	P	P	P	P	O	P	P	P	O	P
June 5, 2007	Goffstown, New Hampshire	CNN	P	P	P	P	P	P	O	P	P	P	O	P
July 12, 2007	Detroit, Michigan	None	A	A	A	A	A	A	O	A	A	P	O	A
August 5, 2007	Des Moines, Iowa	ABC	P	O	P	P	P	P	O	P	P	P	O	P
September 5, 2007	Durham, New Hampshire	Fox News Channel	P	O	P	P	P	P	O	P	P	P	O	O
September 17, 2007	Fort Lauderdale, Florida	Sky Angel	P	O	A	P	P	A	P	P	A	P	A	O
September 27, 2007	Baltimore, Maryland	PBS	P	O	A	P	P	A	P	P	A	P	A	O
October 9, 2007	Dearborn, Michigan	CNBC, MSNBC	P	O	P	P	P	P	N	P	P	P	P	O
October 16, 2007	Washington, D.C.	None	P	O	P	A	N	P	N	N	P	N	P	O
October 21, 2007	Orlando, Florida	Fox News Channel	O	O	P	P	P	P	N	P	P	P	P	O
October 25, 2007	Sioux City, Iowa	IPTV	O	O	A	P	A	P	N	A	A	A	A	O
November 28, 2007	St. Petersburg, Florida	CNN	O	O	P	P	P	P	N	P	P	P	P	O
December 9, 2007	Miami, Florida	Univision	O	O	P	P	P	P	N	P	P	A	P	O
December 12, 2007	Johnston, Iowa	CNN, Fox News Channel, IPTV, MSNBC	O	O	P	P	P	P	P	P	P	P	P	O
January 5, 2008	Goffstown, New Hampshire	ABC	O	O	P	P	N	P	N	P	P	O	P	O
January 6, 2008	Milford, New Hampshire	Fox News Channel	O	O	P	P	N	P	N	N	P	O	P	O
January 10, 2008	Myrtle Beach, South Carolina	Fox News Channel	O	O	P	P	N	P	N	P	P	O	P	O
January 24, 2008	Boca Raton, Florida	MSNBC	O	O	P	P	O	P	N	P	P	O	O	O
January 30, 2008	Simi Valley, California	CNN	O	O	O	P	O	P	N	P	P	O	O	O
February 2, 2008	New York, New York	MTV	O	O	O	P	O	A	N	P	A	O	O	O

Key: P denotes candidate participated in debate; N denotes candidate was not invited; A denotes candidate absent but was invited; O denotes candidate was out of the race.

== The candidate debates ==
=== May 3, 2007 - Simi Valley, California ===
The first Republican debate was at the Ronald Reagan Presidential Library in Simi Valley, California. It was simulcast live for 90 minutes on MSNBC and Politico.com. Questions were gathered from Politico readers for the candidates. All declared candidates were present, as Fred Thompson had not yet declared. Former First Lady Nancy Reagan was present, along with California Governor Arnold Schwarzenegger.

The debate was moderated by MSNBC anchor Chris Matthews of Hardball and Politico's John Harris. Questions were gathered from Politico readers for the candidates.

The candidates presented differing opinions of President George W. Bush, with McCain and Huckabee criticizing Bush's mismanagement of the Iraq War while Giuliani and Romney praised Bush, Ron Paul said Bush was a poor conservative. The candidates also presented different opinions on contentious issues such as abortion and stem-cell research but were united in calling for further tax cuts. All candidates opposed a pullout from Iraq except for Ron Paul, who spoke and voted against the resolution to authorize war on Iraq in 2002 and has been a vocal critic of the war.

John McCain answered "yes" when asked whether he believed in evolution. Immediately following, the questioner inquired whether any of the candidates did not believe in evolution, three candidates (Tancredo, Brownback, and Huckabee) raised their hands. McCain then added "I believe in evolution, but I also believe, when I hike the Grand Canyon and see a sunset, that the hand of God is there also." Later in the June 5 debate, Brownback and Huckabee elaborated on their position, taking a far more moderate approach.

Pundits Howard Fineman and Joe Scarborough concluded that Romney did the best and maintained his posture by seeming the most energetic in the debate. Eugene Robinson deduced that Romney showed that he has the potential to be a formidable candidate and also answered the most questions in a consistent manner.

At the end of the debate, MSNBC's online votes showed Ron Paul standing out from the other candidates. Ron Paul won "Best one liner," "Who stood out from the pack" "Most convincing debater", and "Who showed the most leadership qualities?" In all four, he had at least 45% of the total vote.

Mitt Romney won an online vote taken at The Drudge Report, with Giuliani and Paul close behind.

- CFR Transcript
- MSNBC Transcript
- New York Times Transcript
- Video with Closed Caption

=== May 15, 2007 - Columbia, South Carolina ===
The second Republican debate was held on May 15 in Columbia, South Carolina at the Koger Center for the Arts at the University of South Carolina. All declared candidates participated. It was broadcast live for 90 minutes on Fox News Channel, and simulcast on Fox News Radio affiliates, including the station of the debate, WVOC. The event was moderated by Brit Hume, with Chris Wallace and Wendell Goler asking most of the questions. The debate was in three rounds, the first on the War in Iraq, the second on domestic issues, such as abortion, gay rights, spending and tax cuts. For the last, Brit Hume proposed a fictional scenario involving terrorism. The candidates had to predict their actions in that situation. Fox News held text message voting by the audience. Ron Paul received the most (33%) with Mike Huckabee second (18%).

During the debate, Ron Paul asserted that American interventionism in the Middle East, from CIA installation of Iranian leaders to the bombing of Iraq in the 1990s, culminating in the ongoing Iraq war, led to anti-American sentiment in the Middle East and to terrorists plotting attacks against America. Rudy Giuliani portrayed Paul as implying that America had justified the 9/11 attacks through its actions and interrupted the proceedings to demand a retraction, which Paul refused. Former head of the CIA's bin Laden unit, Michael Scheuer, congratulated Ron Paul for his comments, calling them "the truth." Others portrayed the exchange as a victory for Giuliani.

The fictional ticking time bomb scenario suggested by the moderator was: "Three shopping centers near major U.S. cities have been hit by suicide bombers. Hundreds are dead, thousands injured. A fourth attack has been averted when the attackers were captured off the Florida coast and taken to Guantanamo Bay, where they are being questioned. U.S. intelligence believes that another larger attack is planned and could come at any time." John McCain and Ron Paul were the only candidates who said they were opposed to the concept of "enhanced interrogation techniques", a phrase Paul labeled Orwellian newspeak for torture. Mitt Romney suggested that the U.S. double the size of facilities holding non-citizen enemy combatants held in places like Guantanamo and deny them access to the protections afforded to American citizens, such as the right of having an attorney. Giuliani said interrogators should use "any method they can think of" and did not exclude water-boarding. Expressing disbelief at the idea of debating "whether or not waterboarding would be a bad thing to do" Tom Tancredo said "I'm looking for Jack Bauer."

Mike Huckabee drew the biggest laughter of the night when he accused Congress of spending money "like John Edwards at a beauty shop," a reference to Edwards, who at that time was a 2008 Democratic presidential candidate, spending $800 of campaign money on two haircuts.

- CFR Transcript
- New York Times Transcript
- Entire Debate Video
- Video with Closed Caption

=== June 5, 2007 - Goffstown, New Hampshire ===
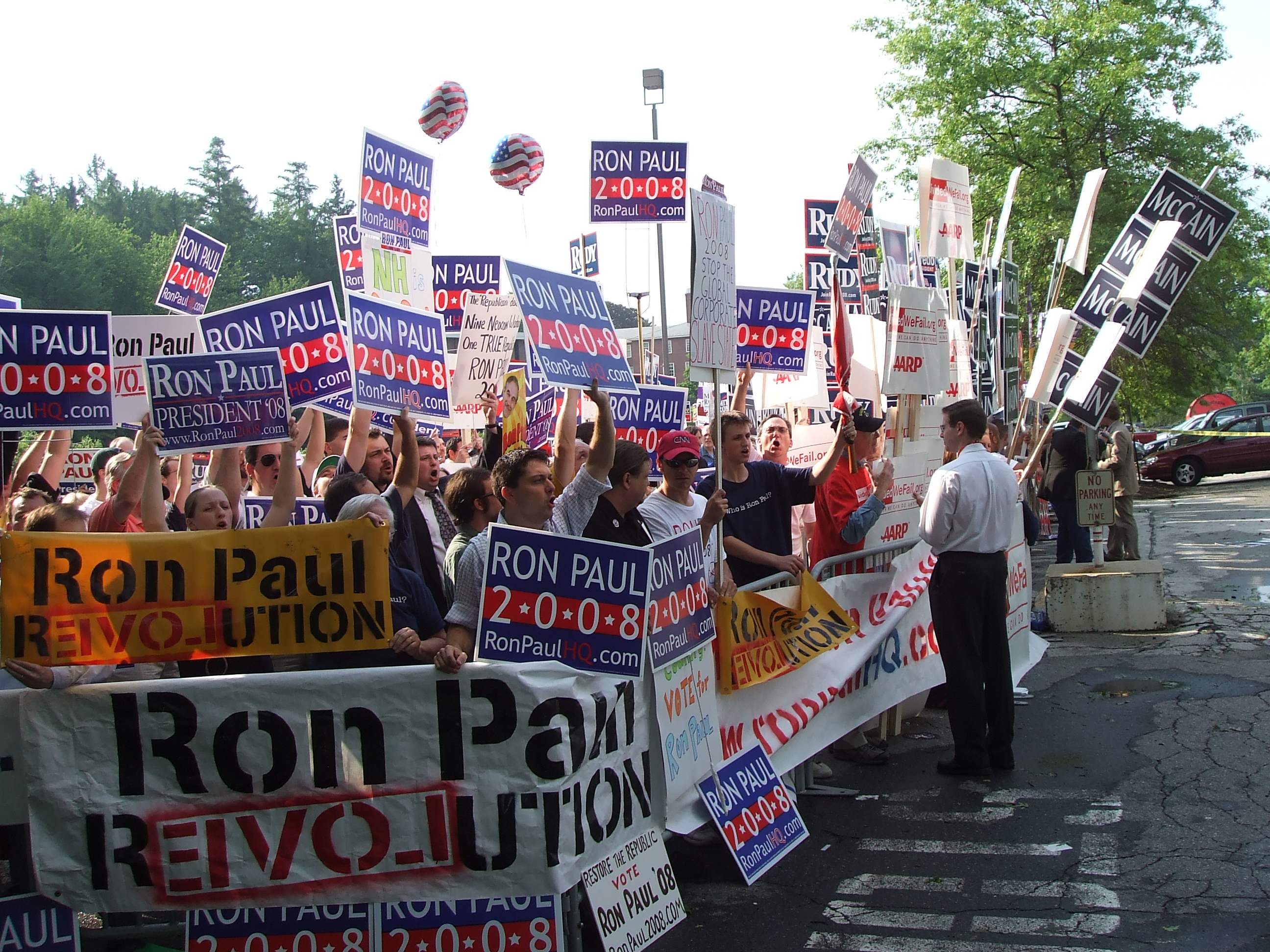
Ron Paul supporters outside of the debate location

WMUR-TV, CNN, and the New Hampshire Union Leader hosted Democratic and Republican debates at Saint Anselm College in Goffstown, New Hampshire, part of the Manchester urban area. The debate was two hours, without commercials, making it and the CNN Democratic debate the longest debates in the 2008 season so far. All declared candidates participated, which excluded Fred Thompson. Wolf Blitzer of The Situation Room and Late Edition on CNN moderated the debate.

According to the online CNN.com poll, Ron Paul received the most votes in all but two categories: "snappiest dresser," who was Mitt Romney, and "most disappointing performance" who was Rudy Giuliani. The "big three" candidates (Giuliani, McCain, Romney) also received larger shares of air time compared to the "minor candidates."

A WBZ-Franklin Pierce College poll showed Romney as the winner of the debate at 22%, followed by Rudy Giuliani at 18% and John McCain at 11%. In that poll, none of the other candidates earnered over 3%. Participants in the debate: Sam Brownback, James S. Gilmore, Rudy Giuliani, Duncan Hunter, Mike Huckabee, John McCain, Ron Paul, Mitt Romney, Tom Tancredo and Tommy Thompson

- CFR Transcript
- CNN Transcript
- CNN Video
- Video with Closed Caption
- New York Times Transcript
- Entire Debate Video

=== July 12, 2007 - Detroit, Michigan ===
Attended only by Tom Tancredo. All 10 Republican candidates were invited, only Tancredo attended.

This was held during the NAACP 98th annual convention. It was hosted by Russ Mitchell.

- Webcast from NAACP web site (click on Republican Candidates forum)

=== August 5, 2007 - Des Moines, Iowa ===
ABC News conducted a live, 90-minute debate that aired Sunday morning on a special edition of This Week, moderated by George Stephanopoulos at Drake University. All Republican candidates were present. Mitt Romney defended his change of position on abortion from support of reproductive rights to opposition of legal abortion care. Ron Paul spoke of pulling U.S. troops out of Iraq. The debate concluded with the candidates' revealing their biggest mistakes. Frontrunners Mitt Romney, Rudy Giuliani, and John McCain were given more time to speak than were lesser-known candidates, as in previous debates.

According to an on-line poll at ABCNews.com, Paul won the debate with 63% of votes. Paul's vote total was nearly eight times as many as runner-up Romney. Frank Luntz, a political commentator for Fox News, asserted that Mike Huckabee had won the debate.

- CFR Transcript
- New York Times Transcript
- Entire Debate Video
- Video with Closed Caption

=== September 5, 2007 - Durham, New Hampshire ===
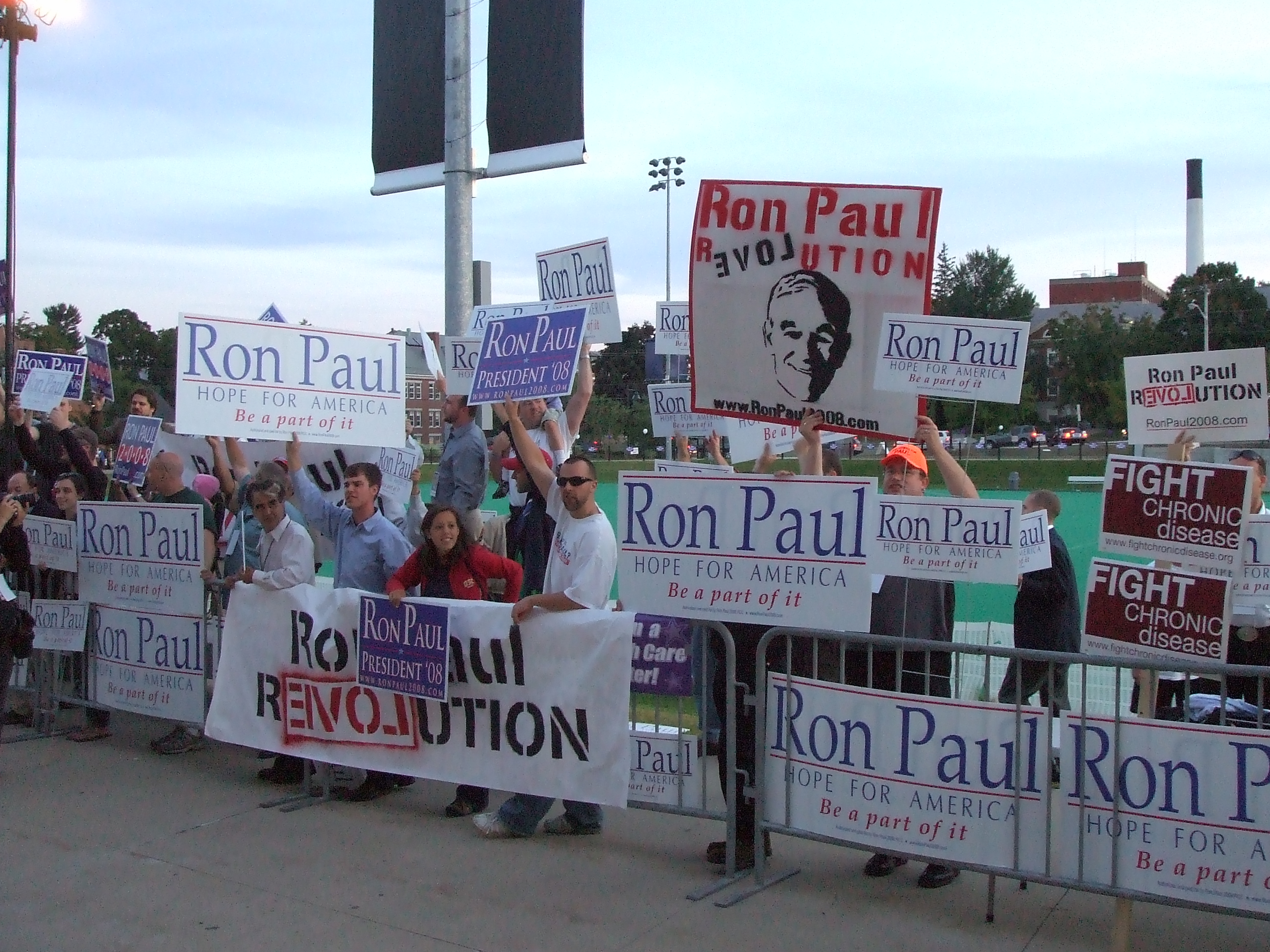
Ron Paul supporters outside of the debate venue

Fox News Channel hosted a Republican debate at The Whittemore Center at the University of New Hampshire in Durham, New Hampshire, for 90 minutes on Fox News. The event was moderated by Brit Hume, with Chris Wallace and Wendell Goler asking most of the questions. According to a public text messaging poll, Ron Paul won with 33%, Mike Huckabee came in second with 18%, followed by Rudy Giuliani and John McCain who received 15% and 14% respectively. All candidates who were declared participated.

The Fox News Luntz focus groups watching the debate declared disappointment with the performance by Mitt Romney and Rudy Giuliani, though John McCain was viewed favorably. However, some noted the lack of McCain supporters in the audience. The status of Larry Craig was discussed in the debate, with Sam Brownback stating that Craig should go through with his decision to resign.

An exchange between Ron Paul and Mike Huckabee over the war in Iraq was covered extensively by many news agencies.

- CFR Transcript
- Entire Debate Video
- Video with Closed Caption

=== September 17, 2007 - Fort Lauderdale, Florida ===
The first-ever "Values Voter" Presidential Debate was held for the GOP candidates at the Broward Center for the Performing Arts in Fort Lauderdale, Florida. It was broadcast live on television on Sky Angel, and live on many Christian radio stations, including the Voice of Christian Youth America (VCY America) network and WKBF-AM, and online on the American Family Association (AFA) Web site. Seven candidates attended-- Brownback, Huckabee, Hunter, Paul, Tancredo, and newly announced candidate Alan Keyes and John H. Cox, a candidate who had then not appeared in any of the other debates. The official Web site reports the immediate straw poll of 340 delegates was won by Huckabee with 219 votes (63%) to Paul 44 (13%), Keyes 22 (7%), Brownback 18 (5%), Fred Thompson 15 (4%), Hunter 4%, Tancredo 2%, Giuliani 1%, McCain 1%, Cox 1%, and Romney 0%. A similar event was planned for the Democratic candidates, but none would confirm their participation.

- Full transcript

=== September 27, 2007 - Baltimore, Maryland ===
PBS television hosted a Republican debate in Baltimore, Maryland, at Morgan State University that aired live on PBS and on www.pbs.org. Dubbed the "All-American Presidential Forums," it was the first prime time debate with a panel exclusively of journalists of color. Questions were asked by host Tavis Smiley and panelists Ray Suarez of The NewsHour, Cynthia Tucker of The Atlanta Journal-Constitution, and NPR's Juan Williams.

The six debaters were Sam Brownback, Mike Huckabee, Alan Keyes, Ron Paul, Duncan Hunter, and Tom Tancredo. Absent were Rudy Giuliani, John McCain, Mitt Romney, and Fred Thompson, who, according to public opinion surveys, were the leading Republican candidates. The organizers put empty podiums on the stage in place of the candidates who refused to attend.

Most of the questions focused on racial issues.

For the most part, the candidates agreed with one another about most of the issues discussed. One exception came near the end when Cynthia Tucker asked, "Does the U.S. have a role to play in ending the genocide in Darfur?" All the candidates except Paul answered in the affirmative, though most ruled out using U.S. troops. Huckabee added that we also need to address "the infanticide in our own country, with the slaughter of millions of unborn children." Paul opposed even sending food, and added, "we should direct our attention only to national security, and not get involved for these feel-good reasons of going overseas for the various reasons, and this is the main reason why I think we ought to just come home from every place in the coun-, from every place in the world." Keyes replied, "I have to say I'm appalled by the suggestion that we retreat into some kind of Fortress America, and forget who we are. We are a nation of nations, a people of many peoples. We are in touch with every people on the face of the earth. If somebody's is being hurt somewhere in the world, somebody in America grieves for them. And I don't believe we can turn our backs on that universal significance, that universal mission... We don't have to send troops, but we need to support and reinforce the sense of local regional responsibility for both humanitarian and military order in that region."

- Video with Closed Caption
- Transcript
- PBS Transcript
- PBS Video, Audio and downloadable Podcast

=== October 9, 2007 - Dearborn, Michigan ===
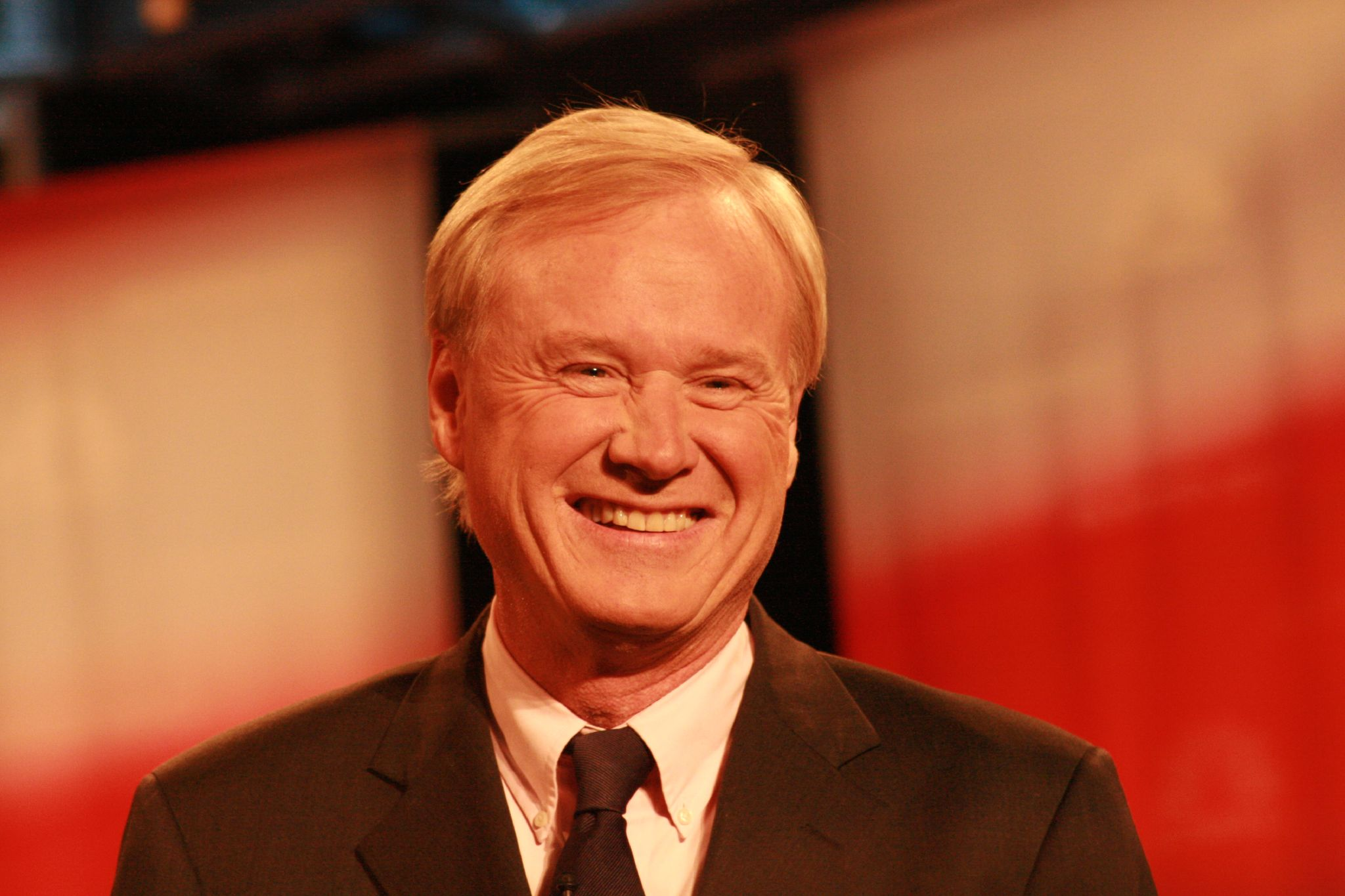
Co-moderator Chris Mathews at the October 9 debate

CNBC, The Wall Street Journal, and the University of Michigan–Dearborn hosted a Republican debate in Dearborn, Michigan at the Ford Community and Performing Arts Center. It was co-moderated by MSNBC's Chris Matthews and CNBC's Maria Bartiromo. The focus of the debate was on the American economy.

Sam Brownback, Rudy Giuliani, Mike Huckabee, Duncan Hunter, John McCain, Ron Paul, Mitt Romney, Tom Tancredo, participated, along with Fred Thompson in his debate debut. Alan Keyes was not invited.

After the debate, Ron Paul won with over 7000 votes, because of which CNBC took take down the page.

One highlight of the debate occurred when Mitt Romney and Rudy Giuliani debated whether the line-item veto was constitutional or not. Giuliani claimed that it was unconstitutional and challenged former President Bill Clinton on its use, while Romney praised the practice citing that he used it 844 times as Governor of Massachusetts.

Another highlight in the debate happened when candidates were asked by Chris Matthews if they need to go to Congress to get authorization to take military action against Iran's nuclear facilities, if they were president of the United States. While Hunter, Huckabee, McCain, Thompson and Giuliani replied they would not obtain Congressional authorization if there was an imminent threat from Iran. Romney replied, "You sit down with your attorneys and (they) tell you what you have to do..." Paul advocated obtaining Congressional authorization, which he claimed is mandated by the US Constitution.

In the end of the debate, Mitt Romney remarked, "This is a lot like 'Law & Order,' senator. It has a huge cast, the series seems to go on forever and Fred Thompson shows up at the end." Romney was making a reference to Fred Thompson's role on Law & Order. Thompson replied, "And to think I thought I was going to be the best actor on the stage."

Critics of the debate have commented on the uneven amount of time given to "second tier" candidates.

The debate aired on CNBC and MSNBC.

- CFR Transcript
- MSNBC Video
- Video with Closed Caption

=== October 16, 2007 - Washington, D.C. ===
The Republican Jewish Coalition debate at the Grand Hyatt Hotel Independence Ballroom featured five candidates: Sam Brownback, Rudy Giuliani, John McCain, Mitt Romney, and Fred Thompson. Although Mike Huckabee was invited, he did not attend, due to being in California at an event with Newt Gingrich. RJC Communications Director Shari Hillman wrote that "due to the limited time available for the event, the RJC could only include the top six candidates currently in the field." The Jewish Telegraphic Agency reported that sources close to the RJC leadership said that Paul was excluded due to his "record of consistently voting against assistance to Israel and his criticisms of the pro-Israel lobby".

- RJC Forum Webcast

=== October 21, 2007 - Orlando, Florida ===
The Republican Party of Florida hosted a two-day event on October 20 and 21 featuring Republican candidates in a debate. Produced with the Fox News Channel, it was moderated by Chris Wallace, Brit Hume, Wendell Goler, and Carl Cameron. Eight candidates participated. Alan Keyes was not invited.

The event was at the Rosen Shingle Creek Hotel and Resort in Orlando, Florida. The weekend culminated in the nationally televised, prime-time debate.

According to Fox News Viewers "text voting" after the debate, Ron Paul won with 34%, Huckabee came in second with 27%, Giuliani third with 11%, Romney 10%, Thompson 9%, McCain 5%, Hunter 1% and Tancredo less than 1%.

At one point, with the poll showing Ron Paul winning the informal "cell phone" poll, Fox News talk show host Sean Hannity declared, "Ron Paul did not win the debate tonight." Hannity described the results as "stacking."

Paul was the only candidate to be jeered during the debate—both times Paul advocated a non-interventionist foreign policy. Alan Colmes, in the post-debate analysis, stated that Paul drew the most spirited reaction of any candidate, both positive and negative.

This Republican debate also revealed that the Republican contenders think America will go bankrupt if spending policies are not changed.

Thompson hit on a theme on which all of the debaters seemed to agree, that out-of-control spending is bankrupting America: "We're spending the money of our grand kids and kids yet to be born", Thompson said.

Giuliani accused Fred Thompson of being the "biggest obstacle to tort reform". Giuliani, touting his record as New York City mayor, said, "I brought down crime 60%", and called for school choice.

Regarding health care, Ron Paul said that "managed care isn't working" and that "drug companies lobby for managed care". Paul said, "We could take care of these poor people if we weren't trying to maintain an empire overseas". Ron Paul hit continued to discuss the issue of military non-interventionism, "70% of Americans want war over with and are sick and tired of big government at home and overseas". They want their "civil liberties and not allow government to spend endlessly and bankrupt us". Paul also answered questions related to his experience with Medicaid and endorsed allowing civil unions for same-sex couples country-wide, with marriage itself handled solely by religious institutions.

Mike Huckabee defended the "sanctity of human life, it is one of the defining issues of our culture" and on health care promoted "personalization not privatization. We do not have health care system, we have a maze. It's a health care crisis".

FOX News Channel and its affiliates moderated and televised the debate.

- CFR transcript
- New York Times transcript
- Washington Post video
- Fox News video
- Video with Closed Caption

=== October 25, 2007 - Sioux City, Iowa ===
AARP and IPTV held their second presidential candidate forum at the Orpheum Theater in Sioux City. Of the candidates invited, only former Arkansas Governor Mike Huckabee and U.S. Senator John McCain attended. The forum was webcast live but was not aired on PBS stations across the country as originally planned.

Due to the absence of most candidates, the format was changed to "allow Sen. John McCain and Gov. Mike Huckabee to discuss the issues of health and financial security with Iowa caucus-goers. The format included opening remarks, questions from moderator Dean Borg of IPTV, Sioux City Journal readers and those selected in the audience."

AARP video

=== November 28, 2007 - St. Petersburg, Florida ===
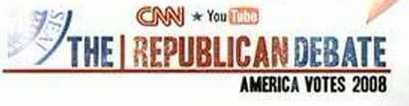

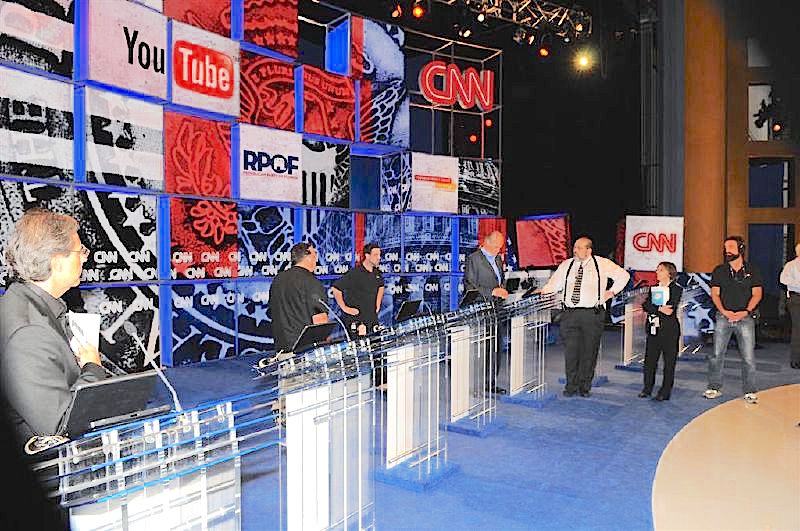
Debate stage

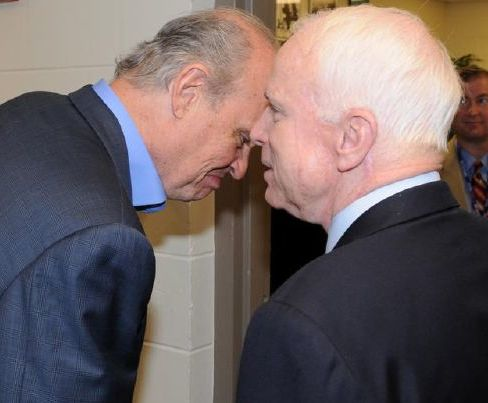
Thompson and McCain converse backstage prior to the debate

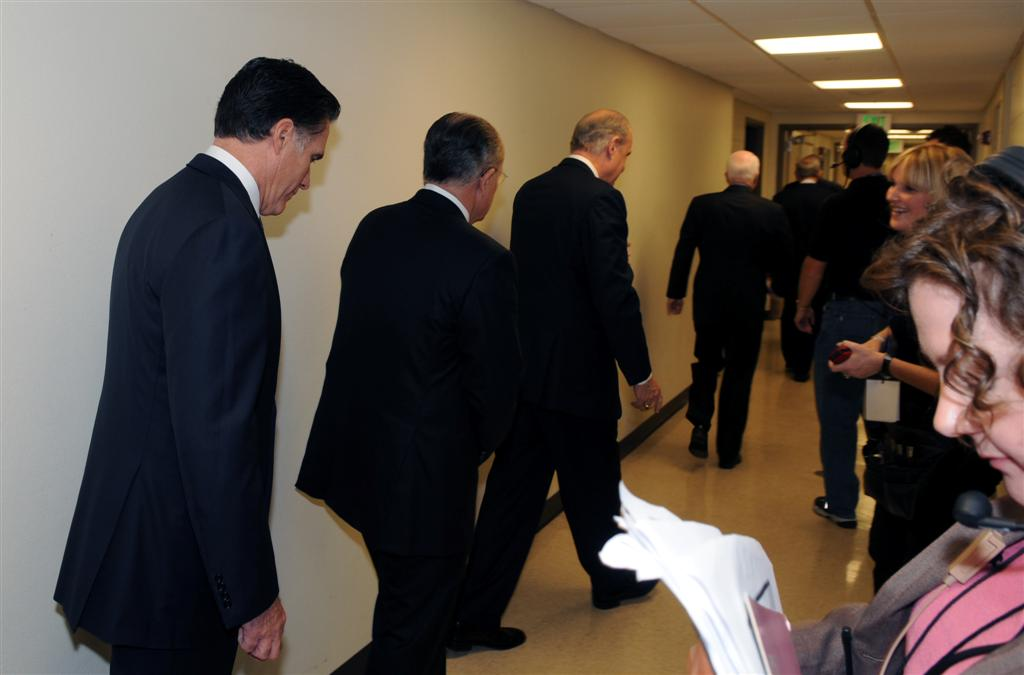
Candidates backstage right before the start of the debate

This debate is known as the "YouTube" debate. CNN planned it with a simulcast on CNN en Español (in the Spanish language). Internet services YouTube and Google also participated, allowing them to stream the event live and have clips for future use. Video questions had to be submitted by November 25 to YouTube . According to Nielsen Media Research, the debate drew a record Cable TV audience for a presidential primary debate, an estimated 4.4 million viewers.

The debate format permitted audience applause and boos—something that had been uncommon in the debates.

Several candidates cited scheduling conflicts with the original date, September 17, 2007, so it was rescheduled. The invited candidates are Rudy Giuliani, Mike Huckabee, Duncan Hunter, John McCain, Ron Paul, Mitt Romney, Tom Tancredo, and Fred Thompson. Alan Keyes was not invited. All invited candidates accepted, and all appeared.

Thirty-three questions were chosen for the debate, with Anderson Cooper - the moderator - determining which candidates would respond to each question. Giuliani spoke 20 times, for a total of 16:38. Mitt Romney spoke 19 times, for a total of 13 minutes and 18 seconds. Fred Thompson and John McCain each spoke 12 times, for 12:16 & 11:00, respectively. Mike Huckabee spoke 11 times, for a total of 10:00. Paul spoke 9 times, for a total of 7:43. Hunter spoke 7 times, for a total of 5:06, and Tancredo spoke 7 times, for a total of 3:49. Mike Huckabee was not given a question to answer until minute 26, while Ron Paul's first question was given after the first half-hour.

CNN's on-line viewer poll shows Ron Paul the winner of the debate with 49% of the vote. Viewers found Rudy Giuliani to have the most disappointing performance, with 27% of the vote.

Forty-four percent of Florida Republicans who said they were undecided surveyed by InsiderAdvantage/Majority Opinion Research judged that Mike Huckabee won this debate, whereas 18% thought Rudy Giuliani won, 13% felt that Mitt Romney won, and 10% picked John McCain. No other participant was selected as the debate's winner by more than 5% of those surveyed. The poll's margin of error was +/- 6%. An InsiderAdvantage/Majority Opinion Research survey of over 1,035 decided & undecided Iowa Republicans taken during the last 20 minutes of the debate found that 32% thought Huckabee won the debate, while 16% judged that Romney won, 12% felt that Giuliani won, and 10% picked John McCain. In this poll, Fred Thompson was chosen by 7% and Ron Paul was chosen by 6% as the debate's winner. No other participant was selected as the debate's winner by more than 2% of those surveyed.

John McCain and Ron Paul had a notable exchange over the Iraq War and the Vietnam War. McCain stated that troops wanted the US government to "let them win." Ron Paul replied "The real question you have to ask is why do I get the most money from active duty officers and military personnel?" McCain also called Paul an isolationist, saying "We allowed Hitler to come to power with that kind of isolationism." Paul replied that McCain was confusing isolationism with non-intervention, "I want to trade with people, talk with people, travel, but I don't want to send troops overseas using force to tell them how to live."

During breaks, ads created by each campaign were aired. Fred Thompson's ad attacked Mitt Romney and Mike Huckabee, to which they were allowed to respond.

CNN was criticized for not revealing during the debate that Keith Kerr, an openly gay military general who had submitted a question and spoke during the debate, was on a campaign advisory organization supporting Hillary Clinton. CNN cut the question and candidate response in the subsequent airing of the debate. Los Angeles Times editorial writer Tim Rutten criticized CNN's handling of the debate, calling the network "corrupt" and accusing it of focusing the debate on immigration to benefit Lou Dobbs' ratings.

- Part 1 and Part 2 of the transcript at CNN.
- Entire Debate Video
- Video with Closed Caption

=== December 9, 2007 - Miami, Florida ===
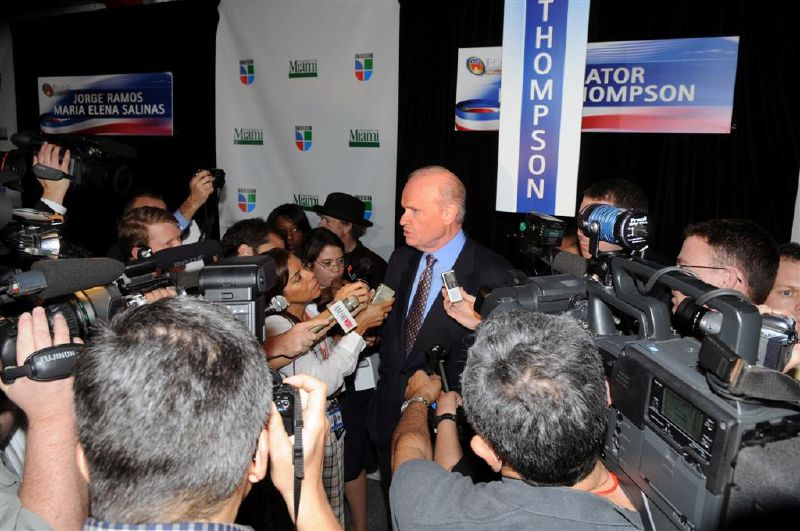
Fred Thompson in the Spin room following the debate

Univision, the nation's largest Spanish-speaking television network, sponsored a Republican debate hosted by the University of Miami on December 9, 2007.

The candidates in attendance were Rudy Giuliani, Mike Huckabee, Duncan Hunter, John McCain, Ron Paul, Mitt Romney, and Fred Thompson. Alan Keyes was not invited. Tom Tancredo was invited, but has vowed never to participate in a Spanish-language forum. As expected a prominent portion of the debate focused on immigration.

- Entire Debate Video
- Transcript

=== December 12, 2007 - Johnston, Iowa ===
The Des Moines Register and Iowa Public Television were originally to host a Republican debate in Johnston, Iowa, on January 5, 2008. The Iowa Republican Party, undecided on a date for the caucus, finally settled on January 3, two days before the planned debate. The debate was then moved to December 12, the day before the Des Moines Register hosted a Democratic debate. It aired live on Iowa Public Television, CNN, MSNBC, C-SPAN3, Fox News Channel, C-SPAN Radio, and Fox News Radio, with a prime time replay on C-SPAN2.

Rudy Giuliani, Mike Huckabee, Duncan Hunter, Alan Keyes, John McCain, Ron Paul, Mitt Romney, Tom Tancredo, and Fred Thompson participated in the 90-minute debate; thus, with 9 candidates in attendance, this became the single largest Republican debate of the 2008 cycle.

The moderator, Carolyn Washburn, editor of the Des Moines Register, was criticized by the media for being overly "strict" in dictating answer time and for barring questions on both Iraq and immigration.

- Entire Debate Video
- Video with Closed Caption
- NY Times Transcript

=== January 5, 2008 – Goffstown, New Hampshire ===
ABC, WMUR-TV and Facebook jointly hosted back-to-back Republican and Democratic debates from Saint Anselm College three days before the first-in-the-nation primary on Tuesday. According to Nielsen Media Research, this debate drew the largest televised audience of the Republican primaries with an estimated 7.35 million viewers.

The Republican debate included Rudy Giuliani, Mike Huckabee, John McCain, Ron Paul, Mitt Romney, and Fred Thompson. Charles Gibson moderated. Candidates were allowed to participate if they meet one of three criteria, "place first through fourth in Iowa, poll 5 percent or higher in one of the last four major New Hampshire surveys, or poll 5 percent or higher in one of the last four major national surveys." Thus, ABC News eliminated Republican Duncan Hunter.

ABC said the rules were quite inclusive, and that none of the candidates objected ahead of time. "In previous debates where the stage was more crowded you had to make sure all of the candidates got equal time," said David Chalian, ABC News political director. "Here you will have more time to go in depth on the issues."

- NY Times Transcript
- ABC News Transcript
- Entire Republican Debate Video
- Video with Closed Caption

=== January 6, 2008 – Milford, New Hampshire ===
A brunch forum housed by Chris Wallace with presidential candidates, originally to be sponsored by the New Hampshire Republican Party, was planned for broadcast on Fox News.

Candidates Ron Paul and Duncan Hunter were excluded by Fox News, though Paul got 10 percent of the Iowa vote while Giuliani, who was invited, got just 3 percent. Fox News said they had only enough room for "so many candidates."

New Hampshire Republican Party chair Fergus Cullen said on December 31, "Limiting the number of candidates who are invited to participate in debates is not consistent with the tradition of the first in the nation primary. The level playing field requires that all candidates be given an equal opportunity to participate–-not just a select few determined by the media prior to any votes being cast."

On January 5, following Fox News' continued refusal to allow a fair debate format, the New Hampshire Republican Party withdrew their sponsorship. Jay Leno invited Ron Paul to be a guest on the January 7 Tonight Show specifically because he felt Paul's exclusion was "unfair."

In a post-debate analysis by Fox News, Mitt Romney was declared the winner of the debate by several analysts. On top of this, Frank Luntz, a pollster with Fox News, indicated that Mitt Romney's performance was well received by his focus group of both conservatives and moderate conservatives.

- Text transcript of the debate from the Council on Foreign Relations
- Video transcript of debate from You Decide 2008
- Video with Closed Caption

=== January 10, 2008 - Myrtle Beach, South Carolina ===
Fox News hosted a debate at the Myrtle Beach Convention Center. All candidates except Duncan Hunter and Alan Keyes participated.

- CFR Transcript
- Video Transcript from You Decide 2008
- Video with Closed Caption

=== January 24, 2008 - Boca Raton, Florida ===
MSNBC hosted a two-hour debate at Florida Atlantic University. The organizers include the university, NBC, Leadership Florida, the Florida Press Association and the Florida Public Broadcasting Service Inc. It took place on Thursday, January 24, from 9 to 11 pm EST. A text message poll was taken after the debate asking viewers who they believed had won. The results showed Romney won with 41%, Paul with 40%, Huckabee with 8%, McCain with 7%, and Giuliani with 4%.

- Official web site
- Transcript
- Video with Closed Caption

=== January 30, 2008 - Simi Valley, California ===
The Los Angeles Times, Politico, CNN, and former First Lady Nancy Reagan, hosted a Republican debate in Simi Valley, California, at the Ronald Reagan Presidential Library. This was the first debate after Rudy Giuliani withdrew and the last before Super Tuesday. Ron Paul, Mitt Romney, Mike Huckabee, and John McCain participated.

- Video with Closed Caption
- CNN full transcript and video highlights

=== February 2, 2008 - New York, New York ===
MTV and MySpace hosted a two-party debate on February 2, 2008, "Closing Arguments: A Presidential Super Dialogue", broadcast live from the MTV studios. The candidates were two Democrats, Barack Obama and Hillary Clinton, and two Republicans, Ron Paul and Mike Huckabee. Invited but not attending were John McCain and Mitt Romney.
