= Wendell Goler =

American journalist (1949–2020)

Wendell Goler (July 26, 1949 – March 3, 2020) was the Senior White House and Foreign Affairs correspondent for Fox News Channel, joining the network on its inception in 1996. He retired on December 3, 2014. During his time at the network, he covered several major political stories, including the impeachment of President Bill Clinton and President Bush's post-September 11, 2001 policy initiatives.

== Early life and education ==
Goler was a native of Jackson, Michigan, and attended the University of Michigan.

== Career ==
In June 2011, Goler was moved from the White House correspondent position to an expanded role as part of changes in FNC's Washington Bureau. He was replaced by Ed Henry, who moved to FNC from Cable News Network.

Before joining FNC, Goler served as a White House correspondent for Associated Press Broadcast Services. Responsible for all radio and television network coverage of domestic and foreign presidential activities, Goler anchored all presidential news conferences for the service. Previously, he was a reporter for several Washington, D.C., stations, including WJLA-TV and WRC-TV, and was the afternoon drive anchor at WRC-AM.

== Death ==
Goler died on March 3, 2020, due to kidney failure.
