= Virgil A. Richard =

United States Army General

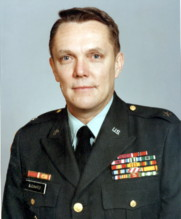
Brigadier General Richard

Brigadier General Virgil Almos Richard ( September 4, 1937 – September 11, 2013) was a US Army General who served 32 years of active military service of which 30 were devoted to Financial Management. Richard became an outspoken critic of the "Don't ask, don't tell" policy of the U.S. Armed Forces and gained national media attention as a part of a small group of high-ranking military officers who came out as gay after retirement.

== Early life ==
Richard was born in Anthony, Kansas, and grew up in rural Wakita, Oklahoma. He received his BS in accounting from Oklahoma State University (where he was a member of Phi Kappa Tau fraternity), his Master of Business Administration (Managerial Economics) from George Washington University and was a graduate of the Advanced Management Program of Columbia University, the U.S. Army Command and General Staff College and the U.S. Army War College. He was also an ROTC Distinguished Military Graduate.

== Career ==
Richard was an Officer of the Association of the United States Army chapters in Alaska and Indiana, Commander of the Harker Heights, Texas American Legion Post and Assistant State Treasurer of the Texas Department of the American Legion. He was also a Board Member of the Austin Exchange Club, The Texas District Exchange Clubs, and formerly a Board Member of the Capital City Men's Chorus in Austin, Texas.

He is a recipient of the Army Distinguished Service Medal, the Bronze Star with 1 Oak Leaf Cluster, the Legion of Merit with 4 Oak Leaf Clusters, Army Meritorious Service Medal with two Oak Leaf Clusters, Joint Service Commendation Medal, and the Army Commendation Medal with one Oak Leaf Cluster.

- Army Distinguished Service Medal
- Legion of Merit with four oak leaf clusters
- Bronze Star with one oak leaf cluster
- Meritorious Service Medal with two oak leaf clusters
- Joint Service Commendation Medal
- Army Commendation Medal with oak leaf cluster

== Personal life ==
Richard had three sons from his marriage to the late Bonnie Raylene Farrar. Throughout his military career, Richard had assignments in Honolulu, HI, Anchorage, AK, Indianapolis, IN, Washington, DC, and retired in 1991 at Fort Hood, TX. From 1998 until his death, he lived in Austin, Texas with his partner of 16 years, David W. Potter.
