= Alfred I. duPont–Columbia University Award =

Award honoring excellence in broadcast and digital journalism

- Awarded for: The best in television, radio, and digital journalism
- Location: North Carolina
- Country: United States
- Presented by: Columbia University Graduate School of Journalism
- Website: dupont.org

The Alfred I. duPont–Columbia University Award honors excellence in broadcast and digital journalism in the public service and is considered one of the most prestigious awards in journalism. The awards were established in 1942 and administered until 1967 by Washington and Lee University's O. W. Riegel, Curator and Head of the Department of Journalism and Communications. Since 1968 they have been administered by the Columbia University Graduate School of Journalism in New York City, and are considered by some to be the broadcast equivalent of the Pulitzer Prize, another program administered by Columbia University.

Dedicated to upholding the highest journalism standards, the duPont awards inform the public about the contributions news organizations and journalists make to their communities, support journalism education and innovation, and cultivate a collective spirit for the profession.

The duPont-Columbia Awards were established by Jessie Ball duPont in memory of her husband Alfred I. du Pont. It is the most well-respected journalism-only award for broadcast journalism; starting in 2009, it began accepting digital submissions. The duPont, along with the George Foster Peabody Awards, rank among the most prestigious awards programs in all electronic media.

The duPont-Columbia jury selects the winners from programs that air in the United States between July 1 and June 30 of each year. Award winners receive batons in gold and silver designed by the American architect Louis I. Kahn. The gold baton, when awarded, is given exclusively in honor of truly outstanding broadcast journalism.

== Notable winners ==
In 2003, the first-ever foreign-language program was awarded a duPont-Columbia Award: CNN en Español and reporter Jorge Gestoso won a Silver Baton for investigative reporting on Argentina's desaparecidos.

In 2010, the first award for digital reporting was given to MediaStorm and photographer Jonathan Torgovnik for "Intended Consequences" about children born of rape in Rwanda.

In 2012, the first-ever theatrically released documentary film was honored by the duPont jury: the Oscar-nominated Hell and Back Again, about the war in Afghanistan and the struggles facing veterans when they return home.

== Note ==
All winners are listed on the website of the Columbia University Graduate School of Journalism.

== duPont Award ==
=== 1942 ===
- Fulton Lewis Jr.
- KGEI Radio, San Francisco

=== 1943 ===
- Raymond Gram Swing
- WLW Radio, Cincinnati
- WMAZ Radio, Macon, Georgia

=== 1944 ===
- H. V. Kaltenborn
- WJR Radio, Detroit
- WTAG Radio, Worcester, Massachusetts

=== 1945 ===
- Lowell Thomas
- KDKA Radio, Pittsburgh
- WNAX Radio, Yankton, South Dakota

=== 1946 ===
- Elmer Davis
- WHO Radio, Des Moines, Iowa
- WFIL Radio, Philadelphia

=== 1947 ===
- Edward R. Murrow
- WBBM Radio, Chicago
- WFIL Radio, Philadelphia

=== 1948 ===
- Henry J. Taylor
- KLZ Radio, Denver
- WLS Radio, Chicago

=== 1949 ===
- Morgan Beatty
- WNOX Radio, Knoxville, Tennessee
- WPIX-TV, New York
- WWJ Radio, Detroit
- Special Program Award—American Broadcasting Company and Association

=== 1950 ===
- John Cameron Swayze
- AVZ Radio, Hartford, Connecticut
- WFIL-TV, Philadelphia

=== 1951 ===
- Joseph C. Harsch
- WCAU Radio and WCAU-TV, Philadelphia
- WEEI Radio, Boston

=== 1952 ===
- Gerald W. Johnson
- WBNS-TV, Columbus, Ohio
- WMT Radio, Cedar Rapids, Iowa

=== 1953 ===
- Pauline Frederick
- WBZ Radio and WBZ-TV, Boston
- WOI-TV, Ames, Iowa

=== 1954 ===
- Eric Sevareid
- KGAK Radio, Gallup, New Mexico
- WHAS Radio, Louisville, Kentucky

=== 1955 ===
- Howard K. Smith
- WICC Radio, Bridgeport, Connecticut
- WTIC Radio, Hartford, Connecticut

=== 1956 ===
- Chet Huntley
- KNXT-TV, Los Angeles
- WFMT Radio, Chicago

=== 1957 ===
- Clifton Utley
- KARD-TV, Wichita, Kansas
- KRON-TV, San Francisco

=== 1958 ===
- David Brinkley
- KLZ-TV, Denver
- WSNY Radio, Schenectady

=== 1959 ===
- David Schoenbrun
- KOLN-TV, Lincoln, Nebraska
- WNTA-TV, Newark, New Jersey

=== 1960 ===
- Edward P. Morgan
- KDKA-TV, Pittsburgh
- WAVZ Radio, New Haven, Connecticut

=== 1961 ===
- Martin Agronsky
- KING-TV, Seattle
- KPFK Radio, Los Angeles

=== 1962 ===
- Howard K. Smith
- KVOA-TV, Tucson, Arizona
- WFMT Radio, Chicago

=== 1963 ===
- Louis M. Lyons
- WFBM Radio, Indianapolis, Indiana
- Silver Baton—WJZ-TV, Baltimore

=== 1964 ===
- WFTV, Orlando, Florida
- WRCV-TV, Philadelphia

=== 1965 ===
- Cecil Brown
- KTWO-TV, Casper, Wyoming
- WBBM-TV, Chicago
- WCCO Radio, Minneapolis
- WFBM-TV, Indianapolis, Indiana
- WHCU Radio, Ithaca, New York
- WRVR Radio, New York

== duPont–Columbia Award ==
=== 1969 ===
- Dr. Everett C. Parker
- KNBC-TV, Los Angeles, California, "The Slow Guillotine"
- KQED, San Francisco, for local coverage of the 1968 political campaigns
- National Educational Television and Public Broadcast Laboratory, "Defense and Domestic Needs: The Contest for Tomorrow" (produced by Alan Levin)
- NBC News, "First Tuesday: CBW (Chemical-Biological Warfare): The Secrets of Secrecy" (produced by Tom Pettit)
- WRKL Radio, Mount Ivy-New City, NY for outstanding coverage of the 1968 political campaigns
- WSB-TV, Atlanta, Georgia "Investigation of Organized Crime"

=== 1971 ===
- Kenneth A. Cox
- CBS News, Ernest Leiser; Russ Bensley; John Laurence, "Charlie Company"
- National Educational Television and Frederick Wiseman, "Hospital"
- NBC News and Fred Freed, "White Paper: Pollution is a Matter of Choice"
- WCCO-TV, Minneapolis, "Grunt's Little War"
- WOOD-TV, Grand Rapids, Dick Cheverton and Herb Thurman, "Our Poisoned World"

=== 1972 ===
- CBS News, John Sharnik and Eric Sevareid, "Justice in America"
- Group W, George Moynihan and Susan Garfield, "All The Kids Like That: Tommy's Story"
- KUTV, Salt Lake City, Richard Spratling, Diane Orr and Fred Edwards, "Warriors Without A Weapon"
- NBC News, William B. Hill and Tom Pettit, "First Tuesday: The Man from Uncle (Sam)" and "The FBI"
- NBC News, Martin Carr, "White Paper: This Child is Rated X"
- WABC-TV, Geraldo Rivera, "Drug Crisis in East Harlem"

=== 1973 ===
- Mike Wallace for outstanding reporting on CBS News "60 Minutes"
- CBS News, Perry Wolff, Robert Markowitz, and Charles Kuralt, "CBS Reports: ...But What If the Dream Comes True?"
- Group W, Dick Hubert and Paul Altmeyer, "The Search for Quality Education"
- KERA-TV, Dallas, for outstanding coverage of the 1972 political campaigns
- National Public Affairs Center for Television, for coverage of the 1972 political campaigns
- NBC News and Fred Freed, "White Paper: The Blue Collar Trap"
- WABC-TV, Richard Thruston Watkins, "Like It Is: Attica -- the Unanswered Questions"
- WNET-TV, New York, and Tony Batten, "The 51st State: Youth Gangs in the South Bronx"
- WNJT-TV, Trenton, New Jersey, Ken Stein and John Dimmer, "Towers of Frustration: Assignment: New Jersey"
- WTVJ-TV, Miami, "The Swift Justice of Europe" and "A Seed of Hope"

=== 1974 ===
- ABC News and Arthur Holch, "Inquiry: Chile: Experiment in Red"
- CBS News, Irv Drasnin, "CBS News Reports: You and the Commercial"
- Group W, Dick Hubert and Rod MacLeish "And the Rich Shall Inherit the Earth"
- KGW-TV, Portland, Oregon, Pete Maroney, "Death of a Slideshow" (parts one and two)
- KNX Radio, Los Angeles, California, for editorials on important community issues
- NBC News and Robert Northshield, "The Sins of the Fathers" (a segment of NBC Reports)
- National Public Affairs Center for Television and Elizabeth Drew, "Thirty Minutes With..."
- WBBM-TV, Chicago, Illinois, Judy Muntz, Jim Hatfield, and Lee Phillip, "The Rape of Paulette"
- WTIC-TV, Hartford, Connecticut, Jean Sablon and Bard Davis "The Nine-Year-Old in Norfolk Prison"

=== 1975 ===
- ABC News, Av Westin, "Close-Up"
- CBS News, Don Hewitt, 60 Minutes
- KFWB Radio, Los Angeles, "SLA 54th Street Shootout"
- KNXT, Los Angeles, "Why Me?" (Joe Saltzman, producer)
- NBC News, Fred Freed, "The Energy Crisis" (an NBC White Paper)
- NBC News, Series of Reports on Feeding the Poor
- National Public Affairs Center for Television, "Washington Week in Review"
- National Public Affairs Center for Television, Watergate coverage
- WNET-TV, New York and Frederick Wiseman, "Juvenile Court"
- TVTV and WNET, New York and David Loxton, Lord of the Universe
- WKY-TV, Oklahoma City and Bob Dotson, "Through the Looking Glass Darkly" (parts one, two, and three)
- WPVI-TV, Philadelphia, "Public Bridges and Private Riches"

=== 1976 ===
- KNBC, Burbank, California, Don Harris, "Prison Gangs"
- NBC Nightly News and Tom Pettit for a series on feeding the poor
- NPR, All Things Considered
- WBTV, Charlotte, for news and documentary programming
- WCCO, Minneapolis, Minnesota, David Moore, "Moore on Sunday"
- WCCO Radio, Minneapolis, for news and documentary programming
- WGBH, Boston, Roger Fisher, "Arabs and Israelis"
- WHEC, Rochester and Warren Doremus, "The Riots Plus Ten Years"
- WKYC, Cleveland and Brian Ross, "Teamster Power"
- WPLG, Miami and Clarence Jones, for crime reporting

=== 1978 ===
- Group W and Paul Wilkes, "Six American Families" (parts one, two, three, four, five, and six)
- KCET-TV, Los Angeles, "28 Tonight" (citing the segments National Lead and Number Our Days)
- KGW-TV, Portland, "The Timber Farmers"
- NBC News, "Human Rights: A Soviet-American Debate" (moderated by Edwin Newman) and "NBC Reports: The Struggle for Freedom" (anchored by Garrick Utley)
- Walter Cronkite and the "CBS Evening News"
- WBBM-TV, Chicago, Scott Craig and Bill Kurtis, "Once a Priest"
- WFAA-TV, Dallas "Clear and Present Danger"
- WNET-TV, New York and WETA-TV, Washington D.C., "The MacNeil/Lehrer Report" for "Carter's Energy Plan," "Woodward-Bernstein: Frost Interview," and "Korea and Congress: the Scandal So Far"
- WNET-TV, New York "The Police Tapes"

=== 1979 ===
- Associated Press Radio, "The New South: Shade Behind the Sunbelt" (credited to Julie Frederikse)
- KOOL-TV, Phoenix, Burt Kennedy, "Water: Arizona's Most Precious Resource"
- KPIX-TV, San Francisco, Robert Klein and Richard Hart, "Laser Con-Fusion"
- National Geographic Society and WQED-TV, Pittsburgh, "The Living Sands of Namib" (credited to Thomas Skinner and Patricia Northrup)
- NBC News, Robert Rogers and Garrick Utley, "NBC News Reports: Africa's Defiant White Tribe"
- WBBM-TV, Chicago, Illinois, Gail Sikevitz, Scott Craig, Jim Hatfield, and Mort Crim for documentary reporting, especially "Signs of Love" and "A Matter of Policy"
- WFAA-TV, Dallas, Texas, Byron Harris for investigative report
- WGBH-FM, Boston, "Banned in Chelsea" (credited to David Freudberg)
- WGBH-TV, Boston and William Cran, "WORLD: Chachaji: My Poor Relation" and John Angier, "NOVA: The Final Frontier"
- WMHT-TV, Schenectady, "Capital Punishment: Inside Albany"
- WPLG-TV, Miami and Clarence Jones for investigative reporting
- Special Award: Richard Salant

=== 1980 ===
- ABC News, "Closeup: Arson: Fire for Hire!" (reported by Brit Hume) and "World News Tonight: Second to None?"
- Bill Moyers, for outstanding reporting on CBS News and WNET-TV, New York
- CBS News, "CBS Reports: The Boat People" (produced by Andrew Lack and reported by Ed Bradley) and "60 Minutes"
- KCTS-TV, Seattle, "Do I Look Like I Want to Die?"
- KDFW-TV, Dallas, for investigative reporting
- KUTV-TV, Salt Lake City, "Clouds of Doubt"
- KXL Radio, Portland, "The Air Space -- How Safe?"
- WGBH-TV, Boston, "WORLD: F-16: Sale of the Century" on PBS (reported by Andrew Cockburn)
- WHA-TV, Madison, Catalyst Films and Wisconsin Educational Television Network, "An American Ism: Joe McCarthy" (parts 1 and 2, directed by Glenn Silber)

=== 1981 ===
- SILVER BATON ABC News, "The Iran Crisis: America Held Hostage"
- SILVER BATON Ed Bradley and CBS News, "CBS Reports: Blacks in America: With All Deliberate Speed?"
- SILVER BATON Group W and KYW-TV, Philadelphia, Pennsylvania; WBZ-TV, Boston, Massachusetts; WJZ-TV, Baltimore Maryland for I-Team Investigations
- SILVER BATON Mississippi Center for Educational Television, Jackson, Mississippi, "William Faulkner: A Life on Paper" (directed by Robert Squier)
- SILVER BATON National Public Radio, "All Things Considered" and "Morning Edition"
- SILVER BATON Perry Miller Adato and WNET-TV, New York, New York, "Picasso: A Painter's Diary" (parts 1, 2, and 3)
- SILVER BATON Red Cloud Productions and WGBY-TV, Springfield, Massachusetts, "Joan Robinson: One Woman's Story" (parts 1, 2, and 3)
- SILVER BATON Roger Mudd and CBS News, "CBS Reports: Teddy"
- SILVER BATON Reuven Frank and NBC News, "White Paper: If Japan Can... Why Can't We?"
- SILVER BATON Special Independent Production Award: Carol Mon Pere, Sandra Nichols and KTEH-TV, San Jose, California "The Battle of Westlands"
- SILVER BATON Special Tribute: Walter Cronkite
- SILVER BATON Walter Jacobson and WBBM-TV, Chicago, Illinois, "Perspectives"
- SILVER BATON WLS-TV, Chicago, Illinois and Chicago Sun-Times, "The Accident Swindlers"

=== 1982 ===
- SILVER BATON ABC News, "America Held Hostage: The Secret Negotiations"
- SILVER BATON CBS News, Charles Kuralt, "Sunday Morning"
- SILVER BATON CBS News, Dan Rather, "CBS REPORTS: The Defense of the United States"
- SILVER BATON David Productions and ABC News, "CLOSEUP: Can't it Be Anyone Else?" (produced by Bill Couturié)
- SILVER BATON KCTS-TV, Dr. Willard Gaylin, "Hard Choices"
- SILVER BATON National Public Radio, "Father Cares: The Last of Jonestown" (produced by Deborah Amos and written by James Reston Jr. and Noah Adams)
- SILVER BATON Robert Spencer and WTTW-TV, Chicago, Illinois, "Six O'clock and All's Well"
- SILVER BATON SPECIAL INDEPENDENT PRODUCTION AWARD: KTEH-TV, San Jose, California and John Else, "The Day After Trinity"
- SILVER BATON SPECIAL TRIBUTE: David Brinkley
- SILVER BATON WBBM-TV, Chicago, Illinois, "Election Night Coverage"
- SILVER BATON WCCO-TV, Minneapolis, Minnesota, Dave Moore, The Moore Report
- SILVER BATON WGBH-TV, Boston, Massachusetts, "WORLD"
- SILVER BATON WPLG-TV, Miami, Florida, "The Billion Dollar Ghetto"

=== 1984 ===
- SILVER BATON CBS News, "60 Minutes: Good Cop, Bad Cop; Honor Thy Children; and Go Park It in Tokyo"
- SILVER BATON John Camp and WBRZ, Baton Rouge, Louisiana, For investigative reporting
- SILVER BATON KCTS-TV, Seattle, Washington and Face to Face Productions, "Rape: Face to Face" (directed by Nicholas Kendall and Keet Neville)
- SILVER BATON KRON-TV, San Francisco, California, "The War Within" (Greg Lyon and Jonathan Dann, reporters)
- SILVER BATON National Public Radio, "The Most Dangerous Game: Nuclear Face-off in Europe"
- SILVER BATON NBC News, "News Overnight"
- SILVER BATON Richard Threlkeld, Status Reports on "ABC World News Tonight"
- SILVER BATON SPECIAL INDEPENDENT PRODUCTION AWARD: Jon Alpert and NBC News, "American Survival" (aired on Today)
- SILVER BATON Terry Drinkwater, Cancer Reports on "CBS Evening News"
- SILVER BATON WBBM-TV, Chicago, Illinois, "Killing Crime: A Police Cop-Out"
- SILVER BATON WMAQ-TV, Chicago, Illinois, "Unit 5: The Chicago Police Investigations"
- SILVER BATON WSMV-TV, Nashville, Tennessee, "Innocent Shame: The Legacy of Child Sexual Abuse"
- SILVER BATON WTCN-TV, Minneapolis, Minnesota, "Herpes is Forever"

=== 1985 ===
- SILVER BATON ABC News, "Nightline"
- SILVER BATON ABC News, "World News Tonight: US-USSR: A Balance of Powers"
- SILVER BATON Brian Ross and Ira Silverman, Outstanding investigative reporting on NBC News
- SILVER BATON CBS News, "60 Minutes: Lenell Geter's in Jail"
- SILVER BATON KOSU Radio, Stillwater, Oklahoma, "Selling the Public Spectrum"
- SILVER BATON KRON-TV, San Francisco, California, "Climate of Death"
- SPECIAL INDEPENDENT PRODUCTION AWARD: Medvideo, Ltd. and Group W, "Whispering Hope: Unmasking the Mystery of Alzheimer's"
- Special Independent Production Award: Quest Productions and PBS, "The First Fifty Years: Reflections on US-Soviet Relations"
- SILVER BATON Suburban Cablevision, Avenel, New Jersey, "Right to Know: Hillside: A Desegregation Story"
- SILVER BATON The Documentary Consortium and PBS "Frontline: Mind of a Murderer"
- SILVER BATON WGBH-TV and PBS, Boston, Massachusetts, "Vietnam: A Television History"
- SILVER BATON WJXT-TV, Jacksonville, Florida, "The Smell of Money"
- SILVER BATON WJZ-TV, Baltimore, Maryland, "Baby Boom: The Pig in the Python"

=== 1986 ===
- GOLD BATON ABC News, "Nightline: South Africa"
- SILVER BATON Cable News Network and IMAGO, Ltd., "Iran: In the Name of God"
- SILVER BATON CBS News, "CBS Evening News: Afghanistan: Operation Blackout" (with footage from Mike Hoover)
- SILVER BATON Chris-Craft Television Productions and Churchill Films, "Down for the Count--an Inside Look at Boxing" (aired on Frontline)
- SILVER BATON Desert West News, Flagstaff, Arizona, For a series of radio reports on the American Sanctuary Movement
- SILVER BATON KNX Radio, Los Angeles, California, "Assignment 84/85"
- SILVER BATON Nancy Montoya and KGUN-TV, Tucson, Arizona, For outstanding reporting
- SILVER BATON NBC News, "The Real 'Star Wars'--Defense in Space"
- SILVER BATON WCAU-TV, Philadelphia, Pennsylvania, Coverage of the MOVE siege
- SILVER BATON WCCO-TV, Minneapolis, Minnesota, "The Moore Report"
- SILVER BATON WDVM-TV, Washington, DC, Investigation of Dr. Milan Vuitch
- SILVER BATON WNET-TV, New York, New York, and PBS, "The Brain"

=== 1987 ===
- GOLD BATON CBS News, "CBS Reports: The Vanishing Family--Crisis in Black America", presented by Bill Moyers
- SILVER BATON ABC News with Ted Koppel, "45/85"
- SILVER BATON Chedd-Angier Production Company and The Documentary Consortium, "Frontline: Sue the Doctor? on PBS
- SILVER BATON Drew Associates and PBS, "For Auction: An American Hero"
- SILVER BATON KING-TV, Seattle, Washington, "Washington 2000"
- SILVER BATON KTUL-TV, Tulsa, Oklahoma, "Tulsa's Golden Missionary"
- SILVER BATON KYTV-TV, Springfield, Missouri, For outstanding reporting by Erin Hayes
- SILVER BATON NBC News, Investigative Reporting on NBC Nightly News, citing the work of Brian Ross and Mark Nykanen
- SILVER BATON NBC Radio News, For coverage of the American raid on Tripoli
- SILVER BATON WBZ-TV, Boston, Massachusetts, "Afghanistan: The Untold Story"
- SILVER BATON WCBS-TV, New York, New York, "No Place to Call Home"
- SILVER BATON WCCO-TV, Minneapolis, Minnesota, "State of Texas vs. Steven Lynn Fossum"
- SILVER BATON WMAQ-TV, Chicago, Illinois, "Cicero: Community of Controversy"

=== 1988 ===
- GOLD BATON Blackside, Inc., Eyes on the Prize: America's Civil Rights Years, 1954-1965
- SILVER BATON ABC News, "20/20: By His Father's Hand: The Zumwalkts"
- SILVER BATON CBS News, "48 Hours on Crack Street"
- SILVER BATON Florentine Films, "Huey Long"
- SILVER BATON KMOV-TV, St. Louis, Missouri, "Sauget: City of Shame"
- SILVER BATON NBC News, Robert Bazell, For Coverage of the AIDS epidemic
- SILVER BATON Pam Zekman and WBBM-TV, Chicago, Illinois, For Investigative Reporting
- SILVER BATON Roberta Baskin and WJLA-TV, Washington, D.C. For Investigative Reporting
- SILVER BATON WCCO-TV, Minneapolis, Minnesota, For the I-Team
- SILVER BATON WFAA-TV, Dallas, Texas, SMU Investigation
- SILVER BATON WJXT-TV, Jacksonville, Florida, Jacksonville, Florida, "Jacksonville's Roads: The Deadly Drive Home"
- SILVER BATON WLAP Radio, Lexington, Kentucky, "Passing On the Secret of Sexual Abuse"
- SILVER BATON WPLG-TV, Miami, Florida, "Florida: State of Neglect"

=== 1989 ===
- GOLD BATON CBS News, "60 Minutes"
- SILVER BATON ABC News, "Nightline: In the Holy Land"
- SILVER BATON CBS News, Coverage of the Persian Gulf by Alen Pizzey
- SILVER BATON KING-TV, Seattle, Washington, "Looking for Lincoln"
- SILVER BATON NBC News, "A Conversation with Mikhail Gorbachev, conducted by Tom Brokaw
- SILVER BATON Nina Totenberg and National Public Radio, Coverage of the Supreme Court Nominations
- SILVER BATON Public Affairs Television and Alvin H. Perlmutter, Inc., "Joseph Campbell and the Power of Myth with Bill Moyers"
- SILVER BATON WCAX-TV, Burlington, Vermont, "The Politics of Pollution"
- SILVER BATON WCVB-TV, Needham, Massachusetts, "We the Jury", reported by David Ropeik
- SILVER BATON WSMV-TV, Nashville, TN, for investigative reporting by Erin Hayes
- SILVER BATON WUSA-TV, Washington, D.C. "Thurgood Marshall: The Man", reported by Carl Rowan
- SILVER BATON WWOR-TV, Secaucus, New Jersey, "For the I-Team"

=== 1990 ===
- GOLD BATON WGBH and Frontline: "Remember My Lai," "The Spy Who Broke the Code," "Who Profits From Drugs?," "The Choice," and "Children of the Night"
- SILVER BATON ABC News and Koppel Communications, "The Koppel Report: Tragedy at Tiananmen--The Untold Story"
- SILVER BATON Byron Harris and WFAA-TV, Dallas, Texas, "Other People's Money"
- SILVER BATON CBS, Television and Radio Coverage of China
- SILVER BATON CNN, Coverage of China
- SILVER BATON Gardner Films and WETA, Washington, D.C., "Arab and Jew: Wounded Spirits in a Promised Land" on PBS
- SILVER BATON KCET-TV, Los Angeles, California, "For the Sake of Appearances," and "Expecting Miracles"
- SILVER BATON Kentucky Educational Television, "On Our Own Land" (produced by Anne Lewis) with Appalshop
- SILVER BATON Maryland Public Television, Owings Mills, Maryland, "Other Faces of AIDS"
- SILVER BATON National Public Radio, "AIDS and Black America: Breaking the Silence"
- SILVER BATON WBRZ, Baton Rouge, Louisiana, "The Best Insurance Commissioner Money Can Buy"
- SILVER BATON WJXT, Jacksonville, Florida, "Crack Crisis: A Cry for Action"

=== 1991 ===
- GOLD BATON WGBH-TV and Martin Smith Productions, "Frontline: Inside Gorbachev's USSR with Hedrick Smith"
- SILVER BATON ABC News, "Peter Jennings Reporting: From the Killing Fields"
- SILVER BATON Blackside Inc., "Eyes on the Prize II: America at the Racial Crossroads"
- SILVER BATON CBS News, "CBS Evening News with Dan Rather" for human stories behind the fall of Communist governments (reported by Dan Rather, Tom Fenton, Betsy Aaron, Anthony Mason and Peter Van Sant)
- SILVER BATON Exit Films, Cambridge, Massachusetts, "Near Death "
- SILVER BATON Helen Borten and National Public Radio for "Horizons: And Justice for All"
- SILVER BATON KCBS-AM, San Francisco, California, for coverage of the earthquake
- SILVER BATON KING-TV, Seattle, Washington, "Critical Choices: America's Health Care Crisis"
- SILVER BATON KQED-TV, San Francisco, California, Scott Pearson and Lewis Cohen, "Express: Shield for Abuse"
- SILVER BATON NBC News, "NBC Nightly News: Tragedy at Pine Ridge" (reported by Betty Rollin)
- SILVER BATON P.O.V. and WTVS-TV, "Who Killed Vincent Chin??
- SILVER BATON WCBD-TV, Charleston, South Carolina, Coverage of Hurricane Hugo
- SILVER BATON WJLA-TV, Washington D.C., "NFL Drug Testing: Illegal Procedure", for reporting on Forest Tennant by Roberta Baskin
- SILVER BATON WKYC-TV, Cleveland, Ohio, Dick Feagler for nightly commentaries

=== 1992 ===
- GOLD BATON PBS, Public Affairs Television, Bill Moyers, "After the War," "The Home Front," "Beyond Hate," "Amazing Grace"
- SILVER BATON ABC News, Peter Jennings, "A Line in the Sand: War or Peace?", "World News Tonight: Children in Crisis" and "World News Tonight: War in the Gulf: Answering Children's Questions"
- SILVER BATON CNN, Peter Arnett's Reports from Baghdad
- SILVER BATON KBDI-TV, Denver, Colorado, Carolyn Hales, Tierra O Muerte: Land or Death
- SILVER BATON KPIX-TV, San Francisco, Richard Saiz, California, "Wards of the State"
- SILVER BATON KWWL-TV, Waterloo, Iowa, "Cloud of Concern"
- SILVER BATON National Public Radio for coverage of the Gulf War
- SILVER BATON PBS, Friends of Le Chambon, Pierre Sauvage, "Weapons of the Spirit"
- SILVER BATON PBS, Frontline: High Crimes and Misdemeanors (reported by Bill Moyers)
- SILVER BATON WETA-TV and Florentine Films, Ken Burns, "The Civil War"
- SILVER BATON WFAA-TV, Dallas, Texas, Coverage of the Gulf War
- SILVER BATON WGBH-TV, Boston, Massachusetts, "Frontline: Innocence Lost" (produced by Ofra Bikel)
- SILVER BATON WTBS-TV, National Geographic Society, "Explorer: The Urban Gorilla"
- SILVER BATON Carole Langer WGBH-TV, Boston, Massachusetts, "Frontline: Who Killed Adam Mann?"

=== 1993 ===
- GOLD BATON National Public Radio, "All Things Considered," "Morning Edition," "Weekend Edition," Coverage of Clarence Thomas Nomination Hearings, Coverage of the 1992 Los Angeles Riots and Aftermath, Voices from the Backstairs, American Folklife Radio Project, and The Case Against Women: Sexism in the Court
- SILVER BATON ABC News, "Nightline" Coverage of the Los Angeles Riots
- SILVER BATON Bill Leonard, former producer at CBS News and director of the duPont Awards
- SILVER BATON CBS News, "60 Minutes: Made in China" (reported by Ed Bradley)
- SILVER BATON David Grubin Productions and KERA-TV, Dallas, Texas, "The American Experience: LBJ" on PBS
- SILVER BATON HBO, "Abortion: Desperate Choices" (America Undercover) (directed by Susan Froemke, Albert Maysles, and Deborah Dickson)
- SILVER BATON KCNC-TV, Denver, Colorado, "Erin's Life"
- SILVER BATON Kitchell Films and "P.O.V.", "Berkeley in the Sixties"
- SILVER BATON KSTP-TV, St. Paul, Minnesota, "Who's Watching the Store"
- SILVER BATON KTTV-TV, Los Angeles, California, "Cops on Trial: The Rodney King Case"
- SILVER BATON Louisiana Public Broadcasting, Baton Rouge, Louisiana "Louisiana Boys" (produced by the Center for New American Media)
- SILVER BATON Lucky Duck Productions and Nickelodeon, "Nick News: W/5"
- SILVER BATON WCPO-TV, Cincinnati, Ohio, "Made in the USA?"
- SILVER BATON WCVB-TV, Boston, Massachusetts, "Chronicle" and Environmental Reporting (by David Ropeik)

=== 1994 ===
- GOLD BATON Fred Friendly, winner for his lifetime contribution to the ethics and practice of journalism
- SILVER BATON ABC News, "20/20: The Gift of Life" (Bob Brown, reporter)
- SILVER BATON CNN, Coverage of Bosnia by Christiane Amanpour, Jim Clancy, Brent Sadler, and Jackie Shymanski
- SILVER BATON ETC Films, Barbara Kopple, "Fallen Champ: The Untold Story of Mike Tyson" on NBC
- SILVER BATON KRON-TV, San Francisco, "In the Shadow of the Wall"
- SILVER BATON M.W. Productions, KQED "Harry Bridges: A Man and His Union" (directed by Berry Minott)
- SILVER BATON PBS and Jigsaw Productions, "The Pacific Century"
- SILVER BATON WBAI/Pacifica Radio for "Massacre: The Story of East Timor" (produced by Amy Goodman and Allan Nairn)
- SILVER BATON WBFF-TV, Baltimore, Maryland, "Justice on Trial/The Lost Generation/Walking Wounded" (reported by Deborah Weiner)
- SILVER BATON WGBH-TV, Boston, Massachusetts, "Frontline," The Best Campaign Money Can Buy (produced by the Center for Investigative Reporting)
- SILVER BATON Wisconsin Public Television, "Move Over: Women and the '92 Campaign"
- SILVER BATON WPLG-TV, Miami, Florida, "Armed Enemies of Castro"
- SILVER BATON WTVJ-TV, Miami, Florida The Coverage of Hurricane Andrew

=== 1995 ===
- GOLD BATON ABC News
  - "World News Tonight: Coverage of Haiti by Linda Pattillo"
  - "American Agenda: Women's Health Week" (Sally Holm, Rick Kaplan, Jackie Judd, Tim Johnson, George Strait)
  - "Day One: Smoke Screen" (John Martin, correspondent)
  - "Turning Point: Inside the Struggle: The Amy Biehl Story"
  - "Peter Jennings Reporting: While America Watched--The Bosnia Tragedy"
- SILVER BATON Blackside Inc., "The Great Depression" on PBS
- SILVER BATON CBS News, "60 Minutes: Semipalatinsk" (Ed Bradley, correspondent)
- SILVER BATON Charles Kuralt, for reporting on CBS News, "Sunday Morning"
- SILVER BATON CNN, Coverage of the Moscow Uprising (Steve Hurst, Claire Shipman, Eileen O'Connor, Gene Randall, Walter Rogers, Hugh Williams)
- SILVER BATON Michael Skoler and NPR for coverage of Rwanda
- SILVER BATON NPR for coverage of South Africa (Ray Suarez, Ann Cooper)
- SILVER BATON PBS, "Frontline: Romeo and Juliet in Sarajevo"
- SILVER BATON Video Verite, "I Am a Promise: The Children of Stanton Elementary School" on HBO
- SILVER BATON WCCO-TV, Minneapolis, Minnesota "Missing the Beat" (Caroline Lowe, reporter)
- SILVER BATON WGBH, "Frontline: Innocence Lost: The Verdict" on PBS (produced by Ofra Bikel)
- SILVER BATON Wisconsin Public Television, "My Promised Land: Bernice Cooper's Story" on PBS
- SILVER BATON WTVS-TV, Detroit, Michigan, HKO Media and Children's Hospital of Michigan "The Last Hit: Children and Violence"

=== 1996 ===
- Gold Baton: Daniel Schorr, his career spans CBS News, CNN and NPR
- ABC News, "Turning Point: Of Human Bondage: Slavery Today"
- ABC News, "World News Tonight": American Agenda: "Medicine Man"; "Vanishing Breed"; "Political Waters"
- Blackside Inc., "America's War on Poverty" on PBS
- Billy Golfus and David E. Simpson, "When Billy Broke His Head...and Other Tales of Wonder" (broadcast on PBS)
- Brian Lapping Associates, London, United Kingdom, "Watergate" on The Discovery Channel
- NPR for political coverage (such as the work of Elizabeth Arnold)
- PBS, the Center for Investigative Reporting and Telesis Productions "Frontline: School Colors"
- PBS, "P.O.V., The American Documentary Inc. "Complaints of a Dutiful Daughter"
- PBS, "The American Experience: The Battle of the Bulge (produced by Thomas Lennon); FDR (produced by David Grubin); and The Way West" (produced by Ric Burns)
- WMAL (AM), Washington, D.C., for "American History -- The Disney Version" (John Matthews, reporter)
- WTVJ-TV and Kerry Sanders, Miami, Florida, "Coverage of Haiti"
- WXYZ-TV, Detroit, Michigan, "Target 7: Michigan's Secret Soldiers" (Shellee Smith, reporter)

=== 1997 ===
- GOLD BATON Brian Lapping Associates, "Yugoslavia: Death of a Nation" on The Discovery Channel and the BBC
- SILVER BATON ABC News, "Nightline: The State vs. Simpson: The Verdict," "Nightline: Journey of a Country Doctor," "Nightline: Town Meeting: Thou Shall Not Kill"
- SILVER BATON CBS News, "60 Minutes: Punishing Saddam" (reported by Lesley Stahl), "60 Minutes: Too Good to be True" (reported by Morley Safer)
- SILVER BATON HBO, "America Undercover: High on Crack Street: Lost Lives in Lowell," and "The Celluloid Closet"
- SILVER BATON KREM-TV, Spokane, Washington, "The Wenatchee Child Sex Ring"
- SILVER BATON NBC News, "Dateline: Class Photo" (Neal Shapiro, John Block, Len Cannon, Geraldine Moriba-Meadows, Marc Rosenwasser)
- SILVER BATON Norman Corwin and Mary Beth Kirchner for "Fifty Years After 14 August" on NPR
- SILVER BATON NOVA/WGBH-TV, "NOVA: Plague Fighters" (directed by Ric Esther Bienstock) on PBS
- SILVER BATON NPR and Anne Garrels for coverage of the former Soviet Union
- SILVER BATON Public Broadcasting Service, "Buckminster Fuller: Thinking Out Loud" (aired on American Masters)
- SILVER BATON Radio Smithsonian for "Black Radio: Telling It Like It Was" on PRI
- SILVER BATON WFAA-TV, Dallas, Texas, For investigate reporting by Robert Riggs
- SILVER BATON WGBH, Frontline, "Shtetl" on PBS

=== 1998 ===
- Gold Baton: WGBH-TV, Boston, Massachusetts, Frontline, for:** "Murder, Money and Mexico
  - "The Choice 96"
  - "Secret Daughter"
  - "Innocence Lost: The Plea" (produced by Ofra Bikel)
- ABC News, "Primetime Live: Debt Reckoning"
- Blowback Productions, "CIA: America's Secret Warriors"
- CBS News, "CBS Reports: Enter the Jury Room", reported by Richard Schlesinger
- Center for New America Media, "Vote for Me: Politics in America"
- KCET-TV, Los Angeles, California, "The Great War and the Shaping of the 20th Century"
- KTCA-TV, St. Paul, Minnesota, Minnesota, "NewsNight Minnesota: Unisys"
- KUSC Radio, Los Angeles, "Marketplace" on Public Radio International
- NBC News and Scripps Howard News Productions, "Why Can't We Live Together?", reported by Tom Brokaw
- Public Broadcasting Service, "Cadillac Desert: An American Nile"
- WABC-TV, New York, "Room 104: The Overcrowding Crisis"
- Wisconsin Public Television, "Welcome to Poverty Hollow"

=== 1999 ===
- Gold Baton: WGBH-TV, Boston, "NOVA: Everest: The Death Zone"; "The Brain Eater"; "Supersonic Spies"; "China's Mysterious Mummies"; "Coma"
- ABC News and Ted Koppel, "Nightline: Crime and Punishment"
- CBS News and Mike Wallace, "60 Minutes: Investigation of the International Pharmaceutical Industry"
- CBS News, Eric Engberg and Vince Gonzales, "CBS Evening News: Tomb of the Unknowns"
- Dan Collison, Rebecca Perl and Tom Jennings, "This American Life: Scenes from a Transplant" on PRI
- Independent Television Service, Tony Buba and Raymond Henderson, "Struggles in Steel: A Story of African American Steelworkers"
- PBS, Laura Angelica Simón and Tracey Trench, "POV: Fear and Learning at Hoover Elementary"
- Thirteen/WNET, New York, and Vanessa Roth, "Taken In: The Lives of America's Foster Children"
- WBBM-TV, Chicago, and Carol Marin, "Coverage of Congressman William Lipinski Campaign"
- WEWS-TV, Cleveland, and Bill Shiel, "Final Mission"
- WMAQ-TV, Chicago, "Strip Searched at O'Hare"
- WRAL-TV, Raleigh, and Stuart Watson for a series of investigate reports on military medicine

=== 2000 ===
- Gold Baton: Public Affairs Television Bill Moyers, "Facing the Truth"
- ABC News and Diane Sawyer, "20/20: The Unwanted Children of Russia"
- CBS News and Bob Simon, "60 Minutes II: The Shame of Srebrenica"
- CNN and Candy Crowley, for coverage of the impeachment and trial of President Bill Clinton
- Stanley Nelson, "The Black Press: Soldiers without Swords" on PBS
- New England Cable News, Newton, Mass., for in-depth reporting
- PBS, "POV: If I Can't Do It" (directed by Walter Brock)
- SoundVision Productions, Berkeley, "The DNA Files" on NPR (hosted by John Hockenberry)
- WGBH-TV, Boston, "Frontline: The Triumph of Evil" on PBS (reported by Steve Bradshaw)
- WMTW-TV, Auburn, Maine & Christine Young for investigative reports on the Christian Civic League
- WTHR-TV, Indianapolis, "Guarding the Guardians"
- KTVX-TV, Salt Lake City, and Chris Vanocur for investigative reporting on the Olympics' bribery scandal
- Youth Radio, Berkeley, "Emails from Kosovo" on NPR

=== 2001 ===
- Gold Baton: American RadioWorks, "Massacre at Cuska" on NPR (produced by Stephen Smith and Michael Montgomery)
- ABC News, "Nightline: AIDS in Africa" (reported by Dave Marash)
- CBS News, "CBS Evening News: Armed America" (reported by Vince Gonzales)
- Crowing Rooster Arts, New York, "Abandoned: The Betrayal of America's Immigrants" on WGBH-TV (directed by David Belle and Nicholas Wrathall and aired on Independent Lens)
- KHOU-TV, Houston, "Deadly Tires?" (reported by Anna Werner)
- KXLY-TV, Spokane, and Tom Grant, "Public Funds, Private Profit"
- Insight News TV, London, Sorious Samura and CNN Productions, "Cry Freetown"
- NBC News, "Dateline: The Paper Chase" (reported by John Larson)
- NPR, "Radio Expeditions" (produced by Carolyn Jensen)
- Steeplechase Films, "New York: A Documentary Film" on PBS
- WCPO-TV, Cincinnati, and Laurie Quinlivan, for the I-Team stadium investigation
- WGBH-TV, Boston, "Frontline: John Paul II: Millennial Pope" on PBS (produced by Helen Whitney)

=== 2002 ===
- ABC News, Terence Wrong and Peter Bull, "Hopkins 24/7" (reported by Sylvia Chase)
- CBS News, David Martin and Mary Walsh, for reporting on national security on "CBS Evening News" and "60 Minutes II"
- CBS News, Steve Kroft, and Leslie Cockburn, "60 Minutes: America's Worst Nightmare?"
- CBS News and Steve Hartman, "CBS Evening News: Everybody Has Story"
- CNN, Nic Robertson and Jonathan Miller "Northern Ireland: Dying for Peace" (aired on CNN Presents)
- Court TV, "The Interrogation of Michael Crowe" (produced by Jonathan Greene and Marc Wallace)
- KCBS-TV, Los Angeles, and Randy Paige, "Poison Paint"
- KIRO-TV, Seattle, "Why the Orcas of Puget Sound Are Dying" (reported by Steve Raible)
- KOLD-TV, Tucson, and Chip Yost, "Exploding Patrol Cars?"
- NPR and Peter Overby for campaign finance coverage
- Palfreman Film Group and WGBH-TV, Boston, "Frontline/Nova: Harvest of Fear" on PBS
- WABC-TV, New York, Jim Hoffer and Daniela Royes, "Caught Off Guard"
- WNYC Radio, New York, and Beth Fertig "The Edison Schools Vote"

=== 2003 ===
- Gold Baton: WGBH-TV, Boston, "Frontline," for a series of seven programs on PBS ("Hunting bin Laden,"; "Target America,"; "Looking for Answers,"; "Trail of a Terrorist,"; "Gunning for Saddam,"; "Saudi Time Bomb,"; "Inside the Terror Network,") about the origin and impact of terrorism by Islamic militants
- ABC News Television and Radio for coverage of 9/11 (citing the work of Ann Compton and John Miller) and "Answering Children's Questions" (citing the work of Peter Jennings)
- ABC News, "Nightline: Heart of Darkness" (Martin Seemungal, correspondent)
- CNN en Español and Jorge Gestoso, "La Doble Desaparecida"
- Court TV and Lumiere Productions, "Ghosts of Attica"
- HBO, "In Memorium: New York City, 9/11/01"
- KPBS-TV, San Diego, and Lee Harvey, "Culture of Hate: Who are We?"
- NBC News and Martin Fletcher, for coverage of the Israeli-Palestinian conflict
- NPR, for coverage of 9/11 and the war in Afghanistan
- POV, Tasha Oldman and Small Town Productions, "The Smith Family" on PBS
- WBUR-FM, Boston, "Surviving Torture: Inside Out" (Michael Goldfarb, correspondent)
- WCVB-TV, Boston, "Chronicle: Beyond the Big Dig"
- WFAA-TV, Dallas, Brett Ship and Mark Smith, "Fake Drugs, Real Lives"
- WGBH-TV, Boston, Steeplechase Films and Sierra Club Productions, "American Experience: Ansel Adams: A Documentary Film" on PBS

=== 2004 ===
- ABC News, "Nightline: Tip of the Spear" (Ted Koppel, correspondent)
- CBS News, David Martin and Mary Walsh, for coverage of national security
- HBO and Maysles Films Inc., "LaLee's Kin: The Legacy of Cotton"
- KBCI-TV, Boise, Idaho, "Shake-Up at City Hall"
- KHOU-TV, Houston, "Evidence of Errors"
- KMGH-TV, Denver, Colorado, "Honor and Betrayal: Scandal at the Academy" (John Ferrugia, reporter)
- NPR, for coverage of the war in Iraq (citing the work of John Burnett, Anne Garrels, Steve Inskeep, Christopher Joyce, Mike Shuster, Ivan Watson and Eric Westervelt)
- WESH-TV, Orlando, for coverage of the Columbia Space Shuttle disaster
- WGBH-TV, Boston, "Frontline: A Dangerous Business" on PBS (Lowell Bergman and David Barstow, correspondents)
- WGBH-TV, Boston, "Frontline": Failure to Protect; "The Taking of Logan Marr"; "The Caseworker Files"; and "A National Dialogue" (moderated by John Hockenberry) on PBS
- WGBH-TV, Boston, "Frontline: Faith and Doubt at Ground Zero" on PBS (directed by Helen Whitney)
- Whitney Dow and Marco Williams, "POV: Two Towns of Jasper" on PBS (about the murder of James Byrd Jr.)
- WTVF-TV, Nashville, Tennessee, "Friends in High Places"

=== 2005 ===
- ABC NEWS and PJ PRODUCTIONS for Jesus and Paul: The Word and the Witness (aired on Peter Jennings Reporting)
- PBS FRONTLINE and WGBH-TV for Ghosts of Rwanda on PBS (produced by Greg Barker)
- ABC NEWS and PRIMETIME THURSDAY for The Nuclear Smuggling Project (Brian Ross, correspondent)
- DAVID APPLEBY and THE UNIVERSITY OF MEMPHIS for Hoxie: The First Stand on PBS
- FRONTLINE and WGBH-TV for Truth, War and Consequences on PBS (produced by Martin Smith and Marcela Gaviria)
- MSNBC and NATIONAL GEOGRAPHIC ULTIMATE EXPLORER for Liberia: American Dream? (reported by Michael Davie)
- HBO/CINEMAX REEL LIFE, Victoria Bruce & Karin Hayes for The Kidnapping of Ingrid Betancourt
- LOUISIANA PUBLIC BROADCASTING for Louisiana: Currents of Change (directed by Tika Laudun)
- NBC NEWS and DATELINE for A Pattern of Suspicion (John Larson, correspondent)
- NPR and RADIO DIARIES for Mandela: An Audio History (produced by Sue Johnson and Joe Richman)
- WFAA-TV, DALLAS for State of Denial (reported by Brett Shipp)
- WBAP-AM, DALLAS for JFK 40
- WCNC-TV, CHARLOTTE for Medicaid Dental Centers Investigation (reported by Stuart Watson)

The duPont Jury also announced four finalists for their exemplary broadcast journalism:

- Independent Television Service (ITVS) and Tracy Droz Tragos for "Be Good, Smile Pretty" on PBS (aired on Independent Lens)
- MarketPlace and American Public Media for "Spoils of War" on public radio stations
- NOVA, WGBH-TV and Canadian Broadcasting Corp. for "Crash of Flight 111"
- WISH-TV, Indianapolis, for "Will Your Vote Count?"

=== 2006 ===
- ABC NEWS for Live Coverage of the Death of Pope John Paul II and the Election of Pope Benedict XVI
- CNBC for The Age of Wal-Mart: Inside America's Most Powerful Company (David Faber, reporter)
- CNN for Coverage of the Tsunami Disaster in South Asia
- FRONTLINE and WGBH, BOSTON, for Al Qaeda's New Front on PBS (Lowell Bergman, correspondent)
- FRONTLINE, WGBH, BOSTON, and The New York Times for "The Secret History of the Credit Card" on PBS (Lowell Bergman, correspondent)
- HBO for Real Sports with Bryant Gumbel: The Sport of Sheikhs (Bernard Goldberg, correspondent)
- North Carolina Public Radio-WUNC, Chapel Hill, for North Carolina Voices: Understanding Poverty
- PRI, WGBH, BOSTON, and BBC WORLD SERVICE for "The World: The Global Race for Stem Cell Therapies"
- The Kitchen Sisters, Jay Allison and NPR for Hidden Kitchens
- THE SUNDANCE CHANNEL, Denis Poncet, Jean-Xavier de Lestrade and Allyson Luchak for "The Staircase"
- WFTS-TV, TAMPA, for Crosstown Expressway Investigation (Mike Mason, reporter)
- WJW, CLEVELAND, for School Bus Bloat (Tom Merriman, reporter)
- WPMI-TV, MOBILE, for For Lauren's Sake (Bruce Mildwurf, reporter)

=== 2007 ===
- American Masters and WNET, New York, for Bob Dylan: No Direction Home on PBS
- Brook Lapping Productions, London, for Israel and the Arabs: Elusive Peace on PBS
- WGBH's Cape and Islands NPR Stations for Two Cape Cods: Hidden Poverty on the Cape and Islands (Sean Corcoran, reporter)
- Investigation Discovery, Canadian Broadcasting Corporation and The New York Times for Nuclear Jihad: Can Terrorists Get the Bomb? (Julian Sher, director; William Broad and David E. Sanger, reporters)
- Frontline and WGBH, Boston, for The Age of AIDS on PBS (Renata Simone, reporter; Greg Barker and William Cran, directors)
- HBO, Jon Alpert and Matthew O'Neill for Baghdad ER
- ITVS, Lisa Sleeth and Jim Butterworth for Independent Lens: Seoul Train on PBS
- NBC Nightly News and Dateline for Coverage of Hurricane Katrina
- KCET, Los Angeles, KPBS, San Diego, KQED, San Francisco, KVIE, Sacramento, for California Connected: War Stories from Ward 7-D (Lisa McRee, reporter)
- NPR for Coverage of Iraq
- WBAL-TV, Baltimore, for Dirty Secret (John Sherman, reporter)
- WLOX-TV, Biloxi, for Coverage of Hurricane Katrina
- WRAL-TV, Raleigh, for Focal Point: Paper Thin Promise and Standards of Living (Lynda Loveland and David Crabtree, anchors)
- WWL-TV, New Orleans, for Coverage of Hurricane Katrina

=== 2008 ===
The thirteen awards for 2008 were announced on December 17, 2007, and presented on January 16, 2008.

- CBS News for 60 Minutes: The Mother of All Heists (Steve Kroft, correspondent)
- Chicago Public Radio, Alix Spiegel & PRI for This American Life: Which One of These Is Not Like the Others?
- PBS, Florentine Films/Hott Productions & WETA-TV, Washington, DC, for Through Deaf Eyes
- HBO, Ricki Stern & Annie Sundberg for The Trials of Darryl Hunt
- KHOU-TV, Houston, for Rules of the Game (Jeremy Rogalski, reporter)
- KMOV-TV, St. Louis, for Left Behind: The Failure of East St. Louis Schools (Craig Cheatham, reporter)
- KNOE-TV, Monroe, Louisiana, for Names, Ranks and Serial Plunder: The National Guard and Katrina (Taylor Henry, reporter)
- MSNBC & Richard Engel for War Zone Diary
- NBC News for Dateline: The Education of Ms. Groves (Hoda Kotb, correspondent)
- NPR & Daniel Zwerdling for Mental Anguish and the Military
- PBS, Paladin Invision, London, & WETA-TV, Washington, DC, for Jihad: The Men and Ideas Behind Al Qaeda (William Cran, director) (aired on America at a Crossroads)
- WBBM-TV, for Fly At Your Own Risk (Dave Savini, reporter)
- WFAA-TV, for Television Justice (Byron Harris, reporter)

=== 2009 ===
Television: Golden Baton Winner

- WFAA-TV in Dallas for "Money for Nothing", "A Passing Offense", "The Buried and the Dead" (Byron Harris, Brett Shipp, reporters)

Television & Radio, Silver Baton Winners

- ABC News / Nightline for "The Other War: Afghanistan" (Sebastian Junger, reporter; Tim Hetherington, photographer; Brian Ross, correspondent)
- California Newsreel, San Francisco & Vital Pictures for "Unnatural Causes: Is Inequality Making Us Sick?"
- Chicago Public Radio, PRI, NPR, Alex Blumberg & Adam Davidson for "This American Life: The Giant Pool of Money"
- CNN for "God's Warriors" (Christiane Amanpour, correspondent) (aired on CNN Presents)
- Current TV & Christof Putzel for "From Russia with Hate"
- HBO, Thomas Lennon & Ruby Yang for Cinemax's Reel Life: The Blood of Yingzhou District
- NPR, All Things Considered, Melissa Block, & Robert Siegel for "Coverage of the Chengdu Earthquake" (Louisa Lim, Anthony Kuhn, correspondents)
- NPR, All Things Considered, for "Sexual Abuse of Native American Women" (Laura Sullivan, correspondent)
- Oregon Public Broadcasting for "The Silent Invasion" (Ed Jahn, producer)
- Safari Media, ITVS, PBS for "Independent Lens, Abduction: The Megumi Yokota Story" (Patty Kim and Chris Sheridan, directors)
- WJLA-TV, Washington, DC for "Drilling for Dollars: Children's Dentistry Investigation" (Roberta Baskin, correspondent)
- WTVT-TV, Tampa for "Small Town Justice" (Doug Smith, reporter)

=== 2010 ===
Television, Radio, and Web: Silver Baton Winners

- American RadioWorks, Michael Montgomery & Joshua E. S. Phillips for "What Killed Sergeant Gray"
- CBS News & Katie Couric for "The Sarah Palin Interviews"
- CBS News for "CBS Reports: Children of the Recession" (Katie Couric, reporter)
- HBO & Edet Belzberg for "The Recruiter"
- KHOU-TV, Houston & Mark Greenblatt for "Under Fire: Discrimination and Corruption in the Texas National Guard"
- KMGH-TV, Denver & Tony Kovaleski for "33 Minutes to 34 Right"
- MediaStorm & Jonathan Torgovnik for "Intended Consequences"
- NPR, Michele Norris & Steve Inskeep for "The York Project: Race and the 2008 Vote"
- POV, Elizabeth Farnsworth & Patricio Lanfranco for "The Judge and the General," on PBS
- WCAX-TV, Burlington & Kristin Carlson for "Foreigners on the Farm"
- WGBH, Boston, FRONTLINE/World, Sharmeen Obaid-Chinoy & Dan Edge for "PAKISTAN: Children of the Taliban," on PBS
- WSVN-TV, Miami, Carmel Cafiero & Anthony Pineda for "Pill Mills"
- WTVF-TV, Nashville & Phil Williams for "General Sessions Court"
- WWL-TV, New Orleans for "NOAH Housing Program Investigation" (Lee Zurik, reporter)

=== 2011 ===
Television, Radio, and Digital: Silver Baton Winners

- ABC News, for 20/20, "Brian Ross Investigates: The Coach's Secret"
- BBC America, for "BBC World News America: Haiti's Earthquake" (Matt Frei, Matthew Price, correspondents)
- CBS News, for "60 Minutes: "The Blowout" (Scott Pelley, correspondent)
- KCET, Los Angeles for "Up In Smoke", "Protected or Neglected?", "Hung Out to Dry?" (John Larson, Steve Lopez, Judy Muller, Vince Gonzales, reporters; Val Zavala, anchor)
- KING-TV, Seattle & Susannah Frame for "Waste on the Water"
- 9News/KUSA-TV, Denver, 9News at 10 for "Keys to the Castle" (Jace Larson, reporter)
- NPR & Laura Sullivan for "Bonding for Profit"
- POV & Geoffrey Smith, "The English Surgeon" on PBS
- The Las Vegas Sun, "Bottoming Out: Gambling Addiction in Las Vegas" (Scott Den Herder, Liz Benston, Patrick Coolican, reporters)
- West Virginia Public Broadcasting, Trey Kay & Deborah George for "The Great Textbook War"
- WGBH, Frontline & Najibullah Quraishi for "Behind Taliban Lines"
- WKOW-TV, Madison & Dan Cassuto for "Who's Protecting You?"
- WTHR-TV, Indianapolis & Bob Segall for "Reality Check: Where are the Jobs?"

=== 2012 ===
- Al Jazeera English, Fault Lines, "Haiti - Six Months On" (Sebastian Walker, correspondent)
- CBS News: 60 Minutes, "A Relentless Enemy" (Lara Logan, correspondent)
- Danfung Dennis, Impact Partners, Roast Beef Productions, Sabotage Films, Thought Engine and Channel 4 BritDoc Foundation, Hell and Back Again
- Detroit Public Television, "Beyond the Light Switch" (directed by Ed Moore
- HBO & Blowback Productions, "Triangle: Remembering the Fire" (directed by Daphne Pinkerson)
- HBO, "Real Sports with Bryant Gumbel: Head Games" (Bernard Goldberg, correspondent)
- MediaStorm & Walter Astrada, "Undesired" for the Alexia Foundation
- NBC News & Richard Engel, Coverage of the Arab Spring
- The New York Times, "A Year at War" (James Dao, reporter) and "Surviving Haiti's Earthquake: Children" (Brent Renaud & Craig Renaud, reporters)
- WFAA-TV, Dallas & Byron Harris, "Bitter Lessons"
- WGBH-TV, Boston, "NOVA: Japan's Killer Quake" (Richard Burke-Ward, Robert Strange, producers)
- WNYC & Ailsa Chang, "Alleged Illegal Searches by the NYPD"
- WSB-TV, Atlanta & Jodie Fleischer, "Stealing Houses"
- WTVF-TV, Nashville & Phil Williams, "Policing for Profit"

=== 2013 ===
- Alison Klayman, Never Sorry LLC, United Expression Media, Sundance Selects, MUSE Film and Television, "Ai Weiwei: Never Sorry" (aired on Independent Lens)
- CBS News and Clarissa Ward, for "CBS Evening News with Scott Pelley: Inside Syria"
- Current TV, Christof Putzel and the Renaud Brothers, "Vangard: Arming the Mexican Cartel"
- KCET, Southern California for "SoCal Connected: Courting Disaster" (Jennifer London, correspondent; Karen Foshay, producer)
- KLAS-TV, Las Vegas for "Desert Underwater" (George Knapp and Colleen McCarty, reporters)
- Lee Hirsch, The Weinstein Company, Where We Live Films, BeCause Foundation, The Einhorn Family Charitable Trust, The Fledgling Fund, National Center for Learning Disabilities, and the Waitt Institute for Violence Prevention, for Bully (aired on Independent Lens)
- NPR, Deborah Amos, and Kelly McEvers for Coverage of Syria
- StoryCorps, NPR, and POV, for "StoryCorps 9/11"
- USA Today, for "Ghost Factories"
- WGBH, Kartemquin Films, Steve James and Alex Kotlowitz, for "FRONTLINE: The Interrupters
- WGBH, Clover Films and Najibullah Quraishi, for "FRONTLINE: Opium Brides"
- WITF, WHYY and NPR, for "StateImpact Pennsylvania"
- WVUE-TV, New Orleans, and Lee Zurik for "Dirty Deeds", "Hiding Behind the Badge"
- WXYZ-TV, Detroit, for "Wayne County Confidential"

=== 2014 ===
- American Documentary – POV, Gail Dolgin & Robin Fryday, "The Barber of Birmingham: Foot Soldier of the Civil Rights Movement", on PBS
- CBS News, Newtown Tragedy Coverage
- Center for Investigative Reporting, "Broken Shield"
- ESPN, Outside the Lines: Youth Football Concerns (Tom Farrey, Paula Lavigne, reporters)
- KMGH-TV, Denver & Keli Rabon, Colorado Rape Victims: Evidence Ignored, Justice Denied
- KSHB 41 Action News, Kansas City, "Tragedy on the Plaza" (Keith King, Ryan Kath, & Melissa Yeager, reporters)
- NBC News, "Devastation in Oklahoma"
- Scott Thurman & Silver Lining Film Group, Magic Hour Entertainment, Naked Edge Films, "The Revisionaries" on Independent Lens
- U. C. Berkeley IRP, CIR, FRONTLINE & UNIVISION, "Rape in the Fields/Violación de un Sueño" (Andrés Cediel and Lowell Bergman, producers)
- WBEZ Chicago, This American Life: "Harper High School Parts 1 and 2" (Ben Calhoun, Alex Kotlowitz, Linda Lutton, reporters)
- WBZ-TV, Boston, Boston Marathon Bombings Coverage
- WFAA-TV, Dallas & Byron Harris, "Denticaid: Medicaid Dental Abuse in Texas"
- WVUE-TV, New Orleans & Lee Zurik, "Body of Evidence"
- WYPR, Baltimore, "The Lines Between Us" (Sheilah Kast & Tom Hall, hosts)

=== 2015 ===
- CNN, WEED: Dr. Sanjay Gupta Reports
- KPNX 12 News, Phoenix & Wendy Halloran, Raked Over the Coals
- MPR News, Betrayed by Silence (reported by Madeleine Baran)
- Netflix, Virunga
- NPR & Joseph Shapiro, Guilty and Charged
- PBS, The African Americans: Many Rivers to Cross with Henry Louis Gates Jr.
- Particle Fever
- Planet Money & NPR Visuals, Planet Money Makes a T-shirt
- The Seattle Times, Sea Change: The Pacific's Perilous Turn
- WFTS-TV, Tampa Bay, Incapacitated: Florida's Guardianship Program
- WGBH-TV, Boston, FRONTLINE: Syria's Second Front
- WGBH-TV, Boston, FRONTLINE: United States of Secrets
- WLTX-TV, Columbia, DDS: When the System Fails
- WTSP 10 News, Tampa Bay, Short Yellows and the Red Light Fight

=== 2016 ===
- ABC News, Bruce Jenner: The Interview (aired on 20/20)
- Al Jazeera America & Kartemquin Films, Hard Earned
- CBS News 60 Minutes, A Crime Against Humanity (Scott Pelley, reporter)
- Cronkite News & Arizona PBS, Hooked: Tracking Heroin's Hold on Arizona
- FRONTLINE PBS, Ebola Outbreak (produced by Wael Dabbous) & Outbreak (Dan Edge & Sasha Joelle Achilli, producers)
- FRONTLINE PBS, Growing Up Trans (Miri Navasky, Karen O'Connor, producers)
- HBO, Going Clear: Scientology and the Prison of Belief
- HBO Real Sports with Bryant Gumbel, The Price of Glory (David Scott, correspondent)
- KMO-TV & Craig Cheatham, The Injustice System: Cops, Courts and Greedy Politicians
- Milwaukee Journal Sentinel, A Watershed Moment: Great Lakes at a Crossroads (Dan Egan, reporter)
- VICE News, Selfie Soldiers: Russia's Army Checks into Ukraine (Simon Ostrovsky, correspondent)
- WBAL-TV & Jayne Miller, Freddie Gray Investigation
- WBEZ & This American Life, Serial: Season One
- WETA-TV, Cancer: The Emperor of All Maladies
- WNYC, NYPD Bruised
- WRAL-TV, Journey Alone
- Specialist Finalist Citation: KCBS Radio, Unholy Water

=== 2017 ===
- CBS News, Nowhere to Go, Europe's Migrant Crisis (Charlie D'Agata, Mark Phillips, & Holly Williams, correspondents)
- Dateline NBC, The Cosby Accusers Speak (Kate Snow, correspondent)
- ESPN Films and Laylow Films, O.J.: Made in America
- Fusion, The Naked Truth: Death by Fentanyl (Mariana van Zeller, correspondent)
- Frontline - PBS, Escaping ISIS (produced by Edward Watts and Evan Williams) and Children of Syria (produced by Marcel Mettelsiefen)
- The GroundTruth Project, Foreverstan: The Girls' School (directed by Beth Murphy) and Razia's Way (reported by Beth Murphy)
- HBO Documentary Films and SOC Films, A Girl in the River: The Price of Forgiveness
- KXAN, Racial Profiling Whitewash
- Michigan Radio, Not Safe to Drink
- NBC Connecticut, Crumbling Foundations
- NOVA and WGBH-TV, Mystery Beneath the Ice (directed by David Sington)
- NPR & Daniel Zwerdling | Colorado Public Radio & Michael de Yoanna, Missed Treatment
- WTHR-TV, Charity Caught on Camera
- WXIA-TV, Alive Atlanta, Dying for Help: Fixing the Nation's Emergency Response System

=== 2018 ===
- ABC15 Arizona, Cash for Compliance
- ABC News, Lincoln Square Productions, Let It Fall: Los Angeles 1982-1992
- American Documentary and WORLD Channel - PBS, AMERICA REFRAMED: Class of '27 (directed by James Rutenbeck)
- CBS News, 60 Minutes: The New Cold War
- CBS Evening News, The Road to Aleppo
- Frontline - PBS, Exodus (produced by James Bluemel
- HBO Real Sports With Bryant Gumbel, The Lords of the Rings (David Scott, correspondent)
- KARE 11, Investigative Reporting
- KHOU-TV, Transparency
- National Geographic Documentary Films and Junger Quested Films, Hell on Earth: The Fall of Syria and the Rise of ISIS (directed by Sebastian Junger and Nick Quested)
- NBC Bay Area (KNTV), Arrested at School
- Netflix, Forward Movement, Kandoo Films, 13th
- The New York Times, The Daily
- Reveal from The Center for Investigative Reporting and PRX, and Coda Story, Russia's New Scapegoats (reported by Natalia Antelava)
- This American Life, Episode 600: Will I Know Anyone At This Party? Act One: Party in the USA (reported by Zoe Chace)
- WITI-TV, Men on the Margin

=== 2019 ===
- Gold Baton: Frontline for:
  - Bitter Rivals: Iran and Saudi Arabia (produced by Martin Smith and Linda Hirsch)
  - Life on Parole (produced by Matthew O'Neill
  - Living with Murder (a podcast produced by Samantha Broun, Jay Allison, and Sophie McKibben)
  - Mosul (produced by Olivier Sarbil, James Jones, and Dan Edge)
  - Myanmar's Killing Fields (produced by Evan Williams and Dan Edge)
  - Putin's Revenge (produced by Michael Kirk, Mike Wiser, Philip Bennett, Jim Gilmore, and David E. Hoffman)
  - The Gang Crackdown (produced by Marcela Gaviria)
  - The Last Generation (an interactive documentary produced by Michelle Mizner and Katie Worth)
- Florentine Films & WETA, The Vietnam War
- Reveal, PRX, PBS NewsHour, Associated Press, Kept Out (reported by a team including Aaron Glantz and Emmanuel Martinez)
- 60 Minutes, The Washington Post, The Whistleblower & Too Big to Prosecute (reported by Bill Whitaker, Scott Higham, and Lenny Bernstein)
- WTSP, The Tampa Bay Times, Zombie Campaigns (reported by Noah Pransky)
- WNYC, ProPublica, Trump Inc.
- CNN Films, RBG
- NBC Bay Area, Drivers Under Siege (reported by Vicky Nguyen)
- HBO, Mariska Hargitay, Trish Adlesic, Geeta Gandbhir, I Am Evidence
- RYOT, Alexandria Bombach, Nadia Murad, On Her Shoulders
- This American Life, Our Town (by Miki Meek and Ira Glass)
- EPIX, Gidalya Pictures & Blumhouse, This Is Home (directed by Alexandra Shiva)
- WNYC, Caught: The Lives of Juvenile Justice
- CBS Miami WFOR, The Everglades: Where Politics, Money and Race Collide (reported by Jim DeFede)
- Rocky Mountain PBS' Insight with John Ferrugia, Imminent Danger

=== 2020 ===
- APM Reports, In the Dark, Season Two: Supreme Court Coverage
- CBS News, 60 Minutes, On the Border
- CNN, The Disappearance of Jamal Khashoggi
- Frontline, ProPublica, PBS, Documenting Hate
- Frontline, The Facebook Dilemma
- KARE 11, Love Them First: Lessons from Lucy Laney Elementary & On the Veterans Best (A.J. Lagoe, reporter)
- Netflix, The Bleeding Edge
- PBS Newshour, Inside Yemen
- POV & American Documentary, Inc., The Apology
- POV, Dark Money
- Michigan Radio & NPR, Believed
- MSNBC, Bag Man
- WKBW-TV, Fall From Grace: When Priests Prey and Bishops Betray
- WETA, McGee Media & Inkwell Films, Reconstruction: After The Civil War
- WSOC-TV, Something Suspicious in District 9

=== 2021 ===
- American Experience, PBS, Chasing the Moon
- Frontline, PBS, For Sama
- KING-TV, Bob's Choice
- KSTP-TV, George Floyd coverage
- NBCNews.com, A Different Kind of Force—Policing Mental Illness
- Netflix, Crip Camp
- NOVA, PBS, Decoding COVID-19
- Radiotopia, Public Radio Exchange, Ear Hustle
- The Washington Post, Lafayette Reconstruction
- Upper East Films and Independent Lens, PBS, Bedlam
- Vice, Showtime, India Burning
- WFAA, Verify Road Trip: Climate Truth
- WNBC, The Epicenter of the Coronavirus Pandemic
- OSM Audio, Radiolab, WNYC Studios, The Flag and the Fury
- Radiolab, WNYC Studios, The Other Latif

=== 2022 ===
- 99% Invisible, Stitcher Media, and PRX, According to Need (hosted by Katie Mingle)
- The History Channel, WNYC Studios, and KOSU, Blindspot: Tulsa Burning (hosted by KalaLea)
- KARE, KARE11 Investigates: Cruel & Unusual (A.J. Lagoe, reporter)
- The New York Times, Day of Rage: How Trump Supporters Took the U.S. Capitol
- KXTV, Fire - Power - Money: Holding PG&E Accountable (Brandon Rittiman, reporter)
- KNXV-TV, Full Disclosure and Politically Charged (Dave Biscobing, reporter)
- HBO Documentary Films, In the Same Breath
- CBS News, Military Sexual Assault: Norah O'Donnell Investigates
- KNTV, The Moms of Magnolia Street (Melissa Colorado, Cheryl Hurd, Kris Sanchez, Sonja Shin, Thom Jensen, and Bigad Shaban, reporters)
- Amazon Studios, Participant Media, and Storyville Films, My Name is Pauli Murray
- PBS, Independent Lens, and TOPIC, Philly D.A.
- POV, American Documentary, and LBx Africa, Softie
- Apple and Jigsaw Productions, The Line (hosted by Dan Taberski)
- Vice News, The Shockwave (Lama Al-Arian, correspondent)
- POV, American Documentary, and Third Shift Media, Through the Night
- NPR, Planet Money, and Frontline, Waste Land (Laura Sullivan, correspondent)

=== 2023 ===
- CBS News, 60 Minutes: National Security in the Information Age ( "SolarWinds," "Deepfakes," "The Grid," "Shields Up"; Bill Whitaker, correspondent)
- PBS, GBH, NOVA, Arctic Sinkholes (Nick Tanner and Brice Habeger, producers/directors)
- This American Life, Talking While Black (Emanuele Berry host; Berry and Chana Joffe-Walt, reporters)
- PBS NewsHour & Jane Ferguson, Coverage of the Fall of Afghanistan and the War in Ukraine (Ferguson, Nick Schifrin, Simon Ostrovsky, Ryan Chilcote, Willem Marx, Jack Hewson, and Malcolm Brabant, correspondents)
- Audible, Finding Tamika (Erika Alexander, host)
- KARE 11 Minneapolis/St. Paul & A.J. Lagoe, KARE 11 Investigates - The GAP: Failure to Treat, Failure to Protect
- Warner Bros. Discovery, HBO, The Janes
- WXIA-TV Atlanta & Rebecca Lindstrom, #Keeping
- ABC News Studios | Hulu, Leave No Trace: A Hidden History of The Boy Scouts (Irene Taylor, director)
- WBRZ-TV Baton Rouge & Chris Nakamoto, MURDER - LIES - HIDDEN EVIDENCE: Holding Louisiana State Police accountable
- CNN Films & HBO Max, Navalny
- WTVF-TV Nashville & Phil Williams, NewsChannel 5 Investigates: Revealed
- KXAS-TV NBC Dallas/Ft. Worth & Scott Friedman, Paper Tag Nation
- The Washington Post: Post Reports, A Post-Roe America: Continuing Coverage of Abortion (Caroline Kitchener, Bob Barnes, Ann Marimow, Rennie Svirnovskiy, Ariel Plotnick, Julie Depenbrock, and Jordan-Marie Smith, reporters)
- Gimlet Media | Spotify, Stolen: Surviving St. Michael's
- CNN Worldwide, Ukraine Coverage (Matthew Chance, Clarissa Ward, Alex Marquardt, Nick Paton Walsh, Michael Holmes, Ben Wedeman, Phil Black, Nima Elbagir, Scott McLean, Sam Kiley, Ivan Watson, Melissa Bell, Atika Shubert, Salma Abdelaziz, Isa Soares, Suzanne Malveaux, Jason Carroll, Ed Lavandera, Gustavo Valdes, and Rafael Romo, correspondents)

=== 2024 ===
Sources:

- The Associated Press, PBS Frontline, 20 Days in Mariupol
- Tony Plohetski & KVUE TV, The Austin American-Statesman, Accountability After Uvalde
- PBS Frontline, Afghanistan Undercover (Ramita Navai, correspondent)
- ABC News Studios, Onyx Collective, Hulu, Aftershock
- Scott Friedman & KXAS-TV, Against All Enemies
- Ideal Partners, Independent Lens, Beyond Utopia
- KUSA 9NEWS Denver, BURNED (Katie Eastman, Nelson Garcia, Angeline McCall, Steve Staeger, Kevin Vaughan, and Marshall Zelinger, reporters)
- The New York Times, Caught on Camera, Traced by Phone: The Russian Military Unit That Killed Dozens in Bucha (Masha Froliak, Yousur Al-Hlou, Christoph Koettl, and Haley Willis, producers)
- Crooked Media, Mother Country Radicals (Zayd Ayers Dohrn, producer)
- Brook Lapping, Les Films D’ici, Putin vs the West (Lotte Murphy-Johnson and Max Stern, directors)
- APM Reports, Sold a Story: How Teaching Kids to Read Went So Wrong (Emily Hanford, reporter)
- New Hampshire Public Radio, The 13th Step (Lauren Chooljian, reporter)
- Andy Pierrotti & WANF-TV, InvestigateTV, The Sixth
- Florentine Films/WETA, The U.S. and the Holocaust
- ABC News, Environmental Reporting: The Power of Water (Chris Connelly, Jaclyn Lee, Steve Osunsami, John Quinones, Rachel Scott, Mireya Villareal, Kayna Whitworth, correspondents) & Trashed (Matt Gutman, correspondent)

=== 2025 ===
- WTVF-TV, NewsChannel 5 Nashville & Phil Williams, Hate Comes to Main Street
- KFOR, Oklahoma City & Ali Meyer, The Wrong Man
- HBO | Max, Little Room Films & The Boston Globe (Docuseries), The Boston Globe & HBO (Podcast), Murder in Boston
- Reveal, The Investigative Reporting Program at UC Berkeley & PRX, We Regret to Inform You (reported by Brian Howey)
- Scripps News, Maine Shooting: Missed Warnings (Lori Jane Gliha, investigative correspondent)
- ABC10 KXTV, Sacramento & Andie Judson, The Wild West of Education
- ProPublica & On the Media | WNYC Studios, We Don’t Talk About Leonard (reported by Andrea Bernstein, Andy Kroll, and Ilya Marritz)
- VICE News, Battleground Texas (directed by Nicole Bozorgmir)
- Reveal, The Center for Public Integrity, Mother Jones & PRX, 40 Acres and a Lie (reported by Alexia Fernández Campbell, April Simpson, Pratheek Rebala, Nadia Hamdan, and Roy Hurst)
- National Geographic Documentary Films, The Kennedy/Marshall Company, Alegria Films & Cortés Filmworks, The Space Race (directed by Lisa Cortés)
- MTV Documentary Films, Take Flight Films & Firelight Films, Birthing A Nation: The Resistance of Mary Gaffney (directed by Nazenet Habtezghi)
- Netflix & Lucernam Films, You Are Not Alone: Fighting the Wolfpack (directed by Robert Bahar and Almudena Carracedo)
- The Outlaw Ocean Project, China: The Superpower of Seafood (directed by Ian Urbina and Ben Blankenship)
- NPR, The War in Gaza Coverage (with reporting by Hadeel Al-Shalchi, Daniel Estrin, Kat Lonsdorf, Aya Batrawy, Jane Arraf, Ruth Sherlock, Becky Sullivan, Michele Kelemen, Jackie Northam, Scott Neuman, Carrie Kahn, Eyder Peralta, Rob Schmitz, Lauren Frayer, and Greg Myre)
- Songbird Studios & Imaginary Lane, Porcelain War

=== 2026 ===
- FRONTLINE FEATURES, The Associated Press, 2000 Meters to Andriivka
- PBS News Hour, The Fall of Assad (Leila Molana-Allen and Simona Foltyn, correspondents)
- Storyline, Homegrown
- WNYC | Gothamist, He was Officer 'Champagne' at Rikers. 24 Women Accuse Him of Sexual Assault in Jail. (Jessy Edwards and Samantha Max, reporters)
- WXYZ-TV, Detroit & Ross Jones, Shielded
- Bloomberg News | DCTV, Can't Look Away
- HBO Max, Surviving Ohio State
- WXIA-TV, Atlanta & Rebecca Lindstrom, Help That Harms
- Cox Media Group, KFF Health News, Social Security’s Secret (Justin Gray, John Bedell, Amy Hudak, Shannon Butler, Ben Becker, Ted Daniel, Jesse Jones, Madison Carter, Samantha Manning, David Hilzenrath, and Fred Clasen-Kelly, reporters)
- Reveal, PRX | Fault Lines, Al Jazeera English, Kids Under Fire in Gaza (Josh Rushing, senior correspondent; Najib Aminy, reporter)
- Business Insider, Satellite Images Track Four Gaza Businesses Upended by War (Reem Makhoul, producer)
- KXAS-TV NBC, Dallas/Ft. Worth & Scott Friedman, Driven to Death
- NBC News, Dealing the Dead (Liz Kreutz, correspondent)
- Paramount+, We Will Dance Again
- CBS News, 60 Minutes: The Prisoners (Cecilia Vega, correspondent)
- Special Citation: ABC News: The ABC News Presidential Debate: Race for the White House

== See also ==
- Academy Award for Best Documentary Feature
- The Peabody Awards
