= NewsHour Productions =

American non-profit organization and television production company

- Formation: September 14, 1981; 44 years ago (as MacNeil/Lehrer Productions); July 1, 2014; 12 years ago (current company)
- Type: Non-profit; Television Production; Film Production
- Tax ID no.: 53-0242992
- Legal status: 501(c)(3)
- Headquarters: Arlington, Virginia, U.S.
- Parent organization: WETA-TV
- Website: newshourproductions.org
- Formerly called: MacNeil/Lehrer-Gannett Productions (1981-1986); MacNeil/Lehrer Productions (1986-2014)

NewsHour Productions (formerly MacNeil/Lehrer-Gannett Productions and MacNeil/Lehrer Productions) is a television production company that was originally founded in 1981 by Robert MacNeil and Jim Lehrer, anchors of television's The MacNeil/Lehrer Report, now PBS News Hour. Its flagship program is PBS News Hour. It is a subsidiary of WETA-TV.

== History ==
=== MacNeil/Lehrer Productions ===
In 1981, Robert MacNeil and Jim Lehrer, who were anchors on PBS' The MacNeil/Lehrer Report, in partnership with the Gannett Company, formed MacNeil/Lehrer-Gannett Productions to produce television programming. Editorial control of the company was handled by MacNeil and Lehrer. Its intent was sell to commercial networks, syndication and cable.

With threats of losing its contract to PBS, MacNeil and Lehrer optend to extend the program on the condition that it was expanded to an hour. The resulting program, a renamed version of The MacNeil/Lehrer Report, called The MacNeil/Lehrer NewsHour, debuted in 1983 on PBS. It was a ratings success. In 1983, executive producer Al Vecchione became the company president of MacNeil/Lehrer-Gannett Productions.

It led MacNeil/Lehrer to expand beyond the flagship NewsHour, so it offered another program in 1985. It was called My Heart, Your Heart, and sponsored by AT&T, and another program, The Story of English, in conjunction with BBC, to be sponsored by General Foods. The company also made wraparounds for WNET-TV's program The Heart of the Dragon. In 1986, MacNeil and Lehrer split from Gannett after five years, so the company was renamed to MacNeil/Lehrer Productions.

In 1987, it inked a deal with Roger Mudd, where he was employed by the company to work for the flagship NewsHour, as well as other projects the company is producing. In 1988, it attempted to partner with Current Trends Productions to develop a weekly medical news program for first-run syndication, but this was never materialized. Also that year, the company produced an hour-long special on Thomas Edison, that was hosted by Roger Mudd, that aired on Disney Channel.

In 1989, MacNeil/Lehrer's expansion came when they made 12 one-hour documentaries on George Shultz, meant for PBS. Also that year, the company partnered with WETA-TV to produce the Learning in America specials on PBS, which was sponsored by Chrysler Corporation, and hosted by Roger Mudd. Later that year, the company hired Dr C. Everett Koop to host a series of hour-long specials produced by the company for NBC, which eventually aired in 1991.

In 1991, it was announced that MacNeil/Lehrer Productions is co-producing with NBC News, the coverage of the 1992 United States presidential election, which aired on PBS. In 1993, the company hired NBC News executive Garrick Utley to develop a news program, but it never materialized as Utley is about to move to ABC News.

In 1994, controlling interest of MacNeil/Lehrer Productions was sold to Liberty Media, who handled majority control, while MacNeil and Lehrer retained editorial control. Also that year, Robert MacNeil announced that he will retire from the flagship series NewsHour in 1995, leading the program to rename to The NewsHour with Jim Lehrer. In 1996, Al Vecchione had left the company.

MacNeil/Lehrer Productions twice planned to launch late-night newscasts in 1995 and 1999; in both instances, the proposed expansions of NewsHour—which, respectively, were to have involved production and newsgathering partnerships with Wall Street Journal Television and The New York Times—were canceled mid-development.

In 2005, Lester M. Crystal, a NewsHour producer, became the president of the company. In 2009, the flagship program adopted its current title, PBS NewsHour. Jim Lehrer stepped down from the NewsHour series in 2011. In 2014, shortly before it was sold, the company teamed up with website Al-Monitor to produce web videos on Middle East for websites.

=== NewsHour Productions ===
In 2013, MacNeil and Lehrer, along with Liberty Media, decided to sell the company, including its assets and staff to WETA-TV. The sale was finalized on July 1, 2014, and the company was renamed to NewsHour Productions, as it was transitioned into non-profit (a similar situation existed when Small World Enterprises, a for-profit organization turned into Family Communications in 1971) although MacNeil and Lehrer still owned the MacNeil/Lehrer Productions name.

In 2021, the company took over management of WETA-TV's news series Washington Week, and PBS NewsHour Weekend from WNET-TV, which was later renamed to PBS News Weekend. The company underwent staff reorganization in 2022.

== Filmography ==
- PBS News Hour (1981–present)
- My Heart, Your Heart (1985)
- The Heart of the Dragon (1985) (wraparounds)
- The Story of English (1986)
- The Wizard (1989)
- Learning in America (1990)
- C. Everett Koop, M.D. (1991)
- Bah, Humbug!: The Story of Charles Dickens' 'A Christmas Carol' (1994)
- Empire of the Bay (1998)
- Do You Speak American? (2005)
- By the People: Hard Times, Hard Choices (2010)
- The 40th Republican National Convention (2012)
- Debating Our Destiny: Presidential Debate Moments That Shaped History (2012)
- PBS the News (2013)
- Brief But Spectacular (2015)
- PBS NewsHour Special: Questions for President Obama (2016)
- Let Me Explain (2017)
- Race Matters: America After George Floyd (2021)
- Washington Week (2021–present)
- PBS News Weekend (2022–2026)
- Compass Points with PBS News (2026–present)
- Horizons with PBS News (2026–present)
