= Philip Bennett =

Philip Bennett, Phillip Bennett or similar may refer to:

- Philip Allen Bennett (1881–1942), American politician and Republican member of Congress
- Philip Bennett (Washington Post), American journalist and professor
- Phil Bennett (1948–2022), Welsh rugby union player
- Phil Bennett (racing driver) (born 1971), English racing driver
- Phil Bennett (American football) (born 1955), American collegiate football coach
- Phillip Bennett (1928–2023), Australian general and Governor of Tasmania
- Phillip R. Bennett (born 1948), British CEO

== See also ==
- Philip Bennet (disambiguation)
