= David Ropeik =

International consultant

David P. Ropeik (/ˈroʊpiːk/ ROH-peek) is an American international consultant, author, teacher, and speaker on risk perception and risk communication. He is also creator and director of Improving Media Coverage of Risk, a training program for journalists. He is a regular contributor to Big Think, Psychology Today, Cognoscenti, Medium and the Huffington Post. He has also written articles for other publications, including Nieman Reports.

== Background ==
He was born in Albany, NY and grew up in Trenton, NJ. Ropeik attended Northwestern University where he received a BSJ from the Medill School of Journalism in 1972 and a MSJ the following year.

Following graduate school, Ropeik began as a radio and television reporter for WTIC in Hartford, CT, which was soon sold to Post-Newsweek and became WFSB-TV. From 1978-2000, he worked at WCVB-TV in Boston as a reporter. Ropeik became a specialist in environmental news and was an early member of the Society for Environmental Journalists (SEJ). While at WCVB, Ropeik won two Alfred I. duPont-Columbia University Awards for excellence in television journalism. He also won a national Gabriel Award, National Headliner Awards (including a Best of Show additional honor), and seven regional Emmy Awards.

He was a Knight Science Journalism Fellow at MIT from 1994-5 and a National Tropical Botanical Garden Fellow in 1999.

== Career ==
In January 2000, Ropeik joined the Harvard School of Public Health, as Director of Communications for the Center for Risk Analysis and faculty member of the school's professional education course "The Risk Communication Challenge". He went on to become Instructor of risk communication at the school and co-director of the Risk Communication challenge course. He has taught courses on media coverage of risk issues at Harvard's Kennedy School of Government, the Nieman Fellowship Program, The Knight Science Journalism Fellowship at MIT, Boston University's Program in Science Journalism, Emerson College, the Council for the Advancement of Science Writers, the National Association of Science Writers, and the Society of Environmental Journalists.

With the then-director of the Center for Risk Analysis, George Gray, Ropeik co-authored the book "RISK, A Practical Guide for Deciding What’s Dangerous and What’s Safe in the World Around You", published by Houghton Mifflin in 2002.

In 2006, Ropeik left the School of Public Health, though he continued teaching in the Harvard Extension School He is now an independent consultant to government, business, trade associations, consumer groups, and educational institutions. He has written dozens of articles on risk perception. Ropeik is also author of the book, "How Risky Is It Really? Why Our Fears Don't Always Match the Facts," published in March 2010 by McGraw Hill.

He served as the risk communication member of the Congressionally mandated Veterans Affairs Board on Dose Reconstruction, which oversees the joint Department of Defense and Veterans Health Administration program to compensate veterans exposed to nuclear radiation. He was an Advisory Board member of the America Prepared campaign for terrorism and natural disaster preparedness, a joint effort of the Department of Homeland Security, the Advertising Council, the Alfred P. Sloan Foundation, and a consortium of businesses and individuals.

== Bibliography ==
=== Books ===
- Ropeik, David. How risky is it, really? Why our fears don't always match the facts.

=== Essays and reporting ===
- Ropeik, David (Feb–Mar 2014). "Risky business : psychology can teach us much about why many people fear GM foods". Special Feature. Food Wars. Cosmos. 55: 80–86.
