= Philip Bennet =

Philip Bennet may refer to:

- Philip Bennet (Bath MP) (1703–1761), Member of Parliament for Bath 1741–1747
- Philip Bennet (Suffolk MP) (1795–1866), British Conservative Party Member of Parliament for West Suffolk 1845–1859

== See also ==
- Philip Bennett (disambiguation)
