= Ofra Bikel =

Israeli filmmaker and television producer (1929–2024)

Ofra Bikel (née Ichilov; Hebrew: עפרה ביקל; September 12, 1929 – August 11, 2024) was an Israeli-American documentary filmmaker and television producer. For more than two decades she was a mainstay of the acclaimed PBS series Frontline producing over 25 award-winning documentaries, ranging from foreign affairs to critiques of the U.S. criminal justice system.

== Life and career ==
Bikel was born in Tel Aviv, Mandatory Palestine on September 12, 1929, to the Yechieli-Ichilov family. Her father was an electrical engineer and her mother was a special education teacher.

At age 19 she moved to Paris to study political science, graduating from the University of Paris and the Institut d'Études Politiques de Paris. She then moved to New York City. She was briefly married to actor and folk singer Theodore Bikel. She was a researcher for Time, Newsweek, and ABC Television. She moved to public television, producing films for the WGBH series The World and later for the long-running series Frontline.

In the mid-1970s, Bikel moved to her native Israel and produced more than 15 films. She returned to the U.S. in 1977. In the 1990s, she began reporting on miscarriage of justice cases, starting with her "Innocence Lost" trilogy of films about a case of alleged sexual abuse in Edenton, North Carolina. Her reporting is credited with freeing 13 wrongfully convicted people from prison, including one who had been on death row. Bikel eventually returned to Israel and spent the last decade of her life there.

Her documentary films intersperse long interviews with sharp, silent, moments.

Bikel died at her home in Tel Aviv on August 11, 2024, at the age of 94.

== Awards ==
- 2007 John Chancellor Award
- 2003 The Hillman Prize
- 2002 Alfred I. duPont–Columbia University Award
- 2002 Robert F. Kennedy Journalism Award
- 2002 Emmy Award Outstanding Investigative Journalism—Long Form
- 2000 NACDL Champion Of Justice Award
- 1994 Grand Prize at the Banff World Television Festival

== Works ==
- The Confessions, 2010
- Close to Home, 2009
- The Hugo Chávez Show, November 2008
- When Kids Get Life, 2007
- The Unexpected Candidate, March 2006
- The O.J. Verdict (2005)
- The Plea (2004)
- Requiem for Frank Lee Smith (2002)
- Saving Elian (2001)
- The Case for Innocence, January 2000
- Snitch (1999)
- The Search for Satan (1995)
- Divided Memories (1995)
- Clarence Thomas and Anita Hill: Public Hearing, Private Pain (1992)
- Poland—The Morning After (1990)
- American Games, Japanese Rules (1988)
- Israel: The Price of Victory (1987)
- The Russians Are Here (1983)
- Who Killed Sadat? (1982)
- Innocence Lost: The Plea (1997)
- Innocence Lost: The Verdict (1993)
- Innocence Lost (1991)
