= Elizabeth Arnold (reporter) =

American journalist (1959/1960–2026)

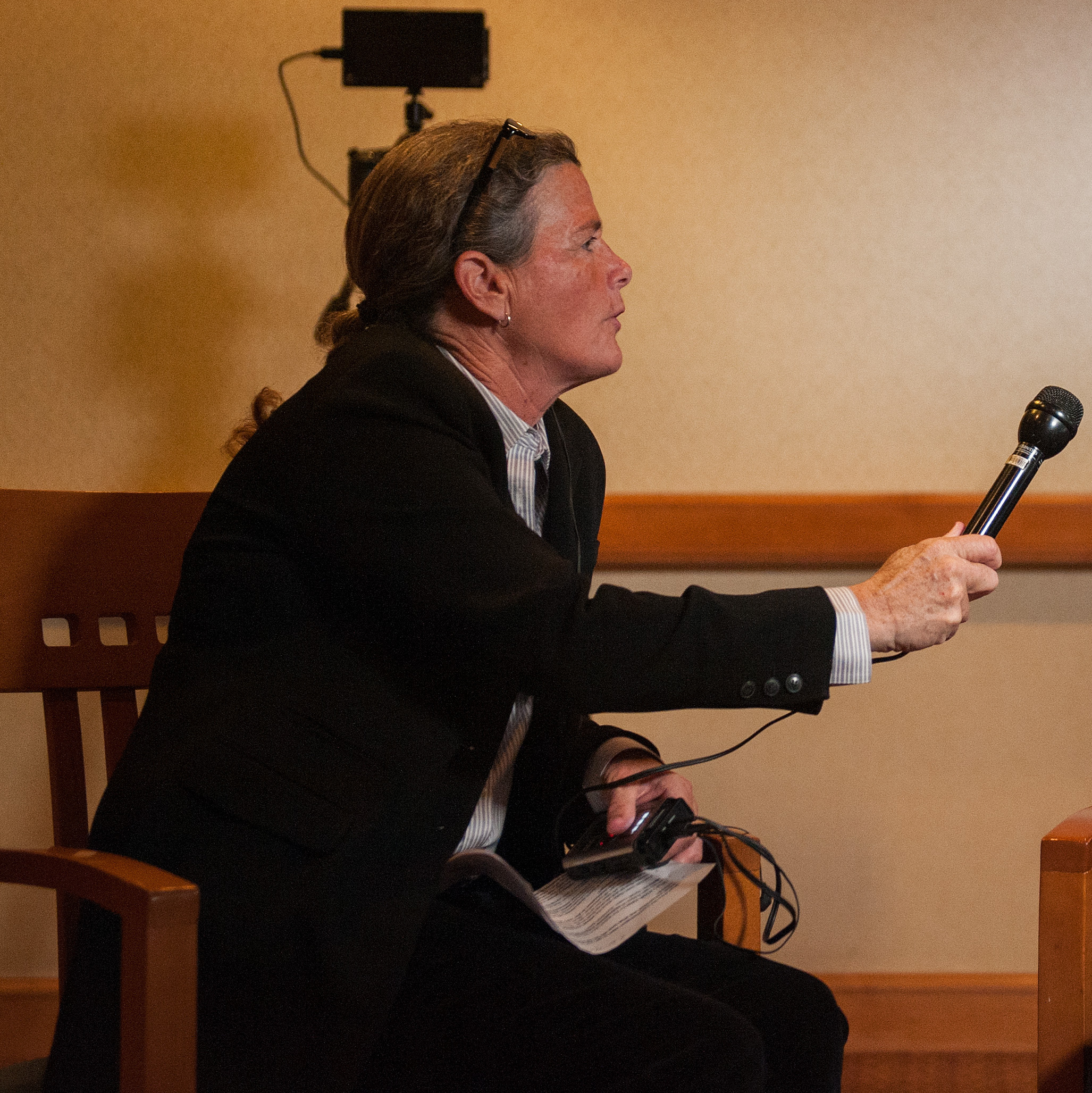
- Arnold in 2015
- Born: 1959 or 1960; Northampton, Massachusetts, U.S.
- Died: June 18, 2026 (aged 66); Anchorage, Alaska, U.S.
- Occupation: Journalist
- Awards: Dirksen Award

Elizabeth Arnold (1959 or 1960 – June 18, 2026) was an American journalist who was NPR's National Political Correspondent. After 17 years with NPR she returned to Alaska and was a tenured Professor and Chair of the Department of Journalism and Communication at the University of Alaska Anchorage. Among most notable awards, she was honored with the Joan Shorenstein Barone Award from Harvard in 1994, the duPont Columbia Silver Baton in 1994-95 for political coverage, and the 1997 Dirksen Award for distinguished reporting of Congress. She continued to report from Alaska on Arctic issues for NPR and Public Radio International (PRI) and created the website arcticprofiles.com with a grant from the National Park Service. In 2018, Arnold was awarded a fellowship at Harvard's Shorenstein Center on the Press, Politics and Public Policy.

== Life and career ==
Arnold graduated from Colgate University cum laude.

She was a reporter for KTOO. Arnold was Washington bureau Correspondent for NPR from 1991 to 2006.

Arnold lived in Anchorage. She died from complications of endometrial cancer on June 18, 2026, at the age of 66.
