= Mother Country Radicals =

Podcast about the Weather Underground

Mother Country Radicals is a documentary podcast about The Weather Underground hosted by Zayd Ayers Dohrn and produced by Crooked Media and Audacy.

== Background ==
The show is hosted by Northwestern University professor Zayd Ayers Dohrn who is the son of Bernardine Dohrn and Bill Ayers. The show was produced by Crooked Media and Audacy. The show debuted during the January 6 hearings. The series ended on July 28, 2022. The show is composed of 10 episodes.

The show was created during the COVID-19 pandemic. Zayd Ayers Dohrn was making the show when George Floyd was killed. Kathy Boudin died before the show was released.

The show won an award at the Tribeca festival alongside a similar show about counter culture in the 70s called I Was Never There. The series was similar to the 2002 documentary The Weather Underground.

== Reception ==
Billy Binion criticized the show in Reason Magazine saying that although the show provides a thorough history of the Weather Underground it was not critical enough of the group's actions. Daniel S. Chard criticized the show in the Jacobin saying that the show neglected to explore the merits of urban guerrilla warfare as a method of political change or to acknowledge that the actions of the group physically harmed anyone, which resulted in what Chard calls "radical nostalgia".

=== Awards ===
Award	Date	Category	Result	Ref.
New York Festivals Radio Awards	2023	Narrative/Documentary Podcast	Gold	
Alfred I. duPont–Columbia University Award	2024	Best in audio and video reporting	Won	
Tribeca Festival Awards	2022	Best Audio Storytelling in Nonfiction	Won	
Shorty Awards	2023	True Crime & Documentary Podcast	Won	
