= Unnatural Causes: Is Inequality Making Us Sick? =

2008 American documentary series

Unnatural Causes: Is Inequality Making Us Sick? is a four-hour documentary series, broadcast nationally in the United States on PBS in spring 2008, that examines the role of social determinants of health in creating health inequalities/health disparities (which the film considers health inequities) in the US. Based on extensive research by a wide variety of academics, public health experts and medical practitioners, the seven-part series explores how class and racism can have greater impacts on one's health outcomes than genetics or personal behavior.

The opening 56-minute episode, "In Sickness and In Wealth", presents the series' overarching themes. Each supporting half-hour episode, set in a different ethnic/racial community, provides a deeper exploration of how social conditions affect population health, and how some communities are extending their lives by improving them.

== Episode descriptions ==
=== Episode 1: "In Sickness and In Wealth" (56 min.) ===
Produced by Christine Herbes-Sommers and Llewellyn M. Smith; co-produced by Julie Crawford; directed by: Llewellyn M. Smith

The first hour of the series presents a general framework for understanding the relevance of social determinants of health in creating health inequalities in the United States. The episode introduces the U.S.’s poor health statistics (according to the film) compared to other wealthy industrialized countries, then presents research from Michael Marmot’s Whitehall studies, which found that health status and wealth correlate on a continuous gradient from the poor to the wealthy. To understand why this gradient exists, the program looks at the negative health effects of chronic stress, and at evidence that those lower on the social spectrum suffer more from exposure to “toxic stress.” Throughout the program, these fairly academic and complex arguments about stress, class, and health are humanized through the stories of four residents of Louisville, Kentucky, from four different socio-economic levels. Through looking at the lives of a hospital CEO, a lab supervisor, a janitor, and an unemployed mother, the program illustrates how stress increases and control over one's life decreases as one moves down the socio-economic ladder, with very real consequences for health.

The program includes interviews with the following experts: Nicholas Christakis (Medical Sociologist, Harvard University), Sheldon Cohen (Psychologist, Carnegie Mellon University), Ana Diez Roux (Epidemiologist, University of Michigan), Tony Iton (Director, Alameda County Public Health Dept.), Ichiro Kawachi (Epidemiologist, Harvard School of Public Health), Nancy Krieger (Social Epidemiologist, Harvard School of Public Health), Michael Marmot (Epidemiologist, University College London), Bruce McEwen (Neuroscientist, Rockefeller University), Carol Shively (Comparative Psychologist, Wake Forest University), Jack P. Shonkoff (Pediatrician, Harvard Center on the Developing Child), S. Leonard Syme (Epidemiologist, UC Berkeley), Adewale Troutman (Director, Louisville Metro Public Health & Wellness), and David Williams (Sociologist, Harvard School of Public Health).

=== Episode 2: "When the Bough Breaks" (27 min.) ===
Produced by Tracy Heather Strain, Randall MacLowry, and Eric Stange; directed by Tracy Heather Strain

This episode examines the phenomenon that African American women, on average, are significantly more likely to give birth to premature and/or low-weight babies than white women, even when studies control for factors like income and education. Interviews with neonatologists James Collins (Children's Memorial Hospital, Chicago) and Richard David (Stroger Hospital of Cook County) present the theory that this inequality could be due in part to lifelong exposure to the chronic stress of racism. After providing evidence against genetic causes for the disparity, the program further explores how exposure to racism might affect health. Obstetrician Michael Lu (UCLA School of Medicine) discusses the “life course model,” which posits that an individual's health is determined not only by genetics and current circumstances, but by all circumstances experienced since conception (and even before). The negative physiological effects of chronic stress during pregnancy are discussed, and interviews with David Williams (Sociologist, Harvard School of Public Health), Camara Phyllis Jones (Physician and Social Epidemiologist, CDC), Nancy Krieger (Social Epidemiologist, Harvard School of Public Health), Carol Hogue (Epidemiologist, Emory University), and Fleda Jackson (Psychologist, Emory University) explore the legacy and persistence of racism against African Americans in the United States.

The episode weaves in the personal story of Kim Anderson, a well-paid African American lawyer in good health, who “did everything right,” but still delivered her first child two and a half months early.

=== Episode 3: "Becoming American" (27 min.) ===
Produced and directed by Patricia Garcia Rios and Maria Teresa Rodriguez

This episode discusses the phenomenon that new Latino immigrants, though often poor, generally have better health than the average American. Evidence that social ties are good for health is considered as a possible factor in this health advantage, sometimes called the "Latino Paradox."

=== Episode 4: "Bad Sugar" (27 min.) ===
Produced and directed by James M. Fortier (Métis-Ojibway); co-produced by Sativa January

This episode examines the very high rates of adult onset diabetes among the Pima Indians of southwest Arizona. The film states that forty years of research have produced no evidence of a genetic cause; the program explores how the tribe's diet changed dramatically when the diversion of water to white farmers and cities made the reservation residents dependent on government food programs to avoid starvation. Now that the Tohono O'odham tribe has regained their water rights and is returning to farming, community groups are working to promote cultural renewal and new economic opportunities, hoping improve diets and living conditions and beat diabetes.

=== Episode 5: "Place Matters" (27 min.) ===
Produced and directed by Ellie Lee

This episode considers the importance of neighborhood environments (such as pollution, violence, parks, and schools) to health. The program first travels to Richmond, California, to meet Gwai Boonkeut, a Laotian immigrant in his forties who recently suffered a major heart attack. Looking at the urban blight, lack of services, pollution, and violence endemic to Richmond since its post-World War II decline, the show considers how a neighborhood environment may limit healthy choices and contribute to chronic stress for its residents. Interviews with scholars and community action groups also present evidence that the poor state of many of the country's inner cities arose from historical factors and government housing policies that favored the white middle class. The program then travels to Seattle to see how community activists, public health officials, and others came together to transform the High Point neighborhood.

=== Episode 6: "Collateral Damage" (27 min.) ===
Directed and produced by Eric Stange; co-produced by Kimberlee Bassford

This episode looks at the legacy of United States presence in the equatorial Pacific nation of the Marshall Islands. Decades ago, local residents were relocated from their home islands to make way for U.S. nuclear weapons testing. While the program mentions the immediate health consequences for the Marshallese people due to nuclear fallout from testing, it also goes further to consider how the military presence continues to affect the small nation. Specifically, it considers the relationship between the U.S. military base on Kwajalein, where American citizens live relatively healthy, middle-class lives, and Ebeye, home to most of the base's Marshallese employees, where overcrowding, failing infrastructure, and poverty contribute to chronic tuberculosis and low life expectancies. The episode ends with a brief look at the Marshallese community in Springdale, Arkansas. Interviewees include the former Marshall Islands Senator and anti-nuclear weapons campaigner, Abacca Anjain-Maddison.

=== Episode 7: "Not Just a Paycheck" (29 min.) ===
Directed and produced by James Rutenbeck; co-produced by Franziska Blome

This episode explores how the closing of the Electrolux factory in Greenville, Michigan had serious negative effects on the health of the community. The program ends by comparing the situation in Greenville with that of Västervik, Sweden, where workers who lost their jobs after an Electrolux factory closure fared much better due to income and educational supports.

== Production and distribution ==
Unnatural Causes was produced by Larry Adelman for the San Francisco-based non-profit California Newsreel, in collaboration with Boston-based Vital Pictures. The series was scheduled for national PBS broadcast from March 27 to April 17, 2008, and shown by 180 affiliate stations. National Minority Consortia acted as the series' public television presenter. California Newsreel distributes the series on DVD and video streaming.

The series producers, in collaboration with the Joint Center for Political and Economic Studies Health Policy Institute, undertook a campaign to raise awareness of the series' utility for public education and mobilizing. Several major health and labor groups have adopted the series for their own work, including the National Association of County and City Health Officials (NACCHO), the Service Employees International Union (SEIU), Kaiser Permanente and the Blue Cross Foundation of Minnesota.
