= Do You Speak American? =

- Title card from the three-part documentary, featuring co-author and host Robert MacNeil.
- Screenplay by: William Cran & Robert MacNeil
- Directed by: William Cran
- Starring: Robert MacNeil
- Theme music composer: Paul Foss
- Country of origin: United States
- Original language: English

Production
- Producers: William Cran, Christopher Buchanan
- Editor: Joe Frost
- Running time: 180 minutes (3 episodes, 60 minutes each)
- Production company: Thirteen/WNET

Original release
- Release: January 5, 2005

Do You Speak American?
- The cover as seen on the hardback, first edition printing.
- Author: Robert MacNeil & William Cran
- Language: English
- Genre: Non-fiction
- Publisher: Nan A. Talese (hardback), Mariner Books (paperback), Nan A. Talese, Random House Digital, Inc. (E-book)
- Publication date: December 28, 2004 (hardback), November 14, 2005 (paperback), December 18, 2007 (E-book)
- Media type: Print (hardback and paperback), Digital (E-book)
- Pages: 240
- ISBN: 978-0-385-51198-8

Do You Speak American? is a documentary film and accompanying book about journalist Robert MacNeil's investigation into how different people throughout the United States of America speak. The book and documentary look at the evolution of America's way of speaking from the English language to various ways of speaking in regions throughout the country. Divisions of ethnicity, geography and social status and how they affect how Americans communicate are addressed. As part of the project, MacNeil traveled across the country conducting interviews with ordinary people as well as experts such as William Labov.

In the United States, the documentary was broadcast in several parts on PBS. The companion book (ISBN 0-385-51198-1) was co-authored by MacNeil and William Cran.
