= Deborah Amos =

American journalist

Deborah Amos is an American journalist. Until 2023, she was an international correspondent for NPR, where she focused on the Middle East.

== Career ==
Amos attended the University of Florida, where she earned a bachelor's degree in journalism. Her first job in the journalism field was for ABC Orlando, where she was hired as a TV news reporter.

Amos first gained attention in the journalism world for producing the NPR radio documentary Father Cares: The Last of Jonestown. After producing several radio documentaries, she became a foreign war correspondent in 1982. During the 1980s she worked in both Iraq and Syria. In 1989 she covered Poland's first democratic election, the Tiananmen Square protests, and the Fall of the Berlin Wall.

Amos turned to television journalism in 1993, and went on to report for the ABC programs Nightline, Turning Point, and World News Tonight, and for several PBS programs for the next decade.

Amos is a Ferris Professor of Journalism in Residence at Princeton University. She was previously the James H. Ottaway Sr. Professor of Journalism at the State University of New York at New Paltz in 2013 and 2015. In 2016 she was named vice president of the Overseas Press Club of America.

In the 2020s, Amos has focused her reporting on covering refugee issues.

== Publications ==
- Lines in the Sand: Desert Storm and the Remaking of the Arab World. Simon and Schuster. 1992.
- Eclipse of the Sunnis: Power, Exile, and Upheaval in the Middle East. Public Affairs. 2010.

== Recognition ==
- 1991-1992 Nieman Fellow at Harvard University
- 2004 Alfred I. DuPont-‐Columbia Award for coverage of Iraq
- 2009 Edward Weintal Prize for Diplomatic Reporting from Georgetown University
- 2010 Edward R. Murrow Lifetime Achievement Award
- 2010 Shorenstein Fellow at the Kennedy School
- 2013 Peabody Award
- 2013 Alfred I. DuPont-‐Columbia Award for "intelligent and resourceful coverage of the bloody uprising in Syria"
- Alliance for Women in Media Foundation recognition (2013)
- 2017 Courage in Journalism Award from the International Women’s Media Foundation
- 2020 Dart Award for "Syria Torture Survivors Seek Justice"
- Berlin Prize Fellowship for a semester at the American Academy Berlin (2022)
