= Charlie D'Agata =

American journalist

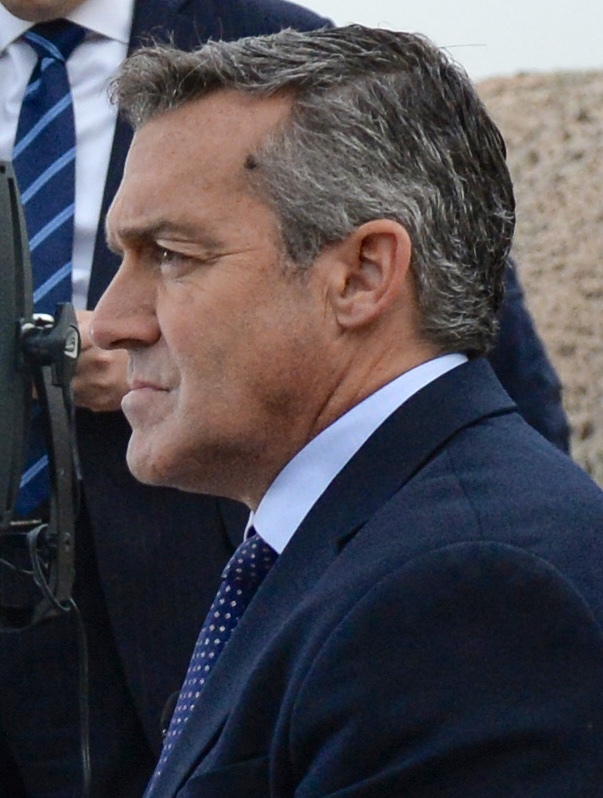
- Charlie D'Agata of CBS News in 2015
- Education: Colorado State University
- Occupation: Foreign reporter
- Organization: CBS News

Charlie D'Agata is a CBS News senior foreign reporter based in their London Bureau since 2011.

== Biography ==
Born in Lawrence, Massachusetts, D’Agata graduated from Colorado State University with a B.A. in journalism. D'Agata began his career in 1992 in London as an Assignment Editor for ABC News. He was a correspondent for APTN in London until 2002, when he joined CBS News, first as chief overseas correspondent for CBS Radio, then as London correspondent for CBS Newspath.

== Honors ==
He won the Overseas Press Club Award in 2013. His work has helped CBS News win a number of Edward R. Murrow awards. His reporting from Cairo helped CBS News win the 2017 Alfred I. duPont–Columbia University Award and the Sigma Delta Chi award.

== Controversy ==
On February 26, 2022, during the Russian invasion of Ukraine, D'Agata was criticized by multiple media outlets when he described this conflict as being different, as it involved "civilized" people, unlike Iraq or Afghanistan, stating "This is a relatively civilised, relatively European – I have to choose those words carefully too unlike [Iraq] or [Afghanistan] – city, where you wouldn’t expect that or hope that it’s going to happen." D'Agata apologized for these comments later that day, calling them a "poor choice of words", even though he had previously presented them as "carefully chosen words" in his correspondent report.
