= Peter Jennings Reporting =

American television series

- Genre: News
- Presented by: Peter Jennings
- Country of origin: United States

Production
- Production company: PJ Productions

Original release
- Network: ABC
- Release: January 24, 1990 – December 15, 2005

Peter Jennings Reporting was a continuing series of documentaries produced and hosted by ABC News anchor Peter Jennings that aired on ABC. Many of these documentaries were produced by Jennings's production company, PJ Productions, and are currently distributed in DVD format by Koch Vision. The series debuted in 1990.

Documentaries include The Search for Jesus in 2000 and Jesus and Paul — the Word and the Witness in 2004. International news was also a focus of these documentaries, covering the tense relations between India and Pakistan, the conflict in Bosnia, the crisis in Haiti, the war in Iraq, and the drug trade in Central and South America. Important domestic issues also reported were gun control policy, the politics of abortion, the crisis in funding for the arts and a highly praised chronicle of the accused bombers of Oklahoma City. The series earned many awards, including the 2004 Edward R. Murrow award for best documentary for The Kennedy Assassination — Beyond Conspiracy.

== Awards ==
- Peter Jennings Reporting won Peabody Awards in 1990 for Guns and 1995 for Hiroshima - Why the Bomb was Dropped.
- Peter Jennings Reporting won Alfred I. duPont–Columbia University Awards in 1991 for From the Killing Fields, 1992 for A Line in the Sand: War or Peace?, and 1995 for While America Watched--The Bosnia Tragedy.
