= Miki Meek =

American radio producer and journalist

- Occupation: Radio producer

Miki Meek is an American radio producer and journalist best known as a producer for the radio program This American Life. She was an intern and then freelanced for the show before joining the staff in December 2012. She has worked as an online producer and editor at National Geographic and The New York Times. Meek has won two Emmy Awards for documentary programming.

== Early life and career ==
Meek was born to a Japanese mother and a White American father. She grew up in the Church of Jesus Christ of Latter-day Saints in West Mountain, Utah. In her early teens, the family moved to Japan and she attended an international school, where she bonded with other biracial students. Ultimately in 1997, she graduated from Payson High School in Utah County, Utah. Meek speaks Japanese. As an adult, she changed her name from Miriam to Miki, her mother's nickname for her, explaining, "It is definitely more me. It gives a nod to my Japanese side."

While still in college, Meek started her journalism career as a newspaper stringer for The Salt Lake Tribune. She next found work as an online producer and editor National Geographic, specializing in interactive and visual storytelling; she ultimately helped launch the magazine's first website. Meek transferred to The New York Times in 2008, serving in a similar role, where she stayed until 2011.

Meek was one of the producers who earned a 2010 Emmy Award for New Approaches to News & Documentary Programming: Documentaries for One in 8 Million. She won the award again the following year for the documentary 14 Actors Acting. In 2014, she and 15 other contributors created the Instagram account @everydayusa, with the goal of answering "What does America mean to me?" to people of varying backgrounds. In 2019, she was one of the producers awarded a 2019 duPont–Columbia Award two-part episode "Our Town" of This American Life.

== Awards ==
- Emmy for New Approaches to News & Documentary Programming: Documentaries (2010) – One in 8 Million
- duPont-Columbia Award (2019) – "Our Town" episode of This American Life
- Gerald Loeb Award for Audio (2022) – "'We're Coming for You': For Public Health Officials, a Year of Threats and Menace"
