= Mary Walsh (journalist) =

American television journalist

- Education: University of Texas at Austin
- Occupations: Journalist and producer

Mary Walsh is an American journalist and former producer at CBS News.

== Education ==
She graduated from University of Texas at Austin College of Communication in 1977 with a bachelor's degree in journalism. At UT, she was a member of the Friar Society and the editor of The Daily Texan.

== Career ==
Walsh began her career in Washington, D.C. as assistant to the political director at CBS News. As a journalist, she covered the explosion of the space shuttle Challenger, the bombing of Pan Am Flight 103, and Vice President George H. W. Bush's campaign for president. Walsh works as a national security producer for CBS New where she has been assigned to the Pentagon since 1993. She is responsible for covering American military throughout Southeast Asia, Europe, and the Middle East. She was a media gamer in Dark Winter.

== Honors and awards ==
She won a 2002 and a 2004 duPont-Columbia Award, the Joan Shorenstein Barone Award, and a Wilbur Award. Walsh was named the 2009-10 College of Communication Outstanding Alumnus from the University of Texas at Austin. Walsh is also a five-time Emmy winner with twelve total nominations in News & Documentary and Sports.
