= James Rutenbeck =

American filmmaker and director

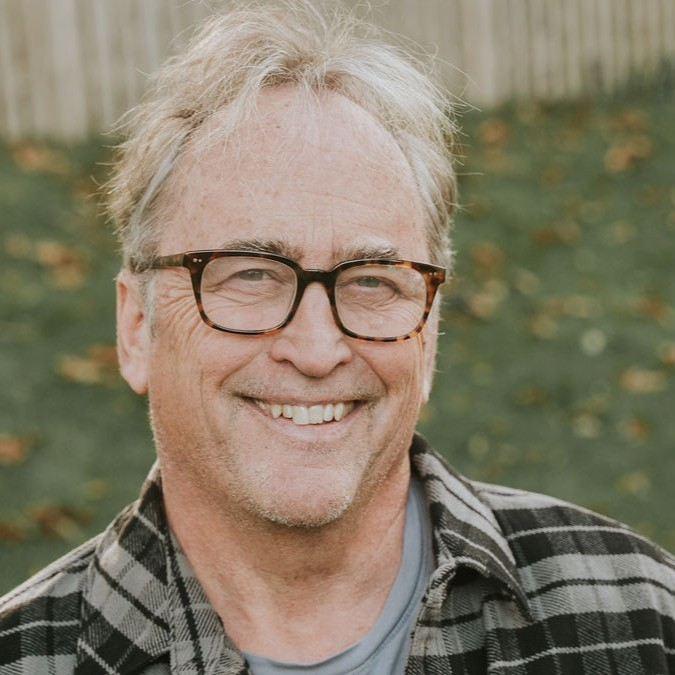
- Education: Macalester College (B.A., magna cum laude, 1975)
- Occupation: Nonfiction filmmaker
- Years active: 1990–present
- Known for: A Reckoning in Boston, Class of '27
- Website: Lost Nation Pictures

James Rutenbeck is an American nonfiction film producer, director and editor.. He is the director of A Reckoning in Boston (2021), a feature-length documentary that examines systemic racism and class barriers through the lens of adult students in Boston's Dorchester neighborhood.

== Early life and education ==
James Rutenbeck grew up in DeWitt, Iowa, a small farming town in eastern Iowa.

He earned a Bachelor of Arts degree from Macalester College in 1975, graduating magna cum laude. He received a Master of Science in Visual Studies from the Massachusetts Institute of Technology Film/Video Section in 1984, where he studied with filmmaker Richard Leacock. He later became a Fellow at the Harvard University Film Study Center (2019–2020) and a Journalism Fellow at the Poynter Institute and Yale University in 2021.

== Career ==
Rutenbeck directed Losing Ground (1988), a psychological portrait of an Iowa family facing the loss of their small farm. Losing Ground screened at Cinema du Reel and Museum of Modern Art.

Rutenbeck directed Raise the Dead (1998), a documentary examining itinerant holiness preachers in the Appalachian region. Raise the Dead premiered at Cinema du Reel in 1999.

He directed Scenes from a Parish (2009), which chronicled tensions within a diverse Catholic parish in a former mill town in Massachusetts. Scenes from a Parish was broadcast on the PBS series Independent Lens.

In 2016, he executive produced, directed and edited Class of '27, a three short film anthology about young children in three low-income rural American communities. Class of '27 was an Editor's Pick at The Atlantic and winner of the Alfred I. duPont Columbia University Award.

Rutenbeck has edited films for independent filmmakers and the PBS series American Experience, including Roberto Clemente, Jimmy Carter, Zoot Suit Riots and God in America. He produced an episode of the PBS series on the social determinants of health, Unnatural Causes: Is Inequality Making Us Sick?

In 2021, Rutenbeck released A Reckoning in Boston, a feature-length documentary that originated as a portrait of students in the Clemente Course in the Humanities but turned into a broader examination of systemic racism, gentrification, and class inequity in Boston. The film incorporates first-person narration by Rutenbeck and storytelling with its subjects. The film premiered as part of PBS's "Independent Lens" series.

He edited the Emmy® Award-winning My Disability Roadmap and The Ride Ahead, with directors Samuel and Dan Habib. In 2023, he directed and produced Nixon Reversal, a documentary examining the political transformation of Richard Nixon. The film was nominated for a national Emmy Award and received The Motion Awards.

== Awards and recognition ==
He is a recipient of a national Emmy Award and has twice been awarded the Alfred I. duPont–Columbia University Award. He was also recipient of a grant award from the Sundance Institute Documentary Fund.
