= The Story of English =

1986 nine-part television series

The Story of English is a nine-part documentary series, produced in 1986, detailing the development of the English language.

The Story of English is also a companion book, also produced in 1986.

The book and the television series were written by Robert MacNeil, Robert McCrum, and William Cran. The book has been revised twice, once in 1993, and again in 2002.

The documentary series was directed by William Cran, and originally broadcast on the BBC, then later on PBS. It was co-produced by MacNeil/Lehrer Productions and the BBC, and was principally funded through a grant from General Foods. The third episode, "A Muse of Fire", won the 1987 Primetime Emmy Award for Outstanding Individual Achievement - Informational Programming - Writing. The series was released as a 5-tape box set in 2001, running 495 minutes.

The book and series have been used in university courses.

== Episode list ==
1. An English Speaking World: Discusses how English has become the most dominant language throughout the world.
2. The Mother Tongue: Discusses the early stages of the English language, including Old English and Middle English.
3. A Muse of Fire: Discusses the influence of William Shakespeare and the King James Bible on the English language as well as how Early Modern English took root in the American colonies and its influence on contemporary American English.
4. The Guid Scots Tongue: Discusses the Scottish influence on the English language.
5. Black on White: Discusses the black community's influence on the English language. (Includes interviews with Philadelphia rappers The Scanner Boys, Parry P and Grand Tone.)
6. Pioneers, O Pioneers!: Discusses Canadian English and the various forms of American English.
7. The Muvver Tongue: Discusses Cockney dialect and Australian English.
8. The Loaded Weapon: Discusses the Irish influence on the English Language.
9. Next Year's Words: Discusses the future and new emerging forms of the English language.
