= Jonathan Torgovnik =

Israeli photographer

Jonathan Torgovnik (Hebrew: יונתן טורגובניק; born 1969) is an Israeli photographer and photojournalist. He lives in Johannesburg, in South Africa. He spent two years in Rwanda photographing women who had been systematically raped during the Rwandan genocide in 1994, and the children born from those rapes. The photographs and the story were published in the Daily Telegraph magazine in 2007. A charity, Foundation Rwanda, was founded as a result. In 2014, Torgovnik returned to Rwanda. In 2015 he documented the lives of migrants who have moved, many of them illegally, to South Africa from other African countries such as Tanzania, Zimbabwe and Malawi.

== Life and work ==
Torgovnik was born in 1969 in Tel Aviv, Israel. In 2006 he was commissioned by Newsweek to document the effects of twenty-five years of AIDS in Africa. While in Rwanda, he met Tutsi women who had been victims of systematic rape during the Rwandan genocide in 1994, many of whom had contracted AIDS, and many of whom had children fathered by the rapists. His photographs of these women were published in Stern and in the Daily Telegraph magazine in 2007. In the same year, one of them, a portrait of "Joseline Ingabire with her daughter Leah Batamuliza, Rwanda", won the Photographic Portrait Prize of the National Portrait Gallery in London. The photographs were published as a book, Intended Consequences: Rwandan Children Born of Rape, in 2009. In 2012 they won Torgovnik the Prix Découverte, the highest prize at the annual Rencontres d'Arles photography festival in Arles, in Provence in southern France.

== Reception ==
- New York University, Arthur L. Carer Journalism Institute: Nomination - Intended Consequences
- Getty Images Grant for Editorial photography, 2007 - Intended Consequences
- Open Society Institute Fellowship Distribution Grant 2007 - Intended Consequences
- National Portrait Gallery Prize 2007 - Intended Consequences
- World Press Photo Award 2009 - Amato Opera in New York, originally commissioned by German Geo Magazine
- Emmy nomination 2009 - Intended Consequences (produced by MediaStorm)
- American Photography Award - Intended Consequences (Aperture 2009)
- duPont Journalism Award 2010, Columbia University Graduate School of Journalism - Intended Consequences
- PDN: 2010 Annual Competition - Aftermath of the Haiti Earthquake, originally shot for CNN.
- PDN: 2010 Annual Competition - Intended Consequences (Aperture 2009)
- Prix découverte d'arles 2012 - Discovery Award at the Rencontres d’Arles festival, Arles, France - Intended Consequences
- Getty Grant for Editorial Photography, 2016 - African migrants in Johannesburg

== Books ==
- Bollywood Dreams: An Exploration of the Motion Picture Industry and its Culture in India. London: Phaidon, 2003. ISBN 9780714844565.
- Intended Consequences: Rwandan Children Born of Rape (with accompanying DVD). New York: Aperture, 2009. ISBN 9781597111010.
