= Ivan Watson =

American journalist (born 1975)

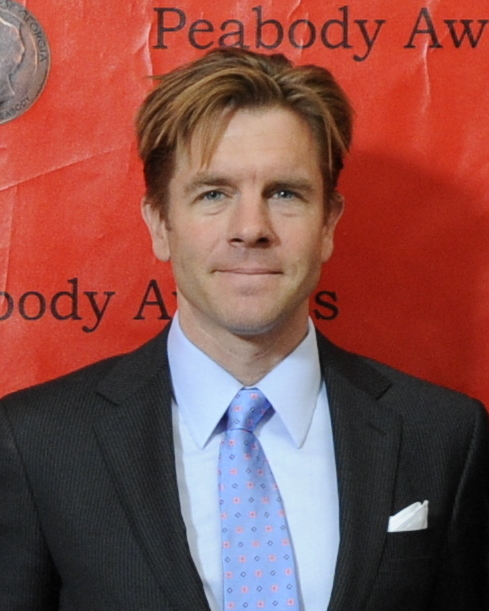
- Watson at the 2012 Peabody Awards
- Born: 1975 (age 50–51); Atlanta, Georgia, U.S.
- Education: Brown University

Ivan Watson (born 1975) is a senior international correspondent for CNN based in Hong Kong. Earlier in his career he was a producer for CNN, based in Russia, and was then a reporter for NPR. Watson has covered civil unrest in Egypt, the Second Chechen War, Haiti, conflicts in West Africa, the war in Iraq, and the War In Afghanistan.

Watson was born in 1975 in Atlanta, Georgia. He graduated from Brown University in 1997 with a degree in international relations. He has reported from Moscow and for NPR based in Istanbul, Turkey before rejoining CNN in 2009.

In 2000 Watson reported for NPR in West Africa. He then covered Afghanistan from 2001 for five years and was based in Istanbul, Turkey. He was detained for 30 minutes during a protest in Turkey.

Watson has a Russian Orthodox background and was a Moscow-based reporter for CNN in the 1990s. Watson has also covered the war in Ukraine.

In Iraq, an armored BMW Watson was traveling in was blown up by what was believed to be a sticky bomb while he and his crew were kept away by Iraqi security forces.

Watson was among four CNN reporters who appeared on the Charlie Rose show to discuss the war in Syria.

For relief and respite from the emotional toll of covering war and devastation, Watson said he has used therapy sessions and balances his reporting with feature stories, for example a millionaire doctor in the mountains of Kyrgyzstan using hypnosis and shamanistic traditions to treat heroin addicts and Kangal sheepdogs in the Turkish highlands of Anatolia.
