= Martin Fletcher (TV reporter) =

British television journalist and writer

- Born: 1947 (age 78–79); London, England
- Education: University of Bradford
- Occupation: Correspondent
- Title: NBC News Special Correspondent, author
- Website: http://www.martinfletcher.net

Martin Fletcher (born 1947) is an English author and retired NBC News' Middle East correspondent and Tel Aviv Bureau chief. He retired from NBC News after 32 years to work on his fourth book (and second novel). He returned to NBC in 2010 as a freelance Special Correspondent. He also reported for PBS Weekend Newshour.

== Biography ==
Fletcher was born in London in 1947 to a Jewish family, the son of Georg and Edith, Austrian Jewish refugees to London. He graduated from the University of Bradford in 1970. He worked as a French and German interpreter for the European Economic Community. He began his career as a television news programming writer for Visnews in the UK in 1970. He joined the BBC, writing on the main evening television news program, the 9 O'Clock News, until returning to Visnews after teaching himself to be a news cameraman. After four years in Belgium, Israel, and Rhodesia he joined NBC News.

He started with NBC News as a cameraman in 1977 in South Africa; after working in the Paris and Frankfurt bureaus he began his Tel Aviv assignment as a network correspondent in 1982. He added Bureau Chief to his duties in 1996.

He has received five Emmy awards for his work on the first Palestinian uprising, the second Palestinian uprising, Rwanda, Kosovo, and trauma medicine in Israel. He has received numerous other awards including the television Pulitzer, the duPont from Columbia University, five Overseas Press Club awards, several Edward R. Murrow awards, a Hugo gold medal for a documentary on Israel which he shared with other NBC staffers, and an award from Britain's Royal Television Society.

Fletcher is the author of Breaking News, which has received universal recognition as one of the best books ever on the work of a foreign correspondent. His second book, Walking Israel: A Personal Search for the Soul of a Nation, was published in October 2010 and won the American National Jewish Book Award. His first novel, The List, published in 2011, was selected as the "One Book One Jewish Community" book of the year.

== Books ==
Nonfiction

- Breaking News: A Stunning and Memorable Account of Reporting from Some of the Most Dangerous Places in the World, New York: St. Martin's Press, 2008
- Walking Israel: A Personal Search for the Soul of a Nation, New York: St. Martin's Press, 2010

Fiction

- The List, New York: St. Martin's Press, 2011
- Jacob's Oath, New York: St. Martin's Press, 2013
- The War Reporter, New York: St. Martin's Press, 2015
- Promised Land, New York: St. Martin's Press, 2018
