= Emanuele Berry =

American writer and journalist

- Born: Emanuele Mikala Berry
- Citizenship: American
- Education: Michigan State University (BA)
- Occupations: Writer, Producer, Journalist
- Writing career
- Language: English
- Notable awards: 2015 Fulbright award to China, 2014 AIR New Voices Scholar, 2013 Hearst Journalism Award, 2008 inaugural winner of the Molly Peterman Award

Emanuele Berry is an American writer, radio producer and journalist. She is the Executive Editor at This American Life and previously worked as a producer and editor at Gimlet Media.

== Career ==
Berry joined This American Life in 2019 as a producer and editor where she reported and co-produced episodes, including the 2020 protests in Hong Kong. She was promoted to the role of Executive Editor - a role she has held since October 2020. Berry is considered the only staff member to date to have broken reality TV news in her reporting for the show. In March 2021, she provided editorial assistance to The Improvement Association podcast at The New York Times. Berry has also been named as one of the guest lecturers for the Sony backed podcast studio Neon Hum Media's diverse training bootcamp .

Before This American Life, Berry was an editor and producer at Gimlet Media, where she ran and worked on several shows including The Nod, Undone, and StartUp. In 2014, she was a producer at WKAR Public Radio in Michigan. and later moved to St. Louis Public Radio as race and culture reporter where she covered the Ferguson protests She co-founded and hosted the St. Louis Public Radio podcast We Live Here.

In 2015, Berry was a Fulbright recipient of an English Teaching Assistantship to Macau and a 2014 AIR New Voices Scholar.

Her work has been recognized by the Michigan Association of Broadcasters, the Society of Professional Journalists, the Radio Television Digital News Association and the Hearst Journalism Awards Program.

== Education ==
Berry attended Michigan State University and graduated in 2012 with a B.A in journalism with an additional major in the Residential College of Arts and Humanities. Before Michigan State University, she attended Lansing Eastern High School where she was a four-year starter, and Captain of the Varsity basketball team and Albion College (2008 - 2009) in Michigan.

Berry was born and raised in Michigan to Black father - Bobby Berry and a white mother - Eileen.
