= Tom Pettit =

American television journalist (1931–1995)

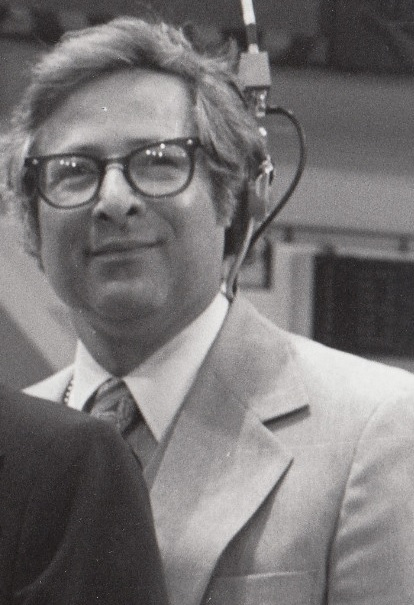
- Pettit at the 1976 Democratic National Convention
- Born: William Thomas Pettit; April 23, 1931; Cincinnati, Ohio, U.S.
- Died: December 22, 1995 (aged 64); New York City, U.S.
- Occupation: News correspondent
- Years active: 1953–1995

William Thomas Pettit (April 23, 1931 – December 22, 1995) was an American journalist, who was a television news correspondent for NBC from the 1960s through 1995. During most of that period, he filed reports for NBC Nightly News (as well as the preceding Huntley-Brinkley Report) and served numerous times on the panel of Meet the Press. He served as one of NBC's floor reporters at the political conventions in 1972, 1976, and 1980.

== Biography ==
Pettit began his broadcasting career in the state of his upbringing, Iowa, first working for WOI-TV located then in Ames, Iowa, followed by a stint with KCRG-TV in Cedar Rapids, Iowa during the 1950s before moving on to positions at WCCO-TV in Minneapolis, Minnesota and at the NBC owned-and-operated station, now KYW-TV in Philadelphia, Pennsylvania. His first position with the NBC network was in the network's Los Angeles bureau, where he worked for 13 years, except for a brief tenure with National Educational Television. By 1975, Pettit moved to the Washington, D.C. bureau, where he would cover national affairs until 1982, when he became executive vice president of NBC News under president Reuven Frank. In 1985, he returned to reporting, serving as national affairs correspondent until 1989, when he began a three-year stint in NBC's London office. He continued working as a correspondent until 1995, the year of his death.

After President John F. Kennedy was assassinated in 1963, Pettit was dispatched to Dallas where he served, in effect, as a police reporter. In the famous footage of Lee Harvey Oswald being killed by Jack Ruby in Dallas, Pettit, standing six feet away, is heard exclaiming, "He's been shot. He's been shot. Lee (Harvey) Oswald has been shot." NBC was the only network airing Oswald's transfer live.

Pettit died after complications from surgery, at the age of 64.

== Awards ==
Pettit was best known for his acumen in interviewing national leaders, including several presidents. He won several awards for his coverage, notably the Peabody and Emmy awards.
