= Ernest Leiser =

American television news producer

Ernest Stern Leiser
- Born: Ernest Stern Leiser; February 26, 1921; Philadelphia, Pennsylvania
- Died: November 26, 2002 (aged 81); South Nyack, New York
- Education: University of Chicago (AB 1941)
- Occupations: Television news producer, writer, editor, reporter, and foreign correspondent
- Title: Executive Producer
- Spouse(s): Caroline Leiser (1921–2010)
- Children: Shelley Leiser; Nancy Leiser Foster; Nicholas Leiser ("Nick")

Ernest Leiser (February 26, 1921 – November 26, 2002) was an American executive producer of The CBS Evening News. He was recognized with Emmy and Peabody awards for coverage of post-war Europe, civil rights, and Vietnam. He was in charge of transitioning CBS News from radio to primarily television.

== Early life ==
Ernest Leiser was born in Philadelphia in 1921. After getting his Bachelor of Arts degree from the University of Chicago in 1941, he worked for Chicago news bureaus and papers.

== Early career ==
During World War II, he reported for the "Stars and Stripes" and was one of the first reporters to reach Berlin. He was also worked in military intelligence. For his service, he was decorated with the US Army's Bronze Star and the French Croix de Guerre. After the war, he worked in Frankfurt for the Overseas News Bureau.

In 1948, he covered the Berlin Airlift.

== CBS years ==
He joined CBS in July 1953 as a writer in the Public Affairs department in New York.

He was recognized with a Peabody award for his coverage and courage for taking risk of "life and limb" during the 1956 Hungarian Revolution. He was the first to get film out of the country. His coverage resulted in him sharing a Peabody Award for CBS.

In 1961, Leiser was replaced as bureau chief in Bonn by Daniel Schorr and became assistant general manager of CBS News for television.

Working under CBS News President Richard Salant, Leiser was a central figure in the radio-to-TV transition for CBS News and the newscast he produced was the first to expand from 15 to 30 minutes, allowing the news to be more than a headline service. He was an important part of CBS's coverage of the space program, political campaigns, conventions, and elections of national significance, civil rights and Vietnam

During the time Leiser was executive producer of the Evening News, it went from trailing NBC's Huntley-Brinkley newscast to first place. He also won Emmy Awards in three consecutive years (1969–1971) for

- Coverage of the assassination of Martin Luther King Jr. (1968) and its aftermath
- The documentary "Fathers and Sons" (1969)
- "The World of Charlie Company (1970)"

After the Tet offensive in Vietnam, Leiser and Walter Cronkite went to Vietnam and were invited to dine with General Creighton Abrams, the commander of all forces in Vietnam who Cronkite knew from World War II. Abrams told Cronkite, "we cannot win this Goddamned war, and we ought to find a dignified way out." Leiser wrote the speech that Cronkite delivered over the air that caused President Lyndon B. Johnson to say, "If I've lost Cronkite, I've lost Middle America." Johnson soon declined to run for re-election.

He also was instrumental in Dan Rather being hired and developed as a CBS reporter.

== At ABC with Harry Reasoner (1972–1975) ==
Harry Reasoner left CBS for ABC in 1970, and Leiser joined him in 1972 as executive producer of Reasoner's weekly news magazine, The Reasoner Report, which premiered early the following year.

== Returning to CBS News ==
He returned to CBS in 1975. His coverage of the 200th anniversary of America for 14 1/2 hours on July 4, 1976 (In Celebration of US (CBS),1976) won the network the Peabody Award. He became Vice President at CBS News. His coverage of the 1980 presidential campaign was awarded the Alfred I. DuPont award by Columbia University.

== Later years ==
In 1986 and later, he wrote that the TV news business had gone from being part of the public service required of a network to being looked at as a place to cut costs.

He decried the thinning out of the reporting ranks, the closing down of foreign bureaus, and the lack of prime-time documentaries.
He also taught journalism as a senior fellow at the Gannett Institute at Columbia.

=== Death ===
He died November 26, 2002, at his home in South Nyack, New York. At the time, Dan Rather said,

"Ernest Leiser was a wonderful family man and friend, a classy gentleman, a thorough scholar, an integrity-filled journalist and visionary leader of other journalists. He repeatedly proved he was one of the bravest and best American journalists in history—and one of the few who proved it in print, radio and television."
