= Jane Arraf =

Palestinian-Canadian journalist

- Jane Arraf
- Education: Carleton University
- Occupations: Journalist, correspondent
- Employer: NPR (2023–)

Jane Arraf (Arabic: جاين عراف) is a Palestinian-Canadian journalist. Until August 2023, she served as the Baghdad bureau chief of The New York Times. She previously worked for the Christian Science Monitor and as CNN's Baghdad Bureau Chief and Senior Correspondent.

== Education ==
Arraf studied journalism at Carleton University in Ottawa, Canada.

== Career ==
Arraf began her career at the Reuters agency where she was a correspondent in Montreal, Canada, an editor in New York and Washington, and a reporter/producer for Reuters Financial Television (RFTV) in Washington. She covered the White House, Capitol Hill and the United States Department of the Treasury. From 1990 to 1993, Arraf was Reuters Bureau Chief in Jordan. She has covered Iraq since 1991.

Arraf joined CNN in 1998 as Baghdad Bureau Chief. After the Gulf War, she was the only Western correspondent in Iraq for several years. There she covered the war, the first elections after the war, the crisis, sanctions and the explosion at the United Nations headquarters. In 2001, she moved to Istanbul, Turkey, where she became bureau chief for CNN. In 2002, she returned to Baghdad and covered protests by families who demanded information about their missing sons. In the fall of 2002, the Iraqi government expelled her from the country. Arraf returned to Turkey, and after the end of large-scale hostilities, she again headed the CNN bureau in Baghdad. In 2004, she became Senior Baghdad Correspondent.

In 2016, Arraf joined NPR. Prior to NPR, she worked for NBC, PBS NewsHour and Al Jazeera English. She was also a correspondent for The Christian Science Monitor. In 2020, she joined The New York Times as Baghdad bureau chief. She was fired from the Times in 2023 amid an investigation by the paper into whether she overpaid Iraqi journalists and after raising safety and legal issues with the newspaper.
