= Billy Golfus =

Billy Golfus is an activist for disabled people in the United States. He is renowned for his documentary When Billy Broke His Head... and Other Tales of Wonder which was released in 1994. It won numerous awards including an Emmy nomination and a Sundance Festival award. Although he has had plans to make more films, none have yet surfaced.

== Sources ==
- Robson, Britt. "Broken-Headed Man Busts Butt, Nuts." City Pages 27.1336.July 12, 2006 Jan. 25.2007 .
