= Roberta Baskin =

American journalist and nonprofit director

- Born: Atlanta, Georgia
- Education: High School of Performing Arts, Elmira College, Harvard University
- Occupations: Investigative journalist, Nonprofit director
- Notable credit(s): NOW with Bill Moyers; 20/20; 48 Hours
- Parent(s): Alan Baskin and Suzanne Pallister

Roberta Baskin is an American journalist and nonprofit director. She co-founded and served as Executive Director of the AIM2Flourish global learning initiative, hosted at Fowler Center for Business as an Agent of World Benefit at the Weatherhead School of Management at Case Western Reserve University in Cleveland, Ohio.

== Early life and education ==
Baskin grew up in Manhattan's Greenwich Village. She attended New York's High School of Performing Arts, graduating in 1969. She later attended Elmira College.

== Career ==
Baskin began her career as an investigative reporter in Chicago. She was the senior Washington correspondent for NOW with Bill Moyers, senior investigative producer for the ABC newsmagazine 20/20, chief investigative correspondent for the CBS newsmagazine 48 Hours, and contributed special reports to the CBS Evening News. Later, she was the Director of the Investigative Team at WJLA-TV in Washington, D.C. until early 2009.

She also served as Executive Director for the Center for Public Integrity, and as the Director of Media Communications for the Office of the Inspector General at the United States Department of Health and Human Services.

Baskin is active in journalism organizations and has been a guest lecturer internationally. She served on the board of directors of the Fund for Investigative Journalism for thirteen years, was elected to a term on the Board of Directors for Investigative Reporters and Editors, and has served on the Nieman Fellows Selection Committee and the Executive Committee of the Nieman Foundation's Advisory Board,

Baskin has won more than 75 journalism prizes, including three duPont-Columbia University Awards, two George Foster Peabody Awards, the Investigative Reporters and Editors Award, the Radio-Television News Directors Edward R. Murrow Award, the Joe A. Callaway Award for Civic Courage, and numerous Emmy Awards, including the Ted Yates Emmy Award for Outstanding Service to the Community.

Baskin has been honored with a Nieman Fellowship at Harvard University, and an Ethics Fellowship at the Poynter Institute.
