= Alvin H. Perlmutter =

American film producer

Alvin H. Perlmutter, Executive Director of The Independent Production Fund, has produced television programming for over thirty years. Perlmutter’s television programs have aired on PBS, the commercial networks and cable in this country and have also been broadcast throughout Europe and the Far East.

Prior to forming his own company, Perlmutter was NBC News Vice President where he was responsible for all network documentaries and news magazine programs and earlier as Director of Public Affairs Programming and Program Manager of WNBC-TV, New York.

He has been the recipient of six national prime-time Emmys, the Peabody Award and five Ace Awards for excellence in programming on cable television.

He was executive producer of the public affairs magazine series, The Great American Dream Machine (PBS), and he was also the co-executive producer of Joseph Campbell and the Power of Myth with Bill Moyers (PBS). His more recent productions include Muslims, a two-hour Frontline special, God and Government, also for public television, and IPF’s latest documentary, Beyond Borders: Undocumented Mexican Americans.

== Personal life ==
Perlmutter graduated from Syracuse University. He is a son ofJennie and Fred Perlmutter.

In 1994, he married Joan Konner, dean of the Columbia University Graduate School of Journalism. Konner and Perlmutter co-produced the documentaries Joseph Campbell and the Power of Myth with Bill Moyers, She Says: Women in News, and The Mystery of Love.
