= Mark Phillips (journalist) =

Canadian television journalist

Mark Phillips is a Canadian television journalist, and currently, the Senior Foreign Correspondent, based in London (for more than 2 decades), working for CBS News.

== Early years and education ==
Phillips was born in Montreal, Quebec, Canada, in 1948. He graduated from McGill University in 1970 with a degree in social sciences and humanities. In the early 1970s, Phillips also attended Graduate School of Public Communications at Boston University.

== CBC News ==
Phillips began his television journalism career, in the mid-1970s, by joining CBC News beginning as the parliamentary correspondent in Ottawa. In the late 1970s, Phillips moved up to the position of reporter, based in the network's London bureau.

== CBS News ==
After leaving CBC News in 1982, Phillips moved to the United States, and joined CBS News as a reporter for the network's London bureau and covered events throughout Europe, the Middle East and Africa. That same year, Phillips became the 1st non-British correspondent to report from the Falkland Islands during the British military's conflict in Argentina.

From 1984 to 1986, Phillips was promoted to correspondent and assigned to the CBS News bureau in Moscow, where he covered 3 Soviet leaders: Yuri Andropov, Konstainin Chernenko and Mikhail Gorbachev—as well as the Reagan-Gorbachev summit in Moscow and the resumption of the U.S.-Soviet arms talk.

From 1986 to 1988, Phillips was assigned to the CBS News bureau in Rome, where he covered the Vatican and Pope John Paul II, the Iran-Iraq war and the war in Afghanistan, among many other stories.

From 1988 to 1993, Phillips became correspondent based in the CBS News bureau in Washington, where he covered American politics, the investigation into the 1988 bombing of Pan Am Flight 103 over Lockerbie, Scotland, the United Airlines crash in Sioux City, the Eastern Airlines strike, and then reported from the State Department during the Persian Gulf War in 1991.

In 1993, Phillips did return to the CBS News bureau in London, where he covered many major stories which continues today, including the war in the Balkans, the death of Princess Diana, and the weapons inspection conflicts in Iraq.

His work has been recognized over time through multiple EMMY awards, along with others, including the 2014 Edward R. Murrow Award from the Radio-Television News Directors Association as well as a citation from the Society of Environmental Journalists for his work on climate change.

== Personal life ==
Phillips currently lives in London, England, with his wife and four children.
