= William Cran =

Australian-born English-Canadian documentary filmmaker (1945–2025)

- Born: 11 December 1945; Hobart, Tasmania, Australia
- Died: 4 June 2025 (aged 79); Isleworth, England
- Education: Magdalen College
- Occupation: Documentary filmmaker
- Spouse(s): Araminta Wordsworth (divorced) Stephanie Tepper (died. 1997) Polly Bide (died. 2003) Vicki Barker (m. 2014)

William Cran (11 December 1945 – 4 June 2025) was an Australian-born English-Canadian documentary filmmaker.

== Life and career ==
Cran was born in Hobart, the son of John Cran, a science lecturer, and Jean Holliday, a teacher. At the age of six, he and his family emigrated to England with his parents, settling in London. He attended Magdalen College, graduating in 1968. After graduating, he worked as a trainee for the BBC. Over the years, he rose to the role as producer; receiving his first producing credit, in 1974, in an episode of the current affairs documentary programme Panorama.

In 1976, Cran emigrated to Canada, settling in Toronto, Ontario. After emigrating, he worked as a senior producer for the CBC investigative documentary series The Fifth Estate. In 1978, he emigrated to the United States, settling in Boston, Massachusetts, when filmmaker and journalist David Fanning reached out to Cran about his new investigative documentary program World, later renamed to Frontline, in 1983, directing two documentaries of the series's first season.

During his years as a documentary filmmaker, Cran directed, produced and wrote for numerous documentaries such as Praise the Lord, The Story of English, The Secret Life of J. Edgar Hoover, Cuba and Cocaine, From Jesus to Christ, The Commanding Heights, Jihad: The Men and Ideas Behind Al Qaeda, The Prize. Who's Afraid of Rupert Murdoch and The Godfather of Cocaine.

Cran retired from documentary filmmaking in 2014, last directing for the documentary film Lockerbie: What Really Happened?.

== Personal life and death ==
Cran was married four times. He was first married to Araminta Wordsworth, but their marriage ended in divorce. He was then married to Stephanie Tepper, a film editor. They had three daughters. His second wife Tepper died in 1997. After the death of his second wife, he married Polly Bide, a documentary filmmaker. His third wife Bide died in 2003, which after the death of his third wife, he married Vicki Barker, a CBS Radio journalist in 2014. His fourth marriage lasted until his death in 2025.

Cran died of Parkinson's disease at a hospital in Isleworth, on 4 June 2025, at the age of 79.
