= Philip Bennett (Washington Post) =

American newspaper editor

- Born: San Francisco, California, U.S.
- Occupation: Journalist

Academic background
- Education: Harvard University

Academic work
- Discipline: Journalism and public policy
- Institutions: Duke University

Philip Bennett is an American journalist who has been a foreign correspondent, managing editor of The Washington Post, and a documentary film producer for the PBS series Frontline.

Bennett began his career at The Lima Times in Peru before joining the staffs of The Boston Globe (1984–1997) and The Washington Post (1997–2009). He was managing editor at The Post from 2005 to 2009, a period during which the newspaper won 10 Pulitzer Prizes. He was previously deputy national editor of national security, defense and foreign policy coverage, and assistant managing editor for foreign news at The Post. At The Boston Globe, he was a foreign correspondent, metropolitan reporter, assistant editor of Metro news, and finally foreign editor.

Between 2011-2013, Bennett was the managing editor of Frontline on PBS. Since 2016 he has co-produced 20 documentaries for the series, including Trump's Power and the Rule of Law (2025), America After 9/11 (2021), Putin's Revenge (2017), and The Choice 2016, which won an Emmy award. His work has appeared in the Atlantic, Spain's El Pais, and other publications. In 2023 he was a New America (ASU Future Security) Fellow.

Between 2009-2020, he was the Eugene C. Patterson Professor of journalism and public policy at Duke University, where he was director of the DeWitt Wallace Center for Media and Democracy.

Bennett and Steve Fainaru are co-authors of The Last Correspondent: Anthony Shadid and the Search for Meaning in the Ruins of War, scheduled for publication by Celadon Books in April, 2027. The biography examines the life of the Pulitzer Prize winning foreign correspondent, a former colleague of Bennett's and Fainaru, who died in Syria in 2012.

== Early life and family ==
A native of the San Francisco area, Bennett is a Harvard University graduate who describes his outlook this way: "I love newspapers and the people who make them." He has been described by other journalists as “a low-key man with a studious air.” Bennett was married to Mónica Klien Samanez, a Peruvian-born scholar who taught Latin American literature at Georgetown University and Wellesley College. She died from complications of ovarian cancer in 2020.

== Academia ==
According to POLITICO, in 2008, "Bennett was up for the Post's executive editor job before the top spot went to Marcus Brauchli. However, Bennett remained for several months in the number two position to smooth the transition, before eventually stepping down in January." After stepping down, Bennett was on the short list for J-School dean at UC Berkeley before being appointed Eugene C. Patterson Professor of Journalism and Public Policy at Duke University in 2009.

Reacting to his appointment, Bennett said in a statement: "Now that the news media face unprecedented trials and possibilities, Duke is an ideal place to explore journalism’s next frontier, especially journalism that serves the public interest. I’m thrilled by the opportunity to do this as part of the Duke faculty." According to Duke University, "The Patterson Chair is named in honor of the former editor-in-chief and chief executive officer of The St. Petersburg Times, whose earlier work as editor of the Atlanta Constitution set a benchmark for coverage of the civil rights movement. Patterson also served three years as managing editor at The Washington Post and taught for a year at Duke. [...] The chair, endowed by a gift from the Poynter Fund, has been occupied since 1998 by former Time magazine writer and editor Susan Tifft, who is stepping down at the end of this academic year." In 2013 he was named director of the DeWitt Wallace Center for Media and Democracy at Duke University, a position he will hold until the end of his two-year appointment on July 1, 2015. Speaking about his plans in this new role, Bennett said: “One leading challenge for journalists is to make sense of an expanding universe of available data and to put it in the service of more accurate and thorough reporting, and rich storytelling, [...] Universities can help experiment and create in ways that have become more difficult for the news industry.” Bennett works closely with Bill Adair, the Knight Chair for Computational Journalism at Duke University, who was appointed in 2013.
