= Gerald Loeb Award winners for Audio and Video =

American journalism award

The Gerald Loeb Award is given annually for multiple categories of business reporting. The "Video/Audio" category replaced "Broadcast" in 2014 and 2015. It was split into separate "Audio" and "Video" categories beginning in 2016.

== Gerald Loeb Award winners for Video/Audio (2014–2015) ==
- 2014: "Under the Hood: The AAMCO Investigation," by Tisha Thompson, Rick Yarborough, Jeff Piper, and Mike Goldrick, WRC-TV
- 2015: "Inside Sysco: Exposing North America’s Food Sheds" by Vicky Nguyen, Kevin Nious, Jeremy Carroll, Felipe Escamilla, David Paredes, Julie Putnam and Mark Villarreal, KNTV

Videos in Series:
1. "Raw Meat Found in Unrefrigerated Storage Sheds", July 9, 2013
2. "Sysco Corporation Facing Fines for Storing Food in Outdoor Sheds", July 10, 2013
3. "Food in Dirty Sheds Served to Bay Area Restaurants", July 16, 2013
4. "Sysco Regrets Storing Food in Sheds Throughout US and Canada", September 6, 2013
5. "Sysco Employees: Food Sheds Used Throughout U.S., Canada", September 10, 2013
6. "Food Giant Sysco Under USDA Investigation", September 30, 2013
7. "Records Show Sysco Drivers Dangerously Over Hours", November 27, 2013
8. "Timeline: NBC Bay Area Investigation Into Sysco Corporation and Food Safety", November 27, 2013
9. "FDA Unveils Plan to Bring New Oversight of Food Distribution", January 31, 2014
10. "Sysco Fined Millions for Food Safety Violations", July 17, 2014

== Gerald Loeb Award winners for Audio (2016–present) ==
- 2016: "Your Money and Your Life" by Chris Arnold, Uri Berliner, Neal Carruth, Lori Todd, John Ydstie, Heidi Glenn, Ariel Zambelich, Avie Schneider, Alyson Hurt and Annette Elizabeth Allen, NPR
- 2017: "Dov Charney’s American Dream" by Lisa Chow, Kaitlin Roberts, Molly Messick, Bruce Wallace, Luke Malone, Simone Polanen, Alex Blumberg and Alexandra Johnes for Gimlet Media

Stories in Series:
1. "Part 3: Photos", November 18, 2016
2. "Part 4: Boundaries", December 2, 2016
3. "Part 5: Suits", December 8, 2016
4. "Part 6: Anger", December 16, 2016
5. "Part 7: MAGIC", December 22, 2016

- 2018: "Robot-Proof Jobs" by David Brancaccio, Katie Long, Nicole Childers, Ben Tolliday, Daniel Ramirez, and Paulina Velasco for Marketplace
- 2019: "Medicaid, Under the Influence" by Liz Essley White, Joe Yerardi and Alison Fitzgerald Kodjak, The Center for Public Integrity and NPR

Stories in Series:
1. Investigation: Patients' Drug Options Under Medicaid Heavily Influenced By Drugmakers, July 18, 2018
2. How Drug Companies Control How Their Drugs Are Covered By Medicaid, July 18, 2018
3. Louisiana's New Approach To Treating Hepatitis C, July 19, 2018

- 2020: "Amazon: Behind the Smiles" by Will Evans, Katharine Mieszkowski, Taki Telonidis, Rachel de Leon, Kevin Sullivan, Najib Aminy, Andrew Donohue, Esther Kaplan, Matt Thompson, John Barth, Al Letson, Melissa Lewis, Hannah Young, Byard Duncan, David Rodriguez, Mwende Hinojosa, Jim Briggs, Fernando Arruda, and Reveal staff, Reveal from the Center for Investigative Reporting and PRX
- 2021: "American Rehab" by Shoshona Walter, Laura Starecheski, Ike Sriskandarajah, Brett Myers, Kevin Sullivan, Jim Briggs, Fernando Arruda, Katharine Mieszkowski, Najib Aminy, Rosemarie Ho, Al Letson, Amy Julia Harris, Amy Mostafa, Matt Thompson, Esther Kaplan, Andy Donohue, Amanda Pike, Narda Zacchino, Gabe Hongsdusit, Sarah Mirk, Claire Mullen, Byard Duncan, David Rodriguez, Eren K. Wilson, and Hannah Young, Reveal from the Center for Investigative Reporting and PRX

Stories in Series:
1. "A Desperate Call"
2. "Miracle on The Beach"
3. "A Venomous Snake"
4. "Cowboy Conman"
5. "Reagan with The Snap"
6. "The White Vans"
7. "The Work Cure"
8. "Shadow Workforce"

- 2022: - "'We're Coming for You': For Public Health Officials, a Year of Threats and Menace" by Anna Maria Barry-Jester and Miki Meek, Kaiser Health News and This American Life
- 2023 (tie): "In Trust" by Rachel Adams-Heard, Allison Herrera (Salinan), Davis Land, Jeff Grocott, Samantha Storey, and Victor Yvellez, Bloomberg and iHeart Radio

Stories in Series:
1. "The List", September 6, 2022
2. "The Headright", September 6, 2022
3. "The Osage Price", September 13, 2022
4. "The Guardianship", September 20, 2022
5. "The Association", September 27, 2022
6. "The Middlewoman", October 4, 2022
7. "The Rance Bid", October 11, 2022
8. "The Pivot", October 18, 2022

- 2023 (tie): "Who Killed Daphne?" by Stephen Grey, Jacob Borg, Russell Finch, Nikka Singh, and the Wondery Miniseries Team, Reuters, Times of Malta, and Wondery

Stories in Series:
1. "Now I'm Really Going", July 11, 2022
2. "The Rats Nest", July 11, 2022
3. "The Witch", July 18, 2022
4. "Omerta", July 25, 2022
5. "The Middleman", August 1, 2022
6. "Everything Will Collapse", August 8, 2022
7. "Slow-Moving Train Crash", August 15, 2022
8. "See You All In Hell", October 21, 2022

== Gerald Loeb Award winners for Video (2016–present) ==
- 2016: "Joanna Stern's Videos," by Joanna Stern and Drew Evans for The Wall Street Journal
- 2017: "Cosecha de Miseria (Harvest of Misery) & The Source" by Greg Gilderman, Marisa Venegas, Neil Katz, Solly Granatstein, Shawn Efran, Marcus Stern, Brandon Kieffer, John Carlos Frey, Mónica Villamizar and Manuel Iglesias Perez for Telemundo Network and Weather.com/The Weather Channel

Videos:
1. "Cosecha de Miseria (Harvest of Misery)", December 19, 2016
2. "The Source", January 19, 2017

- 2018: "Future of Money" by Chris Buck, Kyra Darnton, Solana Pyne, Laurence B. Chollet, Karen M. Sughrue, Erik German, Maria Villaseñor, Noah Madoff, and Jeff Bernier for Retro Report and Quartz
- 2019: "Blackout in Puerto Rico" by Rick Young, Laura Sullivan, Emma Schwartz, Fritz Kramer and Kate McCormick, Frontline, PBS, and NPR

Stories in Series:
1. Blackout in Puerto Rico, April 18, 2018
2. How FEMA Failed To Help Victims Of Hurricanes in Puerto Rico Recover, May 1, 2018
3. How Puerto Rico's Debt Created A Perfect Storm Before The Storm, May 2, 2018

- 2020: "'Zone Rouge': An Army of Children Toils in African Mines" by Cynthia McFadden, Christine Romo, Lisa Cavazuti, Bill Angelucci, and Daniel Nagin, NBC News Investigative Unit
- 2021: "Opioids, Inc." by Thomas Jennings, Annie Wong, Nick Verbitsky, Hannah Kuchler, Rebecca Blandón, Anna Auster, and Shaunagh Connaire, Frontline and Financial Times

Stories in Series:
1. "Opioids, Bribery And Wall Street: The Inside Story Of A Disgraced Drugmaker", June 18, 2020
2. "Opioids, Ic.", June 23, 2020
3. "Insys Executives Are Sentenced to Prison Time, Putting Opioid Makers On Notice", June 23, 2020

- 2022: "Framing Britney Spears" by Liz Day and Samantha Stark, The New York Times, FX, and Hulu

Documentaries:
- "Framing Britney Spears"
- "Controlling Britney Spears"

- 2023: "How Russia Stole Ukraine's Grain" by Emma Scott, Costas Paris, Jane Lytvynenko, Alistair MacDonald, Lisa Schwartz, Till Daldrup, Avani Yadav, Robert Libetti, Christopher S. Stewart, and Ben Weltman, The Wall Street Journal
