= Tina Antolini =

American journalist and radio producer

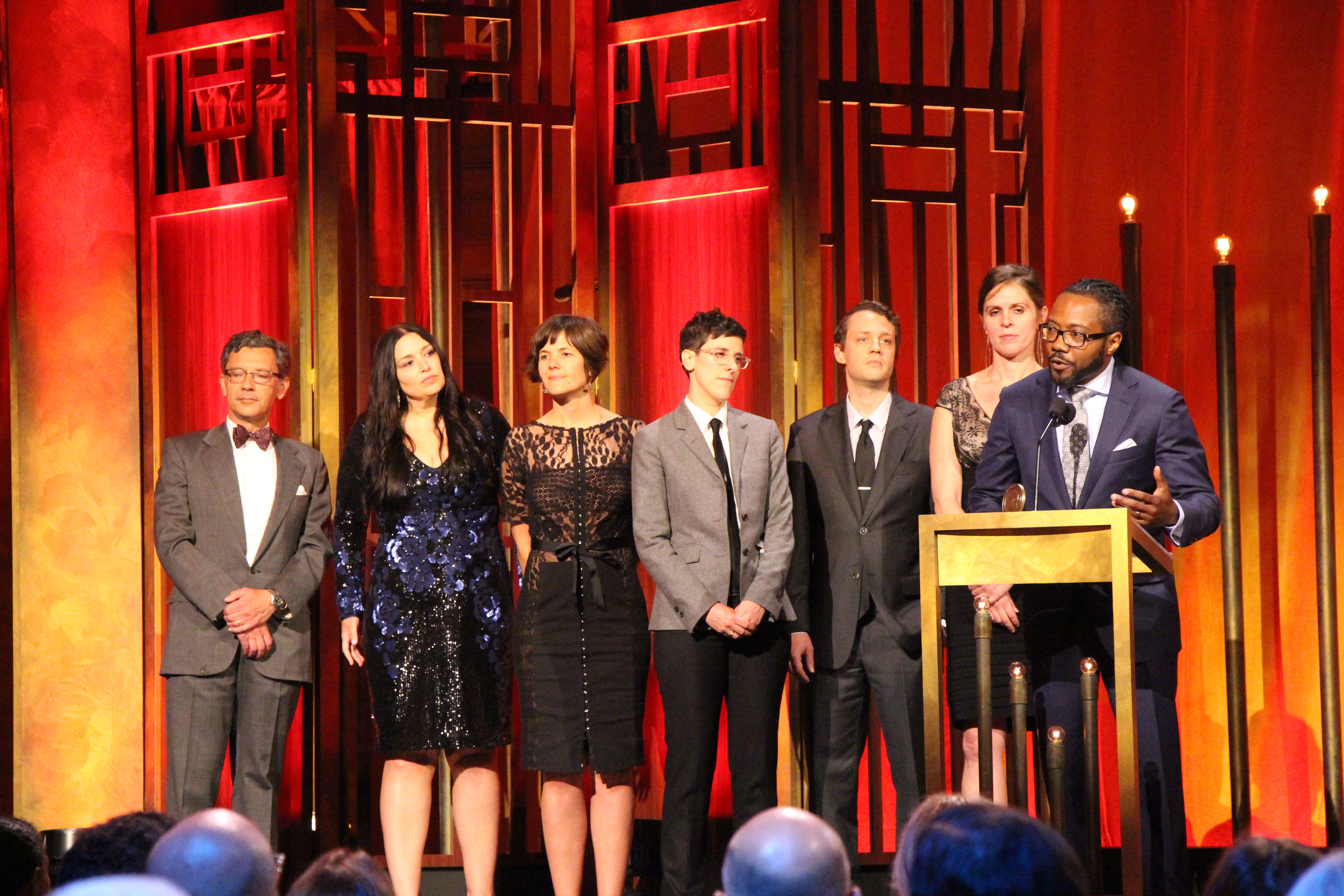
- Al Letson accepts the Peabody for State of the Re:Union. He is joined on stage by Taki Telonidis, Brie Burge, Delaney Hall, Laura Starcheski, Ian DeSousa and Tina Antolini
- Born: Christina Antolini; Maine, US
- Education: Stanford University; Hampshire College; Salt Institute for Documentary Studies
- Occupations: Journalist, radio producer
- Parents: Anthony F. Antolini (father); Holly Lyman Antolini (mother)
- Relatives: Richard Lyman (grandfather)
- Website: www.tinaantolini.com

Christina Antolini, better known as Tina Antolini, is an American journalist and radio producer. She has worked with National Public Radio, where she produced on their State of the Re:Union program; Southern Foodways Alliance, where she produced and hosted the Gravy podcast; and with Pop-Up Magazine, a live show event where she was a story producer.

== Early life and education ==
Antolini grew up in Maine. She attended Stanford University, and in 2001, she transferred to Hampshire College in Massachusetts. Her original interest was "jazz vocals" but she switched to Ethnomusicology when she discovered that she preferred writing about music to performing it. She also took a break from school to intern with Smithsonian Folkways and to attend the Salt Institute for Documentary Studies in Portland, Maine. She graduated from Hampshire in 2004.

== Career ==
Antolini has worked for institutions such as National Public Radio (NPR), and New England Public Radio (NEPR). Antolini has also written articles on a diverse range of topics, including transgender rights, and cooking pickleweed.

Antolini became one of the first producers of State of the Re:Union (SOTRU) in 2009, which is distributed by NPR and aired nationally in the United States. The show went onto win multiple awards, including the Peabody Award in 2014.

She started to produce the Gravy podcast in collaboration with Southern Foodways Alliance in 2014, which along with its associated magazine, looks at South American food culture. Antolini has won several awards for her work on Gravy, and it was said to be one of "The Year’s Best Under-the-Radar Podcasts" in 2015 in the Mother Jones magazine

As part of her 2015 UC Berkeley fellowship she produced a radio documentary titled "Fighting for the Promised Land: A Story of Farming and Racism", which was then featured by the Third Coast International Audio Festival.

In 2017, she joined Pop-Up Magazine as a senior story producer and co-host, which consists of stories presented to a live audience, and not recorded for future viewing.

In 2018, Antolini published a book with Israeli American chef Alon Shaya called Shaya: An Odyssey of Food, My Journey Back to Israel. It was said to be a "a must-read book for up-and-coming chefs" in Publishers Weekly, and "a cookbook worth slowing down for" by Brooklyn Based.

In 2020 she wrote articles on topics including as Maori Activists, and a review of a book concerning intimacy after grief.

== Personal life ==
Antolini is the daughter of Holly Lyman Antolini, who served as a rector at St. James Episcopal Church, Cambridge, Massachusetts. and Anthony F. Antolini, an academic in Slavic linguistics and a choir director at Bowdoin College. She is the granddaughter of Richard Lyman, a professor and former president at Stanford University.

Antolini lived in New Orleans while she was producing and hosting Gravy, and now resides in Oakland, California. She had a child 1 July 2021.

== Awards and commendations ==
- Associated Press Award for Investigative Reporting, WFCR, for “Voices of the Transgender Community of Western New England”, 2007
- Gracie Award Outstanding Series for “Voices of the Transgender Community of Western New England”, 2009
- UC Berkeley Graduate School of Journalism Food Fellow, 2015
- James Beard Foundation’s Broadcast Media Award for Gravy podcast, 2015, 2016
- Livingston Award finalist, National Reporting, for Gravy Podcast, 2017
