= Iqbal Wahhab =

Bangladeshi-born British businessman (born 1963)

Iqbal Wahhab OBE
- ইকবাল ওয়াহাব
- Born: 22 August 1963 (age 62); East Pakistan
- Education: Business Administration
- Alma mater: London School of Economics
- Occupation: Businessman
- Years active: 1991–present
- Notable work: Tandoori Magazine; Cinnamon Club; Roast
- Style: Indian Cuisine
- Website: iqbalwahhab.com

Iqbal Wahhab (Bengali: ইকবাল ওয়াহাব; born 22 August 1963) is a Bangladeshi-born British businessman. He is the founder of Tandoori Magazine, and restaurants The Cinnamon Club and Roast.

== Background and career ==
Wahhab was born in East Pakistan, (now Bangladesh) and arrived in the United Kingdom at the age of eight months. He was educated in London and is a graduate of the London School of Economics.

After working as a journalist in the national press for three years, in 1991 he set up his own PR firm which specialised in food, drink and restaurants and then in 1994 he launched Tandoori Magazine.

In 2001, Wahhab sold out of the magazine to launch The Cinnamon Club, an Indian restaurant and bar aimed at changing the way the British view Indian dining. The opening of it was troublesome but it became at the time the world's most successful Indian restaurant in terms of revenue. In 2003, he co-authored The Cinnamon Club Cookbook with Chef Vivek Singh and in 2005 opened Roast, a restaurant in Borough Market presenting traditional British food with an emphasis on "using the best of British seasonal produce".

From 2012, Wahhab became chair of the Department for Work and Pensions' Ethnic Minority Advisory Group, set up to discuss ways to reduce ethnic minority unemployment levels; he sat on a task force with six ministers to formulate policies to this end. In 2012, he was invited to Gordon Ramsay's Bad Boys Bakery lunch at Brixton Prison. He is patron of a social enterprise set up at Pentonville Prison, Liberty Kitchen.

From 2018 to 2021 he was chairman of the EQUAL advisory group that aims to address race inequality in the UK criminal justice system.

== Awards and recognition ==
In 2009, Wahhab was appointed an Officer of the Order of the British Empire (OBE) in the 2009 New Year Honours for his public service and services to the hospitality industry. In 2010, he was made a Fellow of the Royal Society of the Arts. In 2019 he was made High Sheriff of Greater London.

== See also ==
- British Bangladeshi
- Business of British Bangladeshis
- List of British Bangladeshis
