= The Clink (restaurant) =

Restaurant in the UK

The Clink Restaurants
- The first Clink Restaurant opened at HMP High Down.

Restaurant information
- Established: 11 May 2009
- Chef: Alberto Crisci
- Food type: European cuisine
- Location: HM Prison High Down, Banstead, Surrey, SM2 5PJ
- Coordinates: 51.3355°N 0.1897°W
- Other locations: The Clink Brixton (London), The Clink Cardiff (Wales) and The Clink Styal (Wilmslow)
- Website: www.theclinkcharity.org

The Clink Restaurant concept was founded by Alberto Crisci in 2009 and are a major part of The Clink Charity's prisoner rehabilitation initiatives. The charity aims to break the cycle of crime by changing attitudes, creating second chances and reducing reoffending rates.

Each prisoner who works in a Clink Restaurant studies for accredited NVQs in food preparation, food service and cleaning, and horticulture. Whilst working in a Clink Restaurant prisoners gain experience within an operational business and receive in-depth guidance to find full-time employment within the hospitality industry upon release.

As of 2025, there is only one Clink Restaurant in operation located at HMP Brixton.

In December 2022, The Clink Restaurant HMP Cardiff closed down due to the conclusion of their lease.

== Description ==
The organisation takes its name from "clink", a slang generic term for prison or a jail cell, which in turn is derived from The Clink, a historic prison in Southwark.

The first Clink Restaurant opened in 2009 at HMP High Down in Surrey, when Alberto Crisci, then catering manager, identified the need for formal training, qualifications and support for prisoners in finding a job after release.

In 2010, Christopher Moore was appointed the charity's first CEO.

The Clink Restaurants are registered catering colleges regulated by OFSTED, who gave 'outstanding' reports following visits to High Down (2012 / 2015) and Brixton (2015).

Giles Coren, columnist and restaurant critic for The Times visited the Brixton restaurant and wrote: "The Clink is doing great things for prisons, people, local communities and the reputation of Britain’s catering industry, and I salute it unreservedly."

== The Clink's Five Step Programme ==
The Clink's Five Step Programme – Recruit, Train, Support, Employ and Mentor – aims to dramatically reduce the reoffending rate of those who have completed the training programme.

Prisoners with six to 18 months of their sentence left to serve are recruited for the programme and receive full-time training in order to reach the required level to succeed in the hospitality industry upon release.

Whilst the food tries to offer a contemporary twist on traditional British cuisine, with each menu being designed around locally sourced and seasonal ingredients, the restaurants also intend to provide an educational insight into the positive effect of rehabilitation and helps change public perceptions of prisoners.

== The Clink Restaurant at HMP High Down ==
The Clink Restaurant at HMP High Down was officially opened in 2009, as the first public restaurant to open within a UK prison. Sitting within the walls of the category B prison, the restaurant seats 94 diners whilst also offering a private dining room for exclusive hire which seats 20. A projector and AV facilities are also available for meetings, conferences and presentations.

Up to 30 prisoners at a time work a 40-hour week, training towards gaining nationally recognised City & Guilds NVQs in food preparation and food and beverage service, before returning to their cells in the evening.

Sheila Dillon visited High Down in 2009 to record an episode of BBC Radio 4's The Food Programme reporting on the new restaurant.

== The Clink Restaurant at HMP Cardiff ==
The restaurant opened in 2012 and is within the grounds (but outside the walls) of HMP Cardiff, a category B prison. It seats 90.

The Clink building was originally built as the visitor check-in centre for friends and family visiting prisoners at HMP Cardiff and was also used as a staff mess, but had been left vacant for a few years before The Clink Charity were granted use of it. The Clink Charity took possession of the building in January 2012 and spent eight months converting it into The Clink Restaurant, adding an outdoor seating area and an open plan kitchen.

30 category D prisoners from HMP Prescoed, Usk, traveled there each morning to gain City & Guilds NVQs in food preparation and food and beverage service, before returning to the prison at the end of the working day.

The Clink closed in September 2022 when the lease on the building expired.

== The Clink Restaurant at HMP Brixton ==
The Clink Restaurant at HMP Brixton opened in February 2014 as the third restaurant operated by The Clink Charity in the UK. The restaurant sits within the walls of HMP Brixton, a category C prison, and seats 120 diners. It is located within the old Governor's House, built in 1819.

Because of its location, no metal cutlery is used, or alcohol served. Customers are required to pass security-checks.

The restaurant also offers five private dining rooms available for hire, as well as conference facilities.

In 2019 a survey by Justice Data Lab found that re-offending rates for those trained in the Brixton restaurant were only 11%, in comparison with 32% for prisoners not involved in the project.

== The Clink Restaurant at HMP Styal ==
The Clink Restaurant at HMP Styal sits within the grounds of the women's prison and seats 120 diners. The Clink Charity, in partnership with HMPS, converted the disused St Andrews chapel that was built in 1915 into The Clink restaurant. The chapel was used by prisoners for weekly services until it became just a storage area. In April 2015 the restaurant officially opened its doors to the public.

== Clink Events ==
Clink Events launched in 2014 to offer external catering services for private cocktail parties and receptions. Food is prepared by prisoners in training, before being delivered in refrigerated vehicles to the event venue.

== The Clink Cafe ==
The Clink Cafe opened in May 2018 as the first project off prison grounds for the charity. The cafe is set in a Grade II listed building called Canada House, owned by Kinrise, on Chepstow Street in the heart of Manchester's city centre.

== See also ==
- Liberty Kitchen, a social enterprise based at Pentonville Prison
- Rehabilitation (penology)
- Social integration
- CulinaryCorps, an American organisation of cooking and philanthropy
