= Liberty Kitchen =

Social enterprise at HM Prison Pentonville

Liberty Kitchen is a social enterprise based at HM Prison Pentonville, London. It exists to train prisoners in high-quality food preparation, and to employ ex-prisoners to sell this food at street markets. Its intention is to open up opportunities to the men, including qualifications and the possibility of self-employment, and thus reduce recidivism.

Liberty Kitchen launched in 2016. Seed funding was provided by, among others, the Royal Society of Arts and the Drapers' Company, one of the ancient livery companies of the City of London. Its board is chaired by Lord Falconer, and also includes Edward Faulks, Baron Faulks QC and the editor of Delicious, Karen Barnes. Its patrons are Iqbal Wahhab and Gina Moffat, and its founder-director is Janet Boston.

Liberty Kitchen offers prisoners a 12-week programme leading to an NVQ (National Vocational Qualification) in enterprise. The menu is centred on creative reinterpretations of meatballs, drawing on the prisoners' backgrounds for culinary ideas and London places for names. For example, the "Ball No Chain" range (referring to the idiom Ball and chain) includes a vegetarian ball made of broad beans, named Green Lanes after the Turkish area of North London. Liberty Kitchen was singled out for positive mention in the 2018 report of the Independent Monitoring Board, whose job it is to monitor the welfare of prisoners.

It won "Best Streetfood/Takeaway" at the 2019 BBC Food and Farming Awards and so was featured on BBC Radio 4 The Food Programme. In addition to street food, Liberty Kitchen caters for events; one company hired them for a staff lunch, describing this as a form of corporate social responsibility.

== See also ==
- Rehabilitation (penology)
- Social integration
- CulinaryCorps, an American organisation of cooking and philanthropy
- The Clink (restaurant), another British prison rehabilitation scheme
