= Edward Faulks, Baron Faulks =

English barrister and Queen's Counsel

The Right Honourable The Lord Faulks KC
- Official portrait, 2019

Minister of State for Civil Justice and Legal Policy
- In office 20 January 2014 – 19 July 2016
- Prime Minister: David Cameron
- Preceded by: The Lord McNally
- Succeeded by: Lord Keen of Elie (as Justice spokesperson in the House of Lords)

Member of the House of Lords
- Lord Temporal
- Life peerage 21 July 2010

Personal details
- Born: Edward Peter Lawless Faulks; 19 August 1950 (age 76)
- Party: Non-affiliated (since 2019)
- Other political affiliations: Conservative (until 2019)
- Spouse: Catherine Frances Turner
- Children: 2
- Relatives: Sebastian Faulks (brother); Sir Neville Faulks (uncle)
- Occupation: Barrister

Edward Peter Lawless Faulks, Baron Faulks, KC (born 19 August 1950), is an English barrister and unaffiliated life peer who is the current Chairman of the Independent Press Standards Organisation (IPSO). Formerly a Conservative peer, he was Minister of State for Justice between December 2013 and July 2016.

== Background and education ==
Faulks is the son of Peter Ronald Faulks MC, a circuit judge, and Pamela Faulks (née Lawless). The novelist Sebastian Faulks is his younger brother. His uncle was Sir Neville Faulks, a High Court judge.

He was educated at Wellington College and Jesus College, Oxford, where he graduated with an MA and of which he is an honorary fellow.

== Career ==
Faulks was called to the Bar by the Middle Temple in 1973. He became a Queen's Counsel in 1996, an Assistant Recorder in 1996, and a Recorder in 2000. He became a Bencher of the Middle Temple in 2002.

Faulks was chairman of the Professional Negligence Bar Association from 2002 to 2004, special adviser to the Department for Constitutional Affairs on compensation culture from 2005 to 2006, and head of research for the Society of Conservative Lawyers from 2010 to 2012. He is a member of the Chartered Institute of Arbitrators. He was a literary agent at Curtis Brown from 1980 to 1981.

In 2010 he was created a life peer as Baron Faulks, of Donnington in the Royal County of Berkshire. In December 2013 it was announced that with effect from 20 January 2014 Faulks would become a Minister of State at the Ministry of Justice. He served in this role until July 2016, when he resigned from the government in protest against the appointment of Liz Truss as Secretary of State for Justice and Lord Chancellor by new prime minister Theresa May.

Lord Faulks was appointed a Justice at the Astana International Financial Centre Court in Astana, Kazakhstan, in 2018.

Since January 2020, he has been Chairman of the Independent Press Standards Organisation, the independent regulator of the majority of newspapers and magazines in the UK.

In July 2020, Faulks was appointed chairman of the Independent Review of Administrative Law. The panel submitted its report in January 2021.

== Other activities ==
Faulks is a contributing editor to Local Authority Liabilities, 1998, 4th edition 2009. He is on the board of the social enterprise Liberty Kitchen, set up to reduce recidivism at Pentonville Prison.

== Personal life ==
Lord Faulks married Catherine Frances Turner, daughter of Lindsay Turner and Anthea Cadbury, in 1990. They have two sons. Catherine Faulks is a Conservative councillor on Kensington and Chelsea London Borough Council.

== Arms ==
Coat of arms of Edward Faulks, Baron Faulks

Crest
Within an ancient crown Or a monocerosphinx Argent horned and the tail tufted Or each wing charged with an estoile Gules the dexter foreclaws holding a palm branch Or entwining the horn of a slip of briar Vert.
Escutcheon
Argent a chevron engrailed Gules between three hierocosphinxes with the forelegs and hoofs of stags Vert about the neck of each a torse Or and Azure on a chief Vert two elephants statant each burdened with a tower Or each tusked and having a panache of three ostrich feathers at the brow Argent that on the dexter having the housings on the back Gules that on the sinister having the housings on the back Azure.
Supporters
On either side a lion Argent collared and the tail tufted Or tied to the back of the collar a banderolle Gules and a line the last reflexed around the body and terminating in an annulet Vert perched upon the interior paw a dove Or the interior hindfoot resting on a castle per pale Vert and Gules.
Motto
Audentia Et Clementia

Orders of precedence in the United Kingdom
Preceded by The Lord Reid of Cardowan	Gentlemen; The Lord Faulks	Followed by The Lord Allan of Hallam
