= Al Letson =

American journalist and radio host

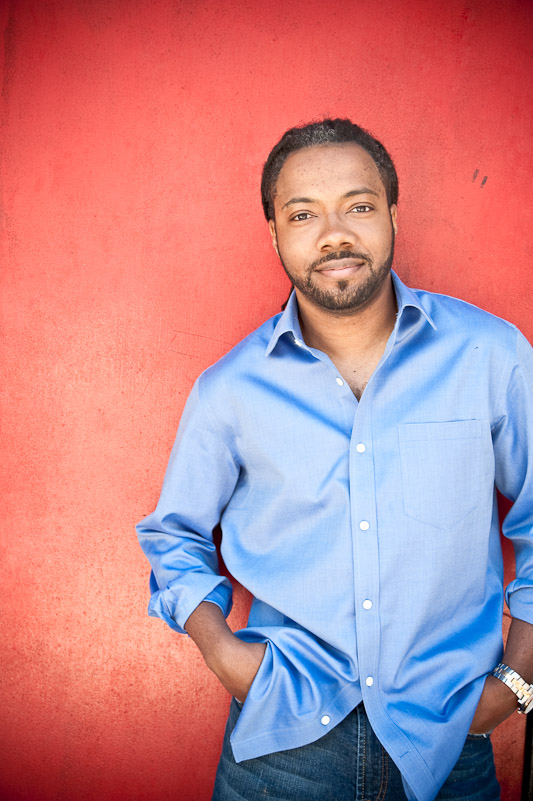
- Born: August 8, 1972 (age 54); Plainfield, New Jersey, U.S.
- Occupations: Journalist; radio host
- Known for: Reveal

Al Letson (born August 8, 1972) is an American writer, journalist, radio/ podcast host and screenwriter. Since 2013, he has served as the host of the radio show and podcast Reveal from the Center for Investigative Reporting and PRX, and since 2025 he has served as host of the interview podcast More To The Story, which is also produced by the Center for Investigative Reporting and PRX. Before that, he created and hosted the show State of the Re:Union, distributed by National Public Radio and PRX.

== Early life and career ==
Letson was born in Plainfield, New Jersey, the son of a minister. At the age of twelve he moved with his family to Orange Park, Florida, a suburb of Jacksonville. As a teenager he became interested in recording and hip hop, spending much of his free time in the studio and participating in Jacksonville's music and arts scene. After graduating from Orange Park High School, he took a job as a flight attendant for American Airlines, which allowed him to participate in poetry slams across the country.

== Performance poetry ==
Letson regularly appeared in slam poetry performances across the country and on TV including Russell Simmons's Def Poetry Jam, and CBS's Final Four Pre-Game Show. In 2000, he won the Atlanta Grand Slam and placed third in the National Poetry Slam competition.

== Playwriting ==
Letson began writing plays and acting, and in 2001, he produced his first one-man show, Essential Personnel, in Jacksonville. The show earned him commissions for his work and performances across the country. In 2004, the Baltimore School for the Arts commissioned him to write Chalk, a "poetical" combining stage acting with poetry. Other plays include Griot and Julius X, a retelling of William Shakespeare's Julius Caesar set in Harlem in 1965. His solo show Summer in Sanctuary opened Off-Broadway at the Abingdon Theatre Company in 2011

In 2007, Letson produced a short film which he released on the internet. This led to an appearance on the Fox film-themed reality show On the Lot.

In the fall of 2025, Letson's play Julius X was produced at Folger Shakespeare Library in Washington DC with Brandon Carter starring as Julius. According to a review on the website DC Theater Arts, "Al Letson’s script seamlessly blends spoken word with rhythm, music, slang, and verse to bring two worlds together — parallel yet separate across culture and time — creating something essential." The Folger's notes on the production said that "This bold new play takes Shakespeare’s classic tragedy Julius Caesar and reworks it through the lens of the American Civil Rights Movement, focusing on the story of Civil Rights leader Malcolm X and drawing parallels between ancient Rome and 1960s Harlem."

== Comics ==
Letson credits comic books with teaching him how to read and helping him conquer dyslexia. He worked on two independent comic books, Imperfect and Planetfall. In 2016, he was chosen by DC Comics to participate in the 2nd DC Comic writer's workshop. Letson and his cohorts learned DC's production methods and were given the opportunity to write for the company. His first story for DC came out in November 2017.

In 2025 Letson wrote Mister Terrific: Year One. A retelling and updating of Mister Terrific's origin story. A six issue limited series, Letson redefined the character, with artist Valentine DeLandro, Edwin Galmon, Marissa Louise, and Lucas Gatton.

== Public radio ==
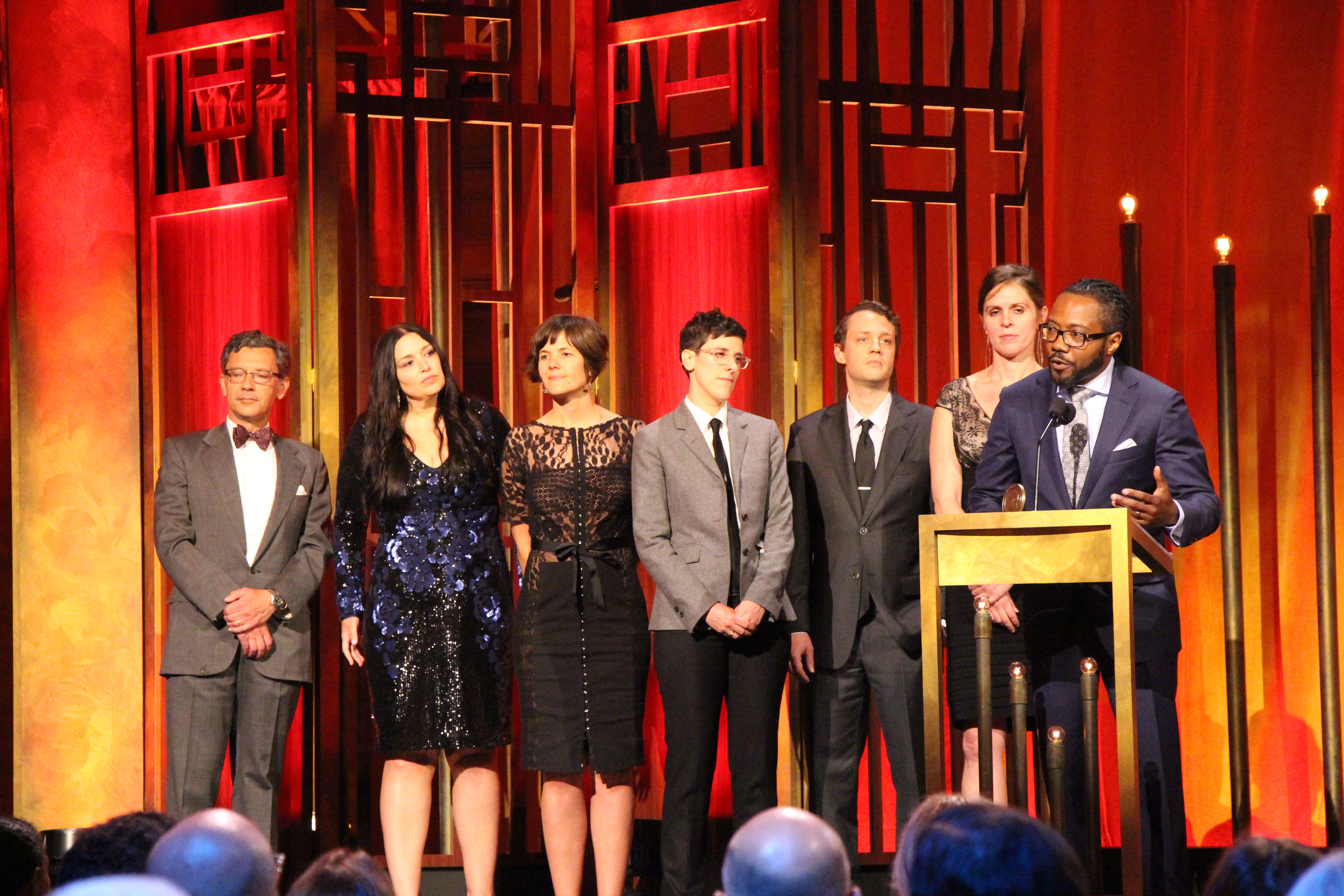
Al Letson and the crew of State of the Re:Union at the 74th Annual Peabody Awards

In 2007, Letson discovered a radio competition called the Public Radio Talent Quest. The program, organized by the Public Radio Exchange (PRX) and the Corporation for Public Broadcasting (CPB), used the competition as an open search for new public radio talent. The five-round competition began with more than 1,400 applicants and was voted on by fans, professionals and celebrity judges. Letson submitted a pilot for State of the Re:Union, and was chosen as one of three winners. From there, Letson's State of the Re:Union and Glynn Washington's Snap Judgement Radio were awarded funding by the CPB.

The first season of State of the Re:Union aired in 2010 and the show continued for six seasons, ending in 2015. State of the Re:Union won 3 consecutive Edward R. Murrow awards, 2 NABJ Awards, 3 NLGJA Awards, and a Peabody in 2015.

In 2013, Letson hosted pilots of Reveal, a podcast/public radio show from PRX and The Center for Investigative Reporting. The first pilot of Reveal received a Peabody and went into full production in 2014. Letson went on to become the full-time host of the program. He received the 2020 Gerald Loeb Award for Audio for the episode "Amazon: Behind the Smiles".

In 2016, Letson began hosting his own story podcast, Errthang Show!.

In 2021, he hosted a radio show Mississippi Goddam: The Ballad of Billy Joe (nominated for Peabody Award).

== Rally Against Hate ==
On August 27, 2017, Letson intervened to stop a man from being beaten during a protest. During a Berkeley, California "Rally Against Hate" demonstration that he was covering, Letson saw five masked protesters beating an unarmed man with sticks. Fearing for the man's life, Letson used his body as a human shield and encouraged the protesters to discontinue their attacks.

== Awards ==
2013: The pilot episode of Reveal, titled "The VA’s Opiate Overload," earned a Peabody Award, marking the program's inaugural recognition.

2014: State of the Re:Union received a Peabody Award for its exceptional coverage of American communities.

2018: Reveal was honored with two Peabody Awards for episodes "Kept Out" and "Monumental Lies."

2022: Robert F. Kennedy Journalism Award: Awarded in the radio category by the Robert F. Kennedy Human Rights organization, recognizing the series for its impactful reporting on human rights and social justice issues

2022 Investigative Reporters & Editors (IRE) Award: Received the top honor in the audio category, highlighting the series' excellence in investigative journalism for the series Mississippi Goddamn: The Ballad of Billy Joe.

2026 duPont-Columbia Awards. The Reveal episode, "Kids Under Fire in Gaza," won the highly regarded prize for audio and video reporting.
