= Richard Wall Lyman =

American educator, historian, and professor

7th President of Stanford University
- In office September 24, 1970 – August 1, 1980
- Preceded by: Kenneth Pitzer
- Succeeded by: Donald Kennedy

Personal details
- Born: October 18, 1923 Philadelphia, Pennsylvania, U.S.
- Died: May 27, 2012 (aged 88) Palo Alto, California, U.S.
- Spouse: Elizabeth "Jing" Schauffler (m. 1947)
- Education: Swarthmore College (BA); Harvard University (MA, PhD)
- Profession: Historian

Richard Wall Lyman (October 18, 1923 – May 27, 2012) was an American educator, historian, and professor who served as the seventh president of Stanford University from 1970 to 1980.

== Biography ==
An historian of the British Labour Party, Lyman spent two years at the London School of Economics in 1951 and 1952, researching for his PhD on the first Labour Government. He spent the period 1954-1958 teaching at Washington University in St. Louis. In 1957 his PhD was published as a book, entitled The First Labour Government, 1924. He joined Stanford in 1958.

He served as the provost of Stanford between 1967 and 1970. He then served as president of the university from 1970 to 1980. During his tenure as provost and president, he confronted campus dissidents involved in protests against the Vietnam war and other social issues of the 1960s. In the spring of 1969, he called in law enforcement authorities to evict and arrest students who were occupying campus buildings and removing administrative files. In referring to his leadership during his tenure, both of his immediate successors as president of the university have said that "Dick Lyman saved Stanford."

Lyman was elected to the American Academy of Arts and Sciences in 1971.

In 1983 he founded the Stanford Institute for International Studies and became its first director. He was the president of the Rockefeller Foundation from 1980 to 1988.

In 1998, Lyman was elected to the American Philosophical Society.

Lyman earned his bachelor's degree from Swarthmore College and his master's degree and PhD from Harvard University. He was a Fulbright scholar at the London School of Economics from 1951 to 1952. He came to Stanford in 1958 as a professor in history.

The Richard W. Lyman Award was established in 2002 by the National Humanities Center in honor of Lyman. He posthumously won the 2011 Alumni Achievement Award from Hamden Hall Country Day School.

He married Jing (1925–2013) in 1947 and they have four children. Jing Lyman was herself very active in the university and supported the founding of the Center for Research on Women (now the Clayman Institute for Gender Studies) in 1974. She was a "leading national figure in initiatives promoting fairer housing, community development and women’s economic empowerment." His granddaughter is radio producer Tina Antolini.

The Lyman Graduate Residence built in 1997 on the west side of campus is named for Richard Lyman and the Jing Lyman Commons Building within it for his wife.

He died in 2012 of heart failure, aged 88.

== Notes ==
Academic offices
Preceded by Kenneth S. Pitzer	President of Stanford University; 1970–1980	Succeeded by Donald Kennedy
