= Alon Shaya =

Israeli-American celebrity chef

- אלון שעיה
- Born: 1979 (age 46–47); Bat Yam, Israel
- Education: Harriton High School; Central Montco Technical School; Culinary Institute of America
- Occupations: Celebrity chef, restaurant owner
- Spouse: Emily Ostuw

Alon Shaya (Hebrew: אלון שעיה; born 1979) is an Israeli-American celebrity chef and restaurant owner. He is the author of several cookbooks and the owner of a hospitality and restaurant consulting business, Pomegranate Hospitality.

== Early years and education ==
Shaya was born in Bat Yam, Israel and raised in Philadelphia, where he moved at the age of four. He attended Harriton High School and the Central Montco Technical School. He trained at the Culinary Institute of America.

== Career ==
Shaya began his culinary career as an intern at the Rio Hotel and Casino in Las Vegas. He also cooked in restaurants in St. Louis and Italy. He moved to New Orleans in 2001, and later opened his namesake restaurant there. He opened the Pomegranate Hospitality company in 2017 and two new restaurants, Saba in New Orleans and Safta in Denver. Shaya was fired from the Besh Restaurant Group in 2017 when initial sexual harassment allegations were being publicized by employees of the company against owners of the group. Shaya spoke out in the midst of the controversy in support of the employees and shared that his repeated requests for human resource management during his time with the group had gone unanswered. He sued Besh to remove his name from the eatery but lost that case in an out of court settlement in 2018.

He was a judge on the 15th season of Top Chef.

In March 2018, Alon published his debut cookbook, "Shaya: An Odyssey of Food, My Journey Back to Israel" (Knopf). Part memoir and part cookbook.

Later in 2018, Saba opened in Uptown, New Orleans & Safta opened its doors in August 2018 in the River North neighborhood of Denver.

In 2019 he took chefs from his restaurants to Israel on a culinary tour so they could incorporate those tastes and flavors in the American establishments. He also participated in Galileat, a food workshop in Galilee.

In 2020 he presented at a Blackberry Farm event. He is a brand ambassador for Camellia Brand.

In mid 2021, Pomegranate Hospitality and the Four Season Hotel & Private Residences New Orleans will open the hotel’s signature restaurant and lobby bar. The restaurant, Miss River, will represent Alon & Emily’s love letter to Louisiana.

In 2024, Shaya opened Safta 1964 at the Wynn hotel and casino on the Las Vegas Strip.

== Awards ==
In 2010, Shaya was named one of Esquire Magazine’s “Chefs to Watch” and in 2012 he was named Chef of the Year by Eater New Orleans.

He listed as one of the “50 People Who are Changing the South” by Southern Living Magazine in 2015. He was also listed as one of the “50 Most Influential Jews in America” by the Forward.

He was nominated for five James Beard Awards and won two:

- 2015: James Beard Award for Best Chef, based on his cooking as the executive chef at Domenica

He won the “Youth Advocate Award” from Liberty's Kitchen, and was honored by InspireNOLA Schools for his work with Edna Karr Charter High School.

== Publications ==
He has contributed to KITCHN magazine. In 2018 he published Shaya: An Odyssey of Food, My Journey Back to Israel (Knopf).

== Philanthropy ==
In 2016, Shaya partnered with his high school home economics teacher, Donna Barnett, to form the Shaya Barnett Foundation, which brings culinary education to high schools.

During the COVID-19 pandemic, Shaya turned his closed restaurants into soup kitchens offering free meals to furloughed hospitality-industry workers. He also partnered with chef Edward Lee in founding the Restaurant Worker Relief program.

He is a chef fundraiser for No Kid Hungry, Alex’s Lemonade Stand, and DC Central Kitchen/Martha’s Table.

== Personal ==
Shaya is married to Emily Ostuw, and lives in New Orleans.
