= Tandoori Magazine =

British catering magazine

- Cover in spring 2007
- Editor: Humayun Hussain
- Staff writers: Antony Lopez
- Categories: Food, catering, business
- Frequency: Bi-monthly
- Publisher: Ajay Patel
- Founder: Iqbal Wahhab
- Founded: 1994
- First issue: September 1994
- Company: Periodical Publishing Association
- Country: United Kingdom
- Based in: Fulham, London
- Language: English
- Website: www.tandoorimagazine.com

Tandoori Magazine is a British bi-monthly trade magazine for the South Asian food and catering industry.

== See also ==
- South Asian cuisine
