= Salt Institute for Documentary Studies =

Documentary film school

- Type: Private
- Active: 1973; 53 years ago – 2016; 10 years ago (merged into Maine College of Art)
- Parent institution: Maine College of Art & Design
- Location: Portland, Maine, United States; 43.655670°N 70.260730°W
- Campus: Urban
- Website: salt.edu

The Salt Institute for Documentary Studies (or simply Salt) is a non-profit graduate institution located in Portland, Maine, United States, dedicated to the study of nonfiction storytelling, particularly documentary film and podcasting. Originally an independent school, since 2016 it has been part of the Maine College of Art. Salt focuses on educating and promoting responsible storytelling in documentary practices. Salt offers accredited semester programs in radio documentary, documentary photography, or non-fiction writing.

Salt alumni have worked on many well-known productions including 99% Invisible, Radiolab, and This American Life. Criminal co-creator Phoebe Judge, novelist Diane Cook, and radio and podcast producer Tina Antolini all attended Salt. The Salt Story Archive, which catalogs the work of Salt students, contains more than 1,300 projects from the school's history.

== History ==
High school English teacher Pamela Wood founded the school in Kennebunk, Maine in 1973. Students studied photojournalism and nonfiction writing, and their work was presented in its eponymous magazine, Salt.

In the late 1990s, the school introduced its radio program and moved to a new building in downtown Portland. After less than a decade, with publication of Salt erratic and the school struggling to pay its bills, it sold the building. The sale was enough to generate a small endowment, and the school moved to a more compact space on Congress Street.

Salt was never accredited during its time as an independent school and, without accreditation, it could not access federal student aid programs. As a result, Salt had to keep costs lower than competing accredited schools and had to dedicate time to fundraising for scholarships and aid it could provide students. By 2015, the financial burden on the school had reached a critical point, and it announced it would close permanently. A public outcry prompted the nearby Maine College of Art to propose a merger. With a financial boost from a local philanthropic foundation, Salt merged into MECA in 2016. Salt became an accredited institution for the first time as a result of the merger, and now offers federal student aid.

== Campus ==
Salt has moved several times in its history. Since 2016, it has been housed at the Maine College of Art campus in the historic Porteous, Mitchell and Braun Company Building in downtown Portland. The campus also includes five residence halls, and Salt students are able to live on campus during their program.

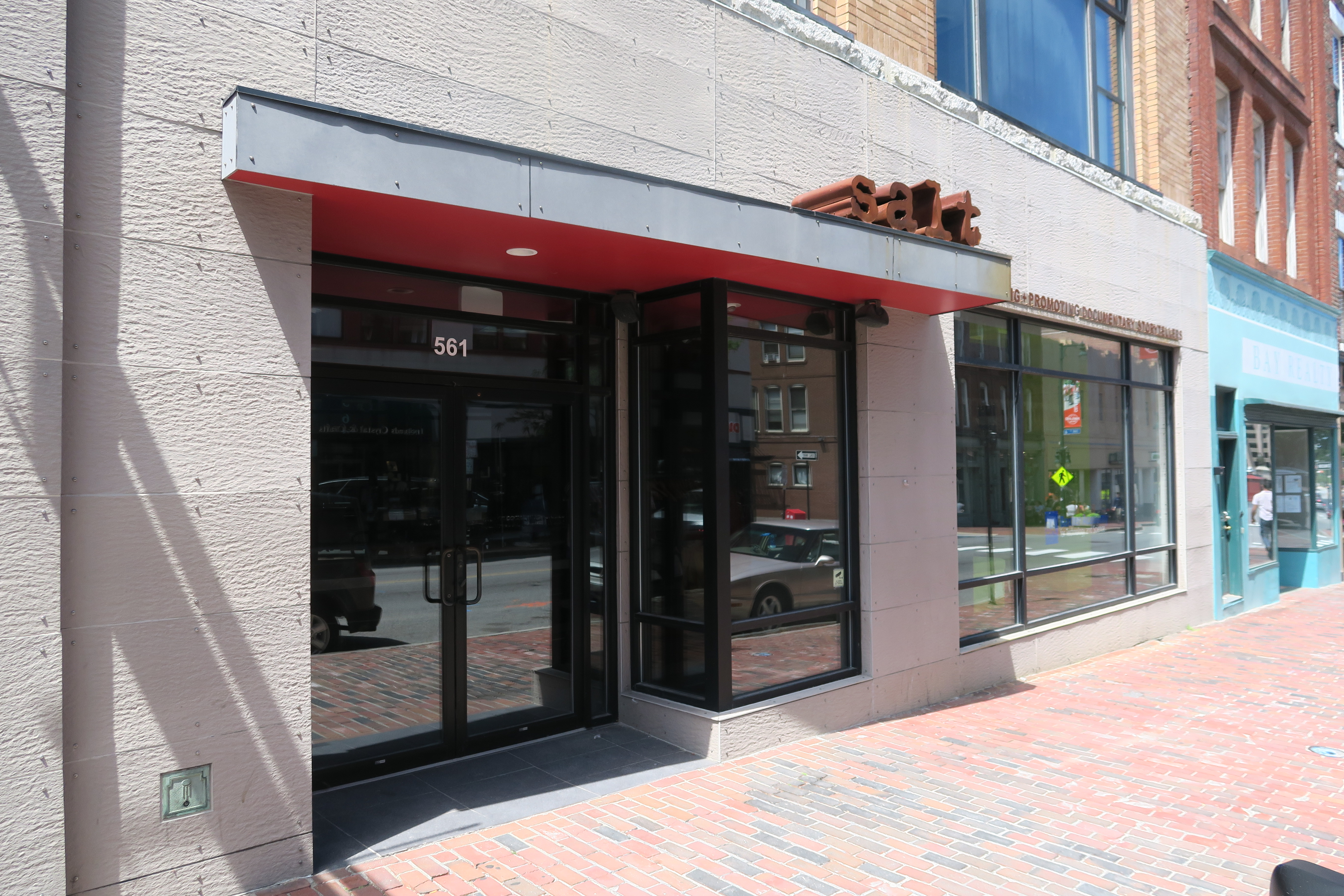
Former Salt Institute campus in Portland, Maine
