= HM Prison High Down =

Prison in Surrey, England

Coordinates: 51.3355°N 0.1897°W

HMP High Down
- Interactive map of HMP High Down
- Location: High Down Lane, Banstead SM2 5PJ, Surrey
- Security class: Adult Male/Category C
- Capacity: 1208
- Opened: 1992; 34 years ago
- Managed by: HM Prison Services
- Governor: Emily Martin
- Website: High Down at justice.gov.uk

HM Prison High Down is a Category C men's training / resettlement prison. It is located on the outskirts of Banstead in Surrey, England (overlooking Banstead Downs), and is immediately adjacent to the southern boundary of Belmont in Greater London. The prison is operated by His Majesty's Prison Service, and is near Downview Prison for women.

== History ==
High Down Prison was built in 1992 on the site previously occupied by Banstead Hospital. In November 2010, the prison football team played a friendly match against League Two side Wycombe Wanderers, losing 8–0.

High Down is a category C training prison and formerly a category B local prison. There is a visitors centre at the prison with facilities including baby changing facilities and a crèche. Conditions for prisoners reportedly deteriorated following staff cuts. The Clink is a public restaurant located within the prison and was the first of its kind to open within a UK prison.

=== Accommodation and facilities ===
Support includes: sentence planning, drug counseling, First Night in Prison scheme and Bail Information scheme. The prison has a detox unit. Prisoners can wear their own clothes rather than uniforms. Showers are provided on each landing. A pinphone system is in use, with all cells having their own phone.

=== Healthcare ===
The prison plans to open an offender personality disorder unit with a capacity of 23 beds in single cells, and has an Integrated Substance Misuse service. Dental services are provided three times a week, optician services fortnightly, chiropody services weekly, asthma services weekly and sexual health services weekly. GP and out of hours services are available. There is one full-time consultant forensic psychiatrist and an additional psychiatrist who works two days per week.

Healthcare services are provided by Central and North West London NHS Foundation Trust.

== Notable inmates ==
- Gary Glitter, jailed for 16 years at Southwark Crown Court in 2015 following conviction for multiple historic child sexual offences, was moved to HMP High Down one month into his sentence.
- Chris Lewis, former England cricketer was jailed in 2009 for drug smuggling and spent six years at the prison.
- Josh Payne, footballer who was jailed for twelve months for actual bodily harm and common assault.
