= State of the Re:Union =

Public radio show

- Running time: 60 Minutes
- Country of origin: United States
- Language: English
- Home station: WJCT-FM
- Hosted by: Al Letson
- Created by: Al Letson
- Written by: Various
- Produced by: Tina Antolini, Laura Starecheski, Zak Rosen, Brie Burge, Jan Bennett, Creative Empire LLC.
- Executive producers: Al Letson and Ian DeSousa
- Senior editor: Taki Telonidis
- No. of series: 5
- No. of episodes: 56
- Website: www.stateofthereunion.com

State of the Re:Union was a nationally aired public radio show created and hosted by playwright and performance artist Al Letson. State of the Re:Union was distributed by the Public Radio Exchange and National Public Radio, airing five seasons and 56 episodes on its networks from 2010 to 2015. The show won the Peabody Award in 2014.

== Origins ==
State of the Re:Union was a concept created by Al Letson as an entry in the Public Radio Talent Quest, which started with more than 1,400 hopefuls. The contest aimed to identify a new generation of Public Radio on-air talent. After four rounds and voting from both a select panel of judges and the public at large, three winners were selected. For his pilot episode, Letson and team created "Welcome to D.C.". Two of the three winning shows were awarded with a year's worth of funding to produce new episodes, including State of the Re:Union.

== Format ==
The stated mission of State of the Re:Union is to "show listeners how we are more alike than we are different and the many ways our differences are celebrated". The additional underlying premise is to show "how a particular city, town or area creates a community." Each hour-long episode centers on a particular area and typically poses a question with which to explore the area. For example, the Jacksonville episode asks the question, "Is Jacksonville the Bold New City of the South?" as it is advertised. Typically, the show centers on three to four segments that feature stories that try to answer the proposed question. Letson narrates the program and conducts most of the interviews, but stories are also heard from first-person narratives. The main segments are accompanied by listener-written and read letters to the city, music, lighter fare and Letson's spoken word pieces.

Chosen topics are typically selected from current events, cultural happenings and out-of-the-ordinary business ventures. Due to such a wide range of features, the tone ranges from serious, investigatory and at times somber to happy, hopeful and humorous.

Part of the show is the "Dear City Letters" section, where people who are making a difference are asked if they'd be willing and able to write a letter TO their city.

== Episodes ==
=== Pilot season ===
Four episodes were grouped as Pilot Season.

No. overall	No. in season	Title	Featured location	Release date
P0	P0	"Welcome to D.C."	Washington, D.C.	TBA
Unknown Aspects of the Nation's Capitol, Go-Go Music, Shaw District's Gentrification Challenges, Interview with Ian MacKaye
P1	P1	"Motor City Rebound"	Detroit, Michigan	August 14, 2010
Detroit Artist Broken Window Glass Project, Activist Grace Lee Boggs, Avalon Bakery, Inner City Agricultural Revolution, Baker's Keyboard Lounge
P2	P2	"Bold New City of the South?"	Jacksonville, Florida	TBA
Church of Jacksonville Takes on Racial Issues, Operation New Hope Paves the Way for Recitivism Programs and the Controversy surrounding the Name of Local High School Nathan B. Forrest High School
P3	P3	"Heart of the Heartland"	Des Moines, Iowa	TBA
Al Obeidi on His Story and New Home, The Des Moines Social Club, The Envy Corps and their music, a personal voyage on Gay Marriage in Iowa and innovative, yet simple Pig Farming methods used by one creative farmer to prevent being squeezed out by bigger factory farms

=== Season 1 ===
Season 1 is composed of 12 total episodes including a Black History Month special "Who is this man?", five Spring 2010 season episodes, and six Fall 2010 season episodes and specials.

No. overall	No. in season	Title	Featured subject/location	Release date
1	1	"Who is this man?"	Bayard Rustin	April 5, 2010
2	2	"Change Happens"	Brooklyn, New York	May 1, 2010
3	3	"To the Stars through Difficulties"	Greensburg, Kansas	May 3, 2010
4	4	"City of Vision"	Milwaukee, Wisconsin	May 3, 2010
5	5	"A Work in Progress"	Oakridge, Oregon	May 3, 2010
6	6	"The Big Easy"	New Orleans, Louisiana	May 4, 2010
7	7	"Growing Pains"	Austin, Texas	August 20, 2010
8	8	"Appalachia Rising"	Appalachia (West Virginia and Eastern Kentucky)	August 21, 2010
9	9	"World Within Twin Cities"	Minneapolis and Saint Paul, Minnesota	September 16, 2010
10	10	"Home, Sweet Home"	Los Angeles, California	September 17, 2010
11	11	"Veterans Day Special"	N/A	November 11, 2010
12	12	"The Land Remembers"	Española, New Mexico	August 16, 2011

=== Season 2 ===
Season 2 is composed of 10 episodes including the Spring 2011 season and Fall 2011 season.

No. overall	No. in season	Title	Featured subject/location	Release date
13	1	"The Long Story Short"	Birmingham, Alabama	May 1, 2011
14	2	"Bright Lights, Big City, Small Town"	Las Vegas, Nevada	May 1, 2011
15	3	"Bridging the Divide"	Miami, Florida	May 1, 2011
16	4	"The Self-Made City"	Oakland, California	May 1, 2011
17	5	"City with a Warm Heart"	Utica, New York	May 1, 2011
18	6	"Defending the Gulf"	Mississippi Gulf Coast	August 17, 2011
19	7	"Still Rising from the Ashes"	The Bronx, New York	August 18, 2011
20	8	"The New Old West"	Wyoming	August 19, 2011
21	9	"Entrepreneurs at Work"	Cleveland, Ohio	August 20, 2011
22	10	"All Hands on Deck"	Sacramento, California	September 10, 2011

=== Season 3 ===
Season 3 is composed of 13 episodes including the Fall 2012 season and the Spring 2013 season.

No. overall	No. in season	Title	Featured subject/location	Release date
23	1	"The Unlikely Perfect Place"	Southern Washington	June 1, 2012
24	2	"The Small Town State"	Vermont	June 1, 2012
25	3	"Outsiders In"	Baltimore, Maryland	June 3, 2012
26	4	"Full Circle"	Ozarks	June 4, 2012
27	5	"With Great Power Comes Great Responsibility"	Comics	June 5, 2012
28	6	"Summer in Sanctuary: A Graduation Special"	Dropouts	October 29, 2012
29	7	"Borderlands"	Tucson, Arizona	October 29, 2012
30	8	"Grinding the Gears"	Jacksonville, Florida	November 1, 2012
31	9	"Virtual Reality"	Internet communities	November 24, 2012
32	10	"As Black as We Wish to Be"	East Jackson, Ohio	November 28, 2012
33	11	"Coming Home: Stories of Veterans Returning from War"	War veterans from Iraq and Afghanistan	June 7, 2013
34	12	"Dropouts to Graduates: The Story of the Care Center"	The Care Center, Holyoke, Massachusetts	June 17, 2013
35	13	"Back to Basics: An American Graduate Special"	Dropouts	September 17, 2013

=== Season 4 ===
Season 4 includes the Fall 2013 season and the Spring 2014 season. It also includes some Black History Month specials.

No. overall	No. in season	Title	Featured subject/location	Release date
36	1	"The Hospital Always Wins"	Creedmoor Psychiatric Center	October 1, 2013
37	2	"A Tale of Two Cities"	Portland, Oregon	October 7, 2013
38	3	"Reconciliation Way"	Tulsa, Oklahoma	October 15, 2013
39	4	"The Southwestern Range"	TBA	October 22, 2013
40	5	"Re:Defining Black History"	Black History Month	January 4, 2014
41	6	"Leadership from the Bottom Up"	African-American leaders	January 29, 2014
42	7	"When Words Matter: A National Poetry Month Special"	National Poetry Month	April 9, 2014
43	8	"The Legacy of Sugar"	Sugar plantations in Hawaii	May 13, 2014
44	9	"Contested"	Durham, North Carolina	May 20, 2014
Shorts from the Center for Documentary Studies, Duke University, in Durham.
45	10	"Updating Tradition"	Salt Lake City, Utah	May 27, 2014
46	11	"The Sorting of America"	TBA	June 3, 2014
47	12	"Frontier Community"	Interior Alaska	June 10, 2014

==== Season 4 shorts ====
No. overall	No. in season	Title	Featured subject/location	Release date
S1	1	"Soteria"	TBA	October 18, 2013
S2	2	"Dear Voices"	TBA	October 18, 2013
S3	3	"Move by Bike"	TBA	November 19, 2013
S4	4	"Dear Tulsa"	Tulsa, Oklahoma	December 3, 2013
S5	5	"The Possibilities of the Stars"	TBA	January 8, 2014
S6	6	"In East Portland, Soccer Helps Make a City Home"	TBA	January 22, 2014
S7	7	"The Life of a Big Idea"	TBA	March 18, 2014
S8	8	"Thrashing in the Woods"	TBA	April 1, 2014
S9	9	"The Friendship of Ross and Stardust"	TBA	April 29, 2014

=== Season 5 ===
Season 5 includes the Fall 2014 season and the 2015 season.

No. overall	No. in season	Title	Featured subject/location	Release date
48	1	"Trans Families"	Transgender families	September 30, 2014
49	2	"American Justice"	American prison system	October 6, 2014
50	3	"Truckers of the High Seas"	Cargo ship	October 13, 2014
51	4	"Travelogue: Volume 1"	SOTRU team	October 13, 2014
Al Letson and the SOTRU team share their favorite stories and interviews
52	5	"The Power of African-American Art"	African-American art	February 13, 2015
SOTRU covers African-American art in the Black History Month special
53	6	"Power to the People"	Ithaca, New York	April 21, 2015
Producer Jonathan Miller goes to his hometown of Ithaca to see how the city's citizens are activists in climate change
54	7	"The Poems, The Poets, the Power"	National Poetry Month	April 24, 2015
55	8	"Small Town, Global City"	San Gabriel Valley, California	May 4, 2015
56	9	"Travelogue: Volume Two"	SOTRU team	May 19, 2015
Al Letson and the SOTRU team share more stories and interviews.

==== Season 5 shorts ====
No. overall	No. in season	Title	Featured subject/location	Release date
S10	1	"The Whistler"	TBA	December 3, 2014
S11	2	"A New Orleans Church Memorializes Murder Victims"	TBA	January 14, 2015
S12	3	"Dear Salt Lake City"	Salt Lake City, Utah	January 28, 2015
S13	4	"A Couple Twice Born"	TBA	March 3, 2015

== Accolades ==
- Friedheim Travel Award: for the public radio broadcast of “Brooklyn - Change Happens”
- National Lesbian & Gay Journalists Association Award for Excellence in Radio for the episode “Bayard Rustin: Who is This Man?”, 2011
- Peabody Award for State of the Re:Union, 2014
- Edward R. Murrow Award for the "As Black As We Wish to Be" episode, 2013
- Edward R. Murrow Award for "The Hospital Always Wins" episode, 2014
- Edward R. Murrow Award for the "Trans Families" episode, 2015
- Radio Television Digital News Association (RTDNA) Kaleidoscope Award for the “Trans Families” episode, 2015
