= Fred Hill (activist) =

British activist

- Born: 13 May 1909; Yorkshire, England
- Died: 10 February 1984 (aged 74); HM Prison Pentonville, Barnsbury, North London, England
- Occupation(s): Activist, teacher
- Known for: Protesting crash helmet laws in the UK

Fred Hill (13 May 1909 – 10 February 1984) was a British activist and retired school teacher who protested against the compulsory wearing of crash helmets on motorcycles.

== Early life ==
Hill was born on 13 May 1909 in Yorkshire. During World War II he was a motorcycle despatch rider. He had also been a school teacher and taught mathematics.

== Context ==
After the death of T. E. Lawrence in a motorcycle accident in May 1935, Dr Hugh Cairns, a young neurosurgeon in the British Army, observed how Lawrence's death could have been avoided if he had worn a helmet. At the beginning of the Second World War, he used his position as a consultant neurosurgeon to recommended mandatory helmet use for British Service despatch riders, believing it would cut down the unnecessary loss of life amongst army motorcycle despatch riders dying as a result of head injuries. These recommendations were accepted by the British Army with crash helmets becoming compulsory for all army motorcyclists on duty from November 1941.

It would be thirty-two years later that the wearing of motorcycle crash helmets became compulsory for civilians in the United Kingdom.

A clause providing for helmet regulations was unsuccessfully proposed as part of the 1956 Road Traffic Act; it was then successfully included as part of the Road Traffic Act 1962, although another eleven years would pass before any such regulations were introduced. In 1973 the ‘Motor Cycles (Wearing of Helmets) Regulations 1973′ was published on 7 February, to be put into operation swiftly by 1 June 1973. Although Members of Parliament could not block these regulations, they took the opportunity to discuss and debate the issue once again on 5 April 1973. Some Members of Parliament described the compulsory wearing of helmets as an improper interference with individual freedom, including Enoch Powell. Nevertheless, the regulations came into effect and it became a legal requirement for all civilian motorcycle riders to wear a helmet.

== Activism ==
After retiring from teaching and incensed by the compulsory helmet law, Hill's campaign against the UK compulsory wearing of motorcycle helmets intensified in 1976 after the Sikh community gained a religious exemption from the law. He made many speeches about equal treatment. He said that if one community did not have to wear helmets then nobody should have to, although he rarely made direct reference to the Sikhs' exemption and denied being racist.

Hill was frequently arrested for riding without wearing a helmet, including when on demos. Consequently, he accumulated a large number of summonses. It was his refusal to pay the fines, rather than the helmetless riding offences, that led to his imprisonment, the charges being the more serious one of "Contempt of Court". Although he was always polite to the authorities that pursued and imprisoned him, Hill was unimpressed by people in high positions. On one occasion a female magistrate was endeavouring to chastise Hill for breaking the law, to which criticism, Hill, implicitly referring to Emmeline Pankhurst and the female emancipation movement, replied, "if it hadn't been for a woman breaking the law, you wouldn't be sitting there now madam".

Besides enduring many prison sentences, Hill supported the anti-helmet law campaign organised by the Motorcycle Action Group (MAG) and attended many of their demos, at which he made speeches. Despite his age, Hill would ride considerable distances for which purpose he traded in his moped for a 250 Honda. Despite the distance he travelled in inclement weather conditions, Hill always rode home the same day after a demo for his wife’s sake, and declined offers of accommodation.

== Imprisonment and death ==
Hill's refusal to pay the fines for helmetless riding often constituted ‘Contempt of Court’ for which Hill was sentenced to a total of thirty one prison sentences between 1976 and 1984.

It was during Hill's thirty first prison sentence that he suffered a heart attack and subsequently died on 10 February 1984, while serving two months in London's Pentonville Prison, aged 74. An inquiry, held to establish whether Hill's treatment had contributed to his death, found no evidence for this.

Memorial rides continue annually across the UK, allowing riders to show their gratitude and respect for Hill.
