= Laura Sullivan =

American journalist

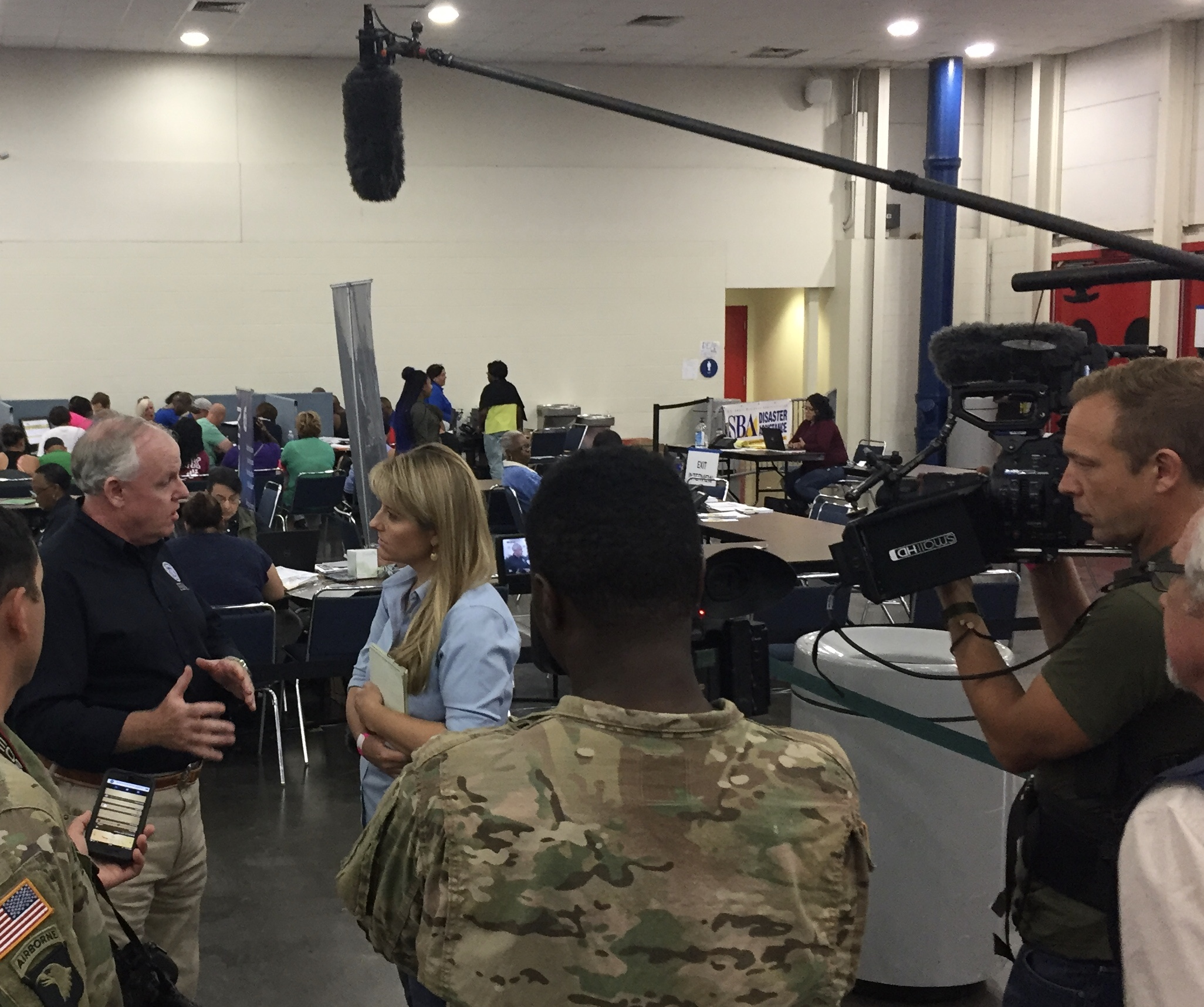
- Laura Sullivan interviewing a FEMA manager after Hurricane Harvey in 2017 at the Houston Convention Center
- Born: 1974 (age 50–51) San Francisco, California, U.S.
- Occupation: Investigative reporter, correspondent
- Education: Northwestern University
- Years active: 1996–present

Laura Sullivan (born about 1974) is a correspondent and investigative reporter for National Public Radio (NPR). Her investigations air regularly on Morning Edition, All Things Considered, and other NPR programs. She is also an on-air correspondent for the PBS show Frontline. Sullivan's work specializes in shedding light on some of the country's most disadvantaged people. She is one of NPR's most decorated journalists, with three Peabody Awards, three Alfred I. duPont-Columbia University Awards, and more than a dozen other prestigious national awards.

== Early life and education ==
Sullivan graduated from Lick-Wilmerding High School in San Francisco, California, and the Medill School of Journalism at Northwestern University. In 1996, Sullivan and two fellow university seniors expanded a class assignment that ultimately freed four men (Ford Heights Four) who had been wrongfully convicted of a 1978 murder in Chicago's South Side; two were death-row inmates. The case was one of several that led to a moratorium on capital punishment in Illinois. Sullivan wrote about the project, which won a special citation from Investigative Reporters and Editors, in an essay for the Sunday June 27, 1999 edition of the Baltimore Sun.

== Career ==
=== 2000s ===
Before coming to NPR in 2004, Sullivan covered the United States Department of Justice, the FBI, and terrorism from the Baltimore Sun's Washington, D.C. bureau.

In 2007, Sullivan won the 2007 Daniel Schorr Journalism Prize. and her first Gracie for her series "Life in Solitary Confinement".

Her 2007 news series investigating sexual assault of Native American women won her first duPont. It also won the DART Award for Excellence in coverage of Trauma for outstanding reporting, an RTNDA Edward R Murrow Award for Investigative Reporting and her second Gracie Award for American Women in Radio and Television.

In 2008, her series "36 Years of Solitary: Murder, Death and Justice on Angola" earned Sullivan her first Peabody, an Investigative Reporters and Editors award, and a Robert F. Kennedy Award for investigative reporting.

=== 2010s ===
In 2010, Sullivan's three part series Bonding For Profit: Behind the Bail Bond System examined the deep and costly flaws of bail bonding in the United States. In addition to her second Peabody and duPont, the series was also honored by the Scripps Howard Foundation, the Joan Shorenstein Center on the Press, Politics and Public Policy at Harvard University's John F. Kennedy School of Government and the American Bar Association.

In 2011, Sullivan produced a series on the state of foster care for Native American children focusing largely on alleged wrongdoing in the state of South Dakota and garnering her a third Peabody and her second Robert F. Kennedy award for investigative reporting among other awards.

Also in 2011, Sullivan won her second commendation from Investigative Reporters and Editors for her two-part series examining the origin of the Arizona SB 1070 immigration law.

On August 9, 2013, NPR's ombudsman released an analysis of Sullivan's South Dakota series that concluded the series was "deeply flawed" and "should not have been aired as it was." However, NPR stood by the series and called the ombudsman's report "unorthodox, the sourcing selective, fact-gathering uneven and the conclusions, subjective or without foundation." Two subsequent reports, one by a coalition of nine Lakota tribes, and another by the National Coalition for Child Protection Reform, reviewed the ombudsman's report and found the NPR series was sound. In May 2015, a federal judge ruled in summary judgment in favor of South Dakota's tribes finding that the State of South Dakota and its Department of Social Services had "failed to protect Indian parents' fundamental rights."

In May 2016, Sullivan collaborated with the PBS series Frontline as a correspondent for an hour long documentary examining the profit-driven nature of the insurance business after disasters. Prior to this, Sullivan had worked on other investigations in disasters into the American Red Cross delving into the charity's finances and its performance after the Haiti earthquake and Hurricane Sandy. Those stories were honored with Sullivan's second Goldsmith Award from the Joan Shorenstein Center on the Press, Politics and Public Policy at Harvard University and her third commendation from Investigative Reporters and Editors.

Sullivan continued to collaborate with Frontline as a correspondent on five more films, Poverty, Politics and Profit, which examined the billions spent housing the poor, and Blackout in Puerto Rico, which investigated the federal response, Wall Street and years of neglect on the island in the wake of Hurricane Maria. Blackout in Puerto Rico earned the team the 2019 Gerald Loeb Award for Video.

Other Frontlines she was involved with include Trump's Trade Wars in 2019, Plastic Wars in 2020 and The Hospital Divide in 2021, which was a finalist for the Peabody Award.

In 2022, Sullivan won her third duPont award for her podcast Waste Land and series airing on Planet Money and NPR in partnership with Frontline which investigated "How Big Oil Misled The Public Into Believing Plastic Would Be Recycled" unearthing internal records from the oil industry. The series also investigated how oil companies evaded regulation for 40 years over spilling billions of plastic pellets into the environment. In 2022, citing NPR's investigation, California Attorney General Rob Bonta opened an investigation into the actions of the oil and plastic industry saying it took part in "an aggressive campaign to deceive the public, perpetuating a myth that recycling can solve the plastics crisis." 2021 Peabody Award nominated for her work reporting on the inequalities in the American healthcare system exacerbated by the COVID-19 pandemic.
