= Neville Faulks =

English barrister and High Court judge

Sir Neville Faulks MBE, TD
- Mr Justice Faulks in 1963 by Walter Bird

Justice of the High Court
- In office 10 January 1963 – 31 December 1977

Personal details
- Born: 27 January 1908
- Died: 13 October 1985 (aged 77)
- Spouse(s): Bridget Marigold Bodley (m. 1940; died 1963) Elizabeth Parham (m. 1967; died 1982)
- Children: 3
- Relatives: Edward Faulks, Baron Faulks (nephew); Sebastian Faulks (nephew)
- Education: Sidney Sussex College, Cambridge

Sir Neville Major Ginner Faulks, MBE, TD (27 January 1908 – 13 October 1985) was an English barrister and High Court judge.

== Biography ==
Faulks was the son of M. J. Faulks, and Ada Mabel Faulks; his brother Peter Ronald Faulks, MC was later a Circuit Judge, and was the father of author Sebastian Faulks and of barrister and minister Edward Faulks, Baron Faulks.

Faulks was educated at Uppingham School and Sidney Sussex College, Cambridge. He was called to the bar at the Inner Temple in 1930, at the early age of 22. On the outbreak of the Second World War he joined the Territorial Army and saw action in North Africa, including at the Battle of El Alamein. He ended the war with the rank of lieutenant-colonel, was appointed an MBE, and twice mentioned in despatches.

His legal career took off after the war. In 1946 he was appointed prosecuting counsel to the Board of Trade, and developed a large practice in commercial and libel law. He was appointed Queen's Counsel in 1959. The same year he was appointed under the Companies Act 1948 to investigate the affairs of H Jasper & Company Limited, a merchant bank which had failed; his report, released in 1961, led to changes in company law. He was Recorder of Deal between 1957–59 and Recorder of Norwich between 1959 and 1963. He was head of chambers at 1 Brick Court, a set which specialised in defamation law.

In 1963, Faulks was appointed to the High Court and was knighted. He was assigned to the Probate, Divorce and Admiralty Division, which was later reformed as the Family Division. On the bench, some of his colourful remarks attracted controversy. Most notably, at a 1974 trial of a man who had kicked his wife, Faulks told him that "If you had been a miner in South Wales, I might have overlooked it. But you are a cultured gentleman living in a respected part of the community." The following day, he admitted to having been "an absolute ass" and apologised in open court.

Faulks retired in 1977. After his retirement, he published two volumes of memoirs: No Mitigating Circumstances (1977) and A Law Unto Myself (1978).

== Family ==
Faulks married Bridget Marigold Bodley in 1940. She was born in 1921 in Paddington, London, and was a childhood friend of author Pamela Whitlock of 'The Far Distant Oxus' fame, and may have been a source of inspiration for a central character of the novel. They had two sons and a daughter; she died in 1963. In 1967, Faulks remarried to Elizabeth Parham, widow of Rt Rev Arthur Parham MC, Bishop of Reading; she died in 1982.
