= Katharine Mieszkowski =

American journalist

Katharine Mieszkowski (born 1971) is an American journalist.

== Biography ==
Katharine Mieszkowski was born in 1971. She graduated from Yale University with a bachelor's degree in Literature in 1993.

Mieszkowski was the sixth employee of Women's Wire (later Women.com) in 1994. On staff at Fast Company from 1997 to 2000, Mieszkowski covered Silicon Valley. Her column about San Francisco Bay area subcultures, "Culture Shocked," ran in the San Francisco Bay Guardian between 1997 and 2003.

At Salon.com from Feb. 2000 to Aug. 2009, Mieszkowski covered the environment, science, and technology. Her 2000 story "Fumble.com" was anthologized by Michael Lewis in Panic: The Story of Modern Financial Insanity, published in 2008. Her story 2006 story "I make $1.45 a week, and I love it!" about Amazon.com's Mechanical Turk was anthologized by Steven Levy in The Best American Technology Writing 2007.

She has been a senior writer for Salon.com and Fast Company magazine. Her articles have appeared in The New York Times, Rolling Stone, Mother Jones, Glamour, Reader's Digest, Slate, Ms., and San Francisco magazine.

Her radio commentaries have been featured on NPR's All Things Considered and PRI's Living on Earth programs.

Mieszkowski is a senior reporter for Reveal from the Center for Investigative Reporting, winning (along with Lance Williams and Michael Corey) the 2017 Kevin Carmody Award for Outstanding In-Depth Reporting from the Society of Environmental Journalists for the Reveal News four-part investigative series "The Wet Princes of Bel Air", and the 2020 Gerald Loeb Award for Audio for "Amazon: Behind the Smiles".

== Awards and honors ==
When Mother Jones magazine won the 2009 Utne Independent Press Award for environmental coverage, judges cited Mieszkowski's piece about Wegmans, "Big Green Brother". In 2001, Mieszkowski was honored as one of the top 25 Women on the Web by San Francisco Women on the Web. Mieszkowski contributed reporting and production assistance for the Reveal podcast "Mississippi Goddam: The Ballad of Billy Joe", which was nominated for a Peabody Award in 2021.
