= Esther Kaplan =

American investigative journalist

Esther Kaplan is an investigative journalist and investigations editor at Insider, and she has previously worked at The Center for Investigative Reporting, Village Voice, and The Nation, In radio she's worked for WBAI. Her work has been published in Poz and Harper's Magazine. She is the author of the book With God on Their Side George W. Bush and the Christian Right.

== Life ==
Esther Kaplan grew up during the 1970s in King's Valley, Oregon. In the late 1980s she lived in New York City. She graduated from Yale University.

== Works ==
- With God on their side : how Christian fundamentalists trampled science, policy, and democracy in George W. Bush's White House. The New Press, 2004. ISBN 978-1565849204
