= Reveal (podcast) =

American investigative reporting radio show and podcast

- Genre: Investigative reporting
- Language: English

Cast and voices
- Hosted by: Al Letson

Production
- Production: Al Letson
- Length: 60 minutes

Technical specifications
- Audio format: MP3

Publication
- No. of seasons: 12
- No. of episodes: 269 (as of December 2020)
- Original release: September 28, 2013
- Provider: PRX (radio), Center for Investigative Reporting
- Updates: Active, weekly

Related
- Website: www.revealnews.org

Reveal is a nationally broadcast public radio show and investigative reporting podcast hosted by Al Letson, and produced by the Center for Investigative Reporting. The radio program is released on Saturdays on radio stations in the Public Radio Exchange network and the show is also available in podcast form. It is part of a growing trend of investigative reporting being disseminated through audio. Its first weekly season was ranked among the top 50 podcasts by The Atlantic.

Reveal has experimented with new modes of distribution, including using SMS to provide interactivity to its podcasts..

Reveal shares a newsroom with Mother Jones, which merged with the Center for Investigative Reporting in 2024, and often showcases its staff members' reporting. The show sued the Trump Administration under the Freedom of Information Act for access to records related to the cost of the border wall the administration is pursuing. Its reporting resulted in the shutdown of unlicensed work camps being used as drug treatment facilities.

Reveal's CEO was Christa Scharfenberg. Since Reveal merged as part of the Center for Investigative Reporting with Mother Jones in 2024, the CEO is Monika Bauerlein. Reveal's executive producer is Brett Myers.

Reveal's investigation into racial disparities in mortgage lending in 2018 was mentioned on the floor of the Senate by Senator Elizabeth Warren and was the subject of a lengthy op-ed in The New York Times.

In 2017, host Al Letson was photographed physically intervening to protect a right-wing protester at a rally that turned violent in Berkeley, California.

== History ==
Reveal has partnered with PBS NewsHour and The Texas Tribune.

In 2022, financial hardship and the layoff of 14 percent of Reveal staff ultimately led to the resignation of Reveal CEO Kaizar Campwala. In 2023, Reveal employees sought recognition for the newly formed Reveal union. In 2024, it merged as part of the Center for Investigative Reporting with Mother Jones. In 2025, Reveal launched a weekly interview podcast, More to the Story.

Despite earlier financial challenges, the merger with Mother Jones in 2024 allowed Reveal to retool its approach, and increase its podcast audience.

== Reception and awards ==
In 2013, the show received a Peabody Award for its first radio episode, "Reveal: The VA's Opiate Overload (Public Radio)".

Reveal won the 2017 Edward Murrow Award from the Overseas Press Club for best News Documentary for "Dropped and Dismissed: Child Sex Abuse Lost in the System" as well as Best Sports Reporting for "Making the Team". The episode "Voting Rights – and Wrongs" earned a podcast Webby Award in 2017 for News & Information. In 2016, it won the Edward R. Murrow Award for Overall Excellence for a small online news organization.

Two episodes from 2018, "Monumental Lies" and "Kept Out", each won Peabody Awards, and the radio show itself won the Alfred I. duPont–Columbia University Award in 2018.

Reveal has been selected a Pulitzer Prize finalist four times: in 2025, in the explanatory reporting category, for its collaboration with the Center for Public Integrity and Mother Jones, "40 Acres and a Lie"; in 2020, in the explanatory reporting category, for "Amazon: Behind the Smiles;; in 2019, in the explanatory reporting category, for its collaboration with the Associated Press and PBS NewsHour, "Kept Out"; and in 2018, in the national reporting category, for "All Work. No Pay. Life at a Rehab Work Camp."

== Episodes ==
Reveal releases new episodes weekly on Saturdays. As of 14 May 2026, the show has released 617 episodes.

No.	Title	Original release date	Running Time
1	"Reveal (Pilot 1: The VA's deadly pain pill habit)"	September 28, 2013	52:00
America's worst charities, defending leaks, a history of official secrecy, the VA's pain pill habit, the drama of an investigation, policing on camera, and brotherly love.
2	"Reveal (Pilot 2: The Heroin Highway)"	March 1, 2014	52:00
What's it like for teens in 'the box', investigative reporting inspires poetry, tracing Chicago's heroin supply chain, security on the border, action on the VA's pain pill habit, no animals were harmed, and sexual abuse of female farmworkers.
3	"Reveal (Pilot 3: The arsenic in our drinking water)"	June 28, 2014	52:00
The Coast Guard's deadly accidents, the politics of poison, secrecy behind Missouri's execution drugs, and profiting off the GI Bill.
4	"China brings home the bacon with America's pigs"	Jan 23, 2015	17:00
5	"Confronting love and oppression in Afghanistan"	Jan 23, 2015	13:00
6	"The secrets of church, state and business"	Feb 13, 2015	58:00
7	"Bogus screws ended up in spines of surgery patients"	March 16, 2015	17:00
8	"Photo sparks war crimes probe"	March 23, 2015	21:00
9	"Who's responsible when America's your drug dealer?"	March 30, 2015	17:00
10	"Rerouted for sex"	April 7, 2015	11:00
11	"Her clients may be notorious, but Judy Clarke is a mystery"	April 13, 2015	13:00
12	"From detention to detainment in Virginia"	April 20, 2015	14:00
13	"DIY guns? There's a site for that"	April 27, 2015	14:00
14	"Dirty shooting ranges poison police"	May 4, 2015	18:00
15	"Assault on justice"	May 11, 2015	23:00
16	"Rodney King's accidental ally"	May 18, 2015	12:00
17	"Eyes on Cops"	May 25, 2015	18:00
18	"Public evidence in private hands"	June 2, 2015	15:00
19	"Death in the Bakken"	June 15, 2015	21:00
20	"The father of fracking, and tracking oil trains"	June 22, 2015	20:00
21	"Oklahoma's man-made earthquakes"	June 29, 2015	17:00
22	"Rape on the Night Shift"	July 6, 2015	28:00
23	"Nuclear Bomb Industry Booming"	July 13, 2015	19:00
24	"Toxic tech in America"	July 20, 2015	10:00
25	"Disposable workers in Asia"	July 27, 2015	12:00
26	"The long tale of the short-handled hoe"	August 3, 2015	7:00
27	"Shunned and Shamed by Jehovah's Witnesses"	August 10, 2015	24:00
28	"The Con Man and His Mentor"	August 18, 2015	14:00
29	"Change in the air in Virginia"	August 25, 2015	18:00
30	"She never left Harlan alive"	Sept 7, 2015	17:00
31	"Unidentified migrants reach undignified end"	Sept 14, 2015	20:00
32	"Buried in Blue Earth"	Sept 21, 2015	18:00
33	"Matching the lost and the found"	Sept 28, 2015	17:00
34	"Secret super water users"	Oct 6, 2015	14:00
35	"But not a drop to drink…"	Oct 12, 2015	15:00
36	"Growing hay a world away"	Oct 19, 2015	12:00
37	"Water bills bleeding them dry"	Oct 27, 2015	10:00
38	"[Update] Assault on justice"	Nov 2, 2015	18:00
39	"Exposing the horrors on The Mountain"	Nov 9, 2015	22:00
40	"Inappropriate love triangle blossoms at rehab"	Nov 16, 2015	16:00
41	"Meet the Brennicks"	Nov 23, 2015	19:00
42	"A special message from our sound designer and engineer"	Nov 25, 2015	2:00
43	"The Wright family's all right (Lakeview Extra)"	Dec 1, 2015	9:00
44	"The fowl business of salmonella"	Dec 8, 2015	21:00
45	"From the battlefields to the strawberry fields"	Dec 14, 2015	13:00
46	"When working conditions are ripe for change"	Dec 21, 2015	18:00
47	"Decoding discrimination in America's temp industry"	Jan 10, 2016	53:00
48	"Cat Fight"	Jan 17, 2016	51:00
49	"Do not drink: The water crisis in Flint, Michigan"	Jan 25, 2016	54:00
50	"Pumped on Trump"	Jan 31, 2016	52:00
51	"Sick on the inside: Behind bars in immigrant-only prisons"	Feb7, 2016	54:00
52	"Another look at the perilous price of American energy"	Feb 14, 2016	54:00
54	"Mighty Ike"	Mar 6, 2016	54:00
55	"When Mad Men meet dark money"	March 13, 2016	52:00
56	"Alleged cult leader plays shell game with US foreign aid"	March 20, 2016	53:00
57	"New day dawning on the night shift"	March 27, 2016	53:00
58	"Billion-dollar scam"	April 4, 2016	50:00
59	"Kids crossing borders – alone"	April 10, 2016	52:00
60	"[Update] Decoding discrimination in America's temp industry"	April 18, 2016	53:00
61	"Guns and America's murder board"	April 24, 2016	52:00
62	"The price of admission"	May 1, 2016	53:00
63	"Women's sports: A man's game"	May 8, 2016	58:00
64	"[Update] A mountain of misconduct"	May 15, 2016	53:00
65	"[Update] Alleged cult leader plays shell game with US foreign aid"	May 29, 2016	52:00
66	"Lawless Lands"	June 5, 2016	52:00
67	"Poison lurking in schools"	June 12, 2016	52:00
68	"After Orlando"	June 19, 2016	52:00
69	"Who's getting rich off your student debt?"	July 1, 2016	53:00
70	"Bordering on insecurity"	July 8, 2016	54:00
71	"[Update] Eyes on Cops"	July 14, 2016	18:00
72	"[Update] Farm to fork: Uncovering hazards in our food systems"	July 22, 2016	52:00
73	"[Update] Mighty Ike"	July 29, 2016	52:00
74	"From A to Zika"	Aug 5, 2016	52:00
75	"[Update] Cat Fight"	Aug 19, 2016	52:00
76	"[Update] Sick on the inside: Behind bars in immigrant-only prisons"	Aug 26, 2016	53:00
77	"[Update] The man inside: Four months as a prison guard"	Sept 2, 2016	51:00
78	"No choice: Failing America's veterans"	Sept 16, 2016	51:00
79	"Voting rights – and wrongs"	Sept 30, 2016	52:00
80	"America's Ring of Fire"	Oct 7, 2016	52:00
81	"[Update] Billion-dollar scam"	Oct 14, 2016	51:00
82	"How to (really) steal an election"	Oct 21, 2016	53:00
83	"And justice for some"	Oct 28, 2016	54:00
84	"Host of problems"	Nov 4, 2016	53:00
85	"A frank conversation with a white nationalist"	Nov 10, 2016	24:00
86	"The secret Trump voter"	Nov 11, 2016	55:00
87	"Glare of the spotlight"	Nov 18, 2016	53:00
88	"A welfare check"	Nov 25, 2016	54:00
89	"Secrets of the Watchtower"	Dec 9, 2016	51:00
90	"Turbulent times, turbulent skies"	Dec 16, 2016	53:00
91	"The Pentagon Papers: Secrets, lies and leaks"	Dec 23, 2016	54:00
92	"The year in Reveal"	Dec 30, 2016	53:00
93	"America's digital dumping ground"	Jan 6, 2017	45:00
94	"Water wars"	Jan 13, 2017	53:00
95	"Dropped and dismissed: Child sex abuse lost in the system"	Jan 21, 2017	53:00
96	"Split down the middle"	Jan 27, 2017	52:00
97	"Trial by fire"	Feb 3, 2017	55:00
98	"School haze"	Feb 17, 2017	55:00
99	"The religious freedom loophole"	Feb 24, 2017	55:00
100	"Al Letson Reveals: Vicente Fox on Trump's wall"	March 1, 2017	18:00
101	"Up against the wall"	March 3, 2017	54:00
102	"Al Letson Reveals: Sebastian Gorka on America"	March 8, 2017	13:00
103	"Richard Spencer's cotton farms"	March 17, 2017	55:00
104	"Al Letson Reveals: Former NATO official imagines war with Russia"	March 22, 2017	11:00
105	"Against their will"	March 24, 2017	55:00
106	"The mystery of Mountain Jane Doe"	March 31, 2017	54:00
107	"If you can't afford a lawyer"	April 7, 2017	54:00
108	"Al Letson Reveals: The color of feminism"	April 12, 2017	16:00
109	"Toxic burden"	April 14, 2017	52:00
110	"Russia's new scapegoats"	April 21, 2017	53:00
111	"Running from cops"	April 28, 2017	53:00
112	"What cops aren't learning"	May 5, 2017	53:00
113	"Standing Rock and beyond"	May 12, 2017	53:00
114	"The man inside: Four months as a prison guard"	May 22, 2017	54:00
115	"The kids aren't all right"	May 26, 2017	55:00
116	"Misconceptions"	June 2, 2017	52:00
117	"After the bubble burst"	June 9, 2017	53:00
118	"America's ring of fire"	June 16, 2017	52:00
119	"Trial and terror"	June 23, 2017	53:00
120	"The smuggler"	July 7, 2017	52:00
121	"Al Letson Reveals: Roger Stone"	July 13, 2017	22:00
122	"No where to run"	July 14, 2017	53:00
123	"Deadly waters"	July 21, 2017	53:00
124	"No country for sanctuary seekers"	Aug 4, 2017	52:00
125	"Hate on the march: white nationalism in the Trump era"	Aug 18, 2017	52:00
126	"Follow the money: Citizen sleuths investigate"	Aug 25, 2017	19:00
127	"Rise of a movement"	Aug 28, 2017	15:00
128	"The perfect storm"	Sept 1, 2017	54:00
129	"The rise of the new German right"	Sept 15, 2017	53:00
130	"Street fight: A new wave of political violence"	Sept 23, 2017	54:00
131	"Does the Time Fit the Crime?"	Sept 29, 2017	52:00
132	"All work. No pay. Life at a rehab work camp."	Oct 6, 2017	55:00
133	"Al Letson Reveals: The fight to end affirmative action in higher education"	Oct 11, 2017	19:00
134	"Access Denied: The Fight for Public Education"	Oct 13, 2017	53:00
135	"Too Many Pills"	Oct 20, 2017	36:00
136	"Heroin Diaries"	Oct 25, 2017	15:00
137	"Inside Trump's Immigration Crackdown"	Oct 27, 2017	54:00
138	"The Paradise Papers"	Nov 5, 2017	53:00
139	"Losing ground"	Nov 10, 2017	51:00
140	"Pizzagate: A slice of fake news"	Nov 17, 2017	53:00
141	"Her own devices: Is a contraceptive implant making us sick?"	Nov 24, 2017	51:00
142	"Where criminals get their guns"	Dec 1, 2017	51:00
143	"Institutions of Higher Earning"	Dec 8, 2017	51:00
144	"The Pentagon Papers: Secrets, lies and leaks"	Dec 15, 2017	51:00
145	"Fire and Justice"	Dec 22, 2017	51:00
146	"A Revealing Year"	Dec 29, 2017	51:00
147	"The Tide is High"	Jan 5, 2018	51:00
148	"The mystery of Mountain Jane Doe"	Jan 12, 2018	51:00
149	"#MeToo: Rape on the Night Shift"	Jan 19, 2018	51:00
150	"Too Many Pills"	Jan 26, 2018	51:00
151	"How Bernie Made Off: Are we safe from the next Ponzi scheme?"	Feb 2, 2018	51:00
152	"Dropped and dismissed: Child sex abuse lost in the system"	Feb 9, 2018	50:16
153	"The red line: Racial disparities in lending"	Feb 16, 2018	51:00
154	"My Town, Chi-Town"	Feb 23, 2018	51:00
155	"Deja Nuke: Return of the Nuclear Threat"	Mar 2, 2018	51:00
156	"Warning System Down: California's Deadliest Fires"	Mar 9, 2018	35:13
157	"Built to Burn"	Mar 13, 2018	17:08
158	"The kids aren't all right"	Mar 16, 2018	51:00
159	"Where criminals get their guns"	Mar 23, 2018	51:00
160	"Poisoned, ignored and evicted: The perils of living with lead"	Mar 30, 2018	39:14
161	"Full of Lead: How Bullets are Poisoning Eagles"	Apr 4, 2018	14:46
162	"Checking into President Trump's Washington DC Hotel"	Apr 6, 2018	50:25
163	"Trump's Mystery Mansion"	Apr 11, 2018	12:50
164	"Tesla and Beyond: Hidden Problems of Silicon Valley"	Apr 13, 2018	50:59
165	"Trumping Hate"	Apr 20, 2018	50:35
166	"Institutions of Higher Earning (rebroadcast)"	Apr 27, 2018	51:00
167	"More to the Story: Redlining"	May 4, 2018	17:56
168	"More to the Story: Wildfires"	May 9, 2018	19:48
169	"Reveal Presents: The View from Room 205"	May 11, 2018	51:00
170	"Across the Desert and the Sea"	May 18, 2018	50:34
171	"What cops aren't learning (rebroadcast)"	May 26, 2018	51:00
172	"Inside a Rehab Empire"	May 30, 2018	26:31
173	"Cops on a Crime Spree"	June 1, 2018	53:12
174	"Reveal Answers Your Questions About Immigration"	June 8, 2018	51:00
175	"Losing Ground (rebroadcast)"	June 16, 2018	50:04
176	TBA	TBA	TBA
269	"When Lighting the Voids"	December 26, 2020	54:59

== See also ==
- Institute for Nonprofit News (member)
