= CulinaryCorps =

American non-profit organization

CulinaryCorps, Inc.
- Founded: 2006
- Founder: Christine Carroll (Founder)
- Type: Public charity
- Purpose: Service Organization for Culinary Professionals
- Location: Washington, D.C.
- Key people: Christine Carroll - Founding Director; Viviana Acosta-Padial - Program Coordinator
- Website: culinarycorps.org

CulinaryCorps is an American non-profit organization that recruits culinary students and professionals to volunteer their professional skills on trips to communities in the United States.

== History ==
The organization was founded by Christine Carroll following a volunteer trip to New Orleans after Hurricane Katrina. Carroll and other experienced culinary professionals were helping to repaint a local school when she conceived the idea of a food-focused volunteer organization. Upon returning home she launched CulinaryCorps to enable cooks to volunteer their professional skills to assist communities in need.

Carroll coined the term "culanthropy" (a portmanteau of the words "culinary" and "philanthropy") to describe the organization's brand of food-focused volunteerism.

== Function ==
The organization recruits culinary students and professionals in the culinary industry to volunteer on week-long trips to communities in the United States. CulinaryCorps members have volunteered on trips to New Orleans, Louisiana; the Mississippi Gulf Coast; and Puerto Rico.

== Impact ==
In its first sixteen months, the organization launched five volunteer trips during which, more than 3,500 meals were prepared by 76 volunteer cooks from across the United States. Since then, the organization has launched additional trips to New Orleans, the Mississippi Gulf Coast, and Puerto Rico. Each volunteer trip lasts about a week.

During each volunteer trip, the organization's team partners with a variety of local organizations to perform food-related projects for the local community's benefit. For example, in the New Orleans and Mississippi Gulf Coast regions, CulinaryCorps has partnered with many local and nonprofit organizations, including:

- Habitat for Humanity, where CulinaryCorps chefs cooked for hundreds of resident Habitat volunteers rebuilding homes following Hurricane Katrina;
- The Edible Schoolyard at the Samuel J. Green Charter School in New Orleans, where CulinaryCorps volunteers instructed students on food, cooking, and nutrition;
- Café Reconcile in New Orleans, where CulinaryCorps volunteers cooked meals and performed career mentoring with culinary students;
- Real Food Gulf Coast, which, together with CulinaryCorps, designed and launched an after-school cooking club curriculum for children in the Ocean Springs, Mississippi School District; and
- Liberty's Kitchen, a culinary training and job placement program for at-risk teens in New Orleans, where CulinaryCorps volunteers cooked for the opening gala celebration.
