= Liberty's Kitchen =

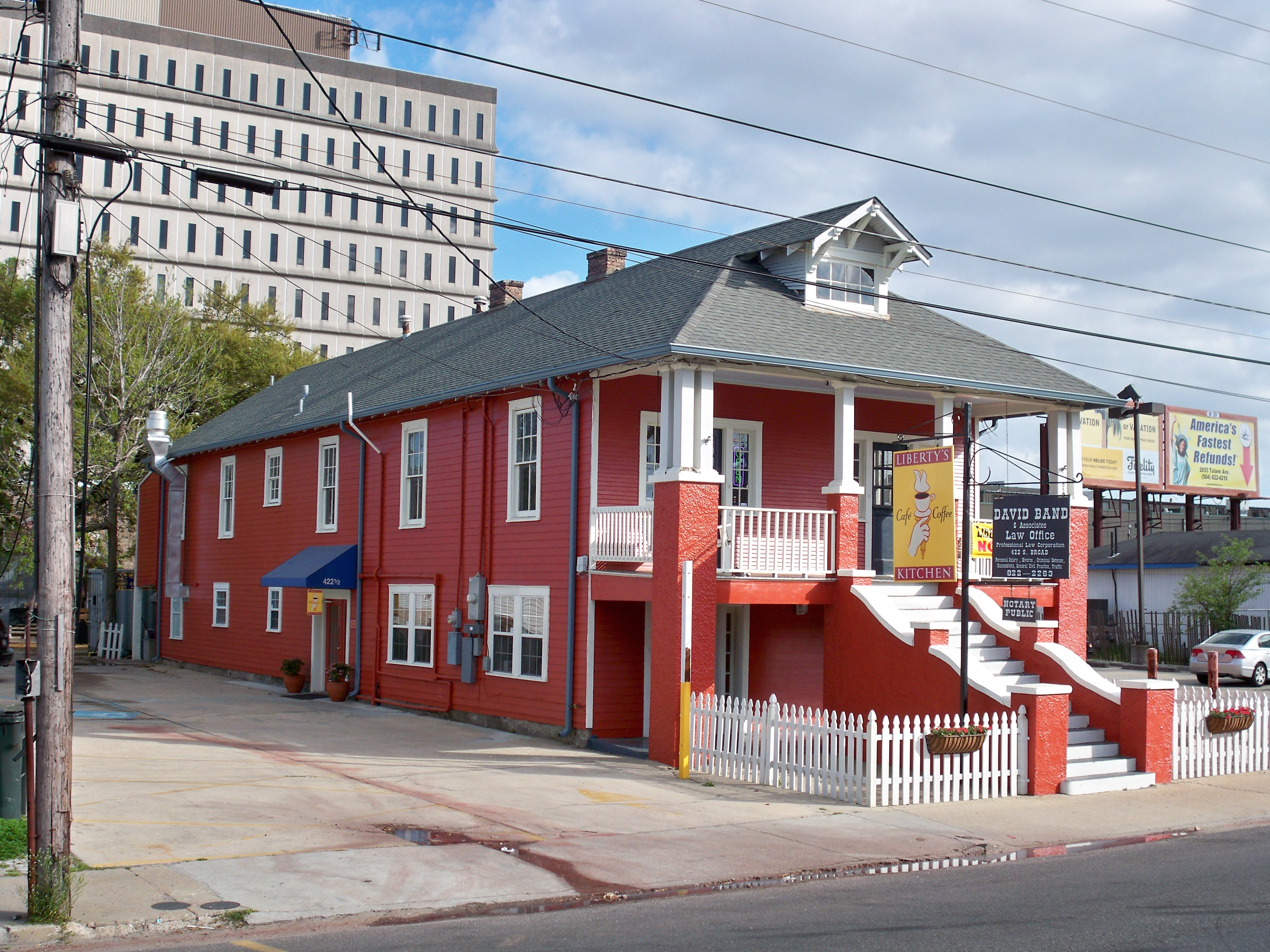
Liberty's Kitchen exterior, near the intersection of Tulane Avenue and South Broad St. in New Orleans, Louisiana

Liberty's Kitchen is a non-profit organization, located in the Mid-City New Orleans Neighborhood. Liberty's Kitchen opened its doors in April 2009 after a grant from the W. K. Kellogg Foundation. This nonprofit cafe doubles as a training program for teens and young adults who want to change the course of their lives. Liberty's Kitchen provides their students with marketable job skills and experience, and allows them to learn the culinary techniques behind cooking from scratch.

== History ==
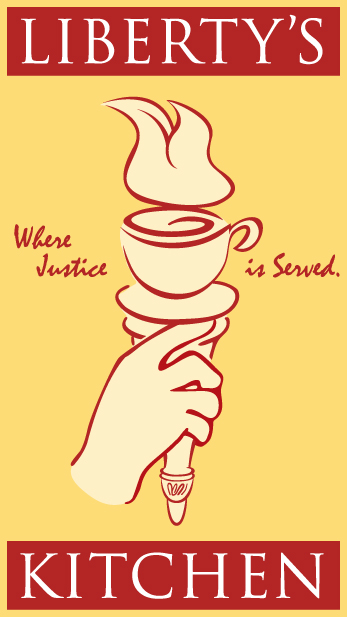
Liberty's Kitchen Logo

Liberty's Kitchen was founded in 2008 by Janet Gorence Davas. It began operations in April 2009 as a social entrepreneurship supporting its sustainability with teaching-focused businesses. Liberty's Kitchen took its first trainees in the Youth Development Program in July 2009 and have since graduated and placed several young people into employment or higher education. Since launching the training program, over 400 participant applications have been submitted.

Liberty's Kitchen expanded in 2014 with its move to the ReFresh Project at 300 North Broad Street. They moved to a new 10,000 square foot facility in the ReFresh Project to assist vulnerable New Orleans youth aged 16-24. The ReFresh expansion offers both the internal capacity and the community collaborations to dramatically increase the number of youth empowered to create healthy futures.

In 2015, Liberty's Kitchen re-opened the Green Dot Cafe within the Rosa F. Keller Library and Community Center offering paninis, smoothies, coffee, and assorted snacks.

In June 2025, Liberty's Kitchen closed citing financial challenges and changing priorities from donors.

== Mission ==
Liberty's Kitchen seeks young people who demonstrate positive traits, such as leadership or willingness to change, that could help them progress in the Youth Development Program. The objective is to graduate students with a sense of purpose and confidence and the skills and tools to succeed in gainful employment by providing a path to self-sufficiency through food service-based training, leadership, education, and life skills programs.

== Accomplishments ==
Liberty's Kitchen has received donations and support from some of the nation's largest foundations – the W.K. Kellogg Foundation, Baptist Community Ministries, the Emeril Lagasse Foundation, and the Goldring Foundation.

=== New Orleans College Prep ===
In August 2010, Liberty's Kitchen initiated the Healthy School Lunch Program providing freshly prepared nutritious meals to New Orleans' public schoolchildren on a daily basis. Liberty's Kitchen won the bid and contract for Food Service Management at New Orleans College Prep Charter School to serve over 600 students breakfast, lunch and snack daily.

Chef Syrena Johnson graduated from Liberty's Kitchen's program in 2010 and went on to win Food Network's show Chopped.

== Partners ==
Liberty's Kitchen has partnered with many organizations in the New Orleans area, including:

- Tulane University School of Public Health and Tropical Medicine
- New Orleans Providing Literacy to All Youth (NOPLAY)
- New Orleans Metropolitan Human Services District.
- New Orleans Covenant House
- Ochsner Medical Center Endocrinology Department (Alan Burshell), New Orleans
