= Dalton Delan =

American writer (born 1954)

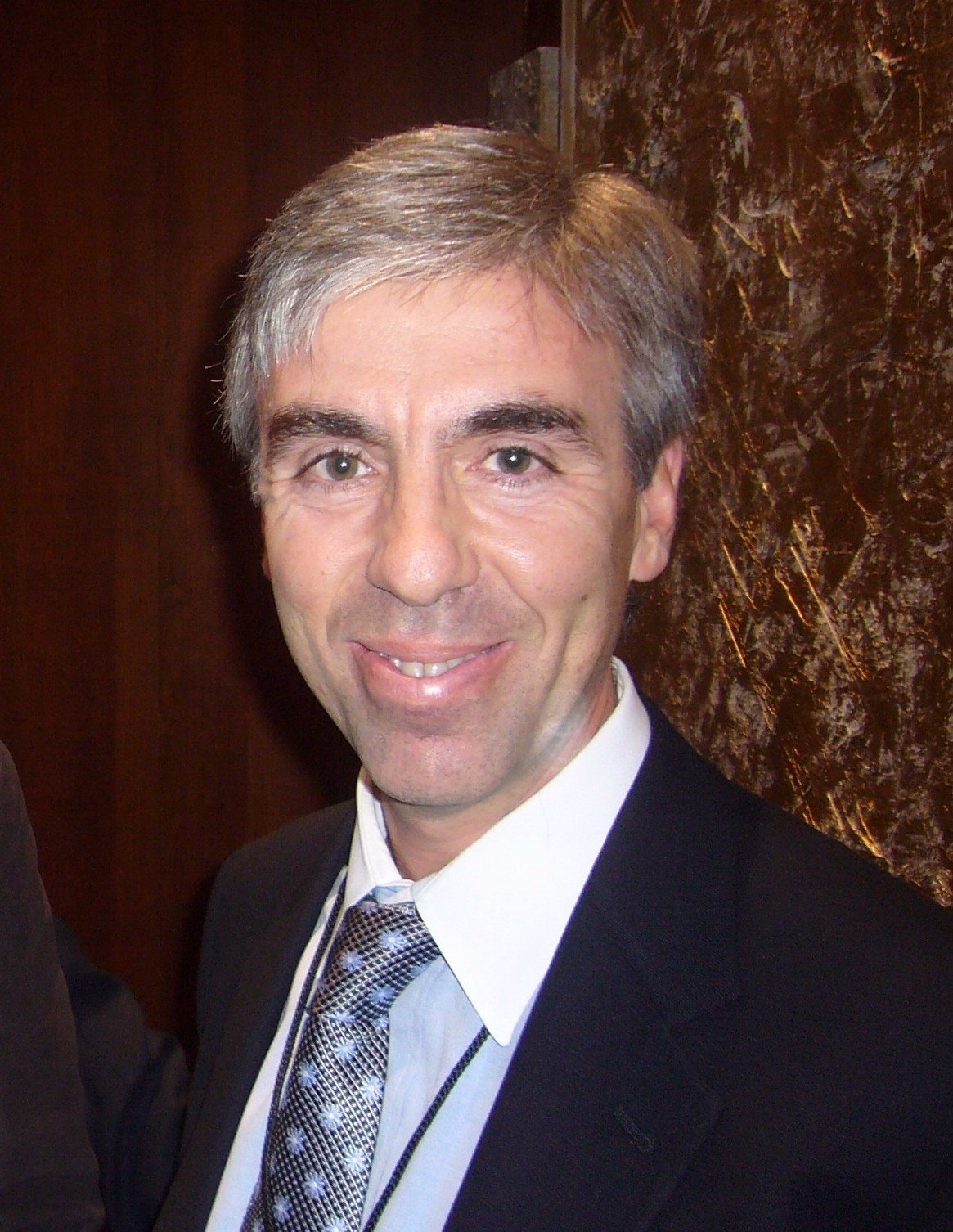
- Delan in 2006
- Born: August 5, 1954 (age 71); Manhattan, New York, United States
- Occupations: Writer, columnist, television producer

Dalton Delan (born August 5, 1954) is an American writer, syndicated columnist, and television producer. He pens his syndicated column, the Unspin Room, for the Pulitzer Prize winning newspaper The Berkshire Eagle. His work with PBS and Sundance have won him numerous awards for documentaries and primetime shows. A number of his projects include working alongside notable figures like actor Robert Redford, Ken Burns and Henry Louis Gates Jr. Delan oversaw the production of sixteen In Performance at the White House programs in collaboration with the Obama administration, as well as several under the Bush and Clinton administrations years prior. As executive producer, Delan brought music giants like Bob Dylan, Paul McCartney, Mick Jagger, Stevie Wonder, Paul McCartney, Burt Bacharach, and Carole King to the White House. The final program under the Obama administration, The Smithsonian Salutes Ray Charles, is documented on YouTube as "WETA at the White House", features singers like Demi Lovato, Usher, and Anthony Hamilton.

Delan was an executive producer of the Mark Twain Prize for American Humor, presented by the Kennedy Center to notable names in humor and comedy. Delan was also co-creator and was an executive producer of the Library of Congress Gershwin Prize for Popular Music, whose first recipient, Paul Simon, was presented the award in a ceremony at the Warner Theater. Delan's most recent work had him as the managing director and chief content officer of One Mind All Media, the media division for the brain health non-profit One Mind.

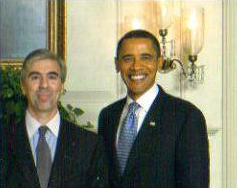
Delan and President Barack Obama at the "Red, White and Blues" concert at the White House on February 21, 2012

== Early life ==
Delan was born in Manhattan, New York, to attorney and stock broker Daniel Delan, and advertising executive and artist, Stephanie Lord Delan. He has one older brother, Douglas Scott Delan, who works in the educational field.

Delan attended Phillips Exeter Academy alongside subsequent music, film, and television veterans Bobby Shriver, Miles Chapin and Benmont Tench (former keyboard player for the late Tom Petty). Upon early graduation from Exeter, Delan attended Columbia University in New York, making the Dean's List both semesters. As a sophomore, Delan was recruited to Princeton University as part of an effort to strengthen the English Department's student body. During his academic career at Princeton University, Delan was a member of the Phi Beta Kappa society, and won the Junior English Prize, as well as the Senior Thesis Prize in English. He was an active journalist during this time, writing for the Henry David Thoreau Journal, as editor of The Nassau Lit, and as a writer and critic for The Daily Princetonian. Delan graduated from Princeton University summa cum laude in 1976. Following college, Delan began his career as a staff writer and editor for Time-Life Books, first in Manhattan and then in Washington D.C.

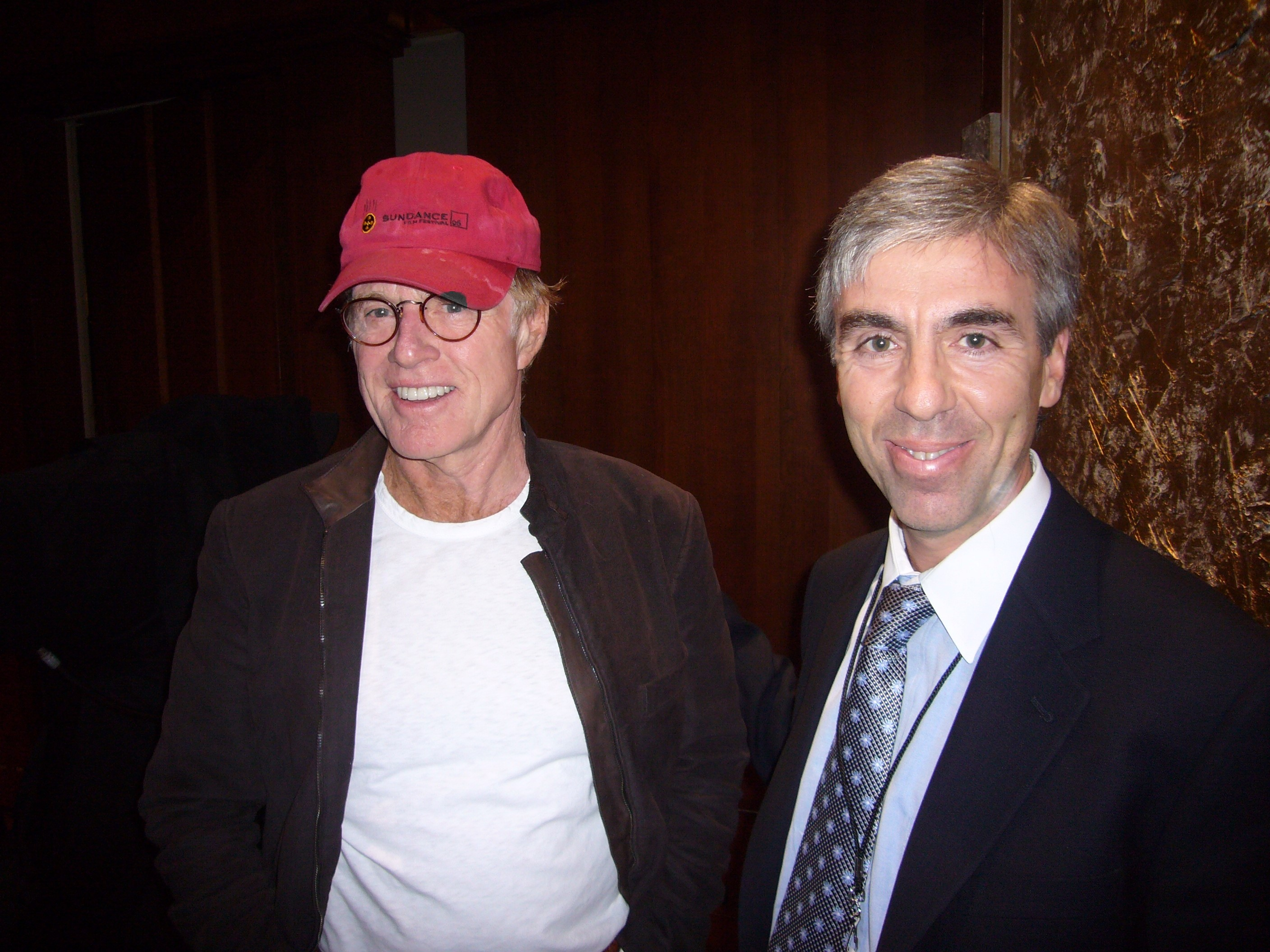
Delan in rehearsals with Robert Redford on October 15, 2006, for the Kennedy Center Mark Twain Prize for American Humor, honoring Neil Simon.

== Career in television ==
=== Awards ===
Organization	Award	Title	Year
National Capital/Chesapeake Bay Emmy Awards	Outstanding Program Achievement	Worldtalk	2003
The Columbia School of Journalism	Dupont Columbia Award	Jihad	2006-2007
The Columbia School of Journalism	Dupont Columbia Award	Through Deaf Eyes	2006-2007
The Peabody Award	Peabody Awards	Washington Week	2008
The Emmy Award	News and Documentary Emmy Award for Outstanding Science, Technology and Nature Programming	The Mysterious Human Heart	2009
The Emmy Award	News and Documentary Emmy Award for Outstanding Informational Programming	America at a Crossroads: Operation Homecoming	2009
The Peabody Award	Peabody Award	Latino Americans	2013

=== ABC News ===
Delan got his start in television in 1979, working for ABC News in the ABC News Closeup documentary unit under Pamela Hill. There, he helped produce investigative reports with several big names in media, including a film featuring writer and historian William Manchester, and hosts Hugh Downs, Peter Jennings, and Barbara Walters. Titles that Delan worked on include "After the Sexual Revolution" and "Growing Old in America". "Rain of Terror", another of Delan's works, was deemed by a The Wall Street Journal editorial as "the single best piece of television journalism we've ever witnessed."

=== HBO and Lifetime Television ===
In 1986, Delan was hired at HBO to help build and serve as an executive producer of the America Undercover documentary series, as well as informational family programming specials. During his time working at HBO, Delan was known for recruiting filmmakers such as Alan and Susan Raymond, Jon Alpert and Albert Maysles, and working on programs featuring TV personalities like Walter Cronkite and Mary Tyler Moore. Delan was hired by Lifetime Television in 1990 to develop a variety of series and specials ranging from game shows and documentaries, to live events and their first primetime nonfiction series, "Confessions of Crime", as well as working with acclaimed actors and actresses, such as Glenn Close on the documentary "Broken Hearts, Broken Homes".

=== The Travel Channel ===
When Landmark Communications in Norfolk, Virginia, purchased The Travel Channel, Delan was hired in 1992 to help restart and grow the network, based in Atlanta. In addition to bringing in personalities such as Charles Kuralt, he also premiered the long-running series Globe Trekker (originally titled Lonely Planet).

=== The Sundance Channel ===
In 1996 the founder of the Sundance Film Festival, Robert Redford, approached Delan to be the Creative Director and Executive Vice President of the Sundance Channel —a venture between Redford, Showtime, and Polygram. Working directly with Redford and Festival director Geoffrey Gilmore, Delan produced live broadcasts from the Sundance Film Festival in Park City, Utah. Delan also worked with filmmakers to develop original films (Marina Zenovich on "Independent's Day" and Leslie McCleave on "Meeting Marty"), as well as with prominent actors like Jon Cryer, Susan Sarandon, and Meg Tilly.

=== Public Media ===
From late 1998 to late 2019, Delan was the Executive Vice President and Chief Programming Officer of WETA Washington D.C., which he took from third to second largest producing station for PBS (Public Broadcasting Service), and the flagship public television station in the nation's capital. At WETA, Delan worked with Sharon Percy Rockefeller, wife of John Davison "Jay" Rockefeller IV, retired senior Senator from West Virginia. In 1999, Ken Bode's contract as moderator on the popular news discussion talk show, "Washington Week in Review" was not renewed. Despite criticism from Bode and his supporters, Delan held his ground in the ensuing media firestorm, and temporarily brought back long-time moderator Paul Duke before naming journalist Gwen Ifill as moderator. This move would help create a newly successful Washington Week with Gwen Ifill. Upon Ifill's death, Delan brought in Washington Post reporter Robert Costa as moderator. Delan collaborated with Kerry Kennedy, the daughter of Robert F. Kennedy, on an adaptation of her book Speak Truth to Power, which was filmed onstage at the Kennedy Center, with readings by Sigourney Weaver, John Malkovich and a number of other distinguished actors. Delan also served as Executive in Charge of Production for WETA on the films of Ken Burns. In 2003, Jerry Nachman, then-New York Post editor and editor-in-chief of MSNBC, called Delan "the so-called father of reality TV."

== One Mind All Media ==
After more than two decades in public television, in early 2020 Delan launched a media division, One Mind All Media, for One Mind (501(c)3), a leader in brain health research and workplace best mental health practices. As its first Managing Director and Chief Content Officer, Delan cited the goal of telling "the stories of the most pressing issue of our time, brain and mental health". President of One Mind, Brandon Staglin, stated "with Dalton's tremendous acumen and media experience, ONE MIND ALL MEDIA is primed to transform popular culture toward hope, compassion and action to help the sixty million Americans struggling with mental health challenges."

== Syndicated Column ==
Delan writes a biweekly syndicated column, The Unspin Room, for Pulitzer Prize-winning daily, The Berkshire Eagle, whose roots reach back to 1789. Delan's column explores the intersection of culture, media, current events, and institutional memory.

== Books ==
In 2012, Delan wrote a children's book, Christmas Rose, illustrated by Yolanda Prinsloo, which is available as an audiobook on YouTube. Delan wrote the entry "Bob Dylan Cover Songs" in "The Enlightened Bracketologist: The Final Four of Everything," edited by Mark Reiter and Richard Sandomir. Delan was also Editor of "Positively Prince Street" in 1979.

== Personal life ==
While working at ABC News in 1981, Delan met his future wife Stacey Lauren Delan (née Berson) (born 1958) of New York City. They married on August 11, 1982. Together, they have two children, Dashiell (born 1988) and Jesse (born 1991).

== Selected filmography ==
Title	Year	Network	Credited as
Growing Old in America	1985	ABC	Field Producer
Medal of Honor	2008	PBS	Executive Producer
Mark Twain	2001	PBS	Executive in Charge of Production
After the Sexual Revolution	1986	ABC	Field Producer
People Like Us: Social Class in America	2002	PBS	Executive in Charge
Bioterror: Coping with a New Reality	2002	PBS	Executive Producer
The Irish Gala	2001	PBS	Executive Producer
The President's Own	2002	PBS	Executive Producer
A Concert for America	2002	PBS	Executive Producer
Echoes from the White House	2002	PBS	Executive Producer
Yeltsin	2000	PBS	Executive in Charge of Production
A Force More Powerful: A Century of Non-Violent Conflict	1999	PBS	Executive Producer
There Once was a Town	2001	PBS	Executive Producer
John Singer Sargent: Outside the Frame	2009	WETA	Executive Producer
Speak Truth to Power	2001	PBS	Executive Producer
The Americanos Concert	2002	PBS	Executive in Charge
Independent's Day	1998	Sundance Channel	Executive Producer
Discovered at Sundance	1997	PBS	Executive Producer
Dangerous Propositions	1992	Lifetime	Executive Producer
Jennifer's in Jail	1992	Lifetime	Executive Producer
Shattered Lullabies	1992	Lifetime	Executive Producer
Broken Hearts, Broken Homes	1993	Lifetime	Executive Producer
How to Prevent a Heart Attack	1990	HBO	Executive Producer
Child of Rage: A Storyof Abuse	1990	HBO	Executive Producer
Buy Me That! A Kid's Survival Guide to TV Advertising	1990	HBO	Executive Producer
Warning: Food May be Hazardous to Your Health	1990	HBO	Producer
Horatio's Drive: America's First Road Trip	2004	PBS	Executive in Charge of Production
In Performance at the White House	1999-2016	PBS	Executive Producer
Jazz	2001	PBS	Executive in Charge of Production
Motown Sound	2012	PBS	Executive Producer
Tucker Carlson: Unfiltered	2005	PBS	Executive Producer
Through Deaf Eyes	2007	PBS	Executive Producer
Jihad	2001	PBS	Executive Producer
Struggle for the Soul of Islam: Inside Indonesia	2007	PBS	Executive Producer
Unforgivable Blackness: Rise and Fall of Jack Johnson	2005	PBS	Executive in Charge of Production
