= National Public Affairs Center for Television =

American television production company

- Formerly: National Public Affairs Broadcast Center (1971)
- Type: Nonprofit organization
- Founded: August 24, 1971; 55 years ago
- Founder: James Karayn
- Defunct: January 1976
- Successor: WETA-TV
- Headquarters: Arlington County, Virginia, United States
- Products: Television news
- Parent: Corporation for Public Broadcasting (1971–1972); Ford Foundation (1971–1972); WETA-TV (1972–1976)

National Public Affairs Center for Television (NPACT) was a production company based in Washington, D.C. It was originally formed in 1971 as National Public Affairs Broadcast Center by the Corporation for Public Broadcasting and the Ford Foundation to supply news programming for PBS. It was sold to WETA in 1972, and brought its programming under the WETA name in 1976 after the NPACT name was phased out.

== History ==
In 1971, the Corporation for Public Broadcasting and the Ford Foundation, who owned PBS, established the National Public Affairs Broadcast Center to supply its news programming to PBS. The company was headed by James Karayn, who ran the company. The company is based in Washington, D.C., used the facilities of WETA-TV and took over production of two shows from WETA itself, namely Washington Week in Review and Thirty Minutes With...

Later in 1971, the company was renamed to National Public Affairs Center for Television, and hired two men from NBC News, Robert MacNeil and Sander Vanocur, who was hired to be employed by NPACT, to ran the operations. MacNeil became moderator of Washington Week in Review. Next, MacNeil and Vanocur had anchored A Public Affair, which was designed for the 1972 presidential election, for PBS.

In 1972, the company was sold to Greater Washington Educational Telecommunications Association, who owns the station WETA-TV. All separate operations of NPACT was merged with WETA, with news and public affairs productions continue to be produced under the NPACT name. Around the time, CPB and Ford decided to cut funding for National Public Affairs Center for Television after WETA acquired the company.

In 1973, Vanocur left and succeeded as anchor by Jim Lehrer. The company made its biggest success when two of the top-performing NPACT anchors Robert MacNeil and Jim Lehrer covered the gavel-to-gavel coverage of the Watergate hearings on PBS, which earned NPACT and the duo an Emmy Award and became a ratings success. The success led the formation of The Robert MacNeil Report, which later evolved into today's PBS News Hour, which still airs to the day. The company tried to emulate the success with Washington Straight Talk in 1973 and Washington Connection in 1974, but none of them lasted as long as the flagship Washington Week in Review.

In 1974, MacNeil left and replaced by another former NBC anchor Paul Duke, who also became moderator of Washington Week in Review. Therefore NPACT made another smash success, a follow-up of the Watergate covergate with coverage of Nixon's impeachment hearings, with Paul Duke and Jim Lehrer, which became another ratings hit on PBS, but nowhere on the level of the earlier Watergate coverage.

In 1975, James Karayn resigned as president of National Public Affairs Center for Television, because of philosophical differences. Jim Lehrer later left NPACT to became Washington correspondent for The Robert MacNeil Report. Around the time, NPACT decided to produce a national version of Martin Agronsky's show Evening Edition for PBS as its daily offering, but it failed in the ratings. The company as a whole, was folded into WETA-TV in early 1976, bringing all the productions under the WETA name.

== Programs ==
- Washington Week in Review (1971–1976)
- Thirty Minutes With... (1971–1973)
- Washington Straight Talk (1973–1975)
- Washington Connection (1974)
- Martin Agronsky's Evening Edition (1975–1976)
