= Libby Fischer Hellmann =

American crime fiction writer

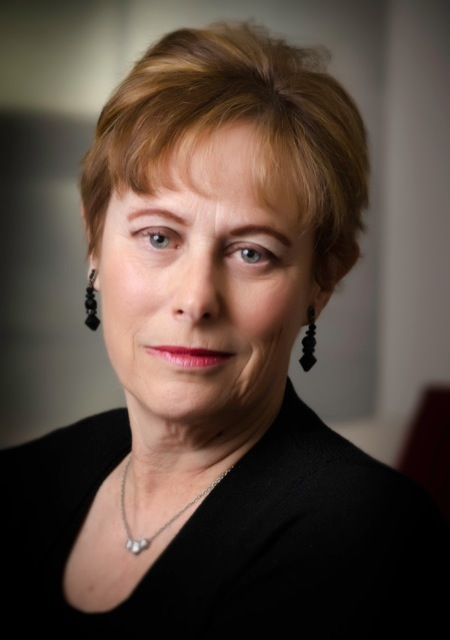
- Author Libby Fischer Hellmann
- Education: University of Pennsylvania (BA); New York University (MFA)
- Writing career
- Period: 2002–present
- Genre: Mystery fiction
- Website: www.libbyhellmann.com

Libby Fischer Hellmann is an American crime fiction writer who currently resides in Chicago, Illinois. Most of her novels and stories are set in Chicago; the Chicago Sun-Times notes that she "grew up in Washington, D.C., but she has embraced her adopted home of Chicago with the passion of a convert."

== Early years ==
Raised in Washington D.C., Hellmann attended the National Cathedral School, followed by the University of Pennsylvania. After graduating with a BA in History, she enrolled in New York University's Graduate Program in Film and Television, earning an MFA in 1972.

She worked in television news as an assistant film editor for NBC in New York City, then relocated to D.C. where she joined National Public Affairs Center for Television, the public affairs unit that first paired Robert MacNeil with Jim Lehrer. Among other programs, she worked on the rebroadcast of the Watergate hearings in 1973. Hellmann also spent time at TVN, the news syndication service underwritten by Joseph Coors, and NBC in Washington, DC. In 1978 she joined Burson-Marsteller's Chicago creative department where she worked until 1985. She founded Fischer Hellmann Communications in 1985, which specializes in video production, speech writing, and spokesperson training.

== Career in fiction ==
Hellmann's first crime fiction novel, An Eye For Murder, was published in hardcover in 2002 by Poisoned Pen Press and in paperback by Berkley Prime Crime. It was nominated for an Anthony for Best First, and won the Best First Readers Choice Award at Chicago's Love is Murder conference. Its protagonist, video producer and single mother Ellie Foreman, was featured in three additional novels.

Her second crime fiction series, featuring Private Investigator Georgia Davis, debuted in 2008 with Easy Innocence. Davis had been introduced in the 2004 Ellie Foreman novel An Image of Death, and Hellman said she knew immediately that she would want to write a book with Davis as protagonist. Her next book, Doubleback (October 2009, Bleak House Books), features both Davis and Foreman as co-protagonists. ToxiCity, a prequel to the Georgia Davis series, was published in 2011. A fourth thriller, Nobody's Child was released in 2014.

In 2012, Easy Innocence was translated into Spanish and published under the title Inocencia Fácil.

In 2010 she released Set the Night on Fire, published by Allium Press, a stand-alone thriller that goes back, in part, to the late 1960s in Chicago. A second stand-alone, A Bitter Veil, set largely in Revolutionary Iran, was published by Allium Press in 2012. Hellmann published "Havana Lost" in 2013. Although these three books are each stand-alone thrillers, they all deal with revolution and how it affects individuals, communities, cultures, and countries. Hellmann calls the three her "Revolution Trilogy."

Hellmann has published nearly 20 short stories, most of which are available in a collection called Nice Girl Does Noir. In 2013, this collection was translated into Italian and published under the title Ragazza Insospettabile Scrive Noir.

In 2007 Hellmann edited Chicago Blues, a short story anthology featuring over 20 prominent Chicago crime fiction authors including Stuart Kaminsky, Sara Paretsky, Barbara D'Amato, Sean Chercover, Marcus Sakey, J. A. Konrath, Max Allan Collins, and others.

In 2006 Hellmann founded The Outfit Collective, a blog that was shared by eleven Chicago crime fiction authors. According to Blog Rank, it was the #7 mystery novels blog on the Web.

== Awards and honors ==
Hellmann has been nominated for several major mystery awards, including the Shamus Award, the Daphne du Maurier Award for Excellence in Mystery/Suspense, the Anthony Award (twice) and the Agatha. She has won the Readers Choice/Lovey Award multiple times. Three of her novels have also been finalists in the Thriller of the Year/Foreword Reviews Magazine awards. Her short story "Letters from Havana" won Honorable Mention in the Saturday Evening Post Short Story contest for 2014.

- An Eye For Murder – Anthony Award nomination for Best First Novel; winner, Best First Novel, Readers Choice Awards (Love is Murder conference)
- A Picture of Guilt – Finalist, Ben Franklin Award, Mystery/Suspense; winner, Best Traditional Mystery, Readers Choice Awards (Love is Murder conference)
- A Shot to Die For – Winner, Best Traditional Mystery, Readers Choice Awards (Love is Murder conference)
- House Rules (short story in Murder in Vegas anthology) – Anthony Award and Agatha Award nominations, Best Short Story
- Easy Innocence – Winner, Best PI/Police Procedural, Readers Choice Award (Love is Murder conference)
- Set the Night on Fire – Finalist in Foreword Magazine’s Best Suspense Novel of the Year, 2010
- Toxicity – Winner, Best Suspense Novel (Love is Murder conference)
- A Bitter Veil – Finalist, 2012 Book of the Year, Chicago Writers Association; Winner, Best Suspense Novel (Love is Murder conference)
- Havana Lost – Foreword Magazine Finalist for Best Thriller of the Year, 2013; Notable Page-Turner, Shelf Unbound Magazine Fiction Competition; Honorable Mention, 2014 Book of the Year, Chicago Writers Association
- Nobody’s Child – Finalist, 2015 Daphne du Maurier Award for Excellence in Mystery and Suspense; Finalist, Shamus Award, Best Indie PI NovelFinalist in the Fiction: Mystery/Suspense category; Finalist in the Fiction: Mystery/Suspense category of the 2015 USA Best Book Awards; Finalist in Chicago Writers Association Awards – Fiction Category
- The Incidental Spy – Finalist, Foreword Magazine 2015 Book of the Year, Military-War

== Bibliography ==
=== The Ellie Foreman Mysteries ===
- An Eye for Murder (2002)
- A Picture of Guilt (2003)
- An Image of Death (2004)
- A Shot to Die For (2005)
- Jump Cut (2016)

=== The Georgia Davis Mysteries ===
- Easy Innocence (2008)
- Doubleback (2009)
- ToxiCity: A Georgia Davis Prequel (2011)
- Nobody's Child (2014)

=== Stand-alone thrillers ===
- Set the Night on Fire (2010)
- A Bitter Veil (2012)
- Havana Lost (2013)

=== Anthologies/Collections ===
- Chicago Blues (editor, 2007)
- Nice Girl Does Noir, Pt. 1 (2010)
- Nice Girl Does Noir, Pt. 2 (2010)

=== Short stories ===
- "The Day Miriam Hirsch Disappeared" (Amazon.com)
- "Dumber Than Dirt" (Once Upon A Crime anthology)
- "The Rainforest Messiah" (Mysterical-E)
- "The Last Radical" (Futures Magazine)
- "Common Scents" (Blondes in Trouble anthology)
- "A Berlin Story" (Show Business is Murder anthology)
- "House Rules" (Murder in Vegas anthology)
- "A Winters' Tale" (Techno-Noir anthology)
- "Josef's Angel" (Amazon.com)
- "Detour" (These Guns for Hire anthology)
- "Your Sweet Man" (Chicago Blues anthology)
- "The Whole World is Watching" (Sisters on the Case anthology)
- "High Yellow" (A Hell of A Woman anthology)
- "The Murder of Katie Boyle" (Sniplits)
- "Capital Partners" (Write of Spring Anthology)
- "War Secrets" (The Mystery Box Anthology, edited by Brad Meltzer)
- "No Good Deed" (Fiction River Special: Crime anthology, edited by Kristine Kathryn Rusch; reprinted in 25 Best Short Stories of 2014 anthology, edited by Ed Gorman)
- "Letters From Havana" (Saturday Evening Post 2015 Fiction Anthology)
