= Islam vs. Islamists film controversy =

In 2007, PBS declined to air the documentary film Islam vs. Islamists: Voices from the Muslim Center, which was produced for the PBS series America at a Crossroads. Film producers and conservative commentators largely characterized the PBS decision not to air the film as politically motivated, while PBS representatives maintained that the decline had been due to production and editorial choices.

The film was aired by the Fox News Channel in July 2007, advertised as Banned by PBS: Muslims Against Jihad. It was later distributed by multiple local PBS stations.

== Synopsis of film ==
The film is self-described as following "courageous anti-Islamist Muslims in Western Europe, Canada and the United States and the extraordinary challenges they face in taking on adherents to the theo-totalitarian ideology known as Islamism.* What is happening to these moderates — who are being ostracized, intimidated and, in some cases, threatened with death — offers critical insights into the dangers that both they and we are facing."

== Production ==
The film's production was led by Martyn Burke, Alex Alexiev, and Frank Gaffney, the founder of the Center for Security Policy. Due to Gaffney and Alexiev's involvement with the Center for Security Policy, which was closely involved with the issues addressed by the film, PBS expressed some concern with giving the two full editorial control of the film; eventually, they accepted that the two could be executive producers, "but that their role would necessitate careful scrutiny of the film to insure that it was indeed fair and accurate".

It was one of 34 films given competitive grant money by the Corporation for Public Broadcasting "to explore the post-9/11 world", and was one of the 21 films given further production production funding. In total, the film received $675,000 in grant funding.

== PBS decline ==
After receiving the completed film, PBS lead station WETA declined to air the film, saying it did not meet editorial standards. Per policy, PBS and WETA requested certain changes be made to the film, which producers declined to enact. A spokesperson for WETA, Mary Stewart, said of the changes, "We had no problem with the concept or ideology. It was about filmmaking and documentary standards. We had no problem with the argument laid out in the film". Gaffney said the requested changes "would essentially eviscerate the message of the film", and Burke said that, in contrast to public statements, WETA had requested content changes to the film. The film ultimately was not included in America at a Crossroads, which premiered in April 2007 as a 12-hour, 11-part series. The Corporation for Public Broadcasting noted that the 'film simply needs work but stands a chance to be aired eventually as a "stand-alone" program in the future', in the same manner as other commissioned films which were not included in the America at a Crossroads series.

Film producers and conservative commentators largely characterized the PBS decision not to air the film as politically motivated, while PBS and WETA representatives maintained that the decline had been due to production and editorial choices.

Eight Congressional representatives (Trent Franks, Todd Akin, Barbara Cubin, Pete Hoekstra, Ed Royce, Peter King, James T. Walsh and Brad Sherman) wrote to the Corporation for Public Broadcasting, requesting that the film either air on PBS or be released for distribution elsewhere. The CPB did find a new distributor for the film, but stated the decision was not made due to Congressional pressure. WETA noted that the CPB's actions were appropriate, but they thought the "shopping around" of the documentary was unprecedented.

== Subsequent broadcasts and screenings ==
In April 2007, after the PBS decline, producers began offering private screenings of the film.

In May 2007, an agreement was made with Oregon Public Broadcasting to distribute the film in its original form. Network CEO Steve Bass noted, "When something like this becomes an object of controversy, and is a program that people haven't seen, you are generally better off putting it out there. And I think it plays to public broadcasting's strength, which is that we are a collection of local institutions that make our own editorial decisions". Producer Frank Gaffney criticized the agreement, noting it was unclear how extensively the film would be distributed.

The episode was picked up by Fox News Channel, who promoted it as Banned by PBS: Muslims Against Jihad. The unedited documentary, along with interviews with the producers, was aired on July 7, 2007.

Later, it was distributed by the Portland PBS member station KOPB-TV (channel 10, the flagship station of Oregon Public Broadcasting), and subsequently aired on most PBS stations across the country.

== See also ==
- America at a Crossroads, the series for which it was originally produced, which included several other segments about Islam
- Political cinema
