= Paul Duke =

American journalist

- Born: October 16, 1926; Pennsylvania, U.S.
- Died: July 18, 2005 (aged 78); Washington, D.C., U.S.
- Occupations: Newspaper, radio, and television journalist
- Known for: 20-year stint as moderator of Washington Week in Review on PBS

Paul Welden Duke (October 16, 1926 — July 18, 2005) was an American newspaper, radio and television journalist, best known for his 20-year stint as moderator of Washington Week in Review on PBS.

== Early life and education ==
Duke was born in Pennsylvania to Frank W. Duke (1888–1945) and Flossie C. Duke (1889–1952; née Mills). Both his parents hailed from Hanover County, Virginia and the family moved back to Virginia soon after Paul was born. He grew up in Richmond, Virginia, where he worked at radio station WMBG during high school. After graduating high school, Duke attended the University of Richmond where he majored in English.

== Career ==
After he graduated in 1947, he became a sportswriter for Associated Press (AP) in Richmond. Within a few years, he was reporting on major national stories, particularly the struggle for civil rights. His byline became known nationally and, after ten years with the organization, AP rewarded him with a permanent assignment to its Washington bureau.

He covered the 1960 Presidential campaign for The Wall Street Journal (which he had joined the previous year) and in 1963 joined NBC News as a Capitol Hill reporter. After 11 years with the network, he moved to PBS to become their esteemed low-key moderator of Washington Week In Review. He was at first overall anchor of National Public Affairs Center for Television, and co-anchored with Jim Lehrer, their coverage of the impeachment hearings of Richard Nixon. The previous host, Duke's former NBC colleague, Robert MacNeil, had given up his post to start PBS' nightly news and analysis program The Robert MacNeil Report. Duke continued his hosting duties for a record twenty years, as Washington Week in Review became the longest-running series on PBS, won an Emmy Award and gained an audience of 4.6 million. From 1980 to 1984, Duke also hosted The Lawmakers, a show on PBS about Congress.

Duke retired as a full-time journalist in 1994, but continued to contribute reports to his old program from his new base in London, where he lived in 1995–1996. He also served as a news analyst for the BBC and provided an Alistair Cooke-like weekly radio "Letter from London" to National Public Radio (NPR)'s Washington station WETA. In 1999, upon the dismissal of his successor, Ken Bode, he briefly returned as moderator of Washington Week in Review until the eventual permanent host, Gwen Ifill, was able to assume her new duties. In 2003, Paul Duke was elected to the Common Cause National Governing Board.

He was elected to the Common Cause National Governing Board in 1998.

== Death ==
Paul Duke was 78 when he died of acute leukemia at his home in Washington, D.C. He had a son, Paul Jr. from his first marriage to Janet Johnston. Since 1985 he had been married to Janet Wachter.
