= Indira Lakshmanan =

Indian-American journalist

Indira A.R. Lakshmanan
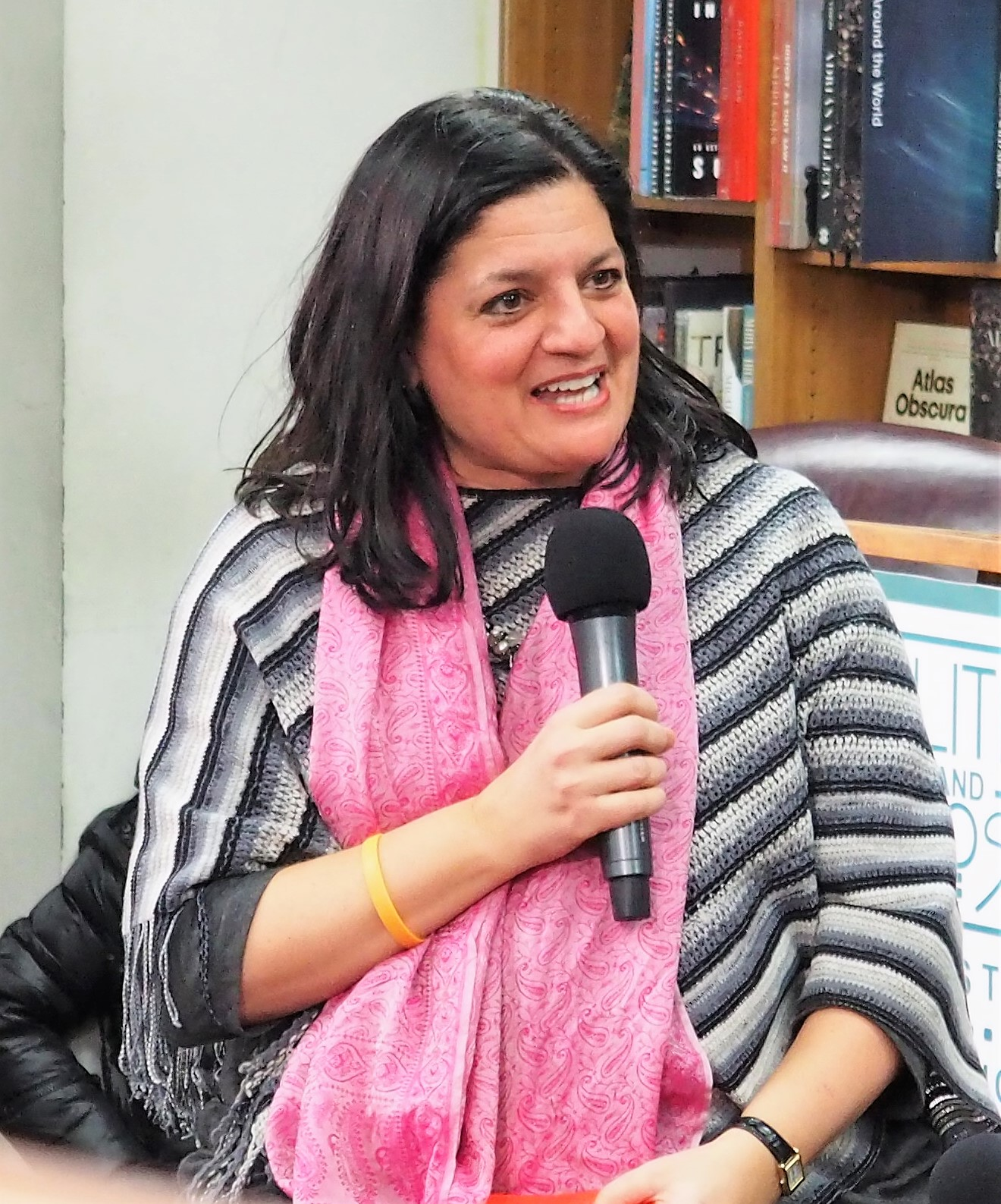
- Born: Indira A.R. Lakshmanan; Pittsburgh, Pennsylvania, U.S.
- Occupation: Journalist
- Known for: Ideas & Opinions editor for U.S. News; Senior executive editor for National Geographic; former columnist and correspondent for The Boston Globe and Bloomberg News; panelist and guest-host on NPR

Indira A.R. Lakshmanan is a journalist based in Washington, D.C. who has been a national and foreign correspondent, columnist and news executive for newspapers, magazines, wire services, radio and TV.

She launched and oversees the Ideas and Opinions section at U.S. News & World Report. Previously, she was the global enterprise editor at the Associated Press, leading a multiplatform special projects team, and the Senior Executive Editor and Vice President for News & Features at National Geographic for nearly three years.

Before National Geographic, she was the executive editor at the nonprofit Pulitzer Center on Crisis Reporting, and the Newmark Chair for Journalism Ethics at the nonprofit Poynter Institute for Media Studies.

She has been a frequent panelist for NPR and PBS news programs, and a guest-host for NPR shows, including 1A.

== Life ==
Indira Lakshmanan was a National Merit Scholar and Radcliffe National Scholar at Harvard University, where she was a magna cum laude graduate in the History of Art and Architecture. She attended University of Oxford as a Rotary Scholar, and did graduate studies there in Latin American studies. In 2003, she was awarded a Nieman journalism fellowship at Harvard University.

== Career ==
She started her career in public media at NPR on the foreign desk in Washington, D.C., and was a stringer for NPR and other radio networks from Santiago, Chile.

She covered local, national and international news for The Boston Globe, spending more than 10 years as a foreign correspondent in Asia, Latin America and Bosnia. Later, for three years, she wrote a column for the Globe from Washington on politics and foreign policy.

She spent eight years at Bloomberg News as a correspondent based in Washington, D.C., reporting news and enterprise on presidential campaigns and foreign policy, traveling with two secretaries of state and appearing regularly on Bloomberg TV. She also has hosted podcasts and written longform magazine stories for National Geographic and POLITICO Magazine and has contributed to PBS Newshour and Washington Week from the U.S. and overseas.

Her Washington Week profile notes that "she has covered presidential campaigns and interviewed leaders in the U.S. and around the world, reporting from 80 countries on six continents. She has traveled with the campaigns of Barack Obama, Hillary Clinton, John McCain, and Mitt Romney and traveled regularly with Secretaries of State Hillary Clinton and John Kerry for Bloomberg News, and interviewed Clinton more than a dozen times for Bloomberg TV, Radio and Businessweek."
