= Yamiche Alcindor =

American journalist (born 1986)

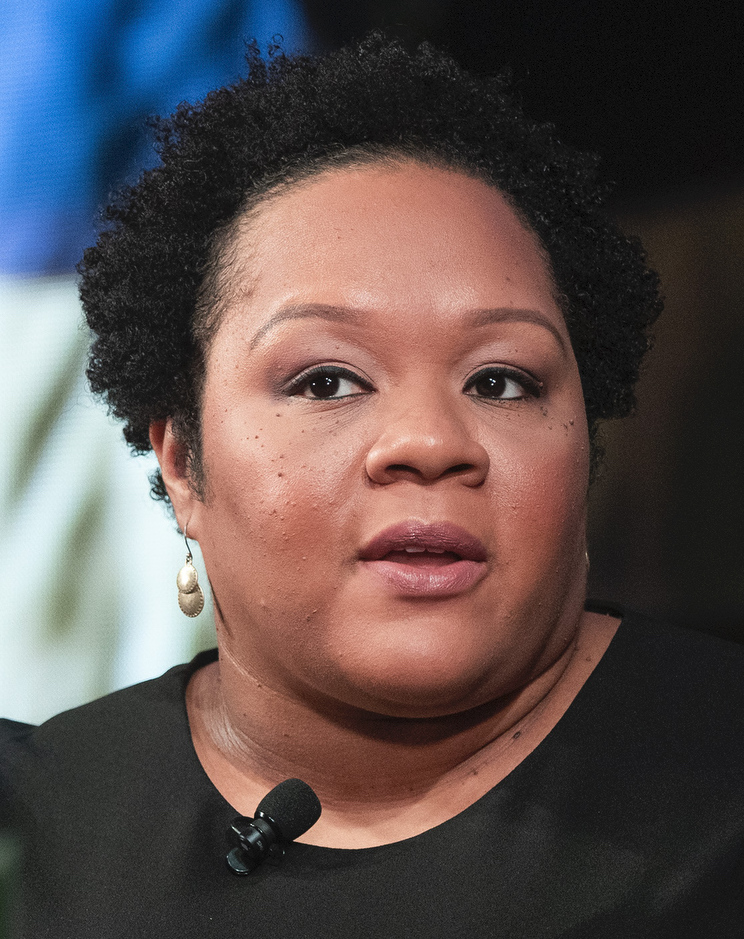
- Alcindor in 2019
- Born: Yamiche Léone Alcindor; November 1, 1986 (age 40); Miami, Florida, U.S.
- Education: Georgetown University (BA); New York University (MA)
- Occupation: Journalist
- Years active: 2010–present
- Employers: NBC News; MS NOW; Washington Week (PBS)
- Spouse: Nathaniel Cline (m. 2018)
- Children: 1

Yamiche Léone Alcindor (/jæˈmiːʃ ælˈsɪndər/ yam-EESH al-SIN-dər; born November 1, 1986) is an American journalist who is a Washington correspondent for NBC News and MS NOW (formerly MSNBC). In the past, she has worked as the host of Washington Week on PBS and as a reporter for PBS NewsHour, USA Today, and The New York Times. Alcindor writes mainly about politics and social issues.

== Early life and education ==
Alcindor was born in Miami, Florida, to Haitian-born parents. When she was in high school, she was an intern at the Westside Gazette, a local African-American newspaper, and the Miami Herald (2005). She earned a bachelor's degree in English and government with a minor in African-American studies at Georgetown University in 2009. While studying, she became a member of the predominantly African-American sorority Alpha Kappa Alpha, and she interned at The Seattle Times (2006), the Miami Herald again (2007), the Botswanan newspaper Mmegi (2008), and The Washington Post (2009). She aspired to become a civil rights journalist, and was inspired by African-American journalist Gwen Ifill and contemporary newspaper reporting surrounding Emmett Till. In 2015, Alcindor received a master's degree in broadcast news and documentary filmmaking at New York University.

== Career ==
Alcindor's first full-time job was as a reporter at Newsday, a newspaper based in Melville, New York. She was employed there for two years covering, among other things, the 2010 Haiti earthquake.

Alcindor became a multimedia reporter for USA Today in December 2011 to cover national breaking news. For the newspaper, Alcindor reported on, among other things, the Sandy Hook Elementary School shooting, the killing of Trayvon Martin, the Ferguson unrest, and the Baltimore protests. In 2013, Alcindor began to contribute to NBC News and MSNBC as a guest. Programs she appeared on include Morning Joe, The Rachel Maddow Show, PoliticsNation with Al Sharpton, Hardball with Chris Matthews, and Meet the Press.

She left USA Today to work for The New York Times as a national political reporter in November 2015. At The New York Times, Alcindor covered the presidential campaigns of Donald Trump and Bernie Sanders. She also produced a documentary called The Trouble with Innocence (2015) about a man who was wrongly convicted of murder. Alcindor also appeared in the 2018 television series The Fourth Estate about Times staff covering the first 100 days of the Trump presidency.

In January 2018, Alcindor was named White House correspondent of the PBS NewsHour, replacing John Yang, who was named the NewsHour's national correspondent. In this position, Alcindor first covered the Trump presidency. During the 2020 presidential election season, she was one of the moderators of the sixth Democratic debate. Erik Wemple of The Washington Post reported President Donald Trump has repeatedly insulted Alcindor at White House press conferences. Alcindor received the 2020 Aldo Beckman Award for Overall Excellence in White House Coverage from the White House Correspondents' Association.

In May 2021, Alcindor became the new moderator of Washington Week.

In January 2022, Alcindor left PBS NewsHour and, in March 2022, began work as a Washington correspondent for NBC News.

On February 24, 2023, Alcindor made her last appearance moderating Washington Week, announcing that she intends to spend more time fulfilling her duties at NBC and writing her memoir.

== Awards and honors ==
Alcindor was named "Emerging Journalist of the Year" by the National Association of Black Journalists in 2013.

In 2016, she was nominated for a Shorty Award in the Journalist category. The next year, Alcindor won an award in a tribute to journalist Gwen Ifill, who had died in November 2016, at the Syracuse University's Toner Prize ceremony.

Alcindor was number 13 on the 2017 edition of "The Root 100", an annual list by the magazine The Root of the most influential African Americans between the ages of 25 and 45. She was number 5 on the 2020 edition of "The Root 100".

== Personal life ==
Alcindor is Haitian-American and is fluent in Haitian Creole. She is a member of the National Association of Black Journalists. In 2018, she married Loudoun Times-Mirror reporter Nathaniel Cline. She is Catholic. On April 24, 2023, she revealed that after years of IVF treatment, she was expecting a baby boy in June.
