= Michael Scherer =

Michael Scherer may refer to:

- Michael Scherer (journalist)
- Michael Scherer (American football)
