= CapAccess =

Internet service provider

CapAccess was an early Internet service provider based in Washington, DC. It was founded in 1992 with funding from the Corporation for Public Broadcasting and George Washington University. The service charged a one-time fee of $25 and provided users with access to internet e-mail, Gopher, and text-based access to the World Wide Web. In 1995, management of the system was taken over by WETA, the PBS station based in Washington.

Initially, access to the network was available via dial-up over telephone lines. In 1998, users could access the system via telnet. In 2001, the system was given an overhaul and was converted from text-based to graphical, with the usage of the FirstClass platform.

CapAccess played a large part in connecting governmental and educational organizations to the internet in its infancy. As time went on, Internet access became accessible from a number of commercial Internet service providers. The service was sunset in 2009 with broadband access in the region becoming standard.
