= America at a Crossroads =

Documentary miniseries

America at a Crossroads is a documentary miniseries concerning the issues facing the United States as related to the war on terrorism. It originally aired on PBS.

The miniseries initially consisted of 11 independently produced aired episodes, and premiered from April 15–20, 2007 on PBS. Its executive producers were Jeff Bieber and Dalton Delan; the series producer was Leo Eaton and it was presented by Robert MacNeil. Its music score was composed by Canadian musician Mark Korven.

== Subject matter ==
America at a Crossroads explores the challenges confronting the post-9/11 world — including the war on terrorism; the conflicts in Iraq and Afghanistan; the experience of American troops serving abroad; the struggle for balance within the Muslim world; and global perspectives on America's role overseas.

Aimed at creating a national dialogue surrounding the crucial issues explored in the series, an extensive media and outreach campaign in more than 25 communities accompanies the series. The campaign features screening events with the filmmakers and their subjects in discussions with United States military personnel, leading policy experts, leaders of the Islamic community, scholars from across the country as well as members of the public.

== Episode list ==
- Spring 2007 (Premier Series):
  - Jihad: The Men and Ideas Behind Al-Qaeda
  - Warriors
  - Operation Homecoming: Writing the Wartime Experience
  - Gangs of Iraq
  - The Case for War: In Defense of Freedom
  - Europe's 9/11
  - The Muslim Americans
  - Faith Without Fear
  - Struggle for the Soul of Islam: Inside Indonesia
  - Security Versus Liberty: The Other War
  - The Brotherhood

=== Removed from Premier Series ===
- Islam vs. Islamists: Voices from the Muslim Center
  - Was aired on the Fox News Channel as Banned by PBS: Muslims Against Jihad

=== List of Additional Episodes ===
- Summer 2007:
  - Kansas to Kandahar: Citizen Soldiers at War
  - The Anti-Americans (a hate/love relationship)
  - Inside America's Empire
- Fall 2007:
  - Homegrown: Islam in Prison
  - Campus Battleground

== Criticism ==
One film, The Case for War: In Defense of Freedom, in which Richard Perle presented his view of the challenges facing the U.S. generated considerable controversy. Some critics complained that the film failed to adequately challenge Perle's views. The New York Times called the film "a fascinating study in rationalization, a lighter, less repentant version of The Fog of War, Errol Morris's documentary about Robert S. McNamara". One critic complained that PBS's endorsement of the neoconservative viewpoint in this film was so misguided, that PBS viewers should express their disgust by "either cutting off donations or at least demanding back a percentage of what they've already given". Conversely, the producers of an unaired segment, Islam vs. Islamists, claimed they had been victims of liberal bias and subsequently aired their documentary on the Fox News Channel under the provocative title Banned by PBS: Muslims Against Jihad.
