= Hans Nichols =

American journalist

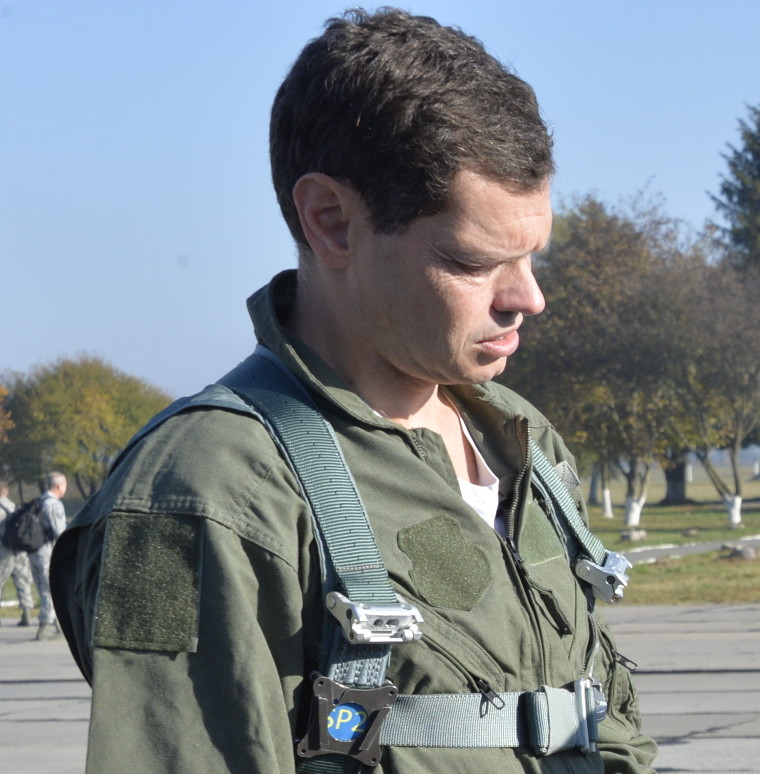
- Nichols in 2018 at Starokostiantyniv Air Base as NBC Pentagon correspondent
- Born: 1977 or 1978 (age 48–49)
- Education: Cornell University; London School of Economics; George Washington University
- Occupation: Journalist
- Spouse: Jessica Holzer

Hans Nichols (born 1977/1978) is an American journalist. Nichols is a political reporter for Axios. He is a former correspondent for NBC News and appears regularly live from the White House on MSNBC. Nichols has served as a subject matter expert about American politics on Washington Week, the Golf Channel, and KCRW, and Sierra Leone on National Public Radio.

On May 27, 2020, it was announced that Nichols would be leaving NBC and MSNBC to become a political reporter at Axios.

== Early life and education ==
Nichols is the son of Carola and Dr. Sam J. Nichols. His father was a radiologist. He earned a bachelor's degree magna cum laude from Cornell University, followed by his master's degree in political theory from the London School of Economics and degree in law from George Washington University. Nichols was named a Fulbright Scholar in 2005.

== Career ==
Nichols was a writer for the Los Angeles Times in 2006. As of 2009, Nichols served as White House correspondent for Bloomberg News. By 2016, he was serving as an international correspondent for Bloomberg News. In June 2016, Nichols became Pentagon correspondent for NBC News, replacing Jim Miklaszewski.

== Personal life ==
Nichols married reporter Jessica Holzer in Bend, Oregon in 2009. The couple lives in the Washington, D.C. area and have three children.
