= Carl Hulse =

American journalist

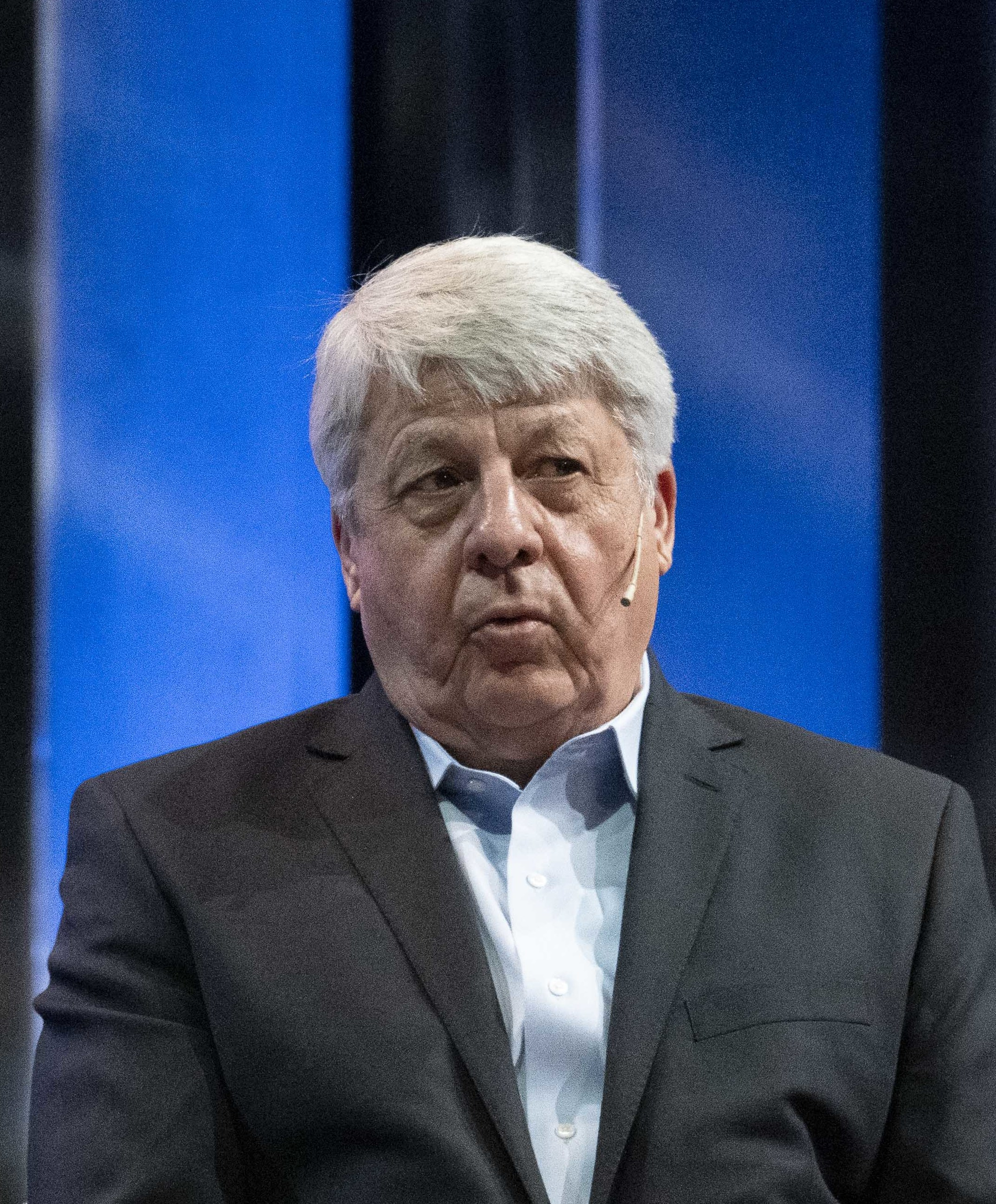
- Carl Hulse in Bergen, Norway, 2022
- Born: Carl E. Hulse; October 19, 1954 (age 71); Ottawa, Illinois, U.S.
- Education: Illinois State University
- Occupation: Journalist
- Spouse: Kimberly A. Hamer Hulse
- Children: 2
- Writing career
- Language: English
- Years active: 1976–present
- Website: www.nytimes.com/by/carl-hulse

Carl E. Hulse (born October 19, 1954) is the chief Washington correspondent for The New York Times and managing editor of First Draft, a political news stream and morning email newsletter. His regular New York Times column "On Washington", described developments in Washington DC. His writing has also appeared online with MSN, MSN UK, MSN Canada, and CNBC, and in the Sydney Morning Herald, Albany Business Review, Boston.com, The Economic Times, American City Business Journals, and Miami Herald.

== Early life and education ==
Hulse was born in Illinois on October 19, 1954, and raised in Ottawa, Illinois. His father, Carl E. Hulse Sr., was a plumbing contractor after World War II, and his mother worked in their home after trying other work. In 1976, he received an undergraduate degree in Mass Communications from Illinois State University’s School of Communication, where as a student he was a news editor for The Vidette. In 2007, the newspaper admitted him to The Vidette Hall of Fame. Ten years later, in 2017, the school’s College of Arts and Sciences elected him to its Hall of Fame.

== Career ==
Immediately after his college graduation, Hulse worked for the News Tribune in LaSalle, Illinois-Peru, Illinois. Before relocating to Washington, D.C. in 1985, he spent the early years of his career working at newspapers in Illinois and Florida, The Daily Journal in Kankakee, Illinois, and the Sun-Sentinel in Fort Lauderdale, Florida.

In 1985, Hulse began working at the Washington, D.C. bureau of The New York Times, and covered its regional editions, first as night editor working the 3 p.m. to midnight shift. He began covering Capitol Hill in May 2002. From 2011 to 2014, he was the Washington editor for the Times, coordinating its coverage of the White House and executive branch, Congress, the courts, and the Pentagon. For more than a decade he had served as the paper's chief Congressional correspondent.

As a political reporter, Hulse declares no political party. He appears occasionally on PBS's Washington Week program on Friday evenings.

== Personal life ==
Hulse lives in Washington, D.C. with his wife, Kimberly Hamer Hulse, a longtime National Geographic employee. They have two grown sons, Nicolas and Benjamin.

Hulse is in a local band called the Native Makers, where he plays drums, maraca, and other percussion instruments; they have written a song called "This Town" and do musical entertainment on ocean cruises.
