= Washington Week =

American public affairs TV program

- Also known as: Washington Week in Review (1967–2001); Washington Week with the Atlantic (2023–present)
- Presented by: John Davenport (1967–1968); Lincoln Furber (1968–1969, 1971, 1973–1974); Max Kampelman (1969–1971); Robert MacNeil (1971–1973); Paul Duke (1974–1994); Ken Bode (1994–1999); Gwen Ifill (1999–2016); Robert Costa (2017–2021); Yamiche Alcindor (2021–2023); Jeffrey Goldberg (2023–present)
- Narrated by: Paul Anthony
- Country of origin: United States
- Original language: English
- No. of seasons: 58
- No. of episodes: over 2,000

Production
- Production locations: David M. Rubenstein studio at WETA-TV in Washington, D.C., U.S.
- Running time: 30 minutes
- Production companies: WETA Washington, D.C. (1967–1971, 1976–2021); National Public Affairs Center for Television (1971–1976); NewsHour Productions (2021–present)

Original release
- Network: NET
- Release: February 23, 1967 – October 2, 1970
- Network: PBS
- Release: October 8, 1970 – present

Logo used from July 20, 2018 to August 4, 2023

Washington Week, originally titled as Washington Week in Review and billed as Washington Week with the Atlantic since 2023, is an American public affairs television program, which has aired on PBS and its predecessor, National Educational Television, since 1967. The program is produced by WETA-TV in Washington, D.C. Since 2023, the program has been moderated by editor-in-chief of The Atlantic, Jeffrey Goldberg. Unlike other panel discussion shows, which encourage informal (sometimes vociferous) debates as a means of presentation, Washington Week consistently follows a path of civility and moderation. Its format is that of a roundtable featuring the show's moderator and two to four Washington-based journalists.

== History ==
Washington Week premiered as Washington Week in Review on February 23, 1967 on National Educational Television and was picked up by PBS in 1970. Since its first episode in 1967, the program's announcer has been Paul Anthony.

In 1971, Robert MacNeil took on the task of hosting the series after temporarily replacing Furber following the departure of Max Kampelman, and would move on after anchoring PBS's Watergate coverage to found PBS's first weeknight newscast, The Robert McNeil Report, which would eventually become the PBS News Hour; in 1973, Furber temporarily returned as moderator, from 1974, Paul Duke served as host and moderator, until he was succeeded in 1994 by Ken Bode.

From 1971 to 1976, the show was produced under National Public Affairs Center for Television. Therefore during the show's run under NPACT, it spawned two spin-off series, Thirty Minutes With... (later known as Washington Straight Talk from 1973 to 1975 after being nameless in PBS' press release of the fall 1973 schedule), aired from 1971 to 1975, originally hosted by Elizabeth Drew, and later a rotation of guest panelists after Drew left, and Washington Connection in 1974, which was among the programs cancelled by the new programming cooperative.

In 1979, the Ford Motor Company was assigned as its first corporate underwriter, a tradition that had continued for 20 years. In 1999, Dalton Delan fired Bode. On October 1, 1999, Gwen Ifill became the host of the program until her death on November 14, 2016. A successor was not announced immediately. Ifill shortened the program's name as Washington Week on February 9, 2001, two years after she took over, as a sign that "the show would spend more time looking forward." On April 20, 2017, WETA announced that Robert Costa of The Washington Post would become the next moderator of Washington Week.

On January 8, 2010, Washington Week became the second Sunday morning talk show to broadcast in high definition (after ABC's This Week on April 20, 2008), with broadcasts presented in letterboxed and pillarboxed format for viewers with standard-definition television sets watching either through cable or satellite television (announced by Ifill at the end of the January 1, 2010 edition). The program also introduced a new set and upconverted its existing graphics package to HD.

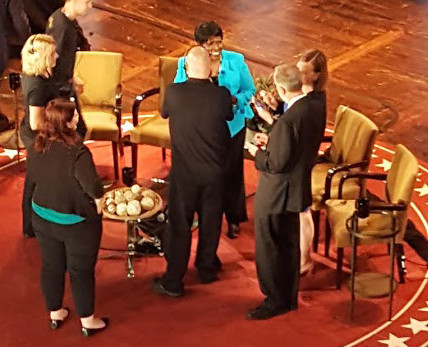
Ifill and other personalities chat after filming a special edition at the Hanna Theatre in Cleveland during the 2016 Republican National Convention

On July 20, 2018, the program underwent its first significant change in presentation in years, adopting a new graphics package and a reorchestrated version of its theme music (with a new set, and music by Stephen Arnold).

In January 2021, Costa left the program to devote his time to co-authoring an upcoming book with veteran journalist Bob Woodward; guest moderators were used in Costa's place.

In May 2021, Yamiche Alcindor, at the time the White House correspondent for PBS News Hour, became the ninth moderator of Washington Week. Alcindor had previously been a regular Washington Week panelist. In December 2021, WETA subsidiary NewsHour Productions began producing Washington Week. In February 2023, Alcindor announced that she would step down to focus full-time on her job at NBC and writing her memoirs, saying that her final date as moderator would be February 24. After Alcindor's departure, various other journalists of PBS News Hour served as guest moderator until August 2023.

On August 2, 2023, it was announced that Jeffrey Goldberg, who has served as editor-in-chief of The Atlantic since 2016, had been named as the program's tenth moderator, and that the politics and culture publication would also enter into an editorial partnership with the television program – which was retitled accordingly as Washington Week with The Atlantic – similar to the earlier collaboration with the National Journal. The first episode under the longer title, and with Goldberg as moderator, was broadcast on August 11, 2023.

On June 21, 2024, Washington Week moved to a new studio, designed by Eric Siegel and George Allison, called the David M. Rubenstein studio at the WETA-TV facility in Washington, D.C. (sharing with programs, PBS NewsHour and PBS News Weekend; name not revealed until September 20, 2024).

== National Journal ==
On February 17, 2006, Washington Week formed an agreement with National Journal, ensuring that at least one National Journal panelist would be on the show. As of January 4, 2013, the agreement is no longer in effect.

== Format ==
Since moving to PBS, Washington Week has used a panel discussion format moderated by a host. Panelists come from various national media organizations.

== Distribution ==
Washington Week is on PBS's national primetime lineup. Because of PBS's subscriber nature, local presentation of Washington Week is scheduled by individual stations, and air times vary by market. The most common airing pattern is the show leading off primetime on Friday evenings with weekend afternoon encores on most PBS member stations and several airings per week on the affiliated network, World Channel.

== Notable personalities ==
=== Moderators ===
- 1967–1968: John Davenport
- 1968–1969: Lincoln Furber
- 1969–1971: Max Kampelman
- 1971: Lincoln Furber (interim moderator)
- 1971–1973: Robert MacNeil
- 1973–1974: Lincoln Furber (interim moderator)
- 1974–1994: Paul Duke
- 1994–1999: Ken Bode
- 1999–2016: Gwen Ifill
- 2016–2017: Amy Walter (main interim moderator)
- 2017–2021: Robert Costa
- 2021–2023: Yamiche Alcindor
- 2023–present: Jeffrey Goldberg

=== Regular panelists ===
- Tim Alberta
- Anne Applebaum
- Peter Baker
- Molly Ball
- Dan Balz
- Paul Beckett
- Leigh Ann Caldwell
- Francesca Chambers
- Kaitlan Collins
- McKay Coppins
- Eugene Daniels
- Andrew Desiderio
- Lisa Desjardins
- Caitlin Dickerson
- John Dickerson
- Franklin Foer
- Susan Glasser
- Errin Haines
- Adam Harris
- Shane Harris
- Stephen Hayes
- Carl Hulse
- David Ignatius
- Weijia Jiang
- Jonathan Karl
- Ed O'Keefe
- Asma Khalid
- Seung Min Kim
- Liz Landers
- Mark Leibovich
- Jonathan Lemire
- Mara Liasson
- Laura Barrón-López
- David Leonhardt
- Scott MacFarlane
- Jonathan Martin
- Jeff Mason
- Jane Mayer
- Andrea Mitchell
- Amna Nawaz
- Hans Nichols
- Tom Nichols
- Toluse Olorunnipa
- Susan Page
- Tyler Pager
- Ashley Parker
- Tarini Parti
- Michelle Price
- Philip Rucker
- Vivian Salama
- David Sanger
- Michael Scherer
- Kayla Tausche
- Karen Tumulty
- Ali Vitali
- Matt Viser
- Amy Walter
- Alexander Ward
- Zolan Kanno-Youngs
- Nancy Youssef
- Jeff Zeleny

== Reception ==
Washington Week has received generally positive reviews from television critics. Barry Garron of Current wrote, "Favor[s] balance over frivolity." Angelina Chapin of The Cut wrote, "[Alcindor's] job requires staying on top of a constantly evolving, 24/7 news cycle and then making those stories digestible for viewers."

== Sponsors ==
Program sponsors include:

=== Corporate sponsors ===
- Consumer Cellular

=== Foundations ===
- The Yuen Foundation
- Sandra and Carl DeLay-Magnuson
- Rose Hirschel and Andy Shreeves
- Robert and Susan Rosenbaum
- Jay and Sharon Rockefeller
- Charles Hamowy through the Charles Hamowy Fund
- Steve and Marilyn Kerman
- Leonard and Norma Klorfine

== See also ==
- Inside Washington
- Agronsky & Co.
- Gordon Peterson
