= Ken Bode =

American TV host (1939–2022)

Kenneth Adlam Bode (March 30, 1939 – June 2, 2022) was an American television host. He was born in Chicago and raised in Hawarden, Iowa. Graduated from Hawarden High School in 1957. Bode was the moderator of Washington Week from 1994 to 1999. He also served as Dean of the Medill School of Journalism at Northwestern University and a professor at DePauw University, Michigan State University, and the State University of New York at Binghamton. He received his undergraduate degree from the University of South Dakota and his Ph.D. in political science from the University of North Carolina.
