= Michael Scherer (journalist) =

American journalist

- Education: University of California, Santa Cruz (BA); Columbia University
- Occupation: Journalist
- Employer: The Atlantic
- Awards: National Press Club Award, New York Press Club Award

Michael Scherer is an American journalist. He is currently a reporter for The Atlantic. He previously wrote for The Washington Post, covering the White House and Congress.

== Education ==
Scherer received a B.A. in literature from the University of California, Santa Cruz in 1998. He later completed a Masters at the Columbia University Graduate School of Journalism.

== Career ==
Scherer started his career as a reporter at Mother Jones before he was made Washington correspondent for Salon. He was recruited to join TIME in 2007 and was the magazine’s White House correspondent until he was promoted to Washington bureau chief in 2009. He moved to The Washington Post in 2017 and to The Atlantic at the very end of 2024.

Scherer regularly appears on PBS's Washington Week and C-SPAN.

=== Awards ===
Scherer won the National Press Club’s Lee Walczak Award for Political Excellence in 2012 for his work covering the Obama re-election campaign. In 2014, Scherer won the New York Press Club Award for Political Coverage for a cover story on the US government shutdown in 2013.
