= Elizabeth Drew =

American political journalist and author

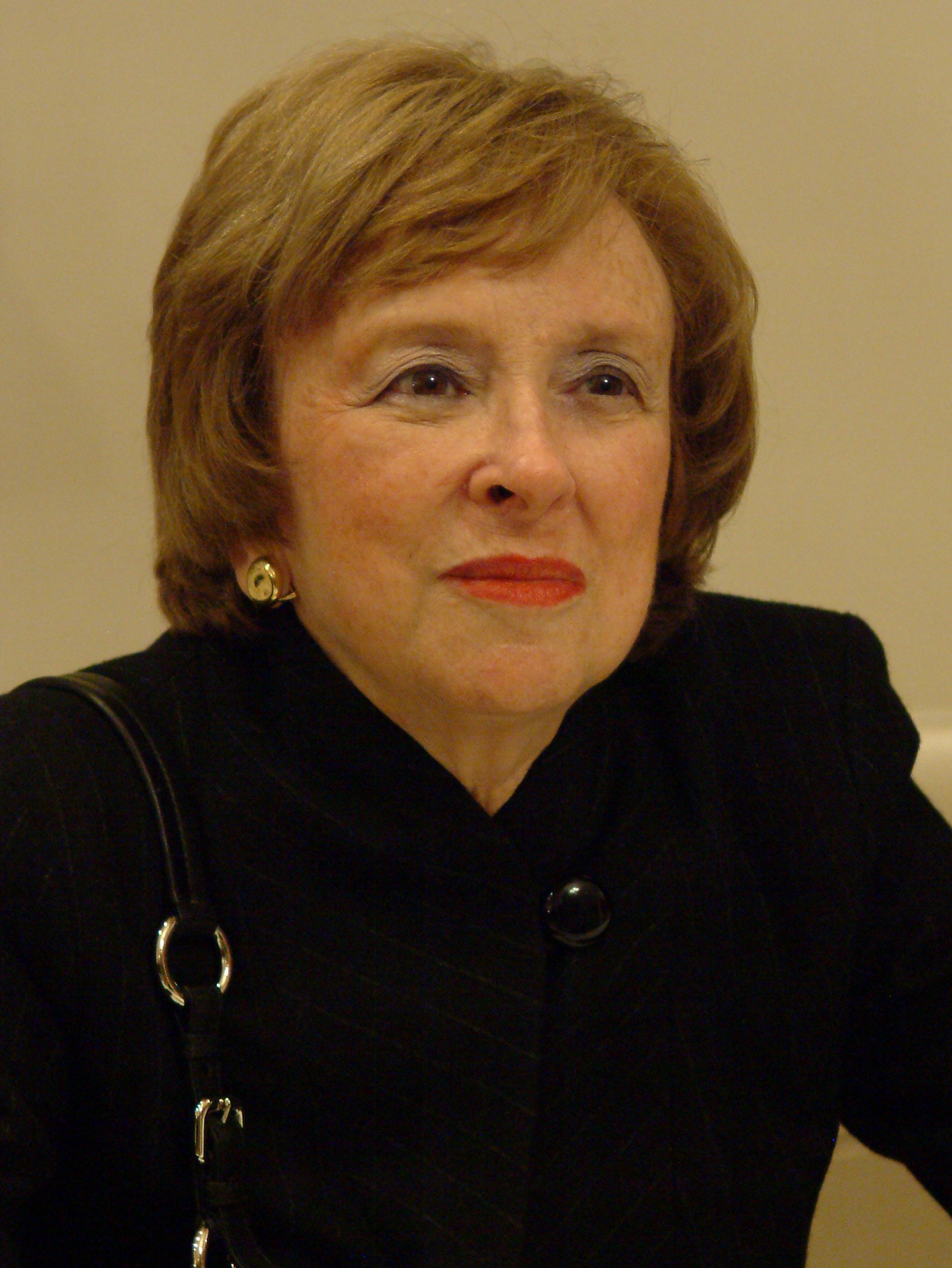
- Drew in 2008
- Born: Elizabeth Brenner; November 16, 1935 (age 90); Cincinnati, Ohio, U.S.
- Education: Wellesley College
- Occupations: Political journalist and author
- Spouses: J. Patterson Drew (m. 1964; died 1970) David Webster (m. 1981; died 2003)

Elizabeth Drew (born November 16, 1935) is an American political journalist and author.

== Early life ==
Elizabeth Jane Brenner was born on November 16, 1935, in Cincinnati, Ohio. She is the daughter of William J. Brenner, a furniture manufacturer, and Estelle Brenner (née Jacobs).

Drew attended Wellesley College, where she was a Phi Beta Kappa and graduated in 1957 with a BA in political science. Her first job in journalism was with Congressional Quarterly from 1959.

== Career ==
External videos
- Interview with Drew on Campaign Journal, March 19, 1985, C-SPAN
- Booknotes interview with Drew on On the Edge, December 11, 1994, C-SPAN
- Presentation by Drew on Showdown, April 18, 1996, C-SPAN
- Presentation by Drew on Whatever It Takes, May 14, 1997, C-SPAN
- Interview with Drew on On the Edge, October 1, 1998, C-SPAN
- Washington Journal interview with Drew on The Corruption of American Politics, July 12, 1999, C-SPAN
- Washington Journal interview with Drew on Citizen McCain, May 7, 2002, C-SPAN
- Interview with Drew on Citizen McCain, November 14, 2002, C-SPAN
- Washington Journal interview with Drew on Richard M. Nixon, May 29, 2007, C-SPAN
- Interview with Drew on Richard M. Nixon, June 21, 2007, C-SPAN
- Presentation by Drew on Washington Journal: Reporting Watergate and Richard Nixon's Downfall, May 17, 2014, C-SPAN

She was Washington correspondent for The Atlantic Monthly (1967–1973) and The New Yorker (1973–1992). She made regular appearances on "Agronsky and Company" and hosted her own interview program, Thirty Minutes With... for PBS between 1971 and 1973, for which she won an Alfred I. duPont–Columbia University Award. Drew was a panelist for Meet the Press for many years and made frequent appearances on the PBSNews Hour when it was presented by Jim Lehrer and still occasionally appears on The NewsHour and other radio and television programs.

Drew was a panelist for the first debate in the 1976 U.S. Presidential election, and moderated the debate between the Democratic candidates for the nomination in the 1984 race.

Drew has published 14 books, including Washington Journal: The Events of 1973-74 (1975), an account of the Watergate scandal; Portrait of an Election: The 1980 Presidential Campaign (1981); On the Edge: The Clinton Presidency (1994); Citizen McCain (2002); and George W. Bush's Washington (2004). Her most recent book is Richard M. Nixon (2007). Washington Journal was re-issued in 2014, with a new afterword.

In Black Hawk Down, Mark Bowden wrote of "Elizabeth Drew's On the Edge, an account of Clinton's first years in the White House. Drew's is the best account I've read of the Somalia episode from the White House's perspective."

She was chosen to give the Knight Lecture at Stanford University in 1997.

She is a regular contributor to The New York Review of Books, as well as to its website. She has also written for Rolling Stone.

Drew is a former director of the Council on Foreign Relations (1972–1977).

== Personal life ==
Drew was married to J. Patterson Drew from 1964 until his death in 1970 and was married to David Webster from 1981 until his death in 2003. She currently resides in Washington D.C.

== Criticism ==
In 1986, the editors of Snooze: The Best of Our Magazine parodied her as "Elizabeth Drone," author of a "Giant Postcard From Washington."

In 1989, Spy labeled her as the "author of too-frequent Washington columns."

In 2014, President Richard Nixon's former aide Frank Gannon disputed Drew’s “blithe assertions that Nixon was a Dilantin-addicted alcoholic,” arguing that they were “as untrue as they are ugly.”

== Books ==
- Washington Journal: The Events of 1973–74 (1975)
  - Reissued as Washington Journal: Reporting Watergate and Richard Nixon's Downfall (2014)
- American Journal: The Events of 1976 (1977)
- Senator (1979)
- Portrait of an Election: The 1980 Presidential Campaign (1981)
- Politics and Money: The New Road to Corruption (1983)
- Campaign Journal: Political Events of 1983–84 (1985)
- Election Journal: Political Events of 1987–88 (1989)
- On the Edge: The Clinton Presidency (1994)
- Showdown: The Struggle Between the Gingrich Congress and the Clinton White House (1996)
- Whatever It Takes: The Real Struggle for Political Power in America (1997)
- The Corruption of American Politics: What Went Wrong and Why (1999)
- Citizen McCain (2002)
- Fear and Loathing in George W. Bush's Washington (2004)
- Richard M. Nixon (The American Presidents series) (2007)
