= Gwen Ifill =

Panamanian-American journalist, television newscaster, and author (1955–2016)

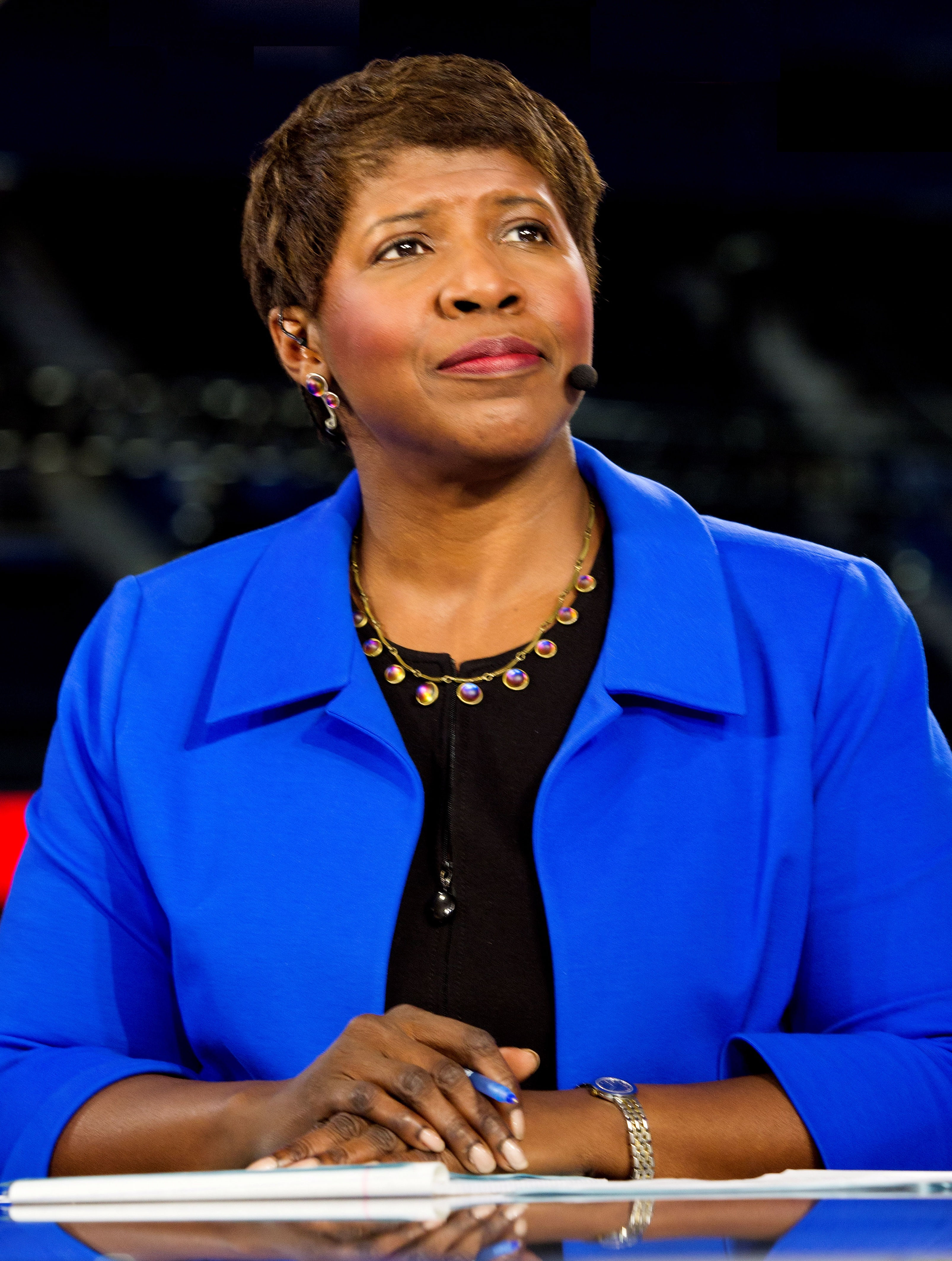
- At the 2012 Republican National Convention for PBS NewsHour
- Born: Gwendolyn L. Ifill; September 29, 1955; New York City, U.S.
- Died: November 14, 2016 (aged 61); Washington, D.C., U.S.
- Education: Simmons College (BA)
- Occupations: Journalist; author
- Years active: 1977–2016
- Notable credit(s): The New York Times; PBS NewsHour; The Washington Post; Washington Week
- Family: Sherrilyn Ifill (cousin)

Gwendolyn L. Ifill (/ˈaɪfəl/ EYE-fəl; September 29, 1955 – November 14, 2016) was an American journalist, television newscaster, and author. In 1999, she became the first African-American woman to host a nationally televised U.S. public affairs program with Washington Week in Review. She was the moderator and managing editor of Washington Week and co-anchor and co-managing editor, with Judy Woodruff, of the PBS NewsHour, both of which air on PBS. Ifill was a political analyst and moderated the 2004 and 2008 vice-presidential debates. She authored the best-selling book The Breakthrough: Politics and Race in the Age of Obama.

== Early life and education ==
Gwendolyn L. Ifill was born on September 29, 1955, in Jamaica, Queens, in New York City. According to The New York Times, she disliked her middle name and never publicly used it beyond the initial. She was the fifth of six children of African Methodist Episcopal (AME) minister (Oliver) Urcille Ifill Sr., a Panamanian of Barbadian descent who emigrated from Panama, and Eleanor Ifill, who was from Barbados. Her father's ministry required the family to live in several cities in New England and on the Eastern Seaboard during her youth, where he pastored AME churches. As a child, she lived in Pennsylvania and Massachusetts church parsonages and in federally subsidized housing in Buffalo and New York City. Ifill graduated from Springfield Central High School (then Classical High School) in Springfield, Massachusetts, in 1973. She graduated in 1977 with a Bachelor of Arts in communications from Simmons College, a women's college in Boston.

== Career ==
While at Simmons College, Ifill interned for the Boston Herald-American. One day at work, she discovered a note on her desk that read, "Nigger go home." After showing the note to editors at the newspaper, who "were horrified," they offered her a job when she graduated from college in 1977. Ifill's close friend Michele Norris stated that Ifill said, "'That was really unfortunate, but I have work to do.' And that's how she got the job. She didn't get the job out of sympathy. She got the job because she didn't let that slow her down."

Ifill went on to work for the Baltimore Evening Sun from 1981 to 1984 and for The Washington Post from 1984 to 1991. She left the Post after being told she was not ready to cover Capitol Hill, but was hired by The New York Times, where she covered the White House from 1991 to 1994. Her first job in television was with NBC, where she was the network's Capitol Hill reporter in 1994.

In October 1999, she became the moderator of the PBS program Washington Week in Review, the first black woman to host a national political talk show on television. She was a senior correspondent for PBS NewsHour. Ifill appeared on various news shows, including Meet the Press, Face the Nation, Charlie Rose, Inside Washington, and The Tavis Smiley Show. In November 2006, she co-hosted Jamestown Live!, an educational webcast commemorating the 400th anniversary of Jamestown, Virginia.

Ifill served on the boards of the Harvard Institute of Politics, the Committee to Protect Journalists, the Museum of Television and Radio, and the University of Maryland's Philip Merrill College of Journalism. In 2017, the Committee to Protect Journalists renamed the Burton Benjamin Memorial Award, which was first presented in 1991, to the Gwen Ifill Press Freedom Award. The award has been given to Judy Woodruff in 2017, Maria Ressa in 2018, Zaffar Abbas in 2019, Amal Clooney in 2020, Jimmy Lai in 2021, Galina Timchenko in 2022, Alberto Ibargüen in 2023, and Christophe Deloire in 2024.

=== 2004 and 2008 vice-presidential debates ===
On October 5, 2004, Ifill moderated the vice-presidential debate between the Republican Vice President Dick Cheney and the Democratic candidate and U.S. Senator from North Carolina, John Edwards. Howard Kurtz described the consensus that Ifill "acquitted herself well" as moderator. She was the first African-American woman to moderate a vice-presidential debate.

Ifill also moderated the vice-presidential debate on October 2, 2008, between the Democratic U.S. Senator from Delaware Joe Biden and the Republican governor of Alaska, Sarah Palin, at Washington University in St. Louis. The debate's format offered Ifill freedom to cover domestic and international issues.

Before the 2008 debate, Ifill's objectivity was questioned by conservative talk radio, blogs, cable news programs and some independent media analysts because of her book The Breakthrough: Politics and Race in the Age of Obama, which was scheduled to be released on Inauguration Day 2009, but whose contents had not been disclosed to the debate commission or the campaigns. The book was mentioned in The Washington Times and appeared in trade catalogues as early as July 2008, well before Ifill was selected by the debate committee. Several analysts viewed Ifill's book as creating a conflict of interest, including Kelly McBride of the Poynter Institute for Media Studies, who said, "Obviously the book will be much more valuable to her if Obama is elected." John McCain, the Republican presidential nominee, said in an interview on Fox News Channel, "I think she will do a totally objective job because she is a highly respected professional." Asked about the forthcoming book, McCain responded, "Does this help...if she has written a book that's favorable to Senator Obama? Probably not. But I have confidence that Gwen Ifill will do a professional job."

"No one's ever assumed a white reporter can't cover a white candidate."

— Gwen Ifill

To critics Ifill responded,

I've got a pretty long track record covering politics and news, so I'm not particularly worried that one-day blog chatter is going to destroy my reputation. The proof is in the pudding. They can watch the debate tomorrow night and make their own decisions about whether or not I've done my job.

After the debate Ifill received praise for her performance. The Boston Globe reported that she received "high marks for equal treatment of the candidates".

Ifill's moderation of the debates won her pop-culture recognition when the debates were parodied on Saturday Night Live, with Queen Latifah portraying Ifill. PBS ombudsman Michael Getler twice wrote about letters he received complaining of bias in Ifill's news coverage. He dismissed complaints that Ifill appeared insufficiently enthusiastic about Sarah Palin's speech at the 2008 Republican National Convention, and concluded that Ifill had played a "solid, in my view, and central role in PBS coverage of both conventions."

=== 2009–2016 ===
On August 18 and 19, 2009, Ifill appeared as the guest expert lifeline on the 10th Anniversary Primetime Celebration of ABC's Who Wants To Be A Millionaire? which was hosted by Regis Philbin. In order of appearance other experts during the run were Sam Donaldson, George Stephanopoulos, Wolf Blitzer, Cokie Roberts, Candy Crowley, Connie Chung, Jodi Picoult, Ken Jennings, Mo Rocca, and Bill Nye. She was used as a lifeline just once, by Nik Bonaddio, who was accurately told by Ifill that the quote "The first thing we do, let's kill all the lawyers" was a line from Shakespeare's "Henry VI, Part II".

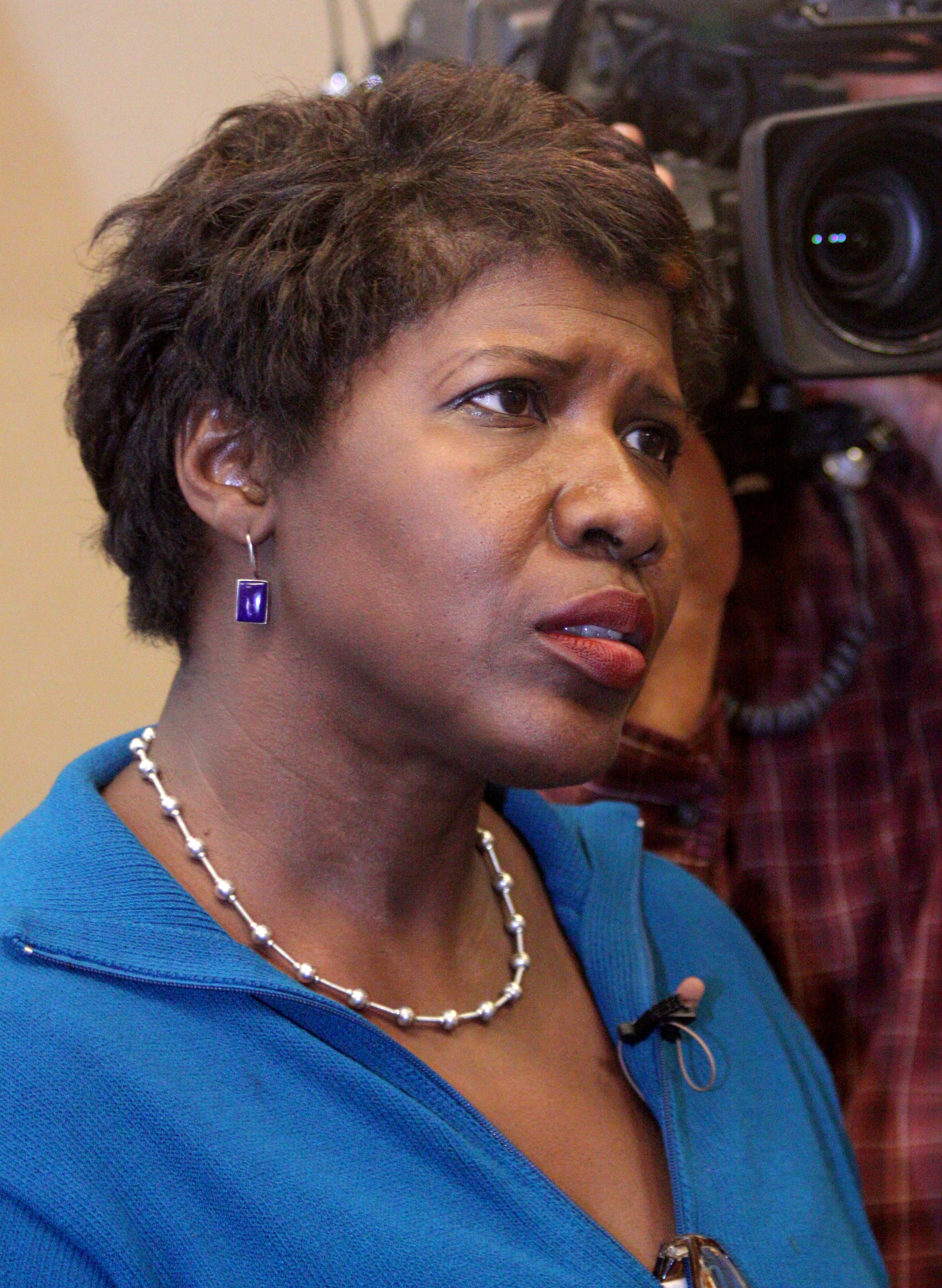
Ifill in 2010

In September 2011, Ifill was a presenter at the 32nd News & Documentary Emmy Awards.

On August 6, 2013, NewsHour named Ifill and Judy Woodruff as co-anchors and co-managing editors. They shared anchor duties Monday through Thursday; Woodruff was the sole anchor on Friday. In November 2015, Ifill was the master of ceremonies at the 2015 LBJ Liberty & Justice For All Award ceremony.

In February 2016, she and Woodruff, moderating the debate between Hillary Clinton and Bernie Sanders, became the first team of women to moderate a Democratic presidential debate.

== Published works ==
Ifill's book The Breakthrough: Politics and Race in the Age of Obama was published on January 20, 2009, the Inauguration Day of President Obama. The book focused on several African-American politicians, including Obama and other up-and-comers such as then-member of Congress Artur Davis, then-Massachusetts governor Deval Patrick, and then mayor of Newark, New Jersey Cory Booker. The publisher, Random House, described the book as showing "why this is a pivotal moment in American history" through interviews with black power brokers and through Ifill's observations and analysis of issues. The book was a New York Times best-seller.

== Honors and awards ==
Ifill was awarded the Women in Film and Video Women of Vision Award in 2000. In 2004, she received the Gracie Allen Tribute Award from the Foundation for American Women in Radio and Television.

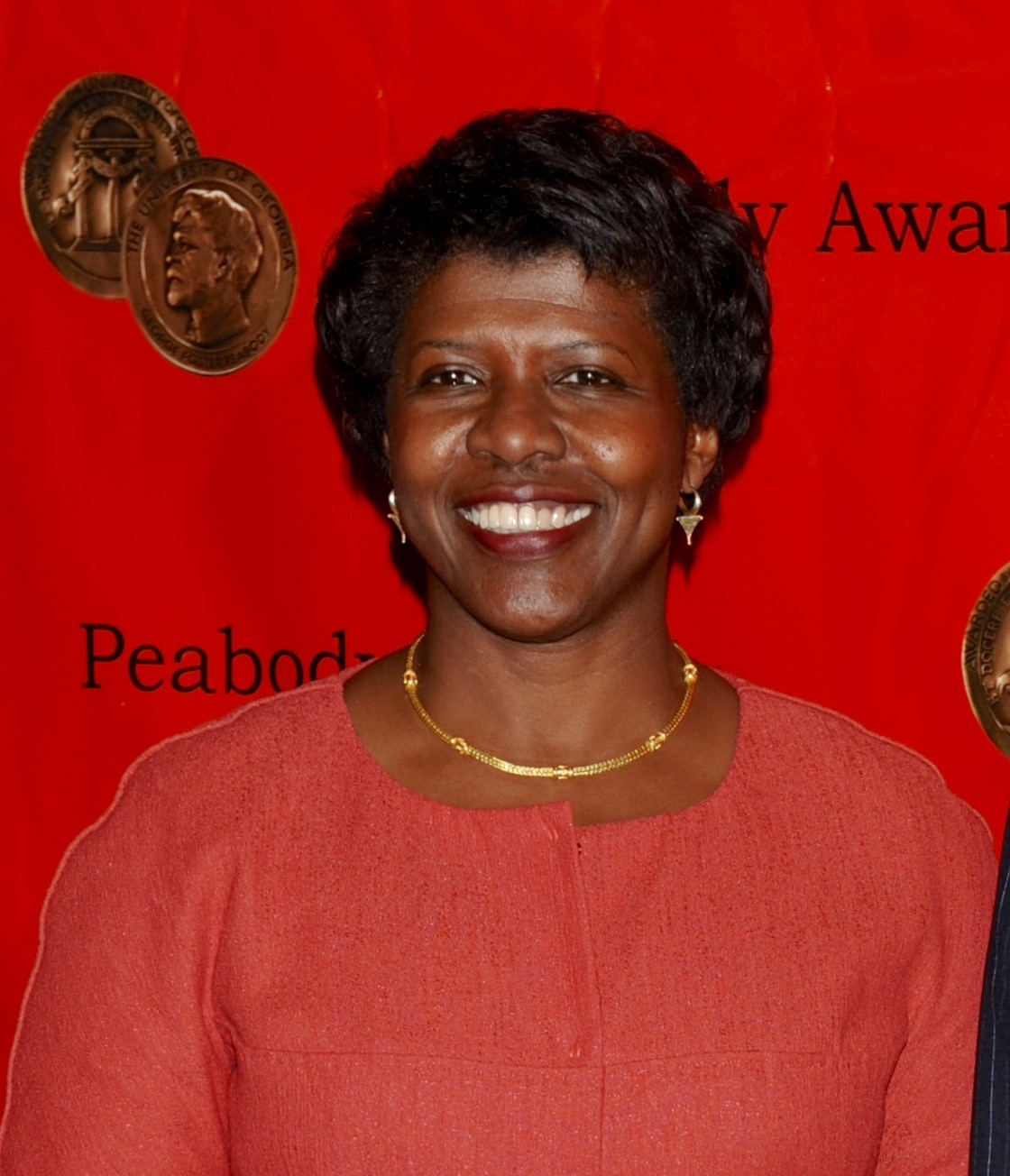
Ifill at the 2009 Peabody Awards ceremony

She was awarded a Peabody Award in 2008 for her work on Washington Week. In 2009, she was honored with the First Amendment Award by Ford Hall Forum, and Harvard University honored her the same year with the Goldsmith Career Award for Excellence in Journalism. The following year, she received the 17th Fred Friendly First Amendment Award from Quinnipiac University. On February 7, 2011, Ifill was named an honorary member of Delta Sigma Theta during the sorority's 22nd Annual Delta Days in Washington, D.C.

In June 2009, Gwen Ifill was inducted into the Washington, DC Journalism Hall of Fame by the Washington DC chapter of the Society of Professional Journalists. In 2012, Ifill was inducted into the National Association of Black Journalists Hall of Fame. In 2014, she was awarded the Al Neuharth Award for Excellence in Journalism. Her work on the PBS town hall special America After Ferguson earned her a nomination for Outstanding Host in a Talk, Reality, News/ Information or Variety (Series or Special) at the 46th NAACP Image Awards. In November 2015, she accepted the Lifetime Achievement award from the Women's Media Center at the annual Women's Media Awards ceremony. She received the Fourth Estate Award from the National Press Club in 2015. Columbia University awarded Ifill the John Chancellor Award for Excellence in Journalism in 2016, but she died two days before the scheduled ceremony.

Ifill received more than 20 honorary doctorates from universities around the world, including Georgetown University, Smith College, Bates College and Skidmore College. In May 2011, she served as a commencement speaker at Morehouse College.

On the first anniversary of her death, November 14, 2017, Ifill's alma mater Simmons College announced that they would be launching a school in 2018, named in her honor as the "Gwen Ifill College of Media, Arts and Humanities".

On January 30, 2020, Ifill was honored on a U.S. postage stamp.

On June 17, 2021, the New York City Department of Parks and Recreation renamed Railroad Park in Queens for her.

Gwen Ifill was posthumously awarded the Dunnigan-Payne Prize for lifetime career achievement on April 29, 2023, at the White House Correspondents' Dinner.

== Personal life ==
Ifill attended Metropolitan African Methodist Episcopal Church from 1989 until her death. She was close to her large extended family, socialized with Washington luminaries as well as colleagues, and supported and mentored young journalists. Sherrilyn Ifill, a cousin and president and director-counsel of the NAACP Legal Defense and Educational Fund, stated at the funeral service that her cousin "represented the most American of success stories."

In her spare time, Ifill was an avid reader. She never married and had no children.

== Death ==
External videos
- Gwen Ifill, 61, PBS journalist who covered history and made history, 9:31, PBS NewsHour, November 14, 2016

Ifill died of breast and endometrial cancer on November 14, 2016, at age 61. According to CNN, she spent her final days at a Washington, D.C. hospice, surrounded by family and friends.

On November 14, PBS NewsHour devoted their full show in tribute to her. Over the course of the following week, this developed into a series of tributes on various NewsHours as "Remembering Gwen." Sara Just of PBS and WETA-TV called Ifill "a journalist's journalist".

President Obama extended his condolences to Ifill's family, saying that he "always appreciated [her] reporting even when [he] was at the receiving end of one of her tough interviews." Speaker of the House Paul Ryan, in expressing his condolences, described Ifill as "an incredibly talented and respected journalist." First Lady Michelle Obama was among the thousands of mourners who attended Ifill's funeral at the Metropolitan African Methodist Episcopal Church in Washington, D.C.

== In popular culture ==
Ifill was featured in a PBS Kids series, Xavier Riddle and the Secret Museum in the episode, "I Am Gwen Ifill".

Ifill was portrayed by Queen Latifah in the cold open of Episode 4 of Season 34 of Saturday Night Live.

Ifill is featured on a United States Postal Service stamp issued in 2019 as part of the postal service’s Black Heritage series.

== See also ==
- List of Afro-Latinos

Media offices
Preceded by Jim Lehrer	PBS NewsHour anchor 2013–2016; With: Judy Woodruff	Succeeded by Judy Woodruff (solo)
