= Robert MacNeil =

Canadian-American journalist (1931–2024)

Robert MacNeil OC
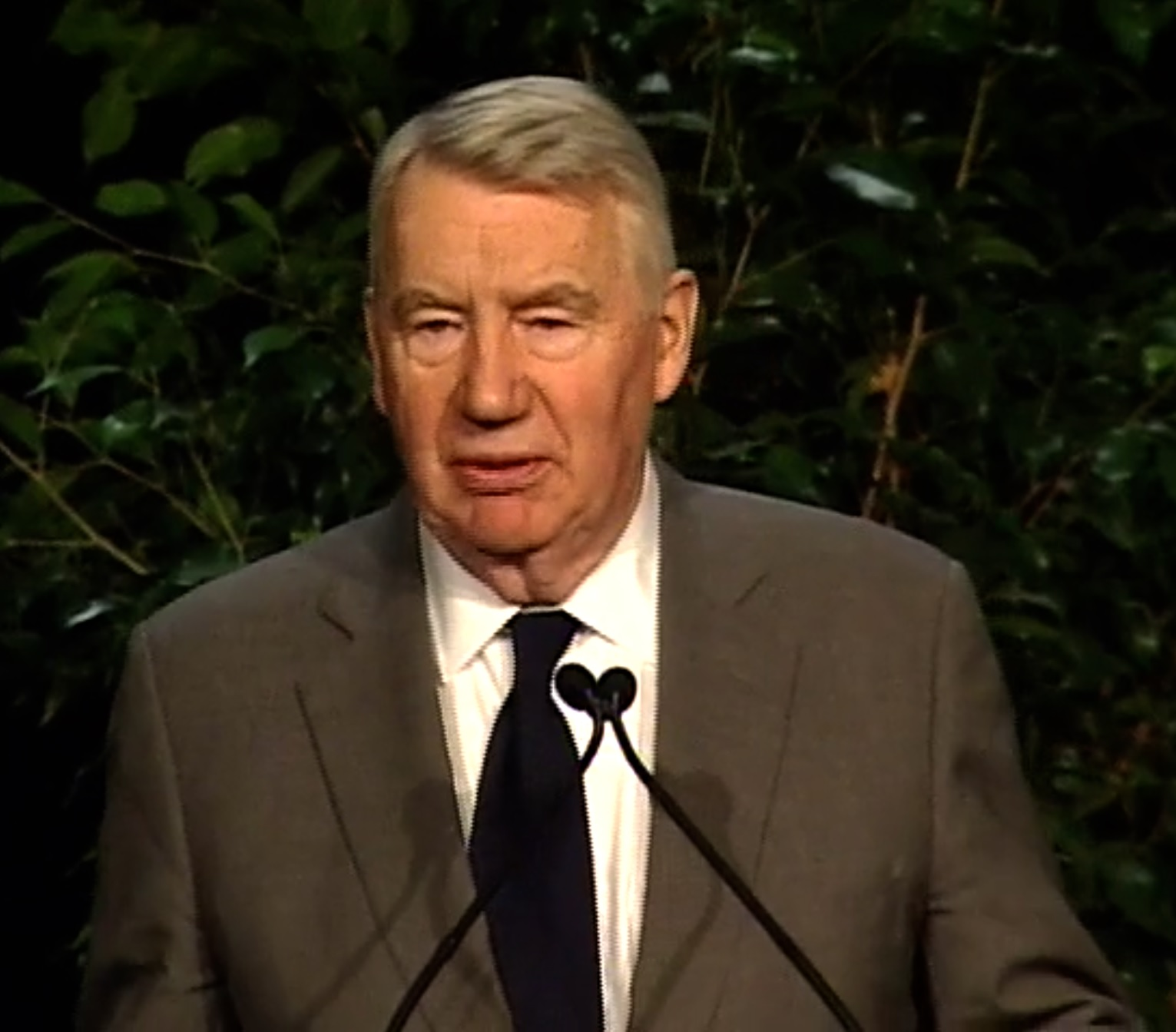
- MacNeil accepting the 2008 Cronkite Award
- Born: Robert Breckenridge Ware MacNeil; January 19, 1931; Montreal, Quebec, Canada
- Died: April 12, 2024 (aged 93); New York City, U.S.
- Citizenship: Canada; United States (from 1997)
- Education: Carleton University
- Occupations: Journalist; novelist
- Years active: 1956–1995
- Notable credit: The MacNeil/Lehrer NewsHour
- Children: 4, including Ian

Robert Breckenridge Ware MacNeil OC (January 19, 1931 – April 12, 2024), often known as Robin MacNeil, was a Canadian-American journalist, writer and television news anchor. He partnered with Jim Lehrer to create the landmark public television news program The Robert MacNeil Report in 1975. MacNeil co-anchored the program until 1995. The show eventually became the MacNeil/Lehrer NewsHour and is today PBS News Hour.

== Early life and education ==
MacNeil was born in Montreal on January 19, 1931, the son of Margaret Virginia (née Oxner) and Robert A. S. MacNeil, a Royal Canadian Navy officer in World War II and later a Canadian foreign service officer. He grew up in Halifax, Nova Scotia, went to boarding school at Rothesay Collegiate School and Upper Canada College, then attended Dalhousie University and later graduated from Carleton University in Ottawa in 1955.

== Career ==
MacNeil began working in the news field at ITV in London, then for Reuters, and then for NBC News as a correspondent in Washington, D.C. He also worked as a news anchor, for WNBC, in New York City.

=== JFK assassination ===
On November 22, 1963, MacNeil was in the press detail that covered President John F. Kennedy's visit to Dallas for NBC News. After shots rang out in Dealey Plaza, MacNeil, who was on the press bus in the presidential motorcade, followed crowds running onto the grassy knoll; he appears in a photo taken just moments after the assassination, but no one was found behind the fence.

Pierce Allman, manager of programming and production at WFAA radio, asked "a young man", who turned out to be Lee Harvey Oswald, for help at the front entrance of the Texas School Book Depository at around 12:33 p.m. He asked Oswald where the telephone was, and Oswald directed Allman to the phone on the first floor, located towards the rear. Recounting his movements to the Dallas Police later, Oswald erroneously referred to Allman as a Secret Service agent because of his suit, blond crew cut, and press badge. Historian William Manchester erroneously suggested MacNeil was the person to whom Oswald spoke in his book The Death of a President (1967). As he was reporting for NBC, MacNeil was at times in relatively close proximity to his future co-anchor and partner Jim Lehrer, also covering the Kennedy visit and assassination for the Dallas Times Herald, but the two did not meet until several years later, covering the Senate Watergate hearings in Washington, D.C. for PBS. He was interviewed for the 1992 documentary Beyond 'JFK': The Question of Conspiracy.

=== News anchor ===
In 1967, MacNeil began covering American and European politics for the BBC. From 1971 to 1974, he hosted Washington Week in Review, a public affairs television program on the Public Broadcasting Service (PBS).

MacNeil rose to fame during his coverage of the 1973 Senate Watergate hearings for PBS, for which he received an Emmy Award. Teamed with Jim Lehrer, the two broadcast and analysed some 250 hours of the hearings in all, sometimes late into the night. This coverage helped lead to and inspire his most famous role, when he joined Lehrer in 1975 to create the PBS daily evening news program The Robert MacNeil Report, later renamed The MacNeil/Lehrer Report and then The MacNeil/Lehrer NewsHour. After serving 20 years on the program, MacNeil retired from his nightly appearances on October 20, 1995. Lehrer continued to anchor the program on a solo basis until his retirement in 2011. The program continues as the PBS NewsHour. He remained involved with the news program until 2013 as one of the heads of MacNeil-Lehrer Productions.

=== Other work ===
In director Michael Almereyda's 2000 modern-day adaptation of Hamlet, MacNeil portrayed the Player King, reimagined as a TV news reporter.

After the September 11 attacks, MacNeil called PBS and offered to help. He joined PBS's coverage of the attacks and their aftermath, interviewing reporters and giving his thoughts on the events.

In 2007, MacNeil hosted the PBS television miniseries America at a Crossroads, which presented independently produced documentaries about the "war on terrorism". The series initially ran from April 15–20, with further episodes later that year.

In a Sesame Street Special Report, muppet parody of the Iran-Contra scandal, MacNeil investigated a "Cookiegate" incident involving the Cookie Monster. In 1998, for Season 29's "Slimey to the Moon" story arc, MacNeil took the role of co-anchor with Kermit the Frog, as Slimey, Oscar the Grouch's pet worm, and four other worms made a landing on the Moon.

MacNeil chaired the MacDowell Colony's board of directors from 1993 to 2010. He was succeeded by Michael Chabon.

Inspired by his passion for language, he made the nine-part television series The Story of English in 1986 for PBS and the BBC, detailing the development of the English language. The Story of English is also a companion book, also produced in 1986. The book and the television series were written by MacNeil, Robert McCrum, and William Cran.

== Personal life ==
MacNeil became a naturalized U.S. citizen in 1997, and became an Order of Canada officer that same year. He was married to Rosemarie Coopland, Jane Doherty, and Donna Nappi Richards MacNeil. With Coopland, he was the father of award-winning theatre scenic designer Ian MacNeil.

MacNeil was known to friends and family as "Robin".

MacNeil died of natural causes at NewYork-Presbyterian Hospital in Manhattan on April 12, 2024, at the age of 93, confirmed by his daughter Alison MacNeil. He had lived at 44 West 77th Street in Manhattan.

== Awards and honors ==
- 1979: LHD honorary degree from Bates College
- 1997: Officer of the Order of Canada, one of Canada's highest civilian honors, for being "one of the most respected journalists of our time"
- 1990: Paul White Award, Radio Television Digital News Association
- 1991: Made a member of the American Academy of Arts and Sciences
- 1999: Television Hall of Fame
- 2008: Walter Cronkite Award for Excellence in Journalism (alongside Jim Lehrer)

== Books ==
MacNeil also wrote books, many of which are about his career as a journalist. After his retirement from NewsHour, he also dabbled in writing novels. His books include:

- The People Machine: The Influence of Television on American Politics (1970). ISBN 978-0413276704.
- Wordstruck: A Memoir (1989) ISBN 978-0670818716.
- Eudora Welty: Seeing Black and White (1990). ISBN 978-0878054718.
- The Way We Were: 1963, the Year Kennedy Was Shot (1991). ISBN 978-0881844337.
- MacNeil, Robert (1992). Burden of Desire. Nan A. Talese/Doubleday. ISBN 9780385420198.
- The Right Place at the Right Time (1990). ISBN 978-0140131208.
- The Voyage (1995). ISBN 978-0385469524.
- Macneil, Robert (1998). Breaking News (A Novel). Nan A. Talese/Doubleday. ISBN 9780385420204.
- The Story of English with Robert McCrum (accompanied by a PBS documentary miniseries in 1986) ISBN 978-0142002315.
- Looking for My Country: Finding Myself in America (2003). ISBN 978-0385507813.
- MacNeil, Robert; Cran, William (December 28, 2004). Do You Speak American?. Nan A. Talese/Doubleday. ISBN 978-0-385-51198-8. (accompanied by a PBS documentary miniseries in 2005)

Preceded by Position created	The Robert MacNeil Report / The MacNeil/Lehrer Report / The MacNeil/Lehrer Newshour anchor 1975–1995; Served alongside: Jim Lehrer	Succeeded by Jim Lehrer
