= WETA-TV =

Television station in Washington, D.C.

- Washington, D.C.; United States
- Channels: Digital: 31 (UHF); Virtual: 26
- Branding: WETA

Programming
- Affiliations: 26.1: PBS; for others, see § Subchannels

Ownership
- Owner: Greater Washington Educational Telecommunications Association
- Sister stations: WETA

History
- First air date: October 2, 1961
- Former channel numbers: Analog: 26 (UHF, 1961–2009); Digital: 27 (UHF, 1998–2019)
- Former affiliations: NET (1961–1970)
- Call sign meaning: Greater Washington Educational Telecommunications Association

Technical information
- Licensing authority: FCC
- Facility ID: 65670
- ERP: 1,000 kW
- HAAT: 257 m (843 ft)
- Transmitter coordinates: 38°57′1″N 77°4′46″W

Links
- Public license information: Public file; LMS
- Website: weta.org/watch

WETA-TV (channel 26) is the primary PBS member television station in Washington, D.C. Owned by the Greater Washington Educational Telecommunications Association, it is a sister station to NPR member WETA (90.9 FM). The two outlets share studios at the Sharon Percy Rockefeller Center for Public Media on Campbell Avenue off Interstate 395 in the Shirlington neighborhood of nearby Arlington, Virginia; WETA-TV's transmitter is located in the Tenleytown neighborhood in Northwest Washington.

Among the programs produced by WETA-TV that are distributed nationally by PBS are the PBS NewsHour, Washington Week, and several cultural and documentary programs, such as the Ken Burns documentaries and A Capitol Fourth.

== History ==
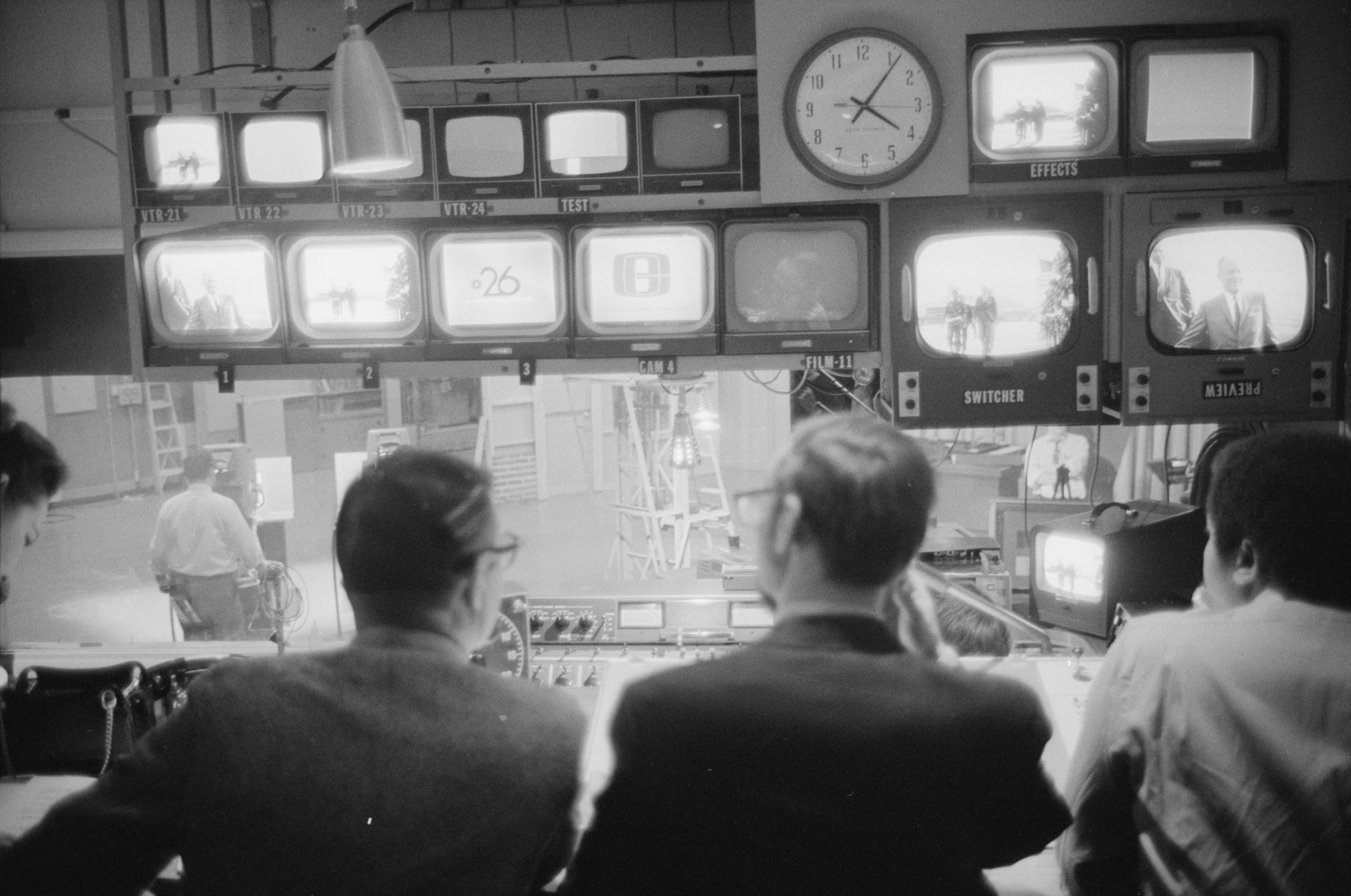
Production control room at WETA, 1969

WETA logo used from 1997 until 2022

In 1952, the Federal Communications Commission (FCC) allocated 242 channels for non-commercial use across the United States; channel 26 was allocated for use in Washington, D.C. In 1953, the Greater Washington Educational Television Association (GWETA) was formed to file for a channel 26 construction permit, joining the D.C. Board of Education. The Board of Education would drop its bid in 1954. GWETA credits Elizabeth Campbell with having founded the organization. In the early days, before it was granted a license for its own channel, GWETA produced educational programming for WMAL-TV and WTTG.

An application was finally filed on May 3, 1961, and approved on June 12, for a construction permit for the channel. GWETA was eventually granted a license by the FCC to activate channel 26; WETA-TV first signed on the air on October 2, 1961, with the first televised class being aired on October 16. WETA originally operated out of Yorktown High School in Arlington; the station later relocated its operations to the campus of Howard University in 1964. Rapid growth led a station that had been described as having "a rough time meeting the monthly bills" in 1963 to even pursue thoughts of a second channel in 1965. In 1967, WETA began producing Washington Week in Review (now simply titled Washington Week), a political discussion program that became the station's first program to be syndicated nationally to other non-commercial educational stations and is now the longest-running public affairs program on PBS.

In February 1971, the Greater Washington Educational Television Association changed its name to the Greater Washington Educational Telecommunications Association to reflect the oversight of the new WETA-FM. Later that year, the station begin producing shows for the newly-formed National Public Affairs Broadcast Center (later National Public Affairs Center for Television), a group led by PBS, the Corporation for Public Broadcasting and the Ford Foundation for its news programming. In 1972, the producing organization National Public Affairs Center for Television merged into WETA. In 1992, WETA broadcast the first publicized over-the-air high-definition television signal in the United States. In 1995, WETA acquired CapAccess, an interactive computer network. From that acquisition, WETA helped connect public schools, public libraries and local government agencies to the Internet.

In 1996, WETA launched its first national educational project, LD Online, a website that seeks to help children and adults reach their full potential by providing accurate and up-to-date information and advice about learning disabilities and ADHD. It was joined in 2001 by Reading Rockets, a multimedia project offering information and resources on how young kids learn to read, why so many struggle, and how caring adults can help. In 2003, Reading Rockets spun off Colorín Colorado, a free web-based service that provides information, activities, and advice for educators, and Spanish-speaking families of English language learners (ELLs). To support the parents and educators of older students who struggle with reading, WETA launched Adlit.org in 2007. AdLit.org is a multimedia educational initiative offering research (articles, instructional strategies, school-based outreach events, professional development webcasts, and book recommendation) to develop teens' literacy skills, prevent school dropouts, and prepare students for the demands of college. Seeing a need to educate the public about brain injuries, in 2008 WETA, in partnership with the Defense and Veterans Brain Injury Center, launched BrainLine.org. The site features videos, webcasts, recent research, personal stories, and articles on preventing, treating, and living with traumatic brain injuries.

In 1997, WETA tested its new full-power digital transmitter by broadcasting the first-ever high definition telecast of a live Major League Baseball game to the National Press Club; the digital facility was activated for full-time broadcasting in November 1998.

With the national closure of the PBS Kids network in 2005, WETA did not become a PBS Kids Sprout partner. By April 2006, the station had added World programming to a subchannel prior to its January 2007 launch as a nationwide network. In 2007, WETA started broadcasting a children's channel branded under the name WETA Kids. By February 2009, WETA only aired a daily three-hour children's morning block on its primary channel, clearing the afternoon for general audience programs like Charlie Rose, travel shows, repeats of the previous night's prime time shows, movies, documentaries, and miniseries.

In January 2012, WETA decided to drop Create due to the network being perceived as lacking programming flexibility as well as a then-recent decision to make the network fee-based. It was replaced by WETA How-To lifestyle programming. How-To was replaced by WETA UK on July 4, 2012, after an analysis of audience and local viewers' demand for British programs.

== Technical information ==
=== Subchannels ===
The station's signal is multiplexed:

Subchannels of WETA-TV
Subchannel	Res.	Short name	Programming
26.1	720p	WETA-HD	PBS
26.2	720p	WETA UK	WETA UK
26.3	480i	KIDS	PBS Kids
26.4	480i	WORLD	World
26.5	720p	METRO	WETA Metro

Channel 26.2, "WETA UK", is a subchannel programmed in-house with a schedule of shows produced in the United Kingdom. Channel 26.5, "WETA Metro", is also produced in-house and focuses on timeshifted rebroadcasts of news programming and reruns that interest a local audience.

=== Analog-to-digital conversion ===
WETA-TV began broadcasting a digital television signal on UHF channel 27 in May 1999, as the first publicly demonstrated digital multicast signal in the Greater Washington area. The station shut down its analog signal, on UHF channel 26, on June 12, 2009, the official date on which full-power television stations in the United States transitioned from analog to digital broadcasts under federal mandate. The digital signal continued to broadcast on its pre-transition UHF channel 27, using virtual channel 26. On July 29, 2019, during the FCC repack, WETA relocated from channel 27 to channel 31.
