= Edward R. Murrow College of Communication =

The Edward R. Murrow College of Communication
- Type: Public
- Established: 2008 (elevated to college status)
- Parent institution: Washington State University
- Dean: Bruce Pinkleton
- Faculty: 35
- Students: 614
- Location: Pullman, Washington, U.S. 46°43′51″N 117°10′01″W
- Website: communication.wsu.edu

The Edward R. Murrow College of Communication is a college of Washington State University (WSU) named in honor of one of WSU's most famous alumni, Edward R. Murrow. The college was launched July 1, 2008. Previously it was the Edward R. Murrow School of Communication housed in the College of Liberal Arts. The Murrow College offers undergraduate sequences in Communication & Society, Journalism & Media Production, and Strategic Communication. The College offers emphases in Communication, Technology, & Social Influence and Media & Health Promotion at the graduate level. The Murrow College currently has 35 faculty, 584 undergraduate students and 30 graduate students.

== History ==
The Department of Communication was formed in 1964 from the merger of the Department of Journalism and the Broadcasting sequence from the Department of Speech. Robert A. Mott was the founding chair. The initial areas of emphasis at the undergraduate level were Newspaper Editorial, Radio & Television, Radio & Television News, and Media Management. In 1973, the Department began an association with WSU alumnus Edward R. Murrow, with the Murrow Communications Center opening as the home of the department and the first annual Edward R. Murrow Symposium being held, bringing Eric Sevareid, Henry Loomis, and Harry S. Ashmore to the WSU campus. This began a tradition of bringing prominent media figures to campus each year, a trend that ultimately became the awarding of the Edward R. Murrow Award.

The Kathi Goertzen Communication Addition opened in 2004.

The 1980s saw a period of rapid growth for the Department. Under the guidance of Professors Glenn Johnson and W. Neal Robison, the Department began a weekly television newscast in 1980. This would be the origins of what was to become Cable 8 Productions, an entirely student-run television channel, launched in 1986. Meanwhile, the Department strengthened its academic offerings by the 1983 merger between the Departments of Communication and Speech Communication, which allowed the Department to begin offering a graduate degree in Communication. The Department granted its first M.A. degree in 1985. In 1986, Dr. Alexis S. Tan joined as chair and led efforts to have the Department designated as the Edward R. Murrow School of Communication, with the new title approved by the WSU Board of Regents in 1990. Into the twenty-first century, the School began offering a Ph.D. in Communication in 2002 and separated from the College of Liberal Arts in 2008, becoming an independent College of Communication. Dr. Lawrence Pintak, a veteran of more than 30 years in journalism and a prominent expert on America's relationship with the Muslim world, was hired as the Founding Dean of the new College.

=== College leaders ===
==== Chairs of the Department of Communication ====
- Robert A. Mott, 1965–1968
- Hugh A. Rundell, 1968–1970
- Donald E. Wells, 1970–1977
- Thomas Heuterman, 1977–1983
- James Van Leuven & Robert Ivie (Interim), 1983
- Thomas Heuterman, 1983–1986
- Alexis S. Tan, 1986–1990

==== Directors of the Edward R. Murrow School of Communication ====
- Alexis S. Tan, 1990–2006
- Erica Weintraub Austin (Interim), 2006–2009

==== Deans of the Edward R. Murrow College of Communication ====
- Erica Weintraub Austin (Interim), 2008–2009
- Lawrence Pintak (Founding Dean), 2009–2015
- Bruce Pinkleton (Acting/Interim, 2016–2018), 2018–present

== Murrow Center for Media and Health Promotion ==
The Murrow Center for Media and Health Promotion is a health communication and media research center housed in the College. It was launched July 1, 2009 by founders Erica Austin, PhD and Bruce Pinkelton, PhD. The center's emphases is research in health communication and health promotion including study of youth and young adults. The Murrow Center for Media and Health Promotion currently has 12 faculty-research members and 8 graduate student-research members.

== Notable alumni ==
- Cindy Brunson (1996, Broadcasting)
- Kathi Goertzen (1980, Broadcasting)
- Keith Jackson (1954, Speech Communication)
- Gary Larson (1972, Communication)
- Edward R. Murrow (1930, Speech Communication)
- Barry Serafin (1964, Humanities)
- Ana Cabrera (2004, Broadcasting)
- Peter Van Sant (1975, Communication)
- John E. Davis (1970, Communication)
- Art Eckman (1964, Communication)

== Student media ==
Cable 8 Productions is a local student-operated cable TV channel serving WSU and the Pullman-Moscow area.

KUGR Cougar College Radio is a student-operated, online radio station.

== The Edward R. Murrow Symposium ==
Virtually every spring since 1973, the College of Communication at Washington State University has hosted the Edward R. Murrow Symposium, an event that brings prominent media figures to the WSU Pullman campus to discuss contemporary issues facing the communication professions and offers current students the opportunity to interact with and seek valuable advice from alumni and communication professionals from across the state of Washington and beyond. Since 1997, the College has presented the Edward R. Murrow Award to members of the communication industry who exemplify a commitment to excellence and integrity emblematic of Murrow's career and legacy.

=== The Edward R. Murrow Award recipients ===
- 1997, Sam Donaldson, for Lifetime Achievement in Broadcasting
- 1998, Frank Blethen, for Lifetime Achievement in Journalism
- 1998, Walter Cronkite, for Lifetime Achievement in Broadcasting
- 1998, Moriyoshi Saito, for International and Intercultural Communication
- 1999, Al Neuharth, for Lifetime Achievement in Journalism
- 1999, Keith Jackson, for Lifetime Achievement in Broadcasting
- 2000, Ted Turner, for Lifetime Achievement in Communications
- 2001, Bernard Shaw, for Lifetime Achievement in Broadcasting
- 2002, Sir Howard Stringer, for International and Intercultural Communication
- 2002, Christiane Amanpour, for Distinguished Achievement in Broadcasting
- 2002, Daniel Schorr, for Lifetime Achievement in Broadcasting
- 2003, Daniel Pearl, for Distinguished Achievement in Journalism
- 2004, Peter Jennings, for Lifetime Achievement in Broadcasting
- 2006, Tom Brokaw, for Lifetime Achievement in Broadcasting
- 2007, David Fanning and FRONTLINE, for Distinguished Achievement in Journalism
- 2008, Don Hewitt, for Lifetime Achievement in Broadcast Journalism
- 2009, Bob Schieffer, for Lifetime Achievement in Broadcast Journalism
- 2009, Helen Thomas, for Lifetime Achievement in Journalism
- 2010, Deborah Amos, for Lifetime Achievement/Radio
- 2010, Judy Woodruff, for Lifetime Achievement/Television
- 2011, Ted Koppel, for Lifetime Achievement in Broadcast Journalism
- 2012, Dan Rather, for Lifetime Achievement in Broadcast Journalism
- 2014, The John S. and James L. Knight Foundation, for Distinguished Achievement
- 2015, Clarissa Ward, for Distinguished Achievement in Journalism
- 2018, Robert Siegel, for Distinguished Achievement in Journalism
- 2019, Melissa Block, for Distinguished Achievement in Journalism
- 2021, Lester Holt, for Distinguished Achievement in Journalism
- 2022, Ann Curry for Distinguished Achievement in Journalism
- 2023, Dean Baquet for Lifetime Achievement
- 2024, Maria Hinojosa, Lifetime Achievement Award for Excellence in Journalism
- 2025, Harry Smith, Lifetime Achievement Award in Journalism
