= Pro-war rhetoric =

Pro-war rhetoric is rhetoric or propaganda designed to convince its audience that war is necessary. The two main analytical approaches to pro-war rhetoric were founded by Arnie Reid, a professor of Communication Studies at the University of Massachusetts Amherst, and Robert Ivie, a professor of Rhetoric and Public Communication and Culture at Indiana University (Bloomington). Reid's framework originated from inductively studying propaganda. Ivie uses a deductive approach based on the work of Kenneth Burke, claiming that "a people strongly committed to the ideal of peace, but simultaneously faced with the reality of war, must believe that the fault for any such disruption of their ideal lies with others" (Ivie 279).

== Rhetorical framework of Ronald Reid ==
Reid's Three Topoi provide a basic framework for understanding pro-war rhetoric and propaganda:

1. Territorial appeals
2. Ethnocentric appeals
3. Appeals to optimism characterize pro-war rhetoric.

Reid also defines a fourth appeal, war aims. However, because this fourth aim supports the other topoi, it is often not identified as a separate category. Due to these appeals, “American presidents have been able to impart a positive value to [the nation’s wars] as well as justify the nation’s involvement." By understanding the persuasiveness of these appeals, Reid believes one can better understand wartime behavior.

Ronald F. Reid (c. 1928–2002), a professor of Communication Studies at the University of Massachusetts Amherst at Amherst, retired in 1991 after 32 years of teaching. Reid received a bachelor's from Pepperdine, a master's from University of New Mexico, and a Ph.D. from Purdue.

=== Territorial appeals ===
Territorial appeals “taps into the ‘lower’ instincts we share with the animal kingdom." As most animal species “mark off units of physical space” as “theirs” and will fight to retain that space, “many countries, led by the U.S., have developed a global sense of territoriality.” As a result, nations “regard physical space as property” and are prepared to defend that property. The object of the territorial appeal is to gain support for war by convincing the audience that the country is in danger. Countries are more willing to support war when they feel their land is threatened. Just as “a defending animal’s willingness to fight correlates with the extent to which its territory is invaded,” a human's willingness to fight correlates with the extent to which his country is threatened.

==== Expansionism ====
Territorial appeals are often used to portray “expansionism as defensive by depicting it as a response to an existing outside threat or honorable effort to recover territory” that was unfairly taken. Thus, through territorial appeal, “even unjustified American imperialism…can be characterized as defensive.”

==== Encroachment appeals ====
Encroachment appeals are reminiscent of the domino theory. By “narrating recent ‘encroachments’ along the frontier,” the orator proposes these seemingly isolated attacks are part of a bigger takeover conspiracy.

==== Metaphysical appeals ====
There are some ideas/virtues countries assume as property. “A populace may be motivated to embark upon a course of war because of the threat posed to its national ideals by a competing ideology." Therefore, an orator can demonstrate a metaphysical territorial appeal by showing a threat to these ideals.

=== Ethnocentric appeals ===
The Ethnocentric Appeal states that if the individuals in a culture belong and identify to it, they are likely to think their culture is superior to other cultures. Ordinary ethnocentricity tends to lead those of a culture to ignore "outsiders." The Ethnocentric Appeal concentrates on creating an ‘Us vs. Them’ mentality. According to ethnocentricity, individuals often see their culture as superior to others. Therefore, when an orator is able to “establish a ‘realistic’ image of the enemy's savagery,” he “eliminate[s] peace as a viable alternative to war." For example, during the American Revolution, the government told the people "God's plan of history called for progress, and the Revolution was an integral part of that plan." This sets up the notion that "they" were "evil" and we are "good" because God is on our side.

==== Emotional intensity ====
Pro-war rhetoric must "arouse ethnocentrism to a high level of emotional intensity." To achieve this:

1. The outsider must be hated. To create hatred, orators use “decivilizing vehicles – including references to acts of nature, mechanized processes, predaceous animals, barbarous actions, and violent crimes."
2. The opposing culture must be shown as a possible threat, using "intense language which exploits the most basic and strongly held cultural values." By making the opposing culture appear threatening, people of the "superior culture" will have more reason to be defensive.

=== Appeals to optimism ===
An Appeal to Optimism creates the illusion war is not bad and that it has its positives. This can be achieved in four ways:

1. By controlling the news, don't tell the public what is going poorly.
2. Don't give the impression of being unprepared.
3. Show we’re stronger than our “enemy” through our “nation’s material strengths."
4. Use scapegoats to blame for wartime losses; “when the scapegoats are removed, victory will follow." Reagan's war on drugs “absolve[d] individuals of direct blame for their addictions and instead concentrate[d] on substances and nebulous ‘drug criminals’ as the enemies." Also, this is trying to show the audience that we are winning the war in different ways. This appeal uses spiritual phrases and phrases that show the strength of the military. “The necessity of protecting [a country's] ideals ‘transcends limited human powers'." This appeal is intended to instill hope and confidence for a victory in the audience's mind.

=== Appeals to war aims ===
War Aims support former appeals and provide an ending goal for the war. Missions “rhetorically create the sense of an objective response." Nations want to bring about more peace and security. For example, the war aims for security protect from future territorial threats of enemies. Permanent peace will ensure security. If “the aim is total overthrow of the enemy,” the language is ambiguous, unclear, and utopian. For example, “We seek to create a massive change." If the “aims reflects a desire for security,” the language expresses clear anticipated results. Presidents will “define an issue [and] the possible resolutions to that issue."

== Rhetorical framework of Robert Ivie ==
According to Ivie, pro-war rhetoric identifies three topoi; force vs. freedom, irrational vs. rational, and aggression vs. defense.

=== Force vs. freedom ===
This tactic portrays to the audience that they are entering war to provide freedom, and the opponent to force their values upon others (Ivie 284). This is accomplished by implying that the opponent is violent, while the audience's nation is willing to negotiate (Ivie 284).

=== Irrational vs. rational ===
This topos holds that the enemy is portrayed as irrational, responding "more to animalistic drives than principles of law" (Ivie 288). The enemy has an unenlightened intellect, not based on reason. Rhetors use this argument to prove that when an enemy such as this threatens the well-being of the world, even for a nation committed to neutrality and peace, war is the only choice (Ivie 289).

=== Aggression vs. defense ===
This idea portrays the enemy as the voluntary aggressor and the nation of the audience as the passive victims of aggression, only entering into war to ensure security (Ivie 290). "While the savage has acted against order, the victim has been forced to respond in its defense" (Ivie 290). Ivie describes the actions as either "voluntary" and "initial" or "involuntary" and "defensive" (Ivie 290). The purpose of this topos is to lay the blame on the enemy and justify reasons for the victimized nation to engage in action.

== Examples ==
- Woodrow Wilson Urges Congress to Declare War on Germany - Woodrow Wilson's April 2, 1917 speech advising Congress to declare war on Germany
- Pearl Harbor speech - Franklin D. Roosevelt's address to Congress after the Japanese attacked Pearl Harbor on December 8, 1941
- German Declaration of War on the United States - Adolf Hitler's December 11, 1941 Reichstag speech
- Gulf of Tonkin Incident - Lyndon B. Johnson's August 5, 1964 message to Congress
- Bush's War Rhetoric Reveals the Anxiety that Iran Commands - A 2007 article from The Washington Post outlining how George W. Bush's rhetoric on Iran (and elsewhere) was often coupled with fear of World War III and/or nuclear annihilation.

== Bibliography ==
- Brock, Bernard L., ed. Kenneth Burke and the 21st Century. Albany: State University of New York P, 1999.
- Ivie, Robert L. "Images of Savagery in American Justifications for War," Communication Monographs 47 (1980): 279–294.
- Ivie, Robert L. "The Rhetoric of Bush's "War" on Evil." KB Journal 1 (2004). 2 Feb. 2007 <https://web.archive.org/web/20070927230132/http://kbjournal.org/node/53>.
- Reid, Ronald F. "New England Rhetoric And the French War, 1754-1760: A Case Study In the Rhetoric of War," Communication Monographs 43 (1976): 259–286.
