= Truman Doctrine =

Anti-Soviet U.S. Cold War foreign policy

Truman Doctrine Era
- 1947–1953
Aftermath of WW2	Containment
- Key events: Implementation of the Marshall Plan; Berlin Airlift (1948–1949); Formation of NATO (1949); Outbreak of the Korean War (1950)

The Truman Doctrine is a U.S. foreign policy that pledges American support for U.S.-aligned nations against alleged authoritarian threats. The doctrine originated with the primary goal of countering the growth of the Soviet bloc during the Cold War. It was announced to Congress by President Harry S. Truman on March 12, 1947, and further developed on July 4, 1948, when he pledged to oppose the communist rebellions in Greece and Soviet demands on Turkey. More generally, the Truman Doctrine implied U.S. support for other nations threatened by the Soviet Union. It led to the formation of NATO in 1949. Historians often use Truman's speech to Congress on March 12, 1947, to date the start of the Cold War.

Truman told Congress that "it must be the policy of the United States to support free peoples who are resisting attempted subjugation by armed minorities or by outside pressures." Truman contended that because totalitarian regimes coerced free peoples, they automatically represented a threat to international peace and the national security of the United States. Truman argued that if Greece and Turkey did not receive the aid, they would inevitably fall out of the United States' sphere of influence and into the communist bloc, with grave consequences throughout the region.

The Truman Doctrine was informally extended to become the basis of American Cold War policy throughout Europe and around the world. It shifted U.S. policy toward the Soviet Union from a wartime alliance to containment of Soviet expansion, as advocated by diplomat George F. Kennan.

== Turkish Straits crisis ==
At the conclusion of World War II, Turkey was pressured by the Soviet government to allow Soviet shipping to flow freely through the Turkish Straits, which connected the Black Sea to the Mediterranean. As the Turkish government would not submit to the Soviet Union's requests, tensions arose in the region, leading to a show of naval force on the site of the Straits. Since British assistance to Turkey had ended in 1947, the U.S. dispatched military aid to ensure that Turkey would retain chief control of the passage. Turkey received $100 million in economic and military aid and the U.S. Navy sent the Midway-class aircraft carrier USS Franklin D. Roosevelt.

== Greek crisis ==
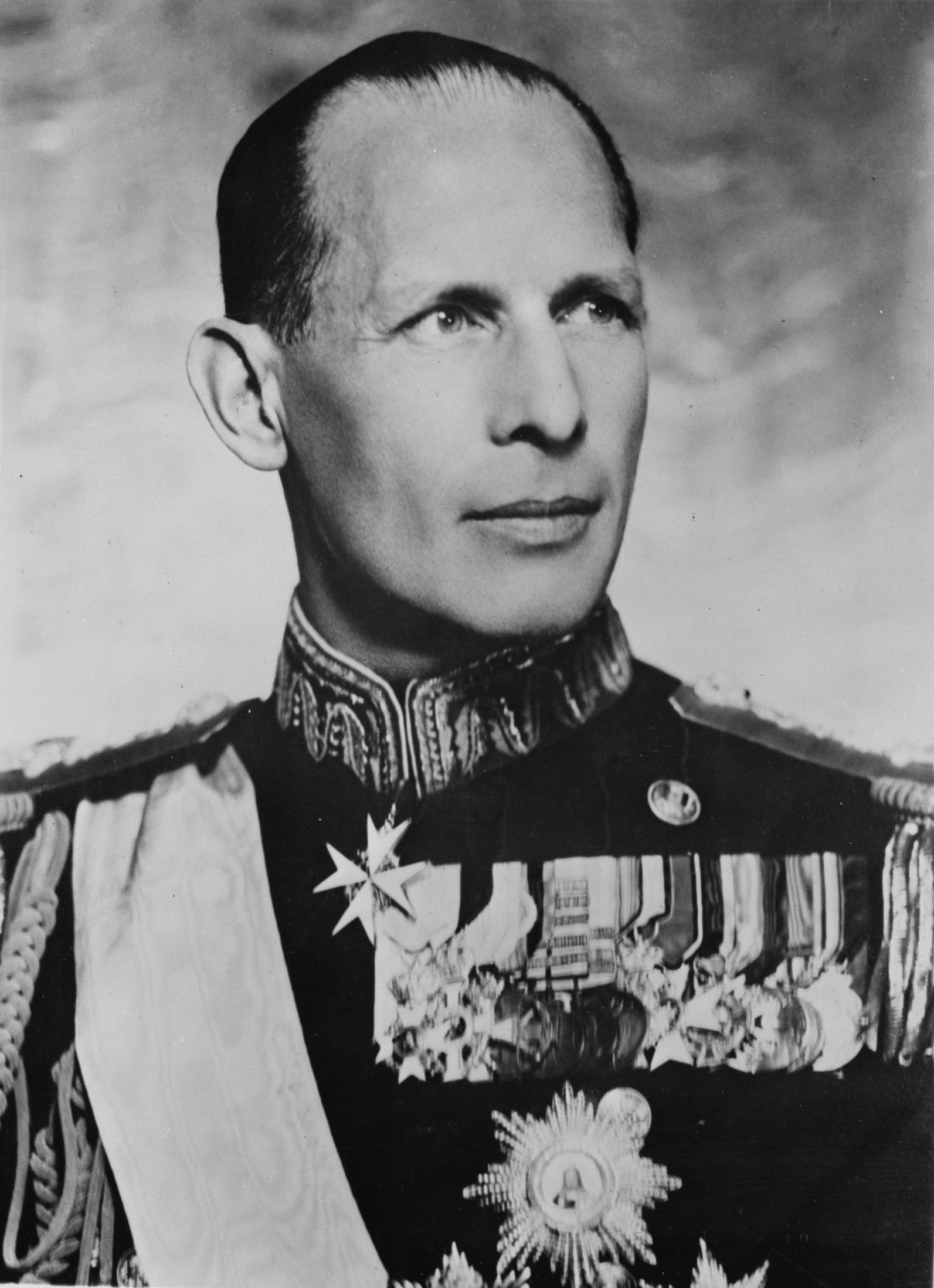
King George II of Greece (r. 1922–24, 1935–1947), whose rule was opposed by communist insurgents in the Greek Civil War

In October 1944, British and Greek forces landed in Greece following the gradual withdrawal of Axis occupational forces from the country. Despite the Caserta Agreement stipulating that all Greek resistance factions would join a new Greek Army under British command, General Ronald Scobie ordered the EAM's armed wing, ELAS, to unilaterally disarm on December 1, 1944. EAM responded to the "Scobie Order" by organizing a rally in Athens on December 3 in protest, which was fired upon by Greek security forces, killing 28 protestors. This sparked the Dekemvriana, a series of clashes between EAM and Greek government forces along with their British allies. It ended in EAM's defeat and disarmament under the terms of the Treaty of Varkiza, which marked the end of ELAS and broke EAM's power. This was followed by the White Terror, a period of persecution against Greek leftists, which contributed to the outbreak of the Greek Civil War in 1946.

After the civil war broke out, Communist Party of Greece (KKE) guerrillas revolted against the internationally recognized Greek government which was formed after elections in 1946 which were boycotted by the KKE. The British realized that the KKE were being directly funded by Josip Broz Tito in neighboring Yugoslavia. In line with the Anglo-Soviet percentages agreement, the KKE received no help from the Soviet Union, and Yugoslavia provided them support and sanctuary against Joseph Stalin's wishes. By late 1946, Britain informed the U.S. that due to its own declining economy, it could no longer continue to provide military and economic support to the Greek government.

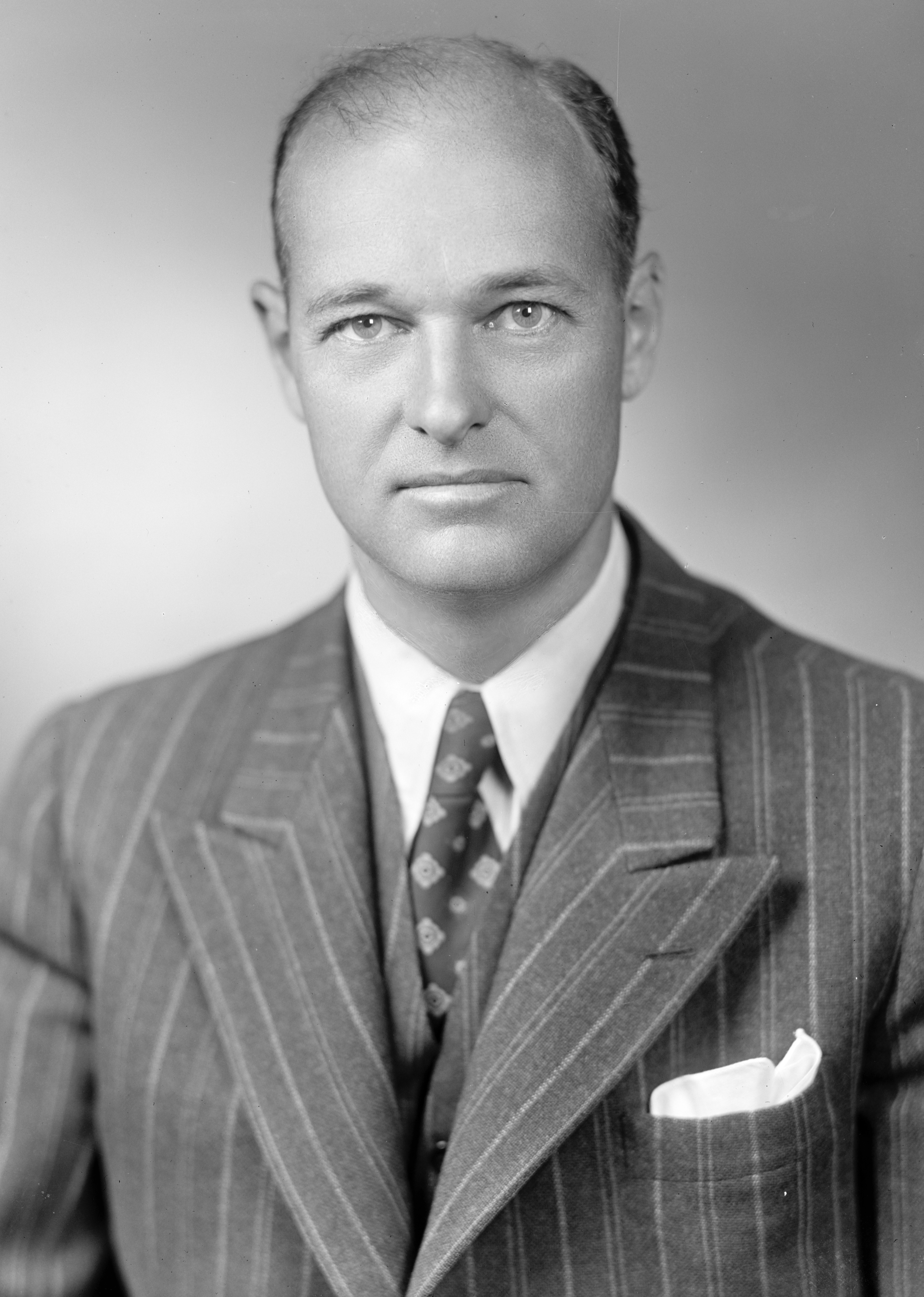
George F. Kennan proposed the doctrine of containment in 1946

In 1946–1947, the United States and the Soviet Union moved from being wartime allies to Cold War adversaries. The breakdown of Allied cooperation in Germany provided a backdrop of escalating tensions for the Truman Doctrine. To Truman, the growing unrest in Greece began to look like a pincer movement against the oil-rich areas of the Middle East and the warm-water ports of the Mediterranean. In February 1946, George F. Kennan, an American diplomat in Moscow, sent his famed "Long Telegram", which predicted the Soviets would only respond to force and that the best way to handle them would be through a long-term strategy of containment; that is, stopping their geographical expansion. After the British warned that they could no longer help Greece, and following Prime Minister Konstantinos Tsaldaris's visit to Washington, D.C. in December 1946 to ask for assistance, the U.S. State Department formulated a plan. Aid would be given to both Greece and Turkey, in an effort to strengthen them against communist forces while cooling their rivalry to keep them both in the Western camp.

American policy makers recognized the instability of the region, fearing that if Greece was lost to communism, Turkey would not last long. Similarly, if Turkey yielded to Soviet demands, the position of Greece would be endangered. A regional domino effect threat therefore guided the American decision. Greece and Turkey were strategic allies important for geographical reasons as well, for the fall of Greece would put the Soviets on a particularly dangerous flank for the Turks, and strengthen the Soviet Union's ability to cut off allied supply lines in the event of war.

== Truman's address ==
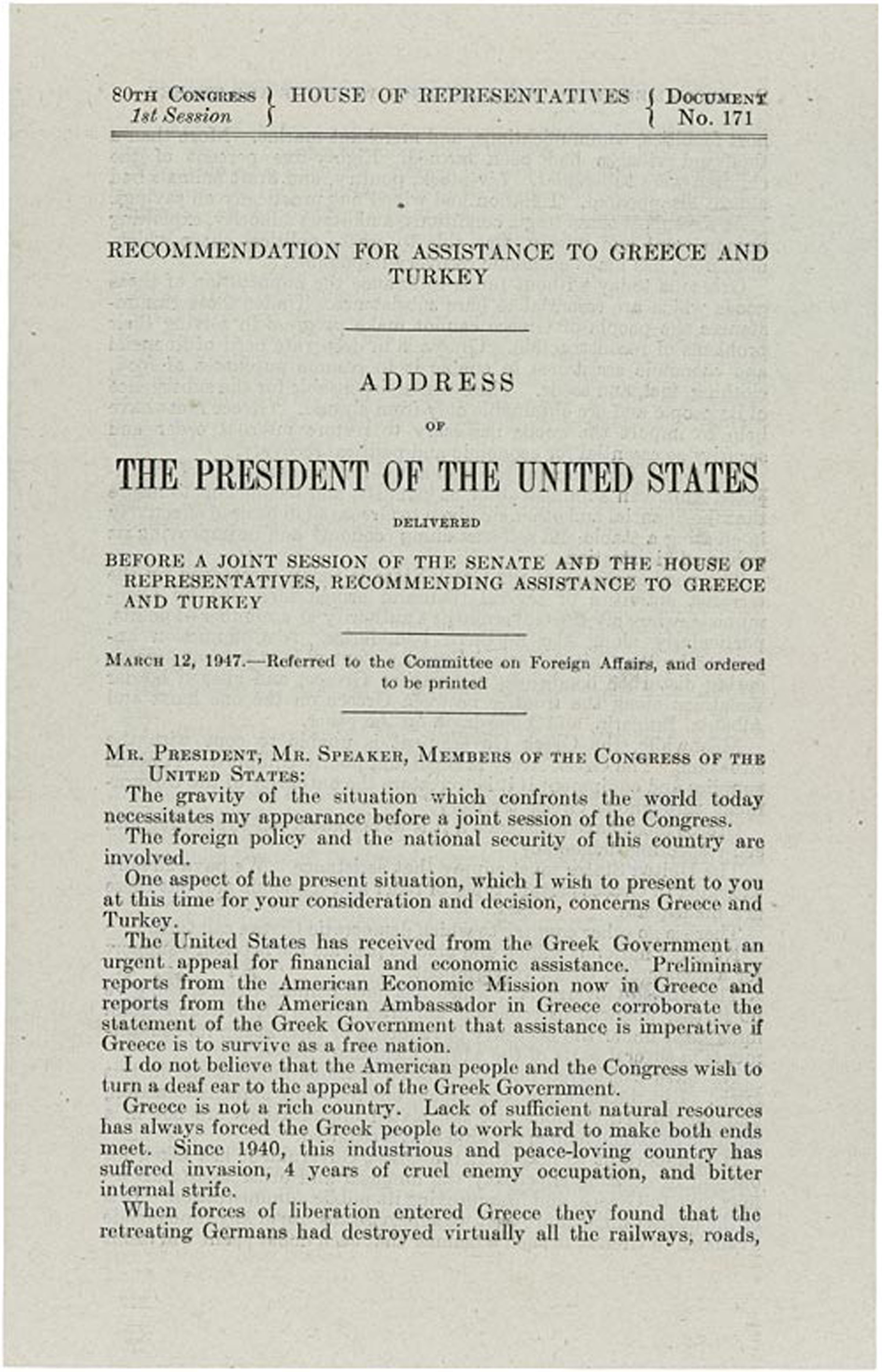
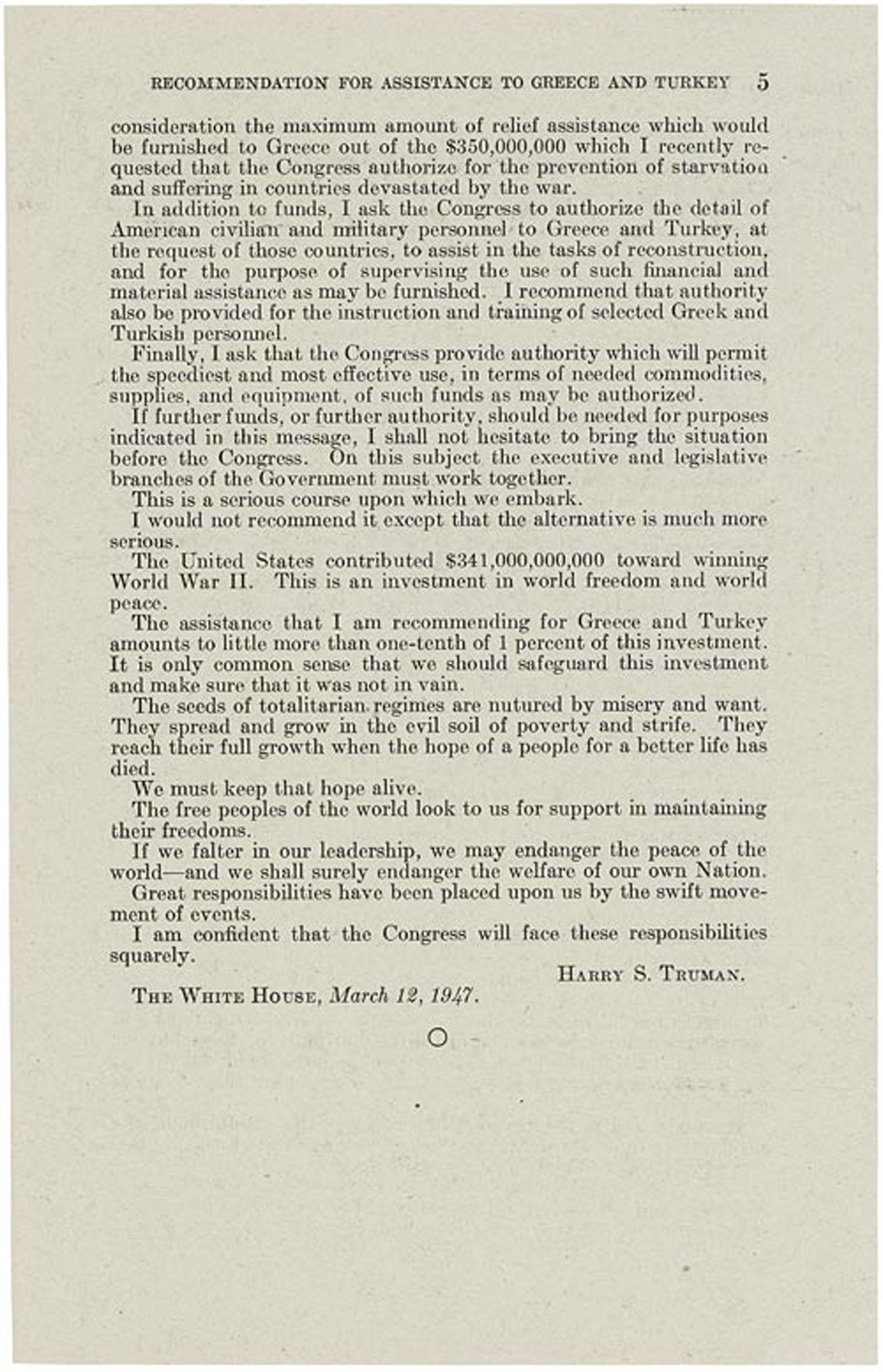
Truman's 1947 message to Congress, recommending assistance to Greece and Turkey

To pass any legislation, Truman needed the support of the Republicans, who controlled both houses of Congress. The chief Republican spokesman Senator Arthur Vandenberg strongly supported Truman and overcame the doubts of isolationists such as Senator Robert A. Taft. Truman laid the groundwork for his request by having key congressional leaders meet with himself, U.S. Secretary of State George C. Marshall, and Undersecretary of State Dean Acheson. Acheson laid out the "domino theory" in the starkest terms, comparing a communist state to a rotten apple that could spread its infection to an entire barrel. Vandenberg was impressed, and advised Truman to appear before Congress and "scare the hell out of the American people." On March 7, Acheson warned Truman that the communists in Greece could win within weeks without outside aid.

When a draft for Truman's address was circulated to policymakers, Marshall, Kennan, and others criticized it for containing excess "rhetoric." Truman responded that, as Vandenberg had suggested, his request would only be approved if he played up the threat.

On March 12, 1947, Truman appeared before a joint session of Congress. In his eighteen-minute speech, he stated:

I believe it must be the policy of the United States to support free peoples who are resisting attempted subjugation by armed minorities or by outside pressures.

I believe that we must assist free peoples to work out their own destinies in their own way.

I believe that our help should be primarily through economic and financial aid which is essential to economic stability and orderly political processes.

The domestic reaction to Truman's speech was broadly positive, though there were dissenters. Anti-communists in both parties supported both Truman's proposed aid package and the doctrine behind it, and Collier's described it as a "popularity jackpot" for the President. Influential columnist Walter Lippmann was more skeptical, noting the open-ended nature of Truman's pledge; he felt so strongly that he almost came to blows while arguing with Acheson over the doctrine. Others argued that the Greek monarchy Truman proposed to defend was itself a repressive government, rather than a democracy.

Despite these objections, the fear that there was a growing communist threat almost guaranteed the bill's passage. In May 1947, two months after Truman's request, a large majority of Congress approved $400 million in military and economic aid to Greece and Turkey. Increased American aid assisted the Greek government's defeat of the KKE, after interim defeats for government forces from 1946 to 1948. The Truman Doctrine was the first in a series of containment moves by the United States, followed by economic restoration of Western Europe through the Marshall Plan and military containment by the creation of NATO in 1949.

== Long-term policy and metaphor ==
Historian Eric Foner writes that the doctrine "set a precedent for American assistance to anticommunist regimes throughout the world, no matter how undemocratic, and for the creation of a set of global military alliances directed against the Soviet Union."

The Truman Doctrine underpinned American Cold War policy in Europe and around the world. In the words of historian James T. Patterson:

The Truman Doctrine was a highly publicized commitment of a sort the administration had not previously undertaken. Its sweeping rhetoric, promising that the United States should aid all 'free people' being subjugated, set the stage for innumerable later ventures that led to globalisation commitments. It was in these ways a major step.

Historian Dennis Merill argues that the doctrine endured because it addressed broader cultural insecurity regarding modern life in a globalized world. It dealt with Washington's concern over communism's domino effect, it enabled a media-sensitive presentation of the doctrine that won bipartisan support, and it mobilized American economic power to modernize and stabilize unstable regions without direct military intervention. It brought nation-building activities and modernization programs to the forefront of foreign policy.

The Truman Doctrine became a metaphor for aid to keep a nation from communist influence. Truman used disease imagery not only to communicate a sense of impending disaster in the spread of communism but also to create a "rhetorical vision" of containing it by extending a protective shield around non-communist countries throughout the world. It echoed the "quarantine the aggressor" policy Truman's predecessor, Franklin D. Roosevelt, had sought to impose to contain German and Japanese expansion in 1937 ("quarantine" suggested the role of public health officials handling an infectious disease). The medical metaphor extended beyond the immediate aims of the Truman Doctrine in that the imagery, combined with fire and flood imagery evocative of disaster, provided the U.S. with an easy transition to direct military confrontation in later years with the Korean War and the Vietnam War. By framing ideological differences in life or death terms, Truman was able to garner support for this communism-containing policy.

== See also ==
- Containment
- Eisenhower Doctrine
- Foreign policy of the Harry S. Truman administration
- Free World
- Greece–United States relations
- Liberal internationalism
- Reverse Course
- Turkey–United States relations
- Fulton Speech
- Korean War

== Bibliography ==
- Beisner, Robert L. Dean Acheson: A Life in the Cold War (2006).
- Bostdorff, Denise M. Proclaiming the Truman Doctrine: The Cold War Call to Arms (2008) excerpt and text search. Archived 2023-06-30 at the Wayback Machine
- Brands, H. W. Into the Labyrinth: The United States and the Middle East, 1945–1993 (1994) excerpt. Archived 2023-06-30 at the Wayback Machine pp. 12–17.
- Bullock, Alan. Ernest Bevin: Foreign Secretary, 1945–1951 (1983) on British roles
- Capaccio, George. The Marshall Plan and the Truman Doctrine (Cavendish Square, 2017).
- Edwards, Lee. "Congress and the Origins of the Cold War: The Truman Doctrine," World Affairs, Vol. 151, 1989 online edition.
- Frazier, Robert. "Acheson and the Formulation of the Truman Doctrine" Journal of Modern Greek Studies 1999 17(2): 229–251. ISSN 0738-1727
- Frazier, Robert. "Kennan, 'Universalism,' and the Truman Doctrine," Journal of Cold War Studies, Spring 2009, Vol. 11 Issue 2, pp. 3–34.
- Gaddis, John Lewis. "Reconsiderations: Was the Truman Doctrine a Real Turning Point?" Foreign Affairs 1974 52(2): 386–402. ISSN 0015-7120
- Gleason, Abbott. "The Truman Doctrine and the Rhetoric of Totalitarianism." in The Soviet Empire Reconsidered (Routledge, 2019) pp. 11–25.
- Haas, Lawrence J. Harry and Arthur: Truman, Vandenberg, and the Partnership That Created the Free World (U of Nebraska Press, 2016).
- Hinds, Lynn Boyd, and Theodore Otto Windt Jr. The Cold War as Rhetoric: The Beginnings, 1945–1950 (1991) online edition.
- Latrides, John O. and Nicholas X. Rizopoulos. "The International Dimension of the Greek Civil War." World Policy Journal 2000 17(1): 87–103. ISSN 0740-2775 Fulltext: in Ebsco
- Ivie, Robert L. (1999). "Fire, Flood, and Red Fever: Motivating Metaphors of Global Emergency in the Truman Doctrine Speech". Presidential Studies Quarterly. 29 (3): 570–591. doi:10.1111/j.0268-2141.2003.00050.x.
- Jeffrey, Judith S. Ambiguous Commitments and Uncertain Policies: The Truman Doctrine in Greece, 1947–1952 (2000). 257 pp.
- Jones, Howard. “‘A New Kind of War’: America's Global Strategy and the Truman Doctrine in Greece” (1989). 327 pp.
- Kayaoğlu, Barın. "Strategic imperatives, Democratic rhetoric: The United States and Turkey, 1945–52," Cold War History, Aug. 2009, Vol. 9(3). pp. 321–345.
- Kiliç, Emrullah Can, and İ. M. E. R. İtır. "Legacy of the Truman Doctrine on Turkish-American Relations: A Political Economy Perspective." Sosyoekonomi 29.50 (2021): 109-130; online for Turkish perspective. Archived 2023-06-18 at the Wayback Machine.
- Kolko, Joyce; Kolko, Gabriel (1972). The Limits of Power: The World and United States Foreign Policy, 1945–1954. New York: Harper & Row. ISBN 978-0-06-012447-2.
- Leffler, Melvyn P. "Strategy, Diplomacy, and the Cold War: the United States, Turkey, and NATO, 1945–1952" Journal of American History 1985 71(4): 807–825. ISSN 0021-8723 in JSTOR.
- Lykogiannis, Athanasios. Britain and the Greek Economic Crisis, 1944–1947: From Liberation to the Truman Doctrine. (U. of Missouri Press, 2002). 287 pp. online.
- McGhee, George. The U.S.-Turkish-NATO Middle East Connection: How the Truman Doctrine and Turkey's NATO Entry Contained the Soviets in the Middle East. (1990). 224 pp.
- Merrill, Dennis (2006). "The Truman Doctrine: Containing Communism and Modernity". Presidential Studies Quarterly. 36 (1): 27–37. doi:10.1111/j.1741-5705.2006.00284.x.
- Meiertöns, Heiko: The Doctrines of US Security Policy – An Evaluation under International Law (2010). ISBN 978-0-521-76648-7.
- Offner, Arnold A. "'Another Such Victory': President Truman, American Foreign Policy, and the Cold War." Diplomatic History 1999 23(2): 127–155.ISSN 0145-2096
- Pach, Chester J. Jr. Arming the Free World: The Origins of the United States Military Assistance Program, 1945–1950, (1991) online edition.
- Painter, David S. (2012). "Oil and the American Century". The Journal of American History. 99 (1): 24–39. doi:10.1093/jahist/jas073.
- Pieper, Moritz A. (2012). "Containment and the Cold War: Reexaming the Doctrine of Containment as a Grand Strategy Driving US Cold War Interventions". StudentPulse.com. Archived from the original on August 9, 2012.
- Purvis, Hoyt. "Tracing the Congressional Role: US Foreign Policy and Turkey." in Legislating Foreign Policy (Routledge, 2019) pp. 23–76.
- Spalding, Elizabeth Edwards. The First Cold Warrior: Harry Truman, Containment, and the Remaking of Liberal Internationalism (2006) online.
- Spalding, Elizabeth Edwards. "The enduring significance of the Truman doctrine." Orbis 61.4 (2017): 561–574.
