= Rick Hodes =

American physician (born 1953)

- Born: Richard Michael Hodes; May 30, 1953 (age 72)
- Occupation: Doctor

Richard Michael Hodes (born May 30, 1953) is an American physician specializing in cancer, heart disease, and spinal conditions. Since the 1980s he has worked in Ethiopia and has adopted a number of children from the country. He is medical director of the American Jewish Joint Distribution Committee. He is the consultant at a Catholic mission working with sick destitutes suffering from heart disease (rheumatic and congenital), spine disease (TB and scoliosis), and cancer. He has worked with refugees in Rwanda, Zaire, Tanzania, Somalia, and Albania and was previously responsible for the health of Ethiiopians immigrating to Israel.

== Early life and education ==
Born May 30, 1953, Hodes graduated from Middlebury College in Middlebury, Vermont and the University of Rochester Medical School in Rochester, New York, and trained in internal medicine at Johns Hopkins University in Baltimore. He is a diplomate of the American Board of Internal Medicine. He first went to Ethiopia as a relief worker during the 1984 famine. He returned to Ethiopia on a Fulbright Fellowship to teach internal medicine.

== Career ==
In 1990, Hodes was hired by the American Jewish Joint Distribution Committee, a humanitarian group, as the medical advisor for the country. His original position was to care for 25,000 potential immigrants to Israel. In 1991, he was an active contributor during Operation Solomon, helping the Ethiopian Jews airlifted to Israel.

In 2002, Hodes adopted two Ethiopian children, so they could receive treatment in the U.S. for spinal tuberculosis (Pott's disease). He has adopted a total of five children with medical needs from the country.

He opened the JDC Spinal Deformity Clinic in 2006, based at Mother Teresa's Mission. That year, he treated 20 new spine patients, and they performed eleven surgeries in Accra, Ghana. At present, they get around 500 new deformity patients a year. It has been said that he now has the largest collection of the worst spine deformities in the world.

Medical care is free. He partners with Dr. Oheneba Boachie-Adjei of FOCOS Hospital in Accra, where ambulatory traction and complex surgeries are performed. They have done over 1000 surgeries on Ethiopian spine patients. They have approximately 100 youths in "growing rods", either magnetic or standard, possibly the largest growing rod cohort in the world.

In 2007, Hodes was selected as a "CNN Hero", a program that highlights ordinary people for their extraordinary achievements.

The American College of Physicians has awarded him "Mastership", and the Rosenthal Award for creative practice of medicine. Hodes' work in Ethiopia was the subject of an HBO documentary, Making the Crooked Straight, and a Marilyn Berger book, This Is a Soul: The Mission of Rick Hodes.

== Personal life ==
Hodes is a baal teshuva, a secular Jew who has embraced Orthodox Judaism.
