= Marilyn Berger =

American journalist and author

- Born: August 23, 1935 (age 91); New York City, U.S.
- Education: Cornell University; Columbia University Graduate School of Journalism
- Occupations: Journalist; author

Marilyn Berger Hewitt (born August 23, 1935) is an American broadcast and newspaper journalist and author. She worked for newspapers including Newsday, The New York Times and The Washington Post, and hosted local television news programs in New York City.

== Early life and education ==
Berger was born in New York City, on August 23, 1935. She attended Cornell University, where she received her bachelor's degree, and then Columbia University Graduate School of Journalism, where she received a master's degree.

== Career ==
=== Newsday and The Washington Post ===
Berger worked as a foreign correspondent for Newsday on Long Island from 1965 to 1970 where she covered the United Nations and followed, from there, every hour of the six-day war in the Middle East. She also reported from Czechoslovakia during the springtime of Alexander Dubček. From there, she moved on to The Washington Post, where she became a key player in the Watergate scandal. Berger reported that Richard Nixon White House staffer Ken Clawson had bragged to her about authoring the Canuck Letter, a forged letter to the editor of the Manchester Union Leader that played a large part in ending the campaign of Senator Edmund Muskie. She reported on the Cold War arms race and China, where she provided insight into the last days of the Cultural Revolution, and covered Middle East diplomacy often from the vantage point of the Kissinger shuttle. Later, at The New York Times she wrote obituaries of world figures including Ronald Reagan, Mikhail Gorbachev, Boris Yeltsin, Yitzhak Rabin, Simon Peres and Teddy Kollek.

=== NBC News ===
After leaving The Washington Post, Berger went to work for NBC News, where she covered the Pentagon and then the White House, where her duties included on-camera reporting at the 1976 Democratic and Republican National Conventions. She hosted the public television news program The Advocates, and was an anchor on the nightly news on public television station WNET in New York.

=== Author ===
In 2010, Berger wrote This is a Soul: The Mission of Rick Hodes, covering the more than 30-year work of Rick Hodes in Ethiopia saving sick children. It was while she was in Ethiopia that she came upon a sick and homeless boy, whom she later helped raise in her home, as Danny Hodes. He later took the name Daniel Berger Hewitt.

== Personal life ==
In April 1979, Berger married Don Hewitt, creator of 60 Minutes. They remained married until his death in August 2009. The couple had no biological children, but in 2009 (shortly before Hewitt's death), they became guardians of a boy Berger had met in Ethiopia.
