= Christiane Amanpour =

British-Iranian news anchor and international correspondent

Christiane Amanpour CBE
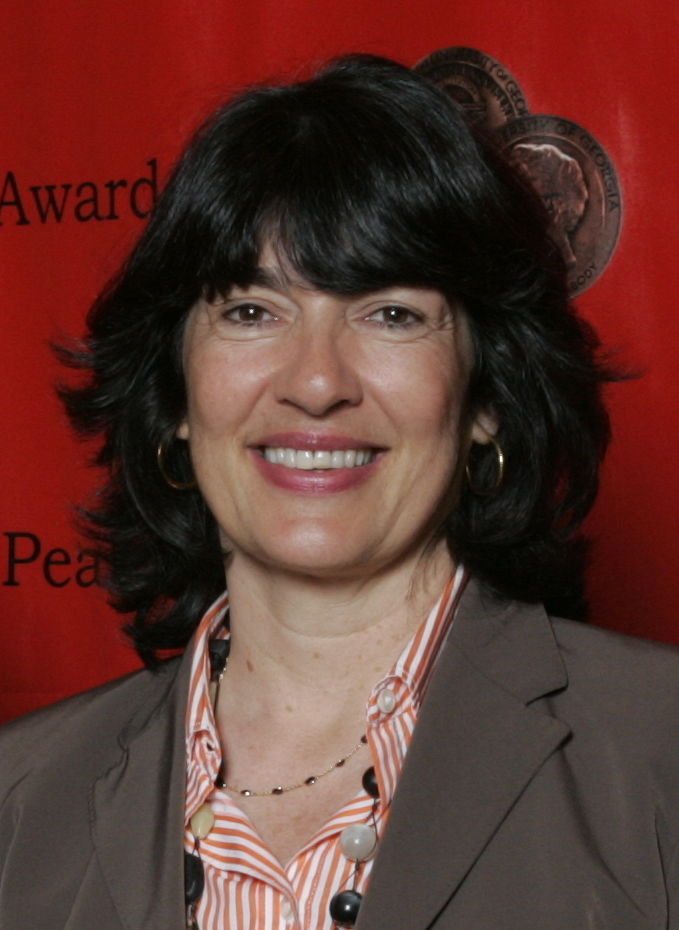
- Amanpour in 2008
- Born: Christiane Maria Heideh Amanpour; 12 January 1958 (age 68); Ealing, Middlesex, England
- Education: University of Rhode Island (BA)
- Occupations: Journalist; television host
- Employer(s): CNN, PBS
- Notable credits: Amanpour (CNN International) Anchor (2009‍–‍2010, 2012‍–‍present); Amanpour & Company (PBS) Anchor (2018‍–‍present); This Week (ABC) Anchor (2010‍–‍2011); 60 Minutes (CBS) Reporter (1996‍–‍2005)
- Spouse: James Rubin (m. 1998; div. 2018)
- Children: 1

Christiane Maria Heideh Amanpour CBE (/ˌkrɪstiˈɑːn ˌɑːmənˈpʊər/; Persian: کریستیان امان‌پور, romanized: Kristiān Amānpur; born 12 January 1958) is an Iranian-British journalist and television host. Amanpour is the Chief International Anchor for CNN and host of CNN International's nightly interview program Amanpour, CNN's The Amanpour Hour on Saturdays and Amanpour & Company on PBS. She also hosts Christiane Amanpour Presents The Ex-Files with her former husband James Rubin on Global.

== Early life and education ==
Amanpour was born in the West London suburb of Ealing, the daughter of Mohammad Taghi Amanpour (Iranian) and Anne Patricia Hill (British). Her father was Shia Muslim and her mother Roman Catholic.

Amanpour was raised in Tehran until the age of eleven, when she was sent to England to attend the Convent of the Holy Cross, an all-girls preparatory boarding school in Chalfont Saint Peter, Buckinghamshire. At 16, she moved to New Hall School, a Roman Catholic school in Chelmsford, Essex.

After finishing her education in England, Amanpour returned to Iran. Her father worked as an airline executive for Iran Air, and lost his job and fortune in 1979 due to the Iran Revolution. In 1979, the family moved to the United States, where she studied journalism at the University of Rhode Island. During her time there, she worked in the news department at WBRU-FM in Providence, Rhode Island. She also worked for NBC affiliate WJAR in Providence as an electronic graphics designer.

In 1983, Amanpour graduated from the university summa cum laude and Phi Beta Kappa with a Bachelor of Arts degree in journalism.

== Career ==
=== 1983–2010: Cable News Network (CNN) ===
In 1983, Amanpour was hired by CNN on the foreign desk in Atlanta, Georgia, as an entry-level desk assistant. By 1986, she served as a correspondent for CNN's New York bureau. During her early years as a correspondent, she was given her first major assignment covering the Iran–Iraq War, followed by a transfer in 1986 to Eastern Europe to report on the fall of European communism. In 1989, she was assigned to work in Frankfurt am Main, West Germany, where she reported on the democratic revolutions sweeping Eastern Europe at the time.

Following Iraq's occupation of Kuwait in 1990, Amanpour's reports of the Persian Gulf War brought her wide notice. Thereafter, she reported from the Bosnian war and other conflict zones. While in Bosnia, she interviewed Serb general Ratko Mladic, who would later be convicted of genocide. Because of her emotional delivery from Sarajevo during the Siege of Sarajevo, viewers and critics questioned her professional objectivity, claiming that many of her reports were unjustified and favoured the Bosnian Muslims, to which she replied:

"There are some situations one simply cannot be neutral about, because when you are neutral, you are an accomplice. Objectivity doesn't mean treating all sides equally. It means giving each side a hearing."

Amanpour gained a reputation for fearlessness during the Gulf and Bosnian wars for reporting from conflict areas.

From 1992 to 2010, Amanpour was CNN's chief international correspondent. From 2009 to 2010, she was the anchor of Amanpour, a daily CNN interview program. Amanpour has reported on major crises from many of the world's hotspots, including Iraq, Afghanistan, Palestine, Iran, Israel, Pakistan, Somalia, Rwanda, and the Balkans and from the United States during Hurricane Katrina. She has secured exclusive interviews with world leaders from the Middle East to Europe, Africa and beyond, including Iranian presidents Mohammad Khatami and Mahmoud Ahmadinejad, as well as the presidents of Afghanistan, Sudan, and Syria, among others. After 9/11, she was the first international correspondent to interview British Prime Minister Tony Blair, French President Jacques Chirac, and Pakistani President Pervez Musharraf. Other interviewees have included Hillary Clinton, Nicolás Maduro, Hassan Rouhani, Emmanuel Macron, Angela Merkel, John Kerry, the Dalai Lama, Robert Mugabe and Moammar Gadhafi.

She has also conducted interviews with Constantine II of Greece, Reza Pahlavi, Ameera al-Taweel and actors Angelina Jolie, Tom Hanks and Meryl Streep.

From 1996 to 2005, she was contracted by 60 Minutes creator Don Hewitt to file four to five in-depth international news reports a year as a special contributor. These reports garnered her a Peabody Award in 1998 (she had earlier been awarded one in 1993). Hewitt's successor Jeff Fager terminated her contract.

==== During the Bosnian War ====
On 9 October 1994, Stephen Kinzer of The New York Times criticized Amanpour's general coverage of the Bosnian War. Kinzer quoted a colleague's description of Amanpour as she reported on a terrorist bombing in the Markale marketplace of the Bosnian city of Sarajevo:

[Christiane Amanpour] was sitting in Belgrade when that marketplace massacre happened, and she went on air to say that the Serbs had probably done it. There was no way she could have known that. She assumed an omniscience that no journalist has.

Amanpour has responded to the criticism levelled on her reporting from the war in the former Yugoslavia for "lack of neutrality", stating:

Some people accused me of being pro–Muslim in Bosnia, but I realized that our job is to give all sides an equal hearing, but in cases of genocide, you can't just be neutral. You can't just say, "Well, this little boy was shot in the head and killed in besieged Sarajevo and that guy over there did it, but maybe he was upset because he argued with his wife." No, there is no equality, and we had to tell the truth.

In 2019, retired commander of the Islamic Revolutionary Guards Corps Saeed Qassemi spoke of his and his comrades' participation as combatants in the Bosnian War, with him having been disguised as staff of the Iranian Red Crescent Society. Shortly after, in April 2019, Qassemi claimed that Amanpour had uncovered their deception.

=== 2010–2012: ABC News ===
On 18 March 2010, Amanpour announced she would leave CNN for ABC News, where she would anchor This Week. She said, "I'm thrilled to be joining the incredible team at ABC News. Being asked to anchor This Week in the superb tradition started by David Brinkley is a tremendous and rare honor, and I look forward to discussing the great domestic and international issues of the day. I leave CNN with the utmost respect, love, and admiration for the company and everyone who works here. This has been my family and shared endeavor for the past 27 years, and I am forever grateful and proud of all that we have accomplished." She hosted her first broadcast on 1 August 2010.

During her first two months as host, the ratings for This Week reached their lowest point since 2003. On 28 February 2011, she interviewed Muammar Gaddafi and his sons Saif al-Islam and Al-Saadi Gaddafi.

On 13 December 2011, ABC announced Amanpour would be leaving her post as anchor of ABC News' This Week on 8 January 2012 and returning to CNN International, where she had previously worked for 27 years and maintained a reporting role at ABC News.

=== Since 2012: Return to CNN ===
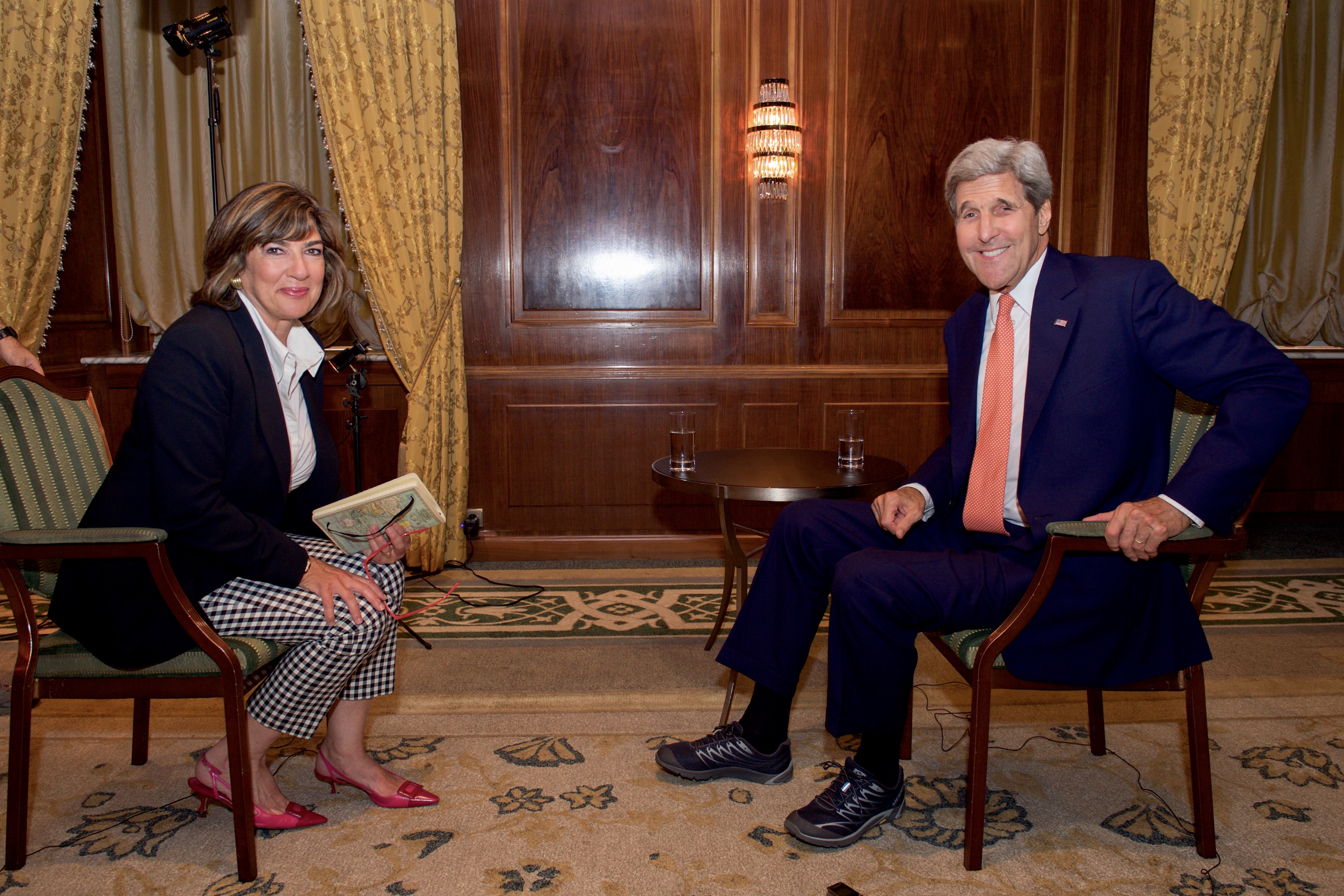
Amanpour with former U.S. Secretary of State, John Kerry, in Vienna, Austria, on 14 July 2015

A day later on 14 December 2011, in statements by ABC and CNN, it was announced that in a "unique arrangement", Amanpour would begin hosting a program on CNN International in 2012 while continuing at ABC News as a global affairs anchor.

It was later revealed that in the spring of 2012, CNN International would refresh its line-up, putting the interview show Amanpour back on air. On-air promotions said she would return to CNN International on 16 April. Her 30-minute New York-recorded show – to be screened twice an evening – would mean that the US parent network's Piers Morgan Tonight interview show would be "bumped" out of its 9:00 p.m. (Central European Time) slot to midnight (CET).

On 9 September 2013, the show and staff were moved to the CNN International office and the show is currently being produced and broadcast from London.

On 7 January 2015, Amanpour made headlines during a "Breaking News" segment on CNN by referring to the Islamic extremists who murdered the 12 journalists at Charlie Hebdo as "activists": "On this day, these activists found their targets, and their targets were journalists. This was a clear attack on the freedom of expression, on the press, and on satire".

On 28 January 2019, Christiane Amanpour and Mary Ellen Schmider and Manfred Philipp gave the Fulbright Prize for International Understanding to the German Chancellor Angela Merkel.

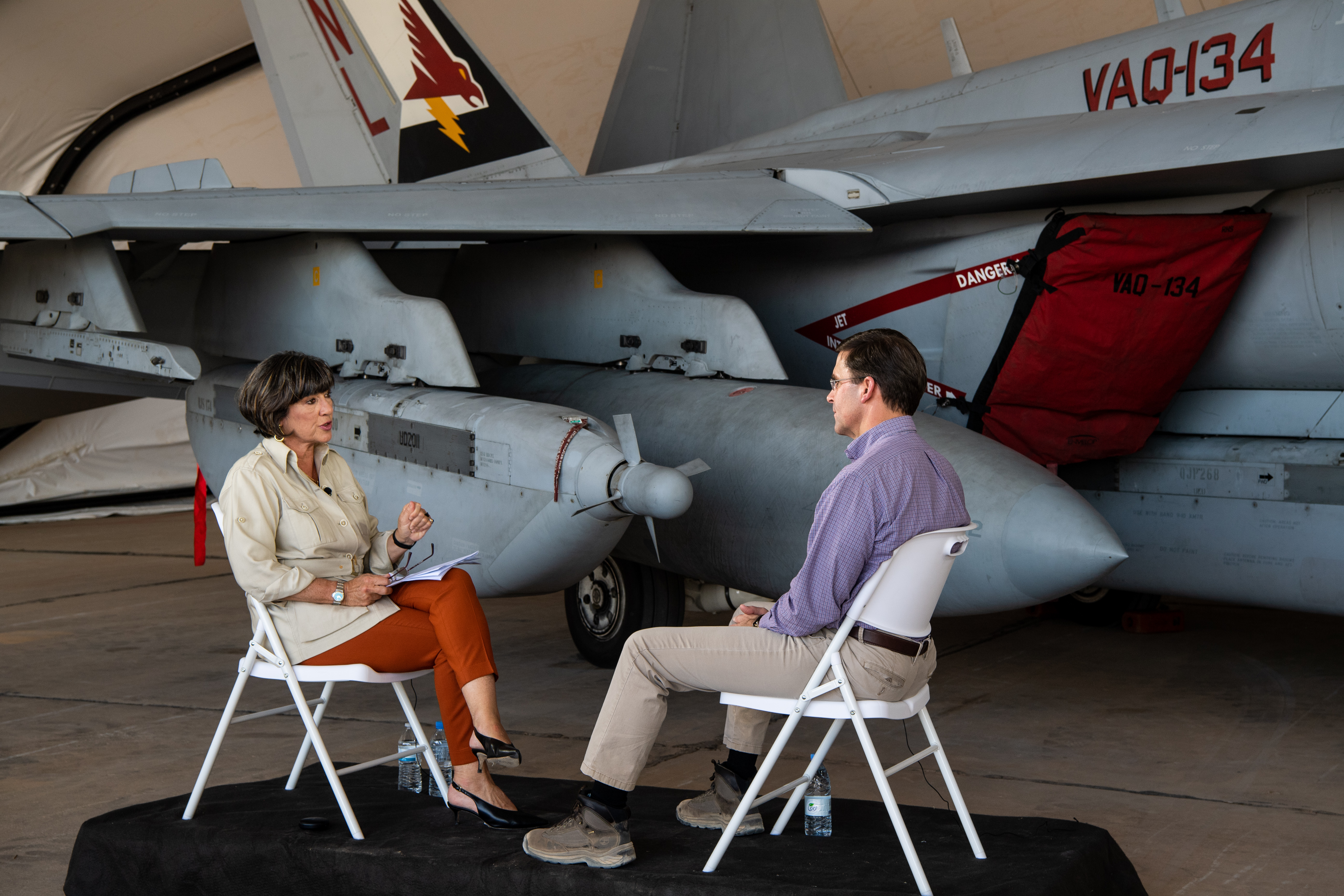
Amanpour interviewing Secretary of Defense Mark Esper in 2019, in front of a wing-mount ram air turbine

On 12 November 2020, Amanpour compared the Trump administration to the Nazis and Kristallnacht, saying, "It was the Nazis' warning shot across the bow of our human civilization that led to genocide against a whole identity, and in that tower of burning books, it led to an attack on fact, knowledge, history and truth. After four years of a modern-day assault on those same values by Donald Trump, the Biden-Harris team pledges a return to norms, including the truth." The Israeli government, along with some Jewish groups, called for Amanpour to apologize for this comparison. Israeli Diaspora Affairs Minister Omer Yankelevich urged an "immediate and public apology" for "belittling of the immense tragedy of the Holocaust."

In February 2024, CNN employees, including Amanpour, confronted network executives over what they deemed to be double standards in coverage of Israel's war in Gaza. In May 2025, the podcast "Christiane Amanpour Presents: The Ex Files with Jamie Rubin" was launched by Amanpour and her former husband James Rubin on Global.

==== Refusal to wear a headscarf ====
In September 2022, Amanpour terminated a scheduled TV interview with the former President of Iran Ebrahim Raisi in New York City during the seventy-seventh session of the United Nations General Assembly, following a last–minute demand that she wear a Chador headscarf while filming. Amanpour vehemently responded that she could not agree to the "unprecedented and unexpected condition" and later reflected on the controversial situation, declaring that:

Here in New York City, or anywhere else outside of Iran, I have never been asked by any Iranian president—and I have interviewed every single one of them since 1995—either inside or outside of Iran, never been asked to wear a head scarf.

==== Public Broadcasting Service ====
In May 2018, it was announced that Amanpour would permanently replace Charlie Rose on PBS after he was fired due to allegations of sexual misconduct. Her new program, Amanpour & Company, premiered on PBS on 10 September 2018. From the time of Charlie Rose's departure from PBS until the new show premiered, Amanpour was aired on PBS stations, as Amanpour on PBS.

In 2020, Amanpour hosted the PBS daily program Amanpour & Company from her home in England due to the COVID-19 pandemic. Her program continues to be seen on television on PBS at many stations in various areas of the US, including at least four TV stations in the greater Los Angeles region of southern California.

==== Departure from CNN ====
On 19 October 2026, she announced her planned departure from PBS and CNN in December 2026 and June 2027 respectively. She will scale back her work over nine months, concluding her daily program at the end of 2026 before concluding her weekly program in June of 2027.

== Affiliations ==
Amanpour is a member of the Council on Foreign Relations, a member of the board of directors of the Committee to Protect Journalists, the Center for Public Integrity, the International Women's Media Foundation, and the Institute for War and Peace Reporting. Since April 2015 she has served as a UNESCO Goodwill Ambassador for Freedom of Expression and journalist safety.

== Personal life ==
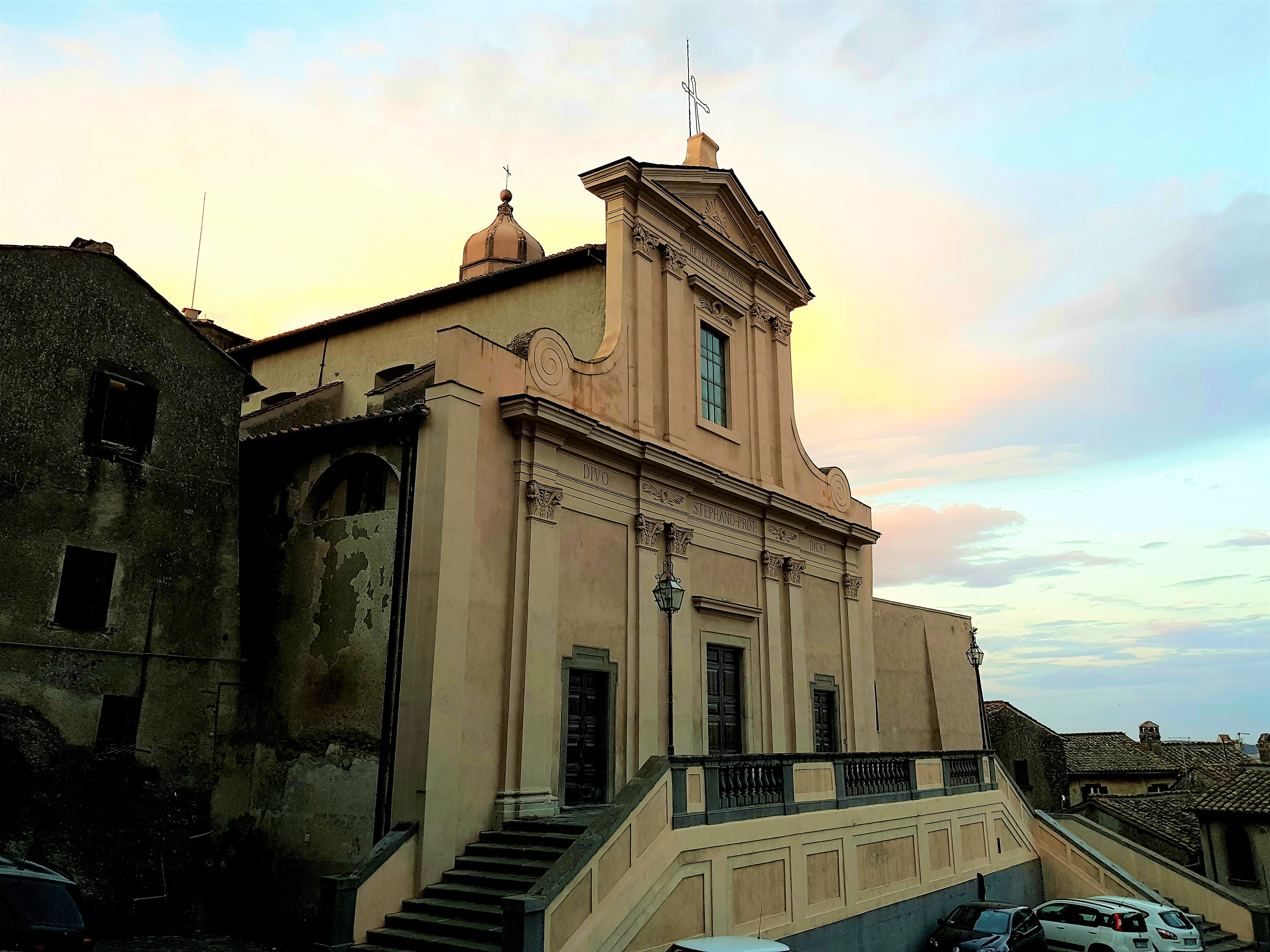
The Church of Saint Stephen the Martyr (1427), where Amanpour and James Phillip Rubin had their Catholic wedding in 1998. Bracciano, Italy.

On 9 August 1998, Amanpour married James Rubin at the Roman Catholic parish of Saint Stephen the Protomartyr in Bracciano, Italy. The wedding was officiated by Catholic priest Father Ambrose O’Farrell of the Dominican Order. Rubin is a former United States Assistant Secretary of State and spokesman for the United States Department of State during the Presidency of Bill Clinton and an informal adviser to former U.S. Secretary of State Hillary Clinton and to former American President Barack Obama. In July 2009 she appeared in a Harper's Bazaar magazine article entitled "Christiane Amanpour Gets a High-Fashion Makeover".

She conceived at the age of 42, and their son John Darius Rubin was born in Columbia Hospital for Women on 27 March 2000. Having lived in London since 2000, they moved to New York City in 2010, where they rented an apartment in Manhattan's Upper West Side. In May 2013, Rubin announced that the family would return to London to work on several projects, and in October of the same year, Amanpour stated that she and her husband would be relocating to London permanently. In 2018, Amanpour and Rubin announced they were divorcing.

Amanpour was a relative by marriage to the Jahanbani family. Notable members include Commander–General Nader Jahanbani of the Imperial Iranian Air Force. He served in the Iranian Air Force for nearly twenty years until he was executed by the Islamic Revolutionaries in 1979. Khosrow Jahanbani, Nader Jahanbani's younger brother, was married to Princess Shahnaz Pahlavi. Amanpour's uncle, Captain Nasrallah Amanpour, was married to the younger sister of Khosrow and Nader.

In June 2021, Amanpour announced she had been diagnosed with ovarian cancer, had "major successful surgery to remove it", and would undergo several months of chemotherapy. In October 2025, Amanpour revealed that her ovarian cancer had returned.

== Filmography ==
=== Film ===
Year	Title	Role	Notes	Refs.
2009	The Pink Panther 2	Herself		
2010	Iron Man 2	Herself		

=== Television ===
Year	Title	Role	Notes	Refs.
2007	Gilmore Girls	Herself	Final episode, "Bon Voyage"	
2014	Cosmos: A Spacetime Odyssey	Enheduanna	Eleventh episode, "The Immortals"	
2014	Makers: Women Who Make America	Narrator	Episode "Women in War"	
2024	Disclaimer	Herself	First episode	

=== Radio ===
Year	Title	Role	Notes	Refs.
2016	Desert Island Discs	Herself		

== Honours and recognitions ==
- 1993: Livingston Award for Young Journalists
- 1993: George Polk Award for Television Reporting
- 1993: George Foster Peabody Personal Award
- 1994: Woman of the Year, New York Chapter of "Women in Cable"
- 1994: Courage in Journalism Award, International Women's Media Foundation
- 1995: Honorary Doctor of Laws degree, University of Rhode Island
- 1996: George Polk Award for Television Reporting
- 1997: Honorary Doctor of Humane Letters degree, Emory University
- 1997: Nymphe d'Honneur at the Monte Carlo Television Festival
- 1998: George Foster Peabody Personal Award for International Reporting
- 2000: Golden Plate Award of the American Academy of Achievement
- 2002: Edward R. Murrow Award for Distinguished Achievement in Broadcast Journalism
- 2002: Goldsmith Career Award for Excellence in Journalism, at Harvard Kennedy School
- 2005: International Emmy, International Academy of Television Arts and Sciences
- 2006: Honorary citizen, city of Sarajevo
- 2006: Honorary doctorate degree from the University of Michigan for her contributions to journalism
- 2007: Paul White Award, Radio Television Digital News Association
- 23 October 2007: Appointed by Queen Elizabeth II Commander of the Order of the British Empire in the 2007 Birthday Honours for services to journalism.
- 2007: Persian Woman of the Year
- 2008: The Fourth Estate Award (National Press Club)
- 2008: Celebrating Women Award from The New York Women's Foundation
- 2010: Fellow of the American Academy of Arts and Sciences
- 2010: Honorary doctorate of humane letters degree, Northwestern University
- 2010: Honorary doctorate from Georgia State University for her contributions to journalism
- 2010: Honorary member of the graduating class of 2010 of Harvard College
- 2011: Walter Cronkite Award for Excellence in Journalism from Walter Cronkite School of Journalism and Mass Communication
- 2012: Honorary doctorate of humane letters, Amherst College
- 2012: Honorary doctorate of humane letters, University of Southern California
- 2015: TV Personality of the Year by Association for International Broadcasting
- 2019: Received the John Peter and Anna Catherine Zenger Award for Press Freedom from the University of Arizona School of Journalism.
- 2022: Daily Kos marked her among trailblazing women of history born between 9 through 16 January along with three other Iranians, Taraneh Alidoosti (Actress), Kimia Alizadeh (athlete), and Nadia Maftouni (Philosopher).
- 2022: Larry Foster Award for Integrity in Public Communication, Arthur W. Page Center for Integrity in Public Communication
- 2023: Ivan Allen Jr. Prize for Social Courage
- 2023: Hillary Rodham Clinton Award for Courageous Women in Journalism and Peacebuilding, received in a ceremony at Georgetown University, along with 3 other women: Alaa Salah, Muna Luqman, and Ghalia Alrahhal.
- 2024: Sol Taishoff Award for Excellence in Broadcast Journalism, National Press Foundation.
- 2025: Ellis Island Medal of Honor
- 2025: J. William Fulbright Prize for International Understanding.
- 2025: James W. Foley World Press Freedom Award.
- 2026: Honorary Doctorate degree, University College London

== See also ==
- List of Iranian women journalists
