= Clarissa Ward =

British-American television journalist (born 1980)

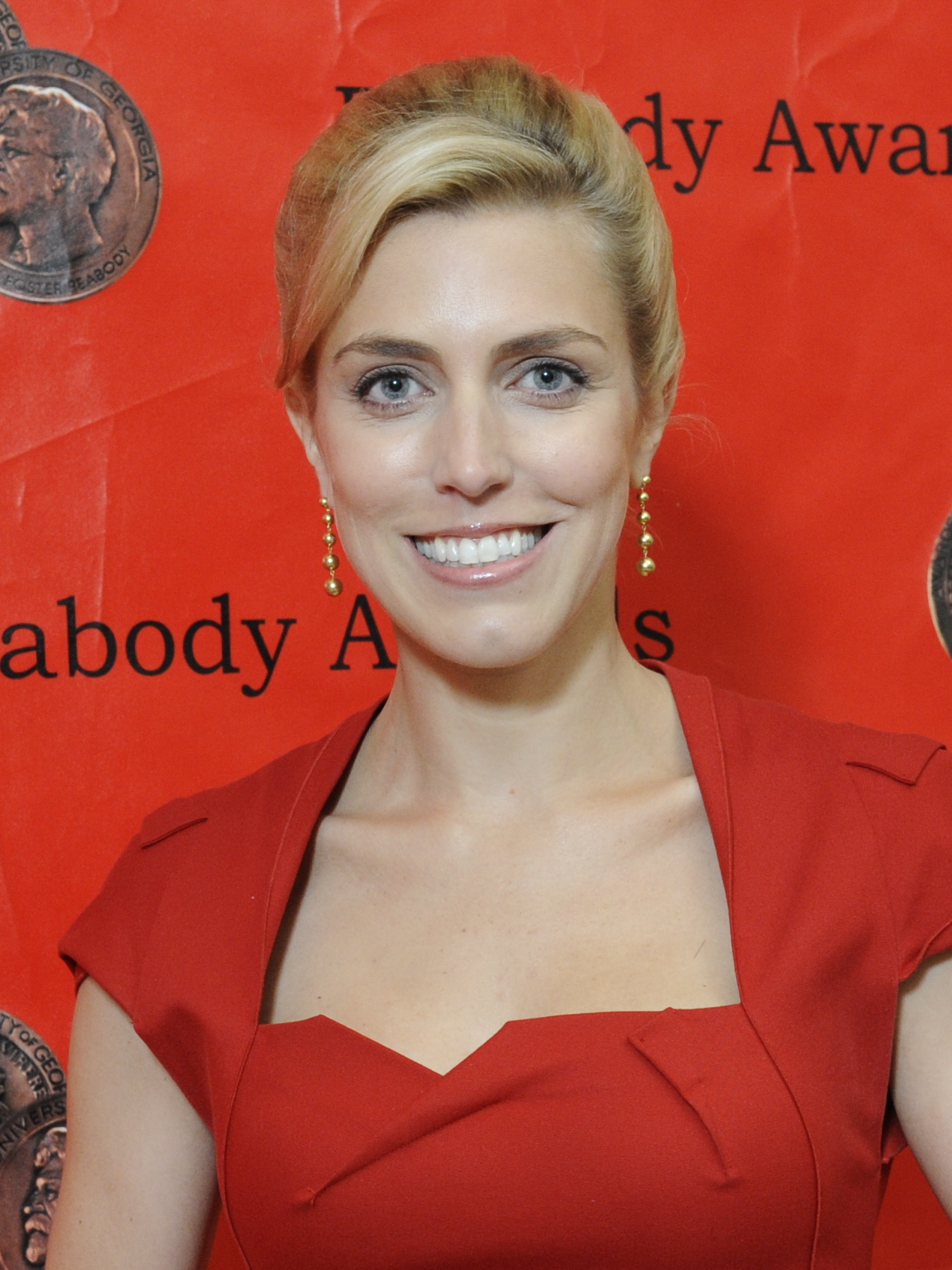
- Ward in 2012
- Born: January 31, 1980 (age 46); London, England
- Education: Yale University (BA)
- Occupation: Journalist
- Years active: 2003–present
- Notable credit: CBS News
- Spouse: Philipp von Bernstorff (m. 2016)
- Children: 3

Clarissa Ward (born January 31, 1980) is a British-American television journalist who is the chief international correspondent for CNN. Previously, she was with CBS News, based in London. Before her CBS News position, Ward was a Moscow-based news correspondent for ABC News programs.

== Early life ==
Ward was born in London to a British father and American mother. She grew up in London and New York City and attended the Godstowe and Wycombe Abbey boarding schools in England. She graduated from Yale University in 2002, and holds an honorary doctor of letters degree from Middlebury College.

== Career ==
=== Early career ===
Ward began her career as an overnight desk assistant at Fox News in 2003. From 2004 to 2005, she was an assignment editor for Fox News in New York City. She worked on the international desk coordinating coverage for stories such as the capture of Saddam Hussein, the Indian Ocean tsunami in 2004 and the deaths of Yasir Arafat and Pope John Paul II. In 2006, she worked as a field producer for Fox News. She produced coverage of the Israeli-Lebanese war, the kidnapping of Gilad Shalit and subsequent Israeli military action in the Gaza Strip, the trial of Saddam Hussein and the 2005 Iraqi constitutional referendum.

Prior to October 2007, Ward was based in Beirut and worked as a correspondent for Fox News. She covered the execution of Saddam Hussein, the Iraq War troop surge of 2007, the Beirut Arab University riots and the 2007 Bikfaya bombings. She conducted interviews with notable figures such as Gen. David Petraeus, Iraqi Deputy Prime Minister Barham Salih and Lebanese President Emile Lahoud. She also spent time embedded with the U.S. military in Iraq, most notably in Baqubah.

=== ABC News ===
From October 2007 to October 2010, Ward was an ABC News correspondent based in Moscow. She reported from Russia for all ABC News broadcasts and platforms, including World News with Charles Gibson, Nightline and Good Morning America, as well as ABC News Radio, and ABC News Now. She covered the Russian intervention into Georgian territory and the 2011 Tōhoku earthquake and tsunami in Japan. She has also covered the war in Afghanistan.

=== CBS News ===
Ward's CBS career started as the network's foreign news correspondent in October 2011. She was a contributor for 60 Minutes and served as a fill-in anchor on CBS This Morning beginning in January 2014.

=== Work at CNN ===
On September 21, 2015, CNN announced that Ward was joining the network and reporting for all of CNN's platforms, and would remain based in London. With more than a decade as a war correspondent, on August 8, 2016, she spoke at a United Nations Security Council meeting on the situation in the civil war-torn Aleppo.

In July 2018, CNN named her its chief international correspondent, succeeding Christiane Amanpour. In 2019, she became one of the first Western journalists to report on the life in areas controlled by the Taliban in Afghanistan. In August 2020, Der Spiegel published reports that she and her team were under surveillance by Russian mercenaries while in the Central African Republic in May 2019.

In December 2020, in a joint investigation by The Insider and Bellingcat in co-operation with CNN and Der Spiegel, she reported how Russian Federal Security Service (FSB) members stalked Alexei Navalny for years, including just before his poisoning in August 2020.

In February 2022, CNN deployed Ward, initially, to the city of Kharkiv, in order to cover the beginning of the Russian Invasion in Ukraine. After the first days of war, she was relocated to Kyiv, where she engaged in a series of wartime reports on the advance of Russian troops and the flight of Ukrainian refugees away from Russian artillery strikes. She was among the journalists who travelled to Ukraine to give insights into the humanitarian situation for children and wounded civilians in Ukrainian hospitals amidst the ongoing conflict.

In December 2023, Ward covered the Gaza war. In a six-minute video report, she depicted the grim conditions in Gaza, emphasizing the impact on civilians and describing them as the worst she had seen in the strip in her 20 years as a reporter. Visiting a UAE-operated field hospital, Ward witnessed overwhelmed medical staff and interviewed an injured girl. While her report received praise, some criticized the attention, urging equal recognition for Palestinian journalists and aid workers.

=== Fall of Assad coverage and controversy ===
In December 2024, amidst the fall of the Assad regime, Ward was accused of faking an interview with an alleged prisoner of said regime. The man was shown being discovered by her crew in a prison, hidden under a blanket, later being told he was free to go and shown walking out gripping Ward's arm. However, he looked well and his cell was clean. CNN has denied staging the report and has defended Ward. After this report, Syrian fact-checking group Verify-Sy found that the man gave a fake identity. CNN would later confirm the man featured was an intelligence officer, and not an ordinary citizen who had been imprisoned. First identifying himself as Adel Ghurbal, he was later found to be Salama Mohammad Salama, a lieutenant in the Assad regime's Air Force Intelligence Directorate accused of committing war crimes such as torture.

=== Awards ===
Ward received a Peabody Award on May 21, 2012, in New York City for her journalistic coverage inside Syria during the Syrian uprising. In October 2014, Washington State University announced that she would receive the 2015 Murrow Award for International Reporting in April 2015. She has also received seven Emmy Awards, an Alfred I. duPont-Columbia Silver Baton, and honors from the Radio and Television Correspondents' Association.

== Personal life ==
In November 2016, at London's Chelsea Old Town Hall, Ward married Philipp von Bernstorff, a German fund manager, whom she had met at a 2007 dinner party in Moscow. They have three children, all boys, born in 2018, 2020, and 2023.

Her oldest son suffers from a rare genetic anomaly. Ward co-founded the Foundation for ARID1B Research after he was diagnosed.

Ward speaks fluent English, French, and Italian and conversational Russian, Arabic, and Spanish and knows basic Mandarin Chinese.

== Bibliography ==
- Ward, Clarissa (2020). On All Fronts: The Education of a Journalist. New York: Penguin. ISBN 9780525561477. OCLC 1277023055.
