= The Grange, Chalfont St Peter =

Building in Buckinghamshire, England

The Grange, formerly known as the Convent of the Holy Cross, was a country house and Roman Catholic convent at the village of Chalfont St Peter in Buckinghamshire, England, United Kingdom.

== History ==
The Grange developed from an estate first recorded in the possession of Missenden Abbey in 1224 and was valued at £12 in 1291. The estate was also known as the rectory or parsonage, and farmers were employed to act as bailiff and farm the estate, such as John Kynwoldmerssh in the early fifteenth century. The Grange was leased to William White and his wife Helen in 1484 for twenty-one years at a rent of £10 5s, however, in 1498, Edmund Brudenell, Lord of Brudenell Manor, purchased the remainder of the lease from Helen after her husband's death. Brudenell was taken to court by the abbey in 1501 and 1502 and charged with leaving several buildings in the estate in poor condition and taking equipment to his own property. In 1502, Brudenell owed the abbey £40 in arrears for the rent of the Grange, and was taken to court where his brother Robert arranged to pay the abbey £6 a year until £35 had been paid, but only £26 was paid. The estate was later leased to John Compton who is also known to have left the Grange in poor condition. Sir Robert Drury, Lord of Brudenell Manor, leased the Grange from the abbey, and purchased the estate, as well as the manors of Chalfont and of Hedgerley, for £594 in 1540 after the dissolution of Missenden Abbey.

Sir Robert's son Robert inherited the Grange and his father's other properties in Buckinghamshire on his death in 1577, which was in turn bequeathed to his son Sir Henry on Robert's death in 1592. The house was inherited by Sir Henry's son William on his death in 1617 who sold the Grange to Henry Bulstrode in 1626, at which time the house was leased to Robert Duck at a rent of £25. Bulstrode sold the Grange to Sir Isaac Penington in 1637, and was granted to his son Isaac on his marriage to Mary Springett in 1654, who both took up residence in 1658. The house became a notable centre of the Religious Society of Friends and its founder George Fox visited in 1658. Thomas Ellwood became a Quaker after a visit to the Grange in December 1659, and Quaker meetings held at the house in 1660 and 1661 were disrupted by soldiers who imprisoned Penington and others at Aylesbury. Ellwood became the tutor of Penington's children in 1662 and resided at the Grange with the family until the estate was confiscated in 1665 as punishment for Sir Isaac Penington's role in the execution of King Charles I.

In 1665, Arthur Trevor bought the Grange and was inherited by his nephew Sir John Trevor in 1667. The house was bought by George Jeffreys in 1680 and was his place of residence whilst the house at Bulstrode Park underwent reconstruction after a fire and held court at the Greyhound Inn in Chalfont St Peter. According to local tradition, Jeffreys gave strict orders to never remove his portrait from the Grange, but after his fall from grace his portrait was moved to the cellar and bricked in. John Bellers resided at the Grange from at least 1690 to 1695. John Wilkins leased the house from c. 1700, and the Grange was later bought by Henry Bentinck, 1st Duke of Portland. William Bentinck, 2nd Duke of Portland leased the house to Simon Mayne for ten years at £15 pa from September 1730, however, Mayne could not pay his rent in September 1736. In December of the same year, Captain Hilliard Hely arranged to pay Mayne's rent until at least 1738. The Grange was later leased to Hely in September 1743 for twenty-one years at £15 pa.

The house was the residence of Lieutenant General Terence O'Loughlin from 1802 until his death in 1843. The Grange was owned by Captain Richard Meredith from at least September 1848 to his death in 1850. The estate is recorded in the possession of Thomas Wright in 1854, and at his death on 25 April 1877. The trustees of Thomas Wright's estate sold the contents of the house at auction in September 1877. Reverend Canon Richard Norris Russell owned the Grange from at least 1883, and his wife Lady Mary Russell died at the house on 25 May 1891. The estate was bequeathed to his son Richard Harold Russell on his death on 13 June 1896. The house was advertised for sale in May 1899, and the contents of the house were auctioned in August. Adolph Fass, maternal grandfather of Robert Morley, purchased the estate in 1900, and lived there until his death on 30 April 1905.

The Grange was acquired by John Leeming by 1921, and operated as a hotel from 1923 until its sale in 1928. The house was bought by the Sisters of the Holy Cross, who converted the house into a convent and school, called the Holy Cross Convent School. The school closed on 1 September 2006, and in 2016, the Grange was demolished and the estate was redeveloped into housing.

== Notable alumni ==
- Christiane Amanpour (b. 1958), British-Iranian journalist
- Zoe Ball (b. 1970), British radio and television presenter

== Bibliography ==
- Edmonds, G. C.; Baker, Audrey (2003). A History of Chalfont St Peter and Gerrards Cross, and A History of Bulstrode. Colin Smythe Limited.
- Ellwood, Thomas (2004). The History of the Life of Thomas Ellwood, ed. Rosemary Moore. Rowman Altamira.
- Elvey, Elizabeth M. (1961). "The Abbot of Missenden's Estates in Chalfont St. Peter" (PDF). Records of Buckinghamshire. 17 (Pt. 1).
- Page, William (1925). "Parishes: Chalfont St. Peter". A History of the County of Buckingham, vol. 3. Victoria County History.
- Summers, William Henry (1895). Memories of Jordans and the Chalfonts, and the early Friends in the Chiltern Hundreds. Headley Brothers.
- Venn, John; Venn, J. A. (2011). Alumni Cantabrigienses: A Biographical List of All Known Students, Graduates and Holders of Office at the University of Cambridge, from the Earliest Times to 1900, Volume 2, Part 5. Cambridge University Press. ISBN 9781108036153.
- Wheelband, Audrey (1988). Chalfont St.Peter in Old Picture Postcards, vol. 1. Europese Bibliotheek.
