= Terence O'Loghlin =

Irish soldier

Lieutenant-General Terence O'Loghlin
- Born: 1764
- Died: 15 August 1843 (aged 78–79); Bentinck Street, London
- Burial place: Chalfont St Peter, Buckinghamshire
- Spouse: Charlotte Dupre (m. 1799–1843)
- Relatives: Murrough O'Brien, 1st Marquess of Thomond (uncle)
- Military career
- Allegiance: United Kingdom
- Branch: British Army
- Service years: 1782–1790; 1792–1827
- Rank: Lieutenant-General
- Commands: 1st Life Guards; Household Cavalry Brigade
- Conflicts: French Revolutionary Wars; Flanders Campaign; Battle of Beaumont; Battle of Tournay (WIA); Napoleonic Wars; Peninsular War; Battle of Toulouse

Lieutenant-General Terence O'Loghlin (1764 – 15 August 1843) was an Irish British Army officer. Born in County Clare in the Kingdom of Ireland, he joined the army in 1782 as an ensign in the 45th Foot. He served in the Flanders Campaign during the French Revolutionary Wars and was wounded twice. He transferred into the Life Guards and rose to the rank of colonel by 1808. He served in the Peninsular War from January 1813 to April 1814. He was breveted as a major general and commanded the First Cavalry Brigade of the Duke of Wellington's army.

He retired to half pay in 1821, but had one final promotion to lieutenant general in 1825 before fully retiring in 1827. He lived at The Grange, Chalfont St Peter in Buckinghamshire. He died in London in August 1843.

== Bibliography ==
- Brown, Steve. King George's Army - British Regiments and the Men Who Led Them 1793-1815: Volume 1: Administration and Cavalry. Helion and Company, 2023.
- McGuigan, Ron & Burnham, Robert. Wellington's Brigade Commanders: Peninsula & Waterloo. Casemate Publishers, 2017.
