= Edward R. Murrow Award (Washington State University) =

The Edward R. Murrow Lifetime Achievement Award is a journalism/communication honor extended by the Edward R. Murrow College of Communication of Washington State University.

The award is for "commitment to excellence that exemplifies the career of Edward R. Murrow." It may be for Lifetime Achievement or Distinguished Achievement, on a case-by-case basis.

== Honorees ==
As of 2011, the honorees were:

- 1997, Sam Donaldson, for Lifetime Achievement in Broadcasting
- 1998, Frank Blethen, for Lifetime Achievement in Journalism
- 1998, Walter Cronkite, for Lifetime Achievement in Broadcasting
- 1998, Moriyoshi Saito, for International and Intercultural Communication
- 1999, Al Neuharth, for Lifetime Achievement in Journalism
- 1999, Keith Jackson, for Lifetime Achievement in Broadcasting
- 2000, Ted Turner, for Lifetime Achievement in Communications
- 2001, Bernard Shaw, for Lifetime Achievement in Broadcasting
- 2002, Sir Howard Stringer, for International and Intercultural Communication
- 2002, Christiane Amanpour, for Distinguished Achievement in Broadcasting
- 2002, Daniel Schorr, for Lifetime Achievement in Broadcasting
- 2003, Daniel Pearl, for Distinguished Achievement in Journalism
- 2004, Peter Jennings, for Lifetime Achievement in Broadcasting
- 2006, Tom Brokaw, for Lifetime Achievement in Broadcasting
- 2007, David Fanning and FRONTLINE, for Distinguished Achievement in Journalism
- 2008, Don Hewitt, for Lifetime Achievement in Broadcast Journalism
- 2009, Bob Schieffer, for Lifetime Achievement in Broadcast Journalism
- 2009, Helen Thomas, for Lifetime Achievement in Journalism
- 2010, Deborah Amos, for Lifetime Achievement in Radio
- 2010, Judy Woodruff, for Lifetime Achievement in Television
- 2011, Ted Koppel, for Lifetime Achievement in Broadcast Journalism
- 2012, Dan Rather, for Lifetime Achievement in Journalism
- 2013, The John S. and James L. Knight Foundation, for Lifetime Achievement in support of Journalism
- 2015, Clarissa Ward, for Lifetime Achievement in Distinguished Journalism
- 2018, Robert Siegel, for Lifetime Achievement in Journalism
- 2019, Melissa Block, for Lifetime Achievement in Broadcast Journalism
- 2021, Lester Holt, for Lifetime Achievement in Journalism
- 2022, Ann Curry, for Lifetime Achievement in Journalism
- 2023, Dean Baquet, for Lifetime Achievement in Journalism
- 2024, Maria Hinojosa, for Lifetime Achievement in Journalism
- 2025, Harry Smith, for Lifetime Achievement in Journalism

== See also ==
- List of American television awards
- Edward R. Murrow
