= Frankie Hewitt =

Frankie Hewitt (née Teague; June 17, 1931 – Feb. 28, 2003) was an American theater producer and founder of the Ford's Theatre Society, responsible for restoring and reopening the historic site as a working theater.

== Early life and career ==
Born Frankie Teague in Roger Mills County, Oklahoma, she was women's editor of the Napa Daily Register from 1949–51 and later worked for the California Institute for Social Welfare (1954–55), the National Institute for Social Welfare (1956-58), the US Senate Subcommittee to Investigate Juvenile Delinquency (1959–61), and the US mission to the United Nations (1961–63) under Ambassador Adlai Stevenson.

She founded the Ford's Theatre society in 1967 and the theater reopened with a production of John Brown's Body by Stephen Vincent Benét on February 12, 1968. She produced over 150 stage shows and more than 15 network television specials broadcast from the theater. For her work with the theater she was awarded a 2002 National Humanities Medal.

== Personal life ==
Her second marriage was to 60 Minutes producer Don Hewitt until their divorce in 1974. She had two daughters: Lisa Gabrielle Hewitt Cassara, a coordinating producer of the syndicated television show "A Current Affair", and Jilian Childers Hewitt, from her first marriage to Bob Childers.

== Death ==
She died at her home in Kensington, Maryland from cancer, aged 71.

== Sources ==
- "Frankie Hewitt", Contemporary Theatre, Film and Television. Vol. 21. Gale, 1999. Gale Biography In Context, March 2, 2011.
- Olson, Elizabeth. "Frankie Hewitt, 71, catalyst for revival of Ford's Theater", New York Times, March 3, 2003: B7.
