= Muna Luqman =

Yemeni peace and women's rights activist

- Occupation: Activist
- Known for: recipient of the International Young Women's Peace and Human Rights Award

Muna Luqman is a Yemeni activist, peace builder, founder of the organization Food4Humanity and co-founder of the Women in Solidarity Network.

Luqman's career includes social work in the areas of health care, water projects and demining with the Adventist Development and Relief Agency. She has also worked with Save the Children and the Hayel Saeed Anam Group. In 2015 she founded Food4Humanity a Yemeni Foundation composed of Yemeni women volunteers, focusing on the cities of Hodeida, Sanaa, and Taiz.

She is a member of the Women's Alliance for Security Leadership (WASL). She co-founded the Women in Solidarity Network which encourages women to participate in peace and security efforts.

In 2019, Muna was the recipient of the International Young Women's Peace and Human Rights Award presented by Democracy Today. The same year she participated in a U.S. Congressional Briefing titled Women Bring Peace: The War in Yemen and Women's Leadership in Peacebuilding.
