= Don Hewitt =

American television news producer (1922–2009)

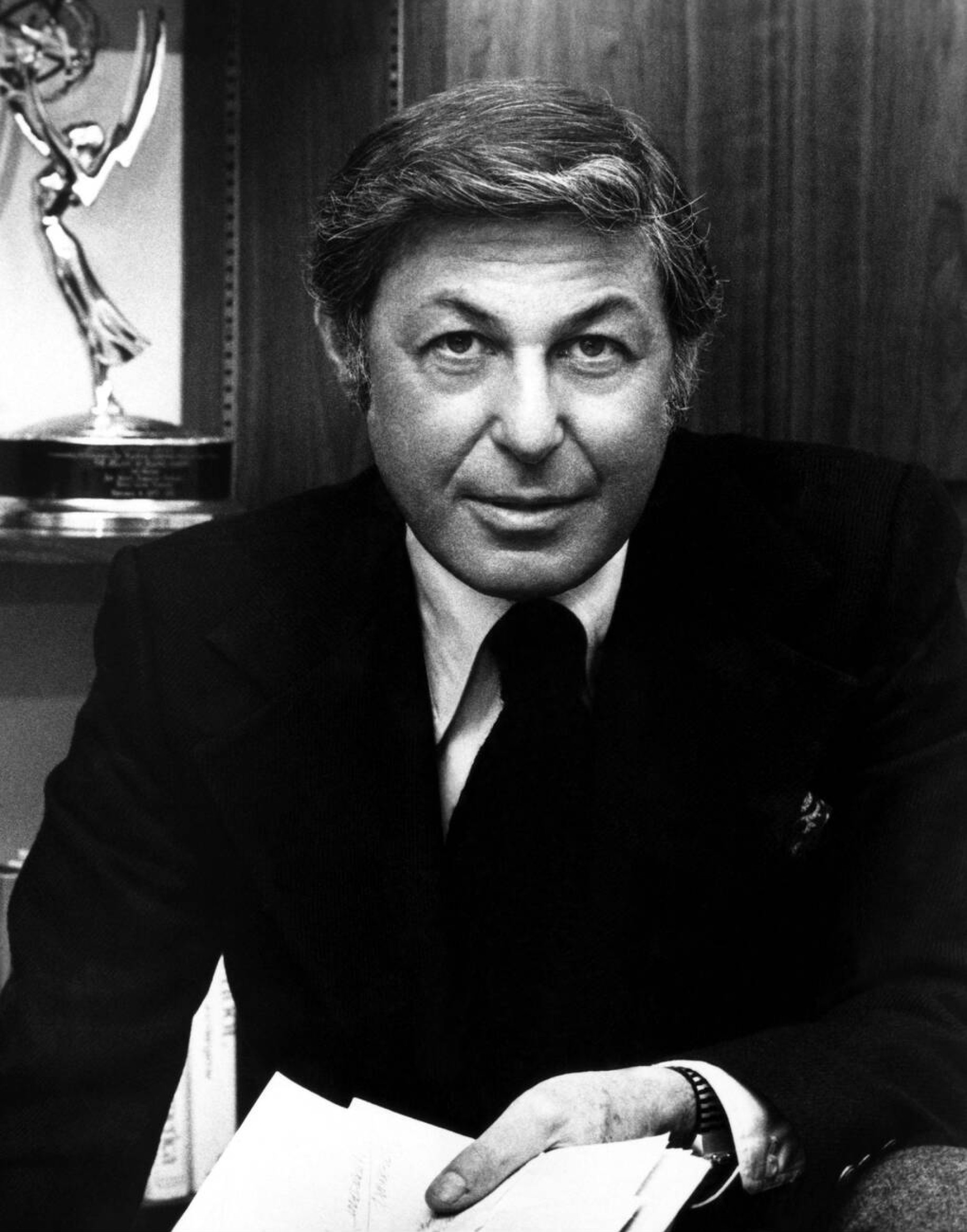
- Hewitt c. 1979
- Born: Donald Shepherd Hewitt; December 14, 1922; New York City, U.S.
- Died: August 19, 2009 (aged 86); Bridgehampton, New York, United States
- Education: New York University (withdrew for military service)
- Occupation: Television producer
- Years active: 1942–2009
- Employer: CBS News (1948–2009)
- Known for: Creator of 60 Minutes
- Spouse(s): Mary Weaver (m. 1945; div. 1963) (2 children) Frankie Teague Childers (m. 1963; div. 1974) (2 children) Marilyn Berger (m. 1979)
- Children: 4
- Awards: Edward R. Murrow Award, Emmy, Peabody Award, Producers Guild of America Award, Television Hall of Fame

Donald Shepard Hewitt (December 14, 1922 – August 19, 2009) was an American television news producer and executive, best known for creating the CBS television news magazine 60 Minutes in 1968, which, at the time of his death was the longest-running prime-time broadcast on American television. Under Hewitt's leadership, 60 Minutes was the only news program ever rated as the nation's top-ranked television program, which it accomplished five times. Hewitt produced the first televised presidential debate in 1960.

== Early life ==
Hewitt was born in New York City, the son of Frieda (née Pike) and Ely S. Hewitt (changed from Hurwitz or Horowitz). His father was a Jewish immigrant from Russia, and his mother's family was of German Jewish descent. Hewitt's family moved to Boston, Massachusetts, shortly after his birth, where his father worked as a classified advertising manager for the Boston Herald American. His family later lived in Milwaukee, Wisconsin. He graduated from New Rochelle High School, in New Rochelle, New York.

== College and early career ==
Hewitt attended New York University and started his journalism career in 1942 as head copyboy for the New York Herald Tribune. He joined the United States Merchant Marine Academy in 1943 and served as a journalist for Stars and Stripes in London. Hewitt later returned to sea as an ensign in the Naval Reserve. After World War II ended in 1945, Hewitt returned to his job as copyboy for the Tribune, then worked for The Associated Press at a bureau in Memphis, Tennessee. However, his wife Mary Weaver—whom he married while working in Memphis—wanted to go to New York City, so he moved back.

Back in New York City, Hewitt started working at the E.W. Scripps Company-owned photo agency ACME Newspictures, which was later merged into co-owned news service United Press.

== Career at CBS News ==
Hewitt soon received a lucrative offer at the CBS television network, which was seeking someone who had "picture experience" to help with production of television broadcast. He began working at its news division, CBS News, in 1948, and was producer-director of the network's evening news broadcast with Douglas Edwards for 14 years.

He was also the first director of See It Now, co-produced by host Edward R. Murrow and Fred W. Friendly which started in 1951; his influential use of "two film projectors cutting back and forth breaks up the monotony of a talking head, improves editing, and shapes future news broadcasts." In 1956, Hewitt was the only one to capture on film the final moments of the SS Andrea Doria as it sank and disappeared underwater. He directed the televised production of the 1960 U.S. presidential candidate debate between Senator John F. Kennedy and Vice-president Richard M. Nixon, on September 26, 1960, at the CBS studios in Chicago—the first presidential candidate debate ever televised. He later became executive producer of the CBS Evening News with Walter Cronkite, and produced the broadcast of John F. Kennedy's assassination as the story developed.

External videos
- "Life and Career of Don Hewitt", April 5, 1994, C-SPAN

In 1965, Friendly, who had become the president of CBS, slyly demoted Hewitt from his executive producer role, without firing him from CBS. During the ensuing period of "boredom", he conceived of the concept for 60 Minutes.

=== 60 Minutes ===
In 1968, he launched the eight-time Emmy Award-winning show 60 Minutes as creator and executive producer. Inspired by magazines and cinema, Hewitt was upfront about the mixture of serious and lighthearted news stories, stating that "I unashamedly admit I stole this programme lock, stock and barrel, from Life magazine." Within ten years, the show had reached the top 10 in viewership, a position it maintained for 21 of the following 22 seasons, until the 1999–2000 season.

Hewitt was a primary figure in the televising of a 1996 60 Minutes documentary on the tobacco industry scandal involving the tobacco company Brown & Williamson, in which the program eventually reported the allegations of whistleblower Jeffrey Wigand. Initially wary of a lawsuit, Hewitt sided with CBS News management and killed the Wigand story by censoring the interview. After blowback, a more complete presentation of the story was allowed to air, but the handling of the issue remained "a dark, sorry period in the otherwise virtuous life of 60 Minutes." The scandal was the inspiration for the 1999 film The Insider; Hewitt was portrayed in the film by Philip Baker Hall.

Declining ratings at 60 Minutes—after decades of being in the top 10, the show had dropped in rankings to number 20—contributed to what became a public debate in 2002 about whether it was time for CBS to replace Hewitt at 60 Minutes. According to The New York Times, Jeff Fager, producer of 60 Minutes II, was being floated as a possible replacement, speculation that proved to be accurate. The show was still generating an estimated profit of more than $20 million a year, but the decline in viewership and profit meant the show could no longer "operate as an island unto itself, often thumbing its nose at management while demanding huge salaries and perquisites." Within a couple of years, Hewitt stepped aside as executive producer at the age of 81, signing a 10-year contract with CBS to be an executive producer-at-large for CBS News.

In January 2010, 60 Minutes dedicated a full show to the story and memory of Hewitt.

In 2018, an internal CBS investigation found that in the 1990s Hewitt had been accused of repeatedly sexually assaulting a former CBS employee over a period of years. The original settlement amount of $450,000 was renegotiated several times; CBS had determined that the employee's allegations were credible and, by 2018, had paid her over $5 million in settlements in exchange for her silence.

== Personal life and death ==
Hewitt was married three times:

- Mary Weaver, with whom he had two sons: Jeffrey and Steven.
- Frankie Teague Hewitt, an American theater producer and founder of the Ford's Theatre Society. They had a daughter: Lisa Gabrielle Hewitt Cassara, former coordinating producer of "A Current Affair"; he also adopted her daughter, Jilian Childers, from a previous marriage.
- Marilyn Berger, American broadcast and newspaper journalist. Through Berger, Hewitt is the great-uncle of Rob Fishman.

In March 2009, Hewitt was diagnosed with pancreatic cancer from which he died on August 19, 2009, at his home in Bridgehampton, New York.

== Honors ==
- 1987: Hewitt received the Paul White Award, Radio Television Digital News Association
- 1988: In addition to several Peabody Awards given to 60 Minutes, Hewitt was given a personal Peabody Award, for his accomplishments that have "touch[ed] the lives of just about every American."
- 1989: Inducted into The Television Academy Hall Of Fame
- 1992: Hewitt won the Walter Cronkite Award for Excellence in Journalism.
- 1993: Hewitt and 60 Minutes were elected to the National Association of Broadcasters Hall of Fame.
- 2008: Hewitt was honored with Washington State University's Edward R. Murrow Award for Lifetime Achievement in Broadcast Journalism.

== Works ==
External videos
- Booknotes interview with Hewitt on Tell Me a Story, April 1, 2001, C-SPAN

In 1985, Random House published Minute by Minute, a look at the history of 60 Minutes. In 2001, PublicAffairs published Tell Me a Story: Fifty Years and 60 Minutes in Television, in which Hewitt chronicles his life as a newsman.
