= Robert Ivie =

Robert Lynn Ivie (born July 29, 1945, in Medford, Oregon) is an American academic known for his works on American public rhetoric concerning war and terrorism.

== Education and career ==
Ivie obtained a Ph.D. in rhetoric and communication in 1972 from Washington State University. He taught at Gonzaga University from 1972-1974, at Idaho State University from 1974-1975, at Washington State University from 1975-1986 (where he was briefly chair of the communication department in 1983) and at Texas A&M University from 1986-1993. In 1993, he came to Indiana University where he was a professor of Rhetoric and Public Culture in the Department of Communication and Culture at Indiana University until he retired in May 2013.

== Books ==
Ivie is the author or co-author of books including

- Congress Declares War: Rhetoric, Leadership, and Partisanship in the Early Republic (with Ronald L. Hatzenbuehler, Kent State University Press, 1983)
- Cold War Rhetoric: Strategy, Metaphor, and Ideology (with Martin J. Medhurst, Philip Wander, and Robert L. Scott, Greenwood, 1990; 2nd ed., Michigan State University Press, 1997)
- Democracy and America's War on Terror (University of Alabama Press, 2005)
- Dissent From War (Kumarian Press, 2007)
- Hunt the Devil: A Demonology of US War Culture (with Oscar Giner, University of Alabama Press, 2015)
